= Invasion of England =

The term invasion of England may refer to the following planned or actual invasions of what is now modern England, successful or otherwise.

== Pre-English settlement of parts of Britain ==
- The 55 and 54 BCE Caesar's invasions of Britain.
- The 43 CE Roman conquest of Britain.
- The 296 CE Roman invasion during Carausian Revolt.
- The fifth to sixth century Anglo-Saxon settlement of Britain.

== Post-English settlement of parts of Britain ==
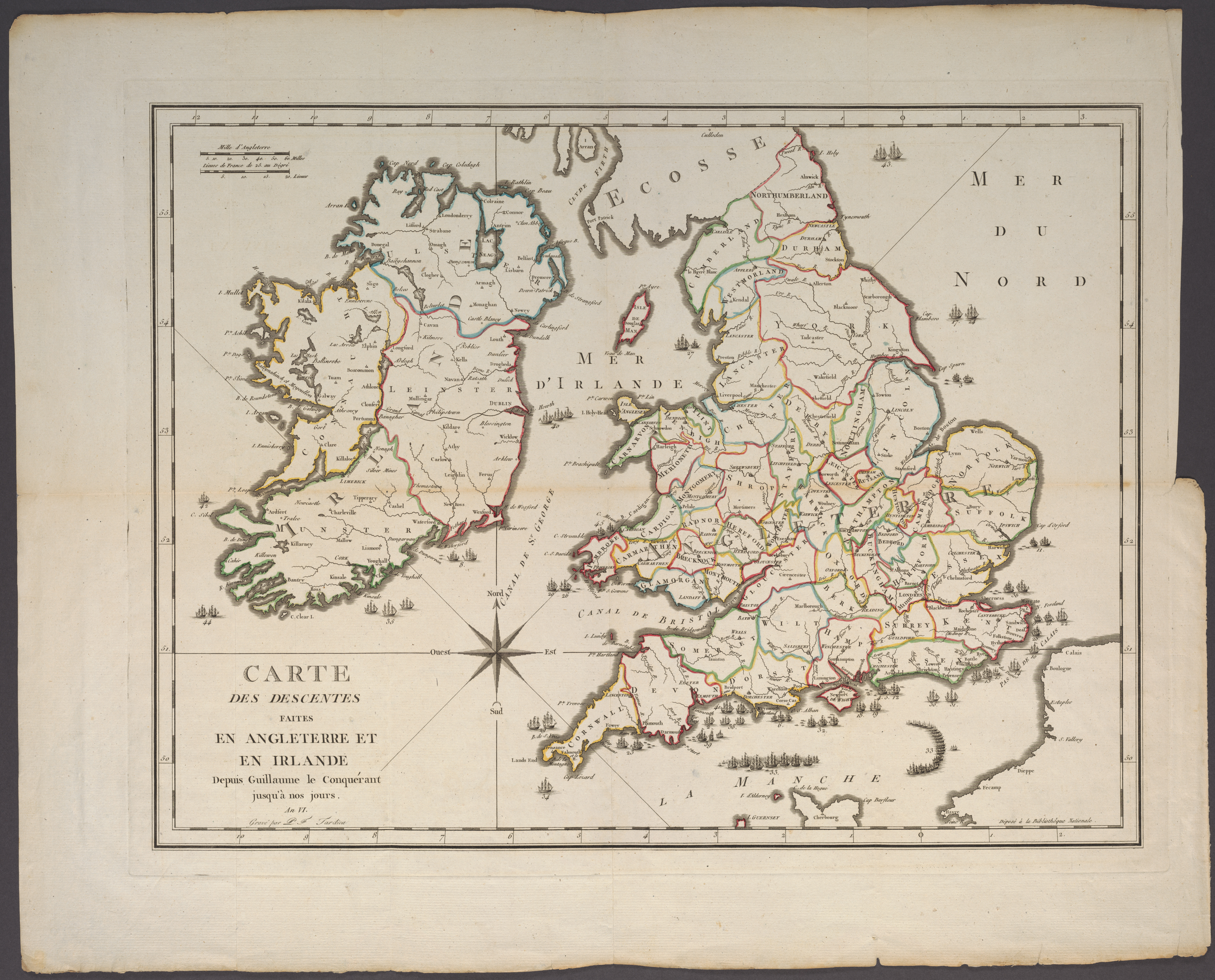
This map by Pierre-Francois Tardieu in 1798 shows attempted invasions of England and Ireland from 1066 to 1797.

- The eighth to eleventh century invasions of the British isles by the Vikings.
  - Invasion and partial conquest by the Great Heathen Army in 865.
- Danish invasion of England, ending successfully at the Battle of Assandun in 1016.
- Invasion of England by Norway under Harald Hardrada, September 1066.
- The 1066 Norman conquest of England under William the Conqueror.
- The 1136-1138 invasions of northern England by David I of Scotland and subsequent occupation until 1157.
- The 1139 invasion of England by Matilda during The Anarchy.
- The 1149 and 1153 invasions by the future Henry II during The Anarchy.
- The 1216 invasion of England by Louis VIII of France and Alexander II of Scotland, during the First Barons' War.
- Various invasions by the Scots from 1314-1513 during the Wars of Scottish Independence, the Hundred Years' War, and further Anglo-Scottish Wars.
- The 1326 invasion of England by Isabella of France and Roger Mortimer, leading to Isabella's regency until the ascendancy of her son, Edward III.
- The English Channel naval campaign, 1338–1339, who sought several French raids on English coastal towns like Portsmouth and Hastings.
- The Franco-Castilian raids on English coastal towns from 1374 up to 1380, led by Fernando Sánchez de Tovar and Jean de Vienne. Portsmouth, Folkestone, Winchelsea, Plymouth, Rye, Southampton and Gravesend, among other ports, were plundered and burned.
- The 1386 invasion by France was organised but never executed during the Hundred Years' War.
- The 1470 invasion in support of the Readeption of Henry VI.
- The 1471 invasion of Edward IV leading to the final deposing of Henry VI of England.
- The 1485 invasion via Wales by Henry Tudor leading to the Battle of Bosworth Field.
- The 1487 invasion from Ireland of the pretender Lambert Simnel, who claimed to be Edward Plantagenet, 17th Earl of Warwick, the rightful king.
- The 1495 landing with troops at Deal by Perkin Warbeck, who claimed to be Richard of Shrewsbury, the rightful king.
  - 1496 Warbeck invaded Northumberland.
  - 1497 Warbeck invaded Cornwall before his execution in 1499.
- The 1513 invasion of England by the Scots under James IV, which culminated in the Battle of Flodden.
- The 1545 French invasion of the Isle of Wight during the Italian Wars.
- The 1588 Spanish Armada was a failed invasion of England after it was heavily defeated by storms and the English fleet.
- The 1595 Spanish successful raid on Cornwall.
- The 1596 2nd Spanish Armada shattered by storms off Cape Finisterre.
- The 1597 3rd Spanish Armada dispersed by storms off the Lizard; landfall by small number of Spanish troops in Cornwall and Wales.
- 1627-1632 Barbary corsair occupation of Lundy.
- The 1640 Scottish Covenanter invasion of England as part of the Second Bishops' War, culminates at the Battle of Newburn.
- The 1644 Scottish Covenanter invasion (led by the Earl of Leven) of Northumberland as part of the First English Civil War.
- The 1648 invasion of England by a Scottish army in support of Charles I (King of Scots) against the English Parliament, launching the Second English Civil War; defeated at Preston.
- The 1667 Dutch Raid on the Medway and Felixstowe Landguard during the Second Anglo-Dutch War.
- The 1685 landing in England by the Duke of Monmouth and his supporters during the Monmouth Rebellion.
- The 1688 landing in England by William III of Orange, setting in motion the Glorious Revolution.
- The 1690 attack by the French on Teignmouth, Devon.

== Following the Acts of Union 1707 ==
- The (1708) planned French invasion to put James Edward Stuart (the Old Pretender) on the British throne as part of the War of the Spanish Succession.
- The Jacobite rising of 1715, from a Scottish base, in support of James Edward Stuart, defeated at Preston.
- The (1744) planned French invasion of Britain as part of the Austrian War of Succession.
- The 1745 French-backed Jacobite invasion of England (from Scotland, both then part of the Kingdom of Great Britain) led by Bonnie Prince Charlie.
- The (1759) planned French invasion halted when defeated by Royal Navy at the battles of Lagos and Quiberon Bay.
- The 1778 raid of Whitehaven by John Paul Jones during the American Revolutionary War.
- The (1779) never executed Franco-Spanish plans to invade Great Britain during the American Revolutionary War.
- Landing of a small French force, led by the Irish-American William Tate, at Fishguard in February 1797.
- The (1803–1809) planned but never executed Napoleonic invasion of Britain, constantly thwarted by the Royal Navy.
- The (1940) planned German Invasion of England, referred to as Operation Sea Lion.

== Fiction ==
There have been numerous portrayals of an invasion of Britain in fiction (especially by Nazi Germany) including:

Films

- Went the Day Well? (1942)
- It Happened Here, a 1966 film portraying a Nazi invasion
- Jackboots on Whitehall (2009)
- How I Live Now, a 2013 film depicting the invasion of England by unknown terrorists

Books

- SS-GB by Len Deighton, alternate history of Nazi Germany's successful invasion in 1940
- The Swoop! by P. G. Wodehouse, comic novel in which nine nations invade at once
- Asterix in Britain set in Roman-occupied Britain
- Rule Britannia by Daphne du Maurier - an invasion by the United States
- The Long White Winter by Sebastian Faulks
- The Battle of Dorking by George Tomkyns Chesney
- Fatherland by Robert Harris, alternate history of Nazi Germany's successful invasion in 1944
- Resistance by Owen Sheers
- The War of the Worlds by H. G. Wells
- The Great War in England in 1897 and The Invasion of 1910 by William Le Queux
- Ruled Britannia by Harry Turtledove, alternate history of Spanish Armada's successful invasion in 1588
- When William Came by Saki, alternate history featuring the conquest and occupation of the UK by the German Empire

== See also ==
- Border Reivers
- Scottish Marches
- Historical immigration to Great Britain
- Invasion of Ireland (disambiguation)
- Invasions of the British Isles
- Invasion literature
