= 1906 in the United Kingdom =

Events from the year 1906 in the United Kingdom.

== Incumbents ==
- Monarch – Edward VII
- Prime Minister – Henry Campbell-Bannerman (Liberal)

== Events ==
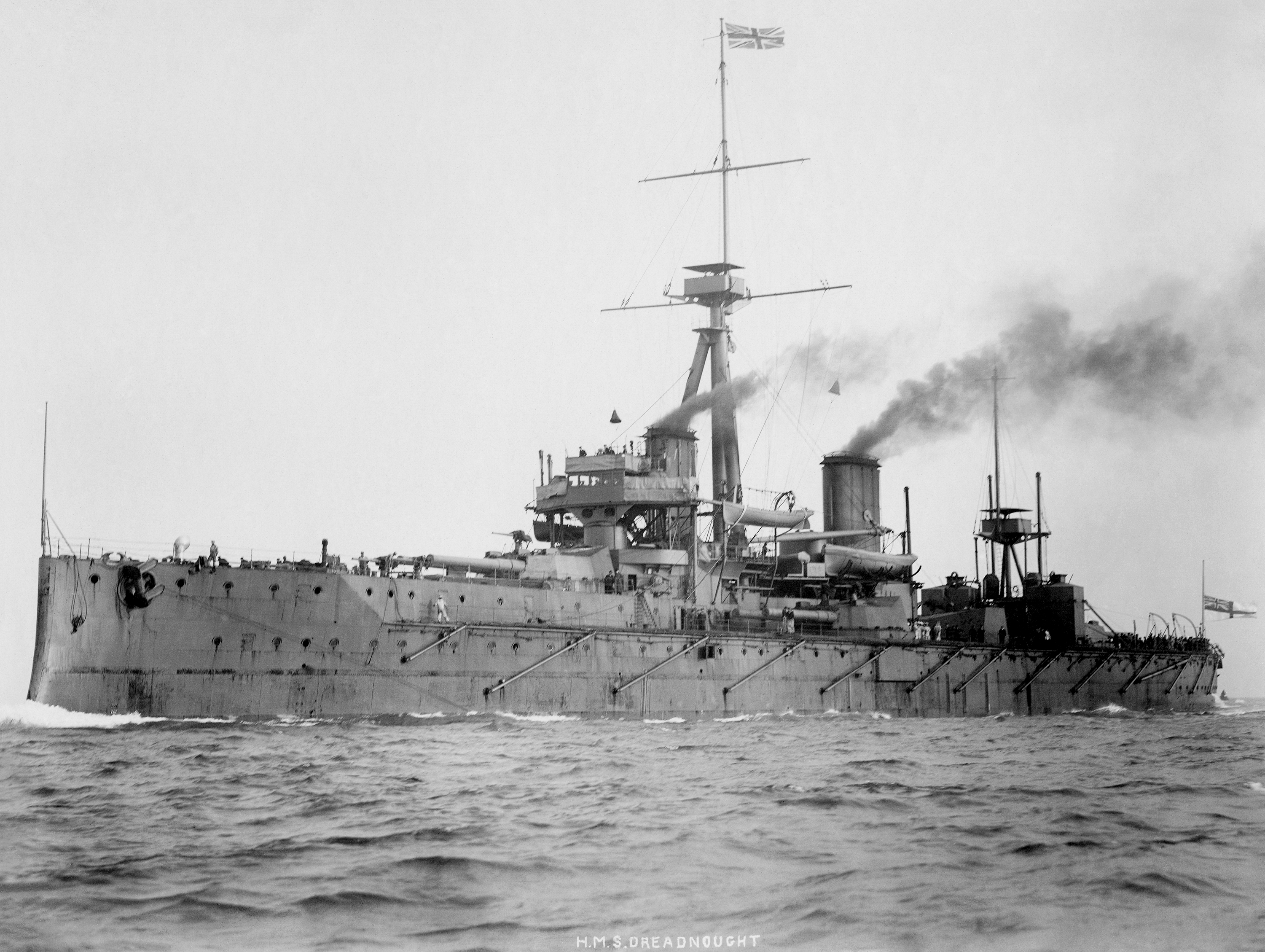
10 February: HMS Dreadnought

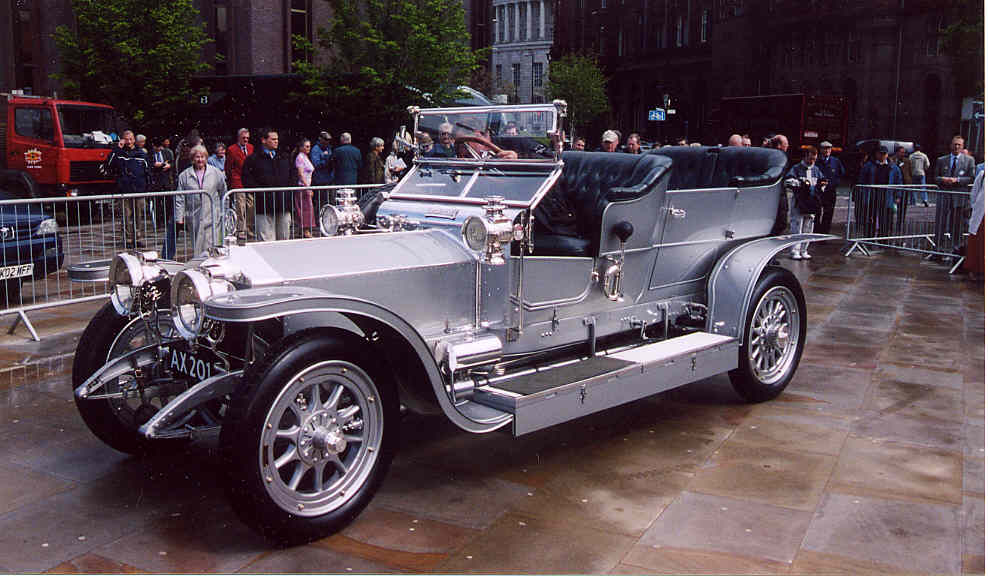
15 March: Rolls-Royce

- 8 February – the Liberal Party led by Henry Campbell-Bannerman win the general election with a large majority. The Conservatives lose 246 seats, including that of their leader, Arthur Balfour.
- 10 February – HMS Dreadnought, the first all-big-gun battleship, is launched at Portsmouth and sparks the naval race between Britain and Germany.
- 15 February – representatives of the Labour Representation Committee in Parliament take the name Parliamentary Labour Party.
- 10 March – Bakerloo line of the London Underground opened.
- 15 March – Rolls-Royce Limited is registered as a car manufacturer.
- 22 March – first international rugby match. England defeats France 25–8.
- 21 April – Manchester United F.C., known as Newton Heath until four years ago, secure promotion to the Football League First Division.
- 15 May – Our Dumb Friends League opens its first animal hospital, in Victoria, London.
- 26 May – opening of Vauxhall Bridge in London.
- 30 May – Royal Navy battleship HMS Montagu runs aground on the island of Lundy and becomes a loss.
- 22 June – the present King's daughter Maud is crowned as queen consort of Norway.
- 27 June – Swansea earthquake causes considerable damage.
- 1 July – Salisbury rail crash: a London and South Western Railway express train suffers derailment and collision passing through Salisbury station at excessive speed; 24 passengers and 4 railwaymen are killed.
- 12 July – Handcross Hill bus crash: 10 people are killed when a Vanguard Milnes-Daimler bus crashes on Handcross Hill whilst on a private hire excursion to Brighton.
- 31 August–3 September – Heat wave reaches its peak.
- 15 September – anti-vivisection Brown Dog statue is erected in Battersea, provoking riots.
- 19 September – Grantham rail accident: a Great Northern Railway sleeping car train suffers derailment passing through Grantham station at excessive speed; 14 are killed.
- 30 September – the first Gordon Bennett Cup in ballooning is held, starting in Paris; the winners, in the balloon United States, land in Fylingdales, Yorkshire.
- October – new City Hall, Cardiff, opens in Cathays Park.
- 8 October – German inventor and hairdresser Karl Nessler gives the first public demonstration of his permanent wave machine in London.
- 23 October – suffragettes disrupt the State Opening of Parliament.
- 2 December – HMS Dreadnought commissioned.
- 10 December – J. J. Thomson wins the Nobel Prize in Physics "in recognition of the great merits of his theoretical and experimental investigations on the conduction of electricity by gases."
- 13 December
  - Trade Disputes Act legalises picketing.
  - Workmen's Compensation Act entitles workers to compensation for industrial injuries or disease.
- 15 December – Piccadilly line of the London Underground opened.
- 21 December – Education (Provision of Meals) Act allows local education authorities to provide cheap or free school meals to the poorest children.

=== Undated ===
- Hampstead Garden Suburb established in north London.
- Richard Oldham argues that the Earth has a molten interior.
- Alice Perry becomes the first woman to graduate with a degree in civil engineering in the British Isles, at Queen's College, Galway, Ireland, and is appointed in December as an acting county surveyor.
- J. K. Farnell of London manufacture the first British teddy bear.

== Publications ==
- Angela Brazil's schoolgirl story The Fortunes of Philippa.
- William De Morgan's novel Joseph Vance.
- The English Hymnal edited by Percy Dearmer and Ralph Vaughan Williams.
- Henry Watson Fowler and Frank Fowler's usage guide The King's English.
- John Galsworthy's first Forsyte Saga novel The Man of Property.
- Rudyard Kipling's historical fantasy Puck of Pook's Hill.
- William Le Queux and H. W. Wilson's invasion literature novel The Invasion of 1910 (originally serialised in the Daily Mail from 19 March).
- E. Nesbit's novel The Railway Children (in book form).
- J. M. Dent and Company commence publication of the Everyman's Library series with Boswell's Life of Johnson.

== Births ==
- 5 January – Kathleen Kenyon, archaeologist of the Middle East and college principal (died 1978)
- 12 January – Eric Birley, historian and archaeologist (died 1995)
- 16 January – Diana Wynyard, actress (died 1964)
- 19 January – Leader Stirling, missionary surgeon (died 2003)
- 22 January – Joe Gladwin, actor (died 1987)
- 23 January – Lady May Abel Smith, royalty, great-granddaughter of Queen Victoria (died 1994)
- 10 February – Arthur Elton, pioneer documentary film maker (died 1973)
- 13 February – E. M. Wright, mathematician (died 2005)
- 19 February – Grace Williams, Welsh composer (died 1977)
- 26 February – Madeleine Carroll, actress (died 1997)
- 28 February – Percy Shakespeare, painter (died 1943)
- 3 March – Rose Hacker, activist (died 2008)
- 13 March – Dave Kaye, pianist (died 1996)
- 16 March – Henny Youngman, American-domiciled comedian (died 1998)
- 19 March – Stella Ross-Craig, floral illustrator (died 2006)
- 25 March – A. J. P. Taylor, historian (died 1990)
- 26 March – Ronald Urquhart, general (died 1968)
- 31 March – David Heneker, composer (died 2001)
- 8 April – Marjorie Lewty, writer (died 2002)
- 9 April – Hugh Gaitskell, Labour politician (died 1963)
- 11 April – Julia Clements, flower arranger (died 2010)
- 18 April – George Wallace, politician (died 2003)
- 21 April
  - Lillian Browse, art dealer (died 2005)
  - Stephen Tennant, eccentric socialite (died 1987)
- 13 May – Eileen Fowler, physical exercise instructor (died 2000)
- 29 May – T. H. White, Indian-born novelist (died 1964)
- 1 June – Walter Legge, classical record producer (died 1979)
- 5 June – Margaret Sampson, Anglican nun (died 1988)
- 19 June – Ernst Boris Chain, German-born biochemist, Nobel laureate (died 1979)
- 20 June
  - Catherine Cookson, novelist (died 1998)
  - Robert Trent Jones, American-domiciled golf course designer (died 2000)
- 26 June – John Wolfenden, Baron Wolfenden, educationist (died 1985)
- 27 June
  - Catherine Cookson, novelist (died 1998)
  - Vernon Watkins, Welsh poet (died 1967)
- 30 June – Ralph Allen, footballer (died 1981)
- 1 July
  - Ritchie Calder, Scottish socialist author, journalist and academic (died 1982)
  - Ivan Neill, major and Irish Unionist politician (died 2001)
- 3 July – George Sanders, screen actor (died 1972)
- 7 July – Hugh McMahon, Scottish footballer (died 1997)
- 10 July – Harold Ridley, ophthalmologist (died 2001)
- 14 July – Betty Kenward, magazine columnist (died 2001)
- 5 August – Joan Hickson, actress (died 1998)
- 7 August – Launcelot Fleming, Anglican bishop and polar explorer (died 1990)
- 28 August – John Betjeman, poet laureate (died 1984)
- 30 August – Elizabeth Longford, biographer (died 2002)
- 1 September – Eleanor Hibbert, historical romantic novelist under several pseudonyms (died 1993)
- 16 September – Norman Lumsden, opera singer (died 2001)
- 27 September – William Empson, poet and literary critic (died 1984)
- 30 September – J. I. M. Stewart, Scottish-born novelist and academic critic (died 1994)
- 20 October – Winifred Watson, novelist (died 2002)
- 21 October – Elsie Widdowson, dietician and nutritionist (died 2000)
- 24 October – Robert Sainsbury, businessman and art collector (died 2000)
- 1 November – Beryl Cooke, actress (died 2001)
- 4 November – Arnold Cooke, composer (died 2005)
- 5 November – "Pip" Roberts, general (died 1997)
- 6 November – Alastair Graham, zoologist (died 2000)
- 13 November
  - Hermione Baddeley, character actress (died 1986)
  - John Sparrow, literary scholar (died 1992)
- 18 November
  - Neville Ford, cricketer (died 2000)
  - Alec Issigonis, Ottoman-born car designer (died 1988)
- 19 November – Alan Bloom, horticulturalist (died 2005)
- 21 November – Georgina Battiscombe, biographer (died 2006)
- 29 November – Barbara C. Freeman, writer and poet (died 1999)
- 8 December – Richard Llewellyn, novelist (died 1983)
- 24 December – James Hadley Chase, novelist (died 1985)
- 30 December – Carol Reed, film director (died 1976)

== Deaths ==
- 5 January – Sir William Gatacre, general (born 1843)
- 22 January – George Holyoake, secularist and proponent of the cooperative movement (born 1817)
- 1 February – J. P. Seddon, architect and designer (born 1827)
- 2 March – Ellen Mary Clerke, writer (born 1840)
- 8 March – Henry Baker Tristram, ornithologist and clergyman (born 1822)
- 19 April – Spencer Gore, tennis player and cricketer (born 1850)
- 5 May – Eliza Brightwen, naturalist (born 1830)
- 6 June – Sir Frederick Peel, politician (born 1823)
- 20 June – John Clayton Adams, landscape painter (born 1840)
- 3 August – Sir Sydney Waterlow, businessman, politician and philanthropist (born 1822)
- 19 August – Agnes Catherine Maitland, academic, novelist and cookery writer (born 1850)
- 24 September – Charlotte Riddell, fiction writer and editor (born 1832)
- 9 October – Wilhelmina FitzClarence, Countess of Munster, fiction writer (born 1830)
- 30 October – Gathorne Gathorne-Hardy, 1st Earl of Cranbrook, politician (born 1814)
- 9 November – Dorothea Beale, proponent of women's education (born 1831)
- 30 November – Sir Edward Reed, naval architect, politician and Florida railroad magnate (born 1830)
- 19 December – Frederic William Maitland, historian and jurist (born 1850)
- 30 December
  - Angela Burdett-Coutts, 1st Baroness Burdett-Coutts, philanthropist (born 1814)
  - Josephine Butler, feminist and social reformer (born 1828)
  - Eugène Goossens, père, conductor (born 1845 in Belgium)

== See also ==
- List of British films before 1920
