= The Back Door (fiction) =

Anonymous work of invasion literature serialized in The China Mail in 1897

The Back Door was an anonymous work of invasion literature serialised in Hong Kong newspaper The China Mail from 30 September through 8 October 1897. The work, written in the form of a historical account, describes an imagined Russian and French landing at Hong Kong's Deep Water Bay, followed by shelling of Victoria Peak, a sea battle in the Sulphur Channel between Hong Kong Island and Green Island, and a last stand at Stonecutters Island in which British forces were decisively defeated. The story was intended as a criticism of the lack of British funding for the defence of Hong Kong; fears of invasion were driven by French expansionism in Southeast Asia and increasing Russian influence in Manchuria. It was speculated, but never proven, that members of the Imperial Japanese Army read the book in preparation for the 1941 Battle of Hong Kong, in which Japanese forces overran Hong Kong (via the New Territories, rather than Hong Kong Island) in just 18 days. In terms of its style, it follows the model laid out by George Tomkyns Chesney's The Battle of Dorking, but is noteworthy for its attention to detail, even giving real names of individual soldiers and ships; one reviewer described it as "unique" in its verisimilitude, stating that only William Le Queux's The Invasion of 1910 and Cleveland Moffett's The Conquest of America could compare to it.

The Back Door received renewed attention in October 2001, when it was republished by Hong Kong University Press under the title Hong Kong Invaded! A '97 Nightmare. The republished edition, at 328 pages in length, was accompanied by a variety of scholarly discussion; the actual text of The Back Door itself occupied barely one-sixth of the book's length. The title of the republished edition was intended as a form of misdirection and a joke to the reader, evoking fears over the 1997 handover of Hong Kong to the People's Republic of China. Bickley was criticised by one reviewer for the cartoon-like illustrations included with the book, and the fact that she had spent so much time on historical analysis of what was described as a "mediocre piece" of fiction.
