= Imperial German plans for the invasion of the United Kingdom =

Imperial German war plans

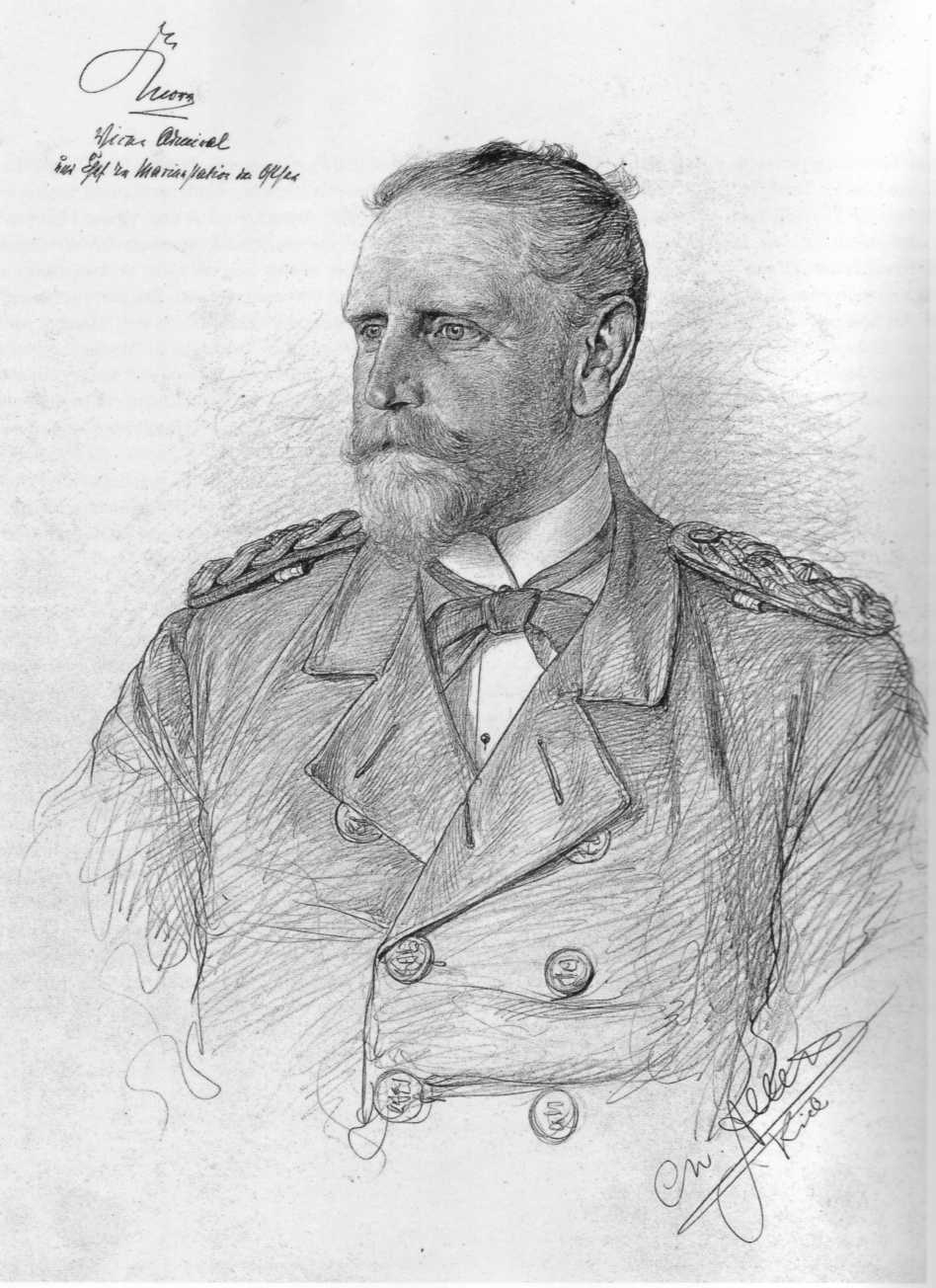
Admiral Eduard von Knorr, commander of the Imperial German Navy and lead strategist in formulating invasion plans

Imperial German plans for the invasion of the United Kingdom were first conceived in 1897 by Admiral Eduard von Knorr, commander of the Imperial German Navy, against a background of increasing Anglo-German rivalry and German naval expansion. Acknowledging the inferiority of the small German fleet, his concept called for a preemptive strike against the Royal Navy to establish temporary naval supremacy. This would be followed by an immediate landing, before British naval reinforcements re-established command of the sea. Subsequent studies determined that the shortest possible sea-crossing would be a prerequisite for success, requiring the use of port facilities seized in Belgium and the Netherlands to embark the expeditionary force. Reconnaissance of the English east coast was completed and potential landing sites in East Anglia were selected.

Comments were invited from Alfred von Schlieffen, Chief of the German General Staff, who regarded an invasion to be impractical. His staff estimated that it would require up to 320,000 troops to defeat the British home defences and capture London, and that a quick victory would be necessary if the expeditionary force was not to be cut off and forced to surrender. The plans were opposed throughout by Admiral Alfred von Tirpitz, State Secretary of the German Imperial Naval Office. They were shelved in 1899 when it became apparent that the German navy and merchant marine were not sufficiently strong to accomplish an invasion without compromising the secrecy considered essential for success. During the First World War, German naval operations against the British mainland were restricted to raids, designed to force the Royal Navy to dissipate its superior strength in coastal defence and thereby allow the smaller German navy to engage it on more favourable terms.

== Background ==
After becoming German Emperor in 1888, Wilhelm II abandoned Imperial Chancellor Otto von Bismarck's restraint in international affairs and adopted an aggressive foreign policy in an attempt to claim for Germany a leading position on the world stage. An example of this shift in policy was the Emperor's demand in January 1896 for German intervention in the Boer republic of Transvaal, following the Jameson Raid of December 1895–January 1896. The Foreign Secretary, Adolf Marschall von Bieberstein, persuaded Wilhelm not to become militarily involved and convinced him instead to send a telegram congratulating Transvaal President Paul Kruger on repelling the British raid. The "Kruger telegram" of 3 January 1896 precipitated a deterioration in Anglo-German relations which was accelerated by a German naval expansion designed to challenge British naval supremacy and to lead to the German Empire supplanting the United Kingdom as the dominant world power.

== Initial planning ==
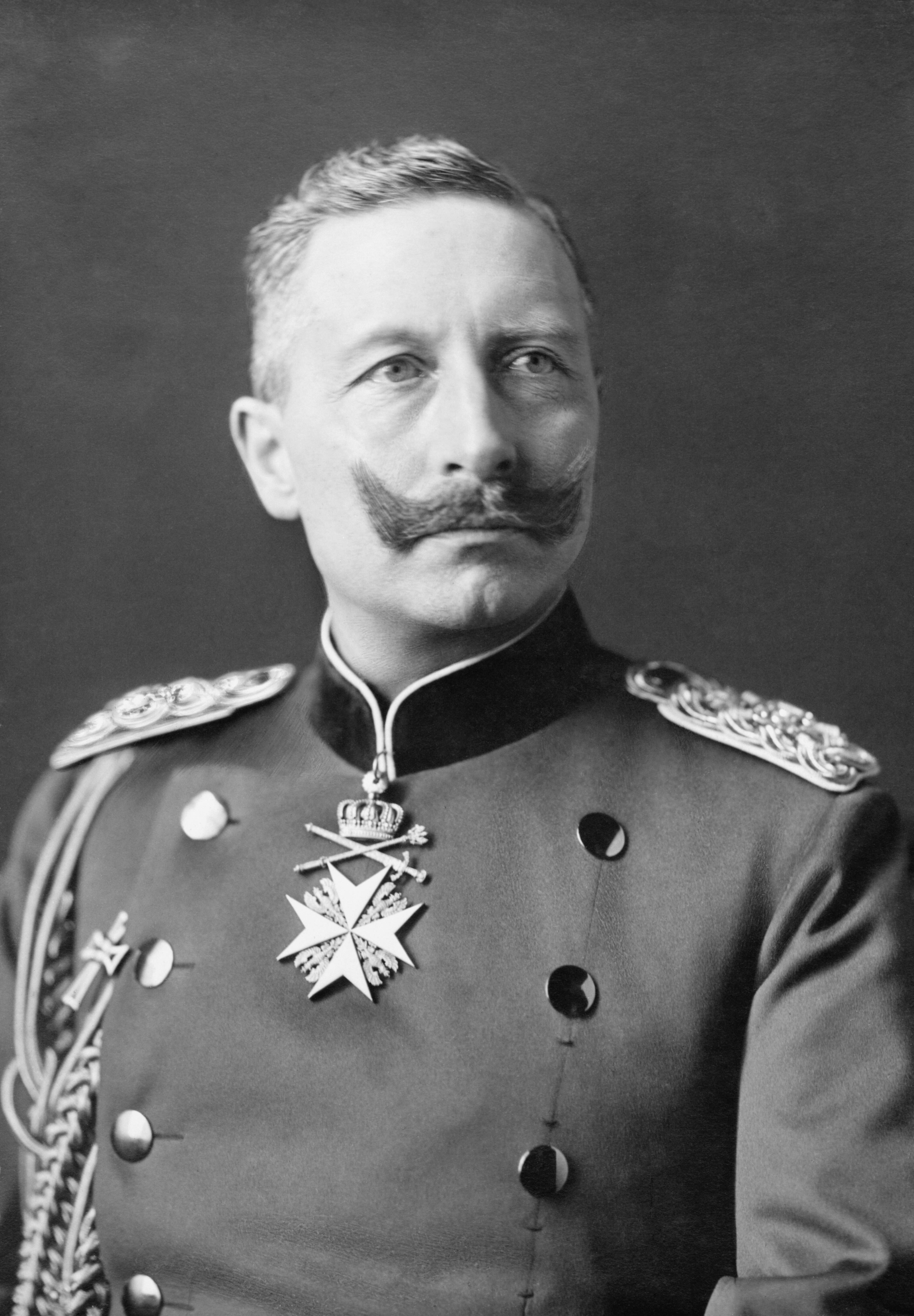
Kaiser Wilhelm II

As a result of the increasing rivalry between the two countries, German planners began considering the invasion of the United Kingdom in 1895. A concept was submitted to Wilhelm in May 1897 by Admiral Eduard von Knorr, commander of the Imperial German Navy. It considered that the small German navy would be able to launch a preemptive strike against the Royal Navy on the fifth day of mobilisation, before the British fleet became battle ready, followed immediately by a landing on British shores.

Wilhelm authorised further study, and the results of a project titled Memorandum: an Operation against Antwerp undertaken by the naval staff were presented to von Knorr in November. Reasoning that the shortest sea crossing offered the best chance of success, the project called for the violation of Belgian and Dutch sovereignty with a simultaneous land and sea operation to capture Antwerp and the forts on both banks of the River Scheldt. Troops were to be landed from seven steamers assembled under cover of darkness at the mouth of the river, while the VII and VIII Army Corps were to cross the Dutch and Belgian borders and strike west in three columns to capture Breda and link up with the seaborne force at Antwerp. This and other facilities in the Low Countries would be used as embarkation points for the invasion of the United Kingdom. The operation was to commence at least 24 hours before a formal declaration of war against the United Kingdom.

The six months it took for Alfred von Schlieffen, Chief of the German General Staff, to respond to the navy's request for comments indicates the army's lack of interest in the project. He did not consider an invasion to be feasible but saw some value in naval operations against Belgium and the Netherlands in his planning for a two-front war against the Franco-Russian Alliance; a German fleet operating from the Low Countries would deny the French navy the ability to operate in the North Sea. He suggested Vlissingen in south-west Holland as the best port of embarkation and recommended allocating all available troops, limited only by the amount of transport available, to the invasion force. He thought the Thames estuary or areas north of it would be the best place to land and believed that the landing should be completed by the fifteenth day. It was anticipated that the remainder of the British fleet would arrive and re-establish naval superiority. He stressed that an invasion must quickly force the British to sue for peace, or the Royal Navy would cut off the invading army from re-supply and reinforcement, thus compelling it to surrender.

By the end of 1897, a number of events revealed how over-ambitious German planning was. The small German fleet was weakened when ships were sent to the Far East. At the same time, the British Channel Squadron was doubled in size. It became the most powerful squadron in the world and its eight modern first-class ships outnumbered the five smaller first-class ships of the entire German fleet. To succeed, the plans for the invasion of Britain depended on secrecy, but the German seizure of Kiao-Chow in China in August had shown that it would be impossible to prepare an invasion force in secret. The Kiao-Chow expedition had also exposed Germany's lack of resources; the effort involved in equipping and sending one battalion had exhausted German transport facilities.

Invasion plans were strongly opposed by Admiral Alfred von Tirpitz, who had been appointed State Secretary of the German Imperial Naval Office in June 1897. He regarded von Knorr's plans as reckless and felt that an invasion could not be considered until the German navy was strong enough to rival that of the British. His thinking on offensive naval action, during planning in 1896 while Chief of the Naval Staff, was limited to a suicide mission immediately after the declaration of war. Designed only to attack merchant vessels and shell London, a slightly modified plan was produced two months later by one of his protegés on von Knorr's staff, who recommended mining the mouth of the Thames instead of shelling London.

Planning continued through 1898, based on the hope that the German fleet would one day be a match for the Royal Navy. Studies indicated that, without preparation before the outbreak of war, it would take eight days rather than five to begin landing troops on British shores. In April, the navy estimated that 145 ships and less than three army corps would be available, but the army estimated in May that up to eight corps, some 320,000 troops, would be necessary for an invasion to succeed. Even if such a large force could be spared in a war against France and Russia, it could not be assembled in secret and it would be years before the German harbour facilities and merchant marine would be capable of embarking and transporting it.

== Landing site ==
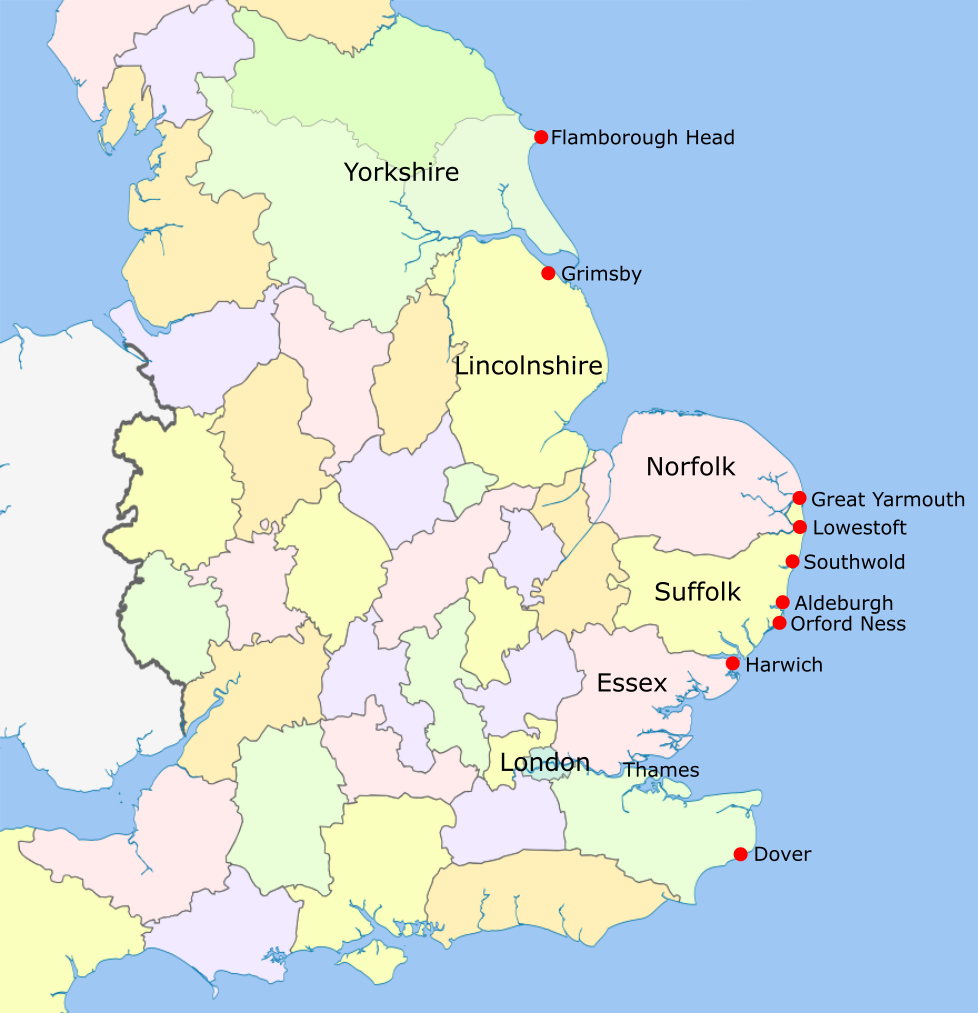
Areas identified as suitable landing sites, and other key locations.

Planners gave detailed consideration to the selection of a landing site. They rejected areas south of Dover due to the concentration of defensive fortifications, and based on the increasing strength of the Dover harbour facilities, they ruled out a landing along the Thames in March 1898. Studies focussed on areas north of the Thames, based on the presence of suitable harbour facilities and their proximity to forts. Harwich was particularly attractive for its capacity to accommodate larger ships, the lack of nearby forts and the ability to protect operations there with mines. Reconnaissance was carried out on the English coast from Orford Ness, Suffolk, to Scarborough, Yorkshire. Four locations were identified as suitable for a landing, based on ease of anchorage and beach approaches, from north to south:

- Flamborough Head, Yorkshire;
- The Humber estuary below Grimsby, Lincolnshire;
- The East Anglian coast from Great Yarmouth, Norfolk, to Southwold, Suffolk;
- The Suffolk coast from Southwold to Orford Ness.

Army planners favoured a location as close as possible to London. Schlieffen concurred with the naval planners' assessment that British coastal defences ruled out a landing south of Orford Ness. He rejected any plan to invade north of the Humber as too far from any worthwhile objective and recommended that planning should be based on a landing between Great Yarmouth and Aldeburgh, Suffolk. During the First World War, this was the area which British defence planners judged to be the most likely invasion route.

== Shelving the plans ==
In January 1899, von Knorr concluded that, without allies, the German Empire could not contemplate an invasion. It would, he felt, be impossible to assemble a large enough transport fleet in secrecy or achieve naval superiority, even for the seven days regarded as necessary to complete the landings. Army planners came to the same conclusion, though some interest in the project was revived as a result of the Second Boer War. The conflict in South Africa forced the British to denude their home defences, leaving only four battalions of the regular army at home by March 1900. Lieutenant-General Colmar Freiherr von der Goltz, commander of the Engineer Corps of the Prussian Army, saw in this an opportunity to gain temporary naval superiority and launch an invasion. His plan, submitted at the end of March, involved the use of a fleet of barges towed by tugs to transport an invasion force. German naval staff did not regard his idea as credible and did not pursue it further, although it was later echoed by Erskine Childers in his invasion novel, The Riddle of the Sands, published in the United Kingdom in 1903.

In 1901, several combined services amphibious exercises were carried out, the largest of which involved landing 1,700 marines. A British observer, already unimpressed by the size of the force, believed that the exercise had been staged by deliberately holding back the defending force. In the same year, a German staff officer produced a paper detailing how an expeditionary force of one cavalry and four infantry divisions might live off the land, destroy the British home army and capture London. The paper was suppressed by the authorities, reflecting the official military position, as maintained by Tirpitz throughout, that invasion was impossible. Further thought on the concept was limited to a formal evaluation by army and navy staffs, on the orders of Wilhelm, of William Le Queux's novel The Invasion of 1910 when it was serialised in the Daily Mail in 1906.

== Aftermath ==
At the beginning of the First World War, German intelligence over-rated the strength of British coastal defences, leading to the conclusion that even a large raid would involve too much risk for little reward. Naval operations against the British mainland were restricted to shelling coastal locations – Great Yarmouth on 3 November 1914, Scarborough, Hartlepool and Whitby on 16 December 1914 and Great Yarmouth and Lowestoft on 24 April 1916. The objective of these operations was purely naval, with the intention of enlisting British public opinion to pressure the Royal Navy into dispersing the Grand Fleet in defence of the coast, thereby creating an opportunity for the German High Seas Fleet to defeat it in detail.

== See also ==
- Tirpitz Plan
- Operation Sea Lion, Nazi Germany's plan to invade the United Kingdom during World War Two

== Bibliography ==
- Herwig, Holger (1980). "Luxury" Fleet: The Imperial German Navy 1888–1918. Amherst, New York: Humanity Books. ISBN 978-1-57392-286-9.
- Mitchinson, K. W. (2005). Defending Albion: Britain's Home Army 1908–1919. London: Palgrave Macmillan. ISBN 978-1-4039-3825-1.
- Moon, Howard Roy (July 1968). The Invasion of the United Kingdom: Public Controversy and Official Planning 1888–1918 (PDF) (Thesis). King's College London. OCLC 53593359.
- Röhl, John C. G. (2014). Kaiser Wilhelm II: A Concise Life. Translated by De Bellaigue, Sheila. Cambridge University Press. ISBN 978-1-107-07225-1.
- Sondhaus, Lawrence (1997). Preparing for Weltpolitik: German Sea Power Before the Tirpitz Era. Annapolis: Naval Institute Press. ISBN 978-1-55750-745-7.
- Steinberg, J. (July 1966). "The Copenhagen Complex". Journal of Contemporary History. 1 (3). Sage Publications: 23–46. doi:10.1177/002200946600100302. JSTOR 259934. S2CID 153914671.
- Steinberg, J. (2014) [1979]. "A German Plan for the Invasion of Holland and Belgium, 1897". In Kennedy, Paul M. (ed.). The War Plans of the Great Powers: 1880–1914. Abingdon, Oxon: Routledge. pp. 155–170. ISBN 978-0-415-74924-4.
