= The Riddle of the Sands =

1903 novel by Erskine Childers

- First edition
- Author: Erskine Childers
- Language: English
- Genre: Invasion novel; Adventure novel; Spy novel
- Publisher: Smith, Elder & Co
- Publication date: May 1903
- Media type: Print (hardback and paperback)
- OCLC: 3569143
- LC Class: PR6005.H52 R52

The Riddle of the Sands: A Record of Secret Service is a 1903 novel by Erskine Childers. The book, which enjoyed immense popularity in the years before World War I, is an early example of the espionage novel and was extremely influential in the genre of spy fiction. It has been made into feature-length films for both cinema and television.

The novel "owes a lot to the wonderful adventure novels of writers like Rider Haggard, that were a staple of Victorian Britain". It was a spy novel that "established a formula that included a mass of verifiable detail, which gave authenticity to the story – the same ploy that would be used so well by John Buchan, Ian Fleming, John le Carré and many others." All of the physical background is completely authentic – the various Frisian Islands and towns named in the book actually exist and the descriptions of them accurate (often, from the author's own experience). The same is true for the various "sands" of the title – vast areas that are covered at high tide but become mudflats at ebb. Navigating a small boat under these conditions requires a specialized kind of skilled seamanship, of which the character Davies is an unsurpassed master, and the descriptions of his feats are of abiding interest to yachting enthusiasts, quite apart from their role in the book's espionage plot.

== Plot summary ==
Carruthers, a minor official in the Foreign Office, is contacted by a former university acquaintance, Davies, inviting him to join in a yachting holiday in the Baltic Sea. Carruthers agrees, as his other plans for the social season have fallen through because of a heartbreak.

He arrives to find that Davies has a small sailing boat (named Dulcibella, a reference to Childers's sister of that name), not the comfortable crewed yacht that he expected. However Carruthers agrees to go on the trip and joins Davies in Flensburg, on the Baltic, whence they head for the Frisian Islands, off the North-Sea coast of Germany. Carruthers has to learn quickly how to sail the small boat.

Davies gradually reveals that he suspects that the Germans are undertaking something sinister in the German Frisian islands. This is based on his belief that he was nearly wrecked by a German yacht luring him into a shoal in rough weather during a previous trip. The yacht was owned and captained by a mysterious German entrepreneur called Dollmann, whom Davies suspects of being in fact an expatriate Englishman posing as a German. The situation was further complicated by Davies having fallen deeply in love with Dollmann's daughter, Clara, who, Davies is sure, is not involved in whatever nefarious scheme her father is engaged upon. In any case Davies is suspicious about what would motivate Dollmann to try to kill him and believes that it is some scheme involving the German Imperial government. Having failed to interest anyone in the British government in the incident, Davies feels it is his patriotic duty to investigate further on his own – hence the invitation to Carruthers.

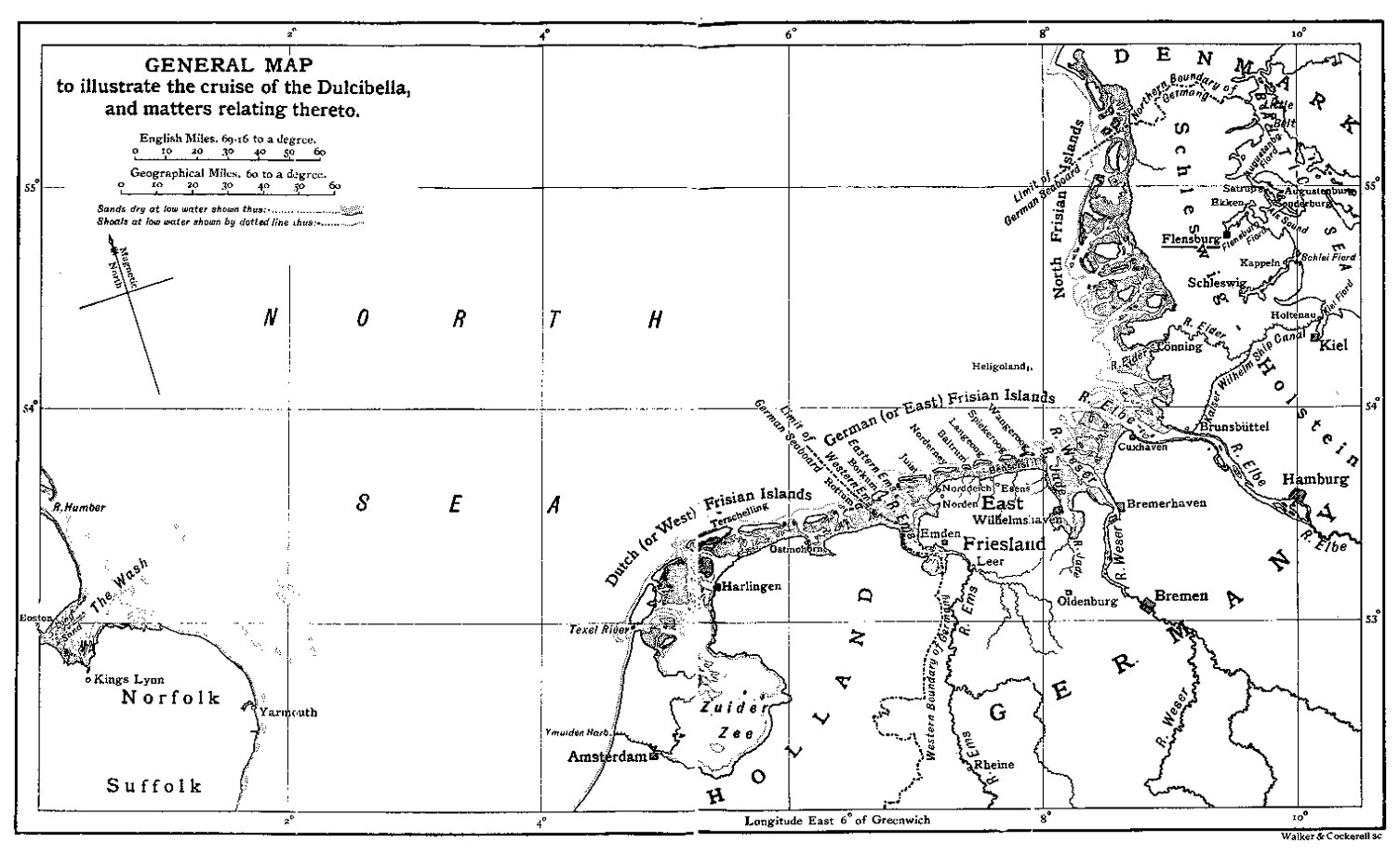
A map from the novel illustrating the voyage of the Dulcibella.

Carruthers and Davies spend some time exploring the shallow tidal waters of the Frisian Islands, moving closer to the mysterious site where there is a rumoured secret treasure recovery project in progress on the island of Memmert. The two men discover that Dollmann is involved in the recovery project. Carruthers and Davies try to approach Memmert. They are warned away by a German Navy patrol boat, the Blitz, and its commander, von Brüning, who is friendly and affable but still makes a veiled warning. This makes them all the more sure that there is something more than a treasure dig on the island. And meanwhile they discover that not only is Dollmann indeed an Englishman but he had been an officer in the Royal Navy – evidently having had to leave Britain in a hurry and take up a new life as a German.

Taking advantage of a thick fog, Davies navigates them covertly through the complicated sandbanks in a small boat to investigate the Memmert site. Carruthers investigates the island. He overhears von Brüning and Dollmann discussing something more than treasure hunting, including cryptic references to "Chatham", "Seven" and "the tide serving", and hears of a rendezvous at the Frisian railway station, several days ahead. The pair return through the fog to the Dulcibella, moored at the island of Norderney. There they find Dollmann and von Brüning have beaten them and are seemingly suspicious. However getting in the fog from Norderney to Memmert and back is a nearly impossible feat, which only Davies' superb seamanship could have achieved, and the Germans do not seriously suspect them of having done that.

Von Brüning invites them to Dollmann's villa for dinner, where he attempts to subtly cross-examine them to find out if they are British spies. Carruthers plays a dangerous game, admitting they are curious. But he convinces von Brüning that he believes the cover story about treasure and merely wants to see the imaginary "wreck". The party also serves to show that the Germans do not fully trust the renegade Englishman Dollmann and that there is some rift between them that might be widened.

Carruthers announces that the Foreign Office has recalled him to England. He heads off, accompanied part of the way to the Dutch border by one of the German conspirators – outwardly an affable fellow-traveller. But instead of embarking from Amsterdam to England, he doubles back, returning to Germany in time to be present at the conspirators' rendezvous (to which Dollmann, significantly, was not invited). He manages to follow von Brüning and his men without being noticed and trails them to a port where they board a tugboat towing a barge. Carruthers then sneaks aboard and hides, and the convoy heads to sea.

Carruthers finally puts the riddle together. The Germans are linking the canals and the railways, dredging passages through the shifting sands and hiding a fleet of tugs and barges. The only explanation is that they are preparing to transport a powerful German army secretly across the North Sea to invade Britain's east coast. He escapes after grounding the tugboat, rushes back to Davies and explains how they must flee before the Germans come after them. They persuade Dollmann and Clara to come with them to avoid Dollmann's being arrested by the Germans, who will think he has changed sides again. They promise Dollman immunity from being charged for treason in Britain – which, acting on their own and not having any authorization from the British government, they are not in a position to promise. As they sail across the North Sea, Dollmann commits suicide by jumping overboard, presumably to avoid disgrace and probable arrest.

An epilogue by the "editor" examines the details of a report prepared by Dollmann, outlining his plan for the invasion force. A postscript notes that the Royal Navy is finally taking countermeasures to intercept any German invasion fleet and urges haste.

== Literary criticism ==
Childers's biographer Andrew Boyle noted: "For the next ten years Childers's book remained the most powerful contribution of any English writer to the debate on Britain's alleged military unpreparedness." It was a notable influence on John Buchan, and on Ken Follett, who described it as "an open-air adventure thriller about two young men who stumble upon a German armada preparing to invade England." Follett has also called it "the first modern thriller".

Rhodri Jeffreys-Jones listed The Riddle of the Sands as one of the ten classic spy novels, in The Guardian's best spy novel list. Robert McCrum of The Observer included it in his list of the 100 greatest novels of all time.

The Daily Telegraph has cited the book as the second best spy novel of all time, after Kipling's Kim.

== Historical context ==
Though wars with Germany would become a central issue for Britain for much of the first half of the 20th century, few Britons anticipated that before 1900. Historically, it was France which was the traditional enemy of England and Britain, from the Hundred Years' War until the Napoleonic Wars. Just nine years before The Riddle of the Sands, William Le Queux published The Great War in England, raising the spectre of a French surprise invasion of England, reaching London – with Germany cast as Britain's loyal ally, rushing to help and in the nick of time saving England from the French. But Emperor Wilhelm II's policy of building up the German Navy and challenging British sea power effected a change in the actual power relations – reflected in the specific literary genre of invasion novels and the identity assigned to the possible invader of British soil.

As described in its author's own words, The Riddle of the Sands was written as "... a story with a purpose", written from "a patriot's natural sense of duty", which predicted war with Germany and called for British preparedness. The whole genre of "invasion novels" raised the public's awareness of the "potential threat" of Imperial Germany.

The Riddle of the Sands has been credited with the creation of the Royal Naval Volunteer Reserve, which trained civilians with no professional sea-going experience for service with the Royal Navy. In the book, Davies is an enthusiastic advocate of such a body:

There must be hundreds of chaps like me—I know a good many myself—who know our coasts like a book—shoals, creeks, tides, rocks; there's nothing in it, it's only practice. They ought to make some use of us as a naval reserve. They tried to once, but it fizzled out, and nobody really cares. And what's the result? Using every man of what reserves we've got, there's about enough to man the fleet on a war footing, and no more. They've tinkered with fishermen, and merchant sailors, and yachting hands, but everyone of them ought to be got hold of; and the colonies, too.

In fact the influence the book had on the formation of the Volunteer Reserve has been overstated. The 1903 Naval Forces Bill authorising the formation of the RNVR was introduced to Parliament in March 1903 (whereas the novel wasn’t published until May) and was passed in June. The formation of a naval reserve for civilians had been heavily discussed since the Boer War and its formation came after a concerted political and press campaign led by Thomas Brassey and Charles Chadwyck-Healey - in his book Childers was espousing the arguments made in favour of the Volunteer Reserve but the novel was by no means the source of the idea or the force behind its creation. However the impact of the book and its popularity has been credited with adding backing to the Naval Forces Bill and speeding its passage through Parliament. Childers would in fact be commissioned into the RNVR on the outbreak of the First World War.

Similarly the belief has grown that the book was responsible for the development of the naval base at Rosyth, but the chronology here is also incorrect; the purchase of the land for the Rosyth naval base was announced in Parliament on 5 March 1903, two months before the novel's publication, and some time after secret negotiations for the purchase had begun. Although Winston Churchill later credited the book as a major reason why the Admiralty had decided to establish the new naval bases, this seems unlikely. When war was declared he ordered the Director of Naval Intelligence to find Childers, whom he had met when the author was campaigning to represent a naval seat in Parliament, and employ him.

At the time Childers was writing Riddle he was also contributing to a factual book published by The Times in which he warned of outdated British army tactics in the event of "conflicts of the future". He developed this theme in two further works he published in 1911: War and the Arme Blanche and German Influence on British Cavalry.

The novel contains many realistic details based on Childers' own sailing trips along the East Frisia coast and large parts of his logbook entries from an 1897 Baltic cruise "appear almost unedited in the book". The yacht Dulcibella in the novel is based upon Vixen, the boat Childers used for his exploration. In August 1910, inspired by the work, two British amateur yachtsmen, Captain Bernard Trench RM and Lieutenant Vivian Brandon RN, undertook a sailing holiday along the same section of the Frisian coast, during which they collected information about German naval installations. The two men were sentenced to four years’ custody by a military court in Leipzig but they were pardoned by the Emperor in 1913. They joined "Room 40", the intelligence and decoding section of the British Admiralty, on the outbreak of war.

It is noteworthy that the demonization and vilification of Kaiser Wilhelm, which would become a staple of British propaganda in later years, are conspicuously absent from The Riddle of the Sands. On the contrary, on several occasions the character Davies expresses admiration for the German Emperor: "He is a fine fellow, that emperor. [...] By Jove! We want a man like that Kaiser, who doesn't wait to be kicked, but works like a nigger for his country, and sees ahead."

Carruthers several times states that he likes Commander von Brüning as a person, and this liking is not diminished by the discovery that von Brüning is deeply involved in the plan to invade England. In general the book's protagonists feel no malice towards the Germans. Rather, they take a sporting attitude, frankly admiring the Germans' audacity and resourcefulness while being determined to outwit them and foil their plans.

== Film, television, and theatrical adaptations ==
A seven-part radio adaptation by Valentine Dyall was broadcast on the BBC Light Programme starting in December 1949, with Dyall himself taking the role of Carruthers.

The Riddle of the Sands (1979) is a film adaptation of the book, starring Michael York as Charles Carruthers and Simon MacCorkindale as Arthur Davies.

An adaptaion of three 90-minute episodes by Colin Davis was broadcast by BBC World Service in January 1982. It was repeated on Radio 4 Extra in January 2026. It starred Jeremy Clyde as Carruthers and Michael Cochrane as Davies.

A 90-minute BBC Radio 4 adaptation was broadcast in January 1994, as part of the Saturday Night Theatre strand, starring Laurence Kennedy as Carruthers and Charles Simpson as Davies.

In Germany, the novel was popularised by the TV movie Das Rätsel der Sandbank (1984), produced by the public television and radio station Radio Bremen, and starring Burghart Klaußner as Davies and Peter Sattmann as Carruthers.

== Sequel ==
In 1998, nautical writer Sam Llewellyn wrote a continuation of the story named The Shadow in the Sands. This is subtitled "being an account of the cruise of the yacht Gloria in the Frisian Islands in April 1903 and the Conclusion of the Events described by Erskine Childers."

== See also ==
- Imperial German plans for the invasion of the United Kingdom
- Invasion literature
