= The Swoop! =

1909 novel by P. G. Wodehouse

- First edition
- Author: P. G. Wodehouse
- Language: English
- Genre: Satire
- Publisher: Alston Rivers Ltd
- Publication date: 16 April 1909
- Publication place: United Kingdom
- Media type: Print (hardcover)

The Swoop!, or How Clarence Saved England is a short comic novel by P. G. Wodehouse, first published in the United Kingdom by Alston Rivers Ltd. in London on 16 April 1909. Its subtitle is A Tale of the Great Invasion.

An adapted and much abbreviated version, set in the United States, appeared in the July and August 1915 issues of Vanity Fair under the title The Military Invasion of America and with the subtitle A Remarkable Tale of the German-Japanese Invasion of 1916.

The original story was not published in the United States until 1979, four years after Wodehouse's death, when it was included in the collection The Swoop! and Other Stories.

== Plot summary ==
The Swoop! tells of the simultaneous invasion of England by several armies – "England was not merely beneath the heel of the invader. It was beneath the heels of nine invaders. There was barely standing-room." – and features references to many well-known figures of the day, among them the politician Herbert Gladstone, novelist Edgar Wallace, actor-managers Seymour Hicks and George Edwardes, and boxer Bob Fitzsimmons.

The invaders are the Russians under Grand Duke Vodkakoff, the Germans under Prince Otto of Saxe-Pfennig – the reigning British monarch of the day was Edward VII of the House of Saxe-Coburg-Gotha – the Swiss Navy, the Monegasques, a band of Moroccan brigands under Raisuli, the Young Turks, the Mad Mullah from Somaliland, the Chinese under Prince Ping Pong Pang, and the Bollygollans in war canoes.

The initial reaction to the invasion is muted. "It was inevitable, in the height of the Silly Season, that such a topic as the simultaneous invasion of Great Britain by nine foreign powers should be seized upon by the press", but the English are far more interested in cricket and one newspaper placard announces "Surrey Doing Badly" (at cricket), ahead of "German Army Lands in England". And when the Germans begin shelling London – "Fortunately it was August, and there was nobody in town." – the destruction of nearly all the capital's statues, the reduction of the Albert Hall to a heap of picturesque ruins, and the burning of the Royal Academy, earn Prince Otto a hearty vote of thanks from the grateful populace.

The European parties form an alliance and expel the other invaders, but the Swiss soon leave, to be home in time for the winter hotel season, and when Prince Otto and Grand Duke Vodkakoff are offered music hall engagements and the leader of the army of Monaco is not, he takes offence and withdraws his troops.

The two remaining armies are overcome thanks to the stratagems of the indomitable Clarence Chugwater, leader of the Boy Scouts. By causing each commander to become jealous of the other's music hall fees, he succeeds in breaking up the alliance and, in the ensuing chaos, Clarence and his Boy Scouts are able to overcome the invaders.

In The Military Invasion of America, the United States is invaded by armies from Germany, under Prince Otto of Saxe-Pfennig, and Japan, led by General Owoki. Once again it is Clarence Chugwater who saves the day.

== Explanation of the title ==
The title alludes to The Swoop of the Vulture, a novel by James Blyth (Blyth 1909) that describes a surprise attack by forces of the "Imperial German Vulture". Complaining about the difficulties caused by so many simultaneous and surprise invasions, the leader of the German forces, Prince Otto, refers explicitly to Blyth's novel: "'It all comes of this dashed Swoop of the Vulture business', he grumbled."

== Major themes ==
The Swoop! is a comical satire on the then-popular genre of invasion literature. Six years before The Swoop, Wodehouse (under the pseudonym Henry William-Jones) contributed a humorous article to Punch magazine in which he outlined, in a mock-serious tone, the plot of an "Inspired-Prophecy kind of novel, in which England is overrun by invaders until the last few chapters". (William-Jones 1903) While it differs in many details from the earlier outline, The Swoop was that novel.

In writing The Swoop, Wodehouse was responding to an upsurge in the popularity of the invasion genre: 1909 marked "the year of greatest suppuration" (Eby 1988, p. 75) of the genre. William Le Queux's The Invasion of 1910 had been serialised in the Daily Mail and was a best-seller, while Guy du Maurier's play, An Englishman's Home, which had opened at Wyndham's Theatre on 27 January, was a theatrical sensation, playing in three London theatres simultaneously. (Eby 1988, p. 75)

Many writers of invasion-scare stories took as their starting point an assumed unpreparedness on the part of Britain's armed forces to counter the threat of invasion, and they wrote with the aim of raising public awareness of this deficiency. Du Maurier, for example, was a serving army officer (Clarke 1997, p. 17) while Le Queux was assisted by Field Marshal Earl Roberts, who had resigned from active duty a few years earlier to devote himself to the National Service League, which promoted universal military training. (Green 1981, p. 45) For these, and similar, writers, Britain's safety depended on building up its armed forces. Du Maurier's play was described in the Annual Register as "a forcible and cleverly-written argument in favour of universal military training". (quoted in Clarke 1997, p. 18)

Wodehouse "transforms the established pattern by reversing all expectations". (Clarke 1997, p. 19) Not only is Britain unprepared for invasion, the public shows a complete disregard for the invasion – except as a source of entertainment. And the invading armies are defeated not by the might of Britain's military, but by the cunning stratagems of an unknown "Man of Destiny", the 14-year-old Clarence Chugwater, assisted by his band of Boy Scouts. "Wodehouse concocted a preposterous plot which, unlike his models, was preposterous by intent." (Eby 1988, p. 76)

== References and sources ==
Sources

- Blyth, James (1909), The Swoop of the Vulture
- Clarke, Ignatius F, ed. (1997), The Great War with Germany, 1890–1914, Liverpool: Liverpool University Press, ISBN 0-85323-642-9
- Eby, Cecil D (1988), The Road to Armageddon: The Martial Spirit in English Popular Literature, 1870–1914, Durham, NC: Duke University Press, ISBN 0-8223-0775-8
- Green, Benny (1981), P G Wodehouse: A Literary Biography, London: Pavilion Books, ISBN 0-907516-04-1
- William-Jones, Henry (17 June 1903), "The Next Invasion", Punch, 124, London: 432
