= Before Armageddon =

1975 collection of stories edited by Michael Moorcock

- First edition cover
- Editor: Michael Moorcock
- Publisher: Wyndham Publications
- Publication date: January 1, 1976
- ISBN: 978-0-352-39784-3

Before Armageddon: An Anthology of Victorian and Edwardian Imaginative Fiction Published Before 1914 is a collection of stories, including invasion literature, and one article, all edited by Michael Moorcock. Originally published in hardback by W.H. Allen in 1975, it was re-issued as a paperback by Star in 1976.

The collection is notable largely for its introduction by Michael Moorcock.

== Contents ==
- "Introduction" - Michael Moorcock
- "The Battle of Dorking" - George Tomkyns Chesney (Blackwood's, May, 1871)
- "Dr. Trifulgas" - Jules Verne (The Strand, July 1892; Le Figaro Illustre, December 1884)
- "The Raid of Le Vengeur" - George Griffith (Pearson's Magazine (US) February 1901)
- "The Great War in England in 1897" - William Le Queux (Answers, 1893)
- "Life in Our New Century" - W. J. Wintle (The Harmsworth Magazine, January 1901)
- "The Three Drugs" - E. Nesbit (The Strand, Feb 1908)

== See also ==
- England Invaded, a second collection
