= Invasion literature =

Literary genre

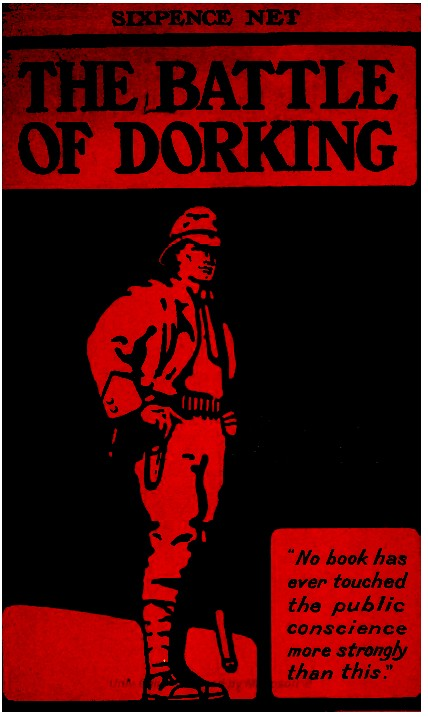
The Battle of Dorking (1871) established the genre of invasion literature. (Cover of the 1914 edition)

Invasion literature (also the invasion novel, invasion fiction or the future war genre) is a literary genre that was popular in the period between 1871 and the First World War (1914–1918). The invasion novel was first recognised as a literary genre in the UK, with the novella The Battle of Dorking: Reminiscences of a Volunteer (1871), an account of a German invasion of England, which, in the Western world, aroused the national imaginations and anxieties about hypothetical invasions by foreign powers. By 1914 the genre of invasion literature comprised over 400 novels and stories.

The genre was influential in Britain in shaping politics, national policies, and popular perceptions in the years leading up to the First World War, and remains a part of popular culture to this day. Several of the books were written by or ghostwritten for military officers and experts of the day who believed that the nation would be saved if the particular tactic that they favoured was or would be adopted.

== Pre-"Dorking" ==
Nearly a century before the invasion genre became widespread after the publication of The Battle of Dorking in 1871, a mini-boom of invasion stories appeared soon after the French developed the hot air balloon. Poems and plays centred on balloon armies invading the United Kingdom could be found in France and America. However, it was not until the North German Confederation used advanced technologies such as rifled breech loaders and rail transport to defeat the Second French Empire in the Franco-Prussian War in 1871 that the fear of invasion by a technologically superior enemy became more realistic.

== In Europe ==
One of those stories is a history of the French suddenly invading the United Kingdom in May 1852. According to I. F. Clarke, many feared that military weakness at home would invite attack from abroad and for the rest of the century not a decade passed without alarm. After the 1851 self-coup d'état of Napoleon, there were general fears that the French might attempt an invasion. To demonstrate the defenceless condition of the country, an anonymous author wrote A history of the sudden and terrible invasion of England by the French, in the month of May, 1852 ( London, 1851). This was the first complete imaginary war of the future to be written in English and it gave a detailed account of the weaknesses that led to the disaster.

The Battle of Dorking (1871) by George Chesney was first published in Blackwood's Magazine, a respected political journal of the Victorian era. The Battle of Dorking describes the invasion of Britain by an unnamed enemy who speaks German in which the narrator and a thousand citizens defend the town of Dorking without supplies, matériel, or news of the outside world. The story's narrative moves forward fifty years, and Britain remains devastated.

Like many of his countrymen, the author was alarmed by the successful 1870 invasion of the Second French Empire by the North German Confederation, which was led by the Kingdom of Prussia. They defeated Europe's largest army in only two months. The Battle of Dorking was initially meant to shock readers into becoming more aware of the possible dangers of a foreign threat, but unwittingly created a new literary genre appealing to widespread anxieties. The story was an immediate success, with one reviewer saying, "We do not know that we ever saw anything better in any magazine... it describes exactly what we all feel." It was so popular that the magazine was re-printed six times, a new pamphlet version was created, dozens of spoofs were created, and it was for sale throughout the British Empire. One running joke in England at the time was an injury, such as a bruise or scrape, being attributed to a wound received at the battle of Dorking.

Between the publication of The Battle of Dorking in 1871 and the start of the First World War in 1914 there were hundreds of authors writing invasion literature, often topping the best seller lists in Germany, France, England and the United States. During the period it is estimated over 400 invasion works were published. Probably the best known work was H. G. Wells's The War of the Worlds (1897), bearing plot similarities to The Battle of Dorking but with a science fiction theme. In 1907, Wells wrote The War in the Air, a cautionary tale depicting purely human invasions: a German invasion of the US triggers off a worldwide chain of attacks and counter-attacks, leading to the destruction of all major cities and centers, the collapse of world economy, disintegration of all the fighting nations and the sinking of the world into new Middle Ages.

Dracula (1897) also tapped into English fears of foreign forces arriving unopposed on its shores. Between 1870 and 1903, most of these works assumed that the enemy would be France, rather than Germany. This changed with the publication of Erskine Childers's 1903 novel The Riddle of the Sands. Often called the first modern spy novel, two men on a sailing holiday thwart a German invasion of Britain when they discover a secret fleet of invasion barges assembling on the German coast. Of these hundreds of authors, few are in print now. Saki is one of the exceptions, although his 1913 novel When William Came (subtitled "A Story of London Under the Hohenzollerns") is more jingoistic than literary. Another is John Buchan, whose novel The Thirty-Nine Steps, published in 1915 but written just before the outbreak of World War I, is a thriller dealing with German agents in Britain preparing for an invasion.

William Le Queux was the most prolific author of the genre; his first novel was The Great War in England in 1897 (1894) and he went on to publish from one to twelve books a year until he died in 1927. His work was regularly serialised in newspapers, particularly the Daily Mail, and attracted many readers. It is believed Ian Fleming's James Bond character was inspired by Le Queux's agent "Duckworth Drew". In some ways The Great War can be considered an antithesis to The Battle of Dorking – with the one ending for Britain in sombre and irrevocable defeat and decline, while in the other the invasion of London is pushed back in the last moment with the help of Germany, portrayed as a staunch ally against the French Third Republic and the Russian Empire. The United Kingdom obtained enormous territorial aggrandizement; it receives French Algeria and Imperial Russian Central Asia and "Britannia" becomes "Empress of the World".

Le Queux's most popular invasion novel was The Invasion of 1910 (1906), which was translated into twenty-seven languages and sold more than a million copies worldwide. Le Queux and his publisher changed the ending depending on the language, so Germany won in the German edition, while the Germans lost in the English edition. Le Queux was said to be Queen Alexandra of Denmark's favorite author.

P. G. Wodehouse parodied the genre in The Swoop!, in which England is simultaneously invaded by nine different armies, including Switzerland and the German Empire. English elites appear to be more interested in a cricket tournament, and the country is eventually saved by a boy scout named Clarence.

In France, Émile Driant writing as "Capitaine Danrit", wrote of future wars opposing France to Great Britain (La Guerre Fatale) or to Germany (La Guerre de Demain).

== In Asia ==
Invasion literature had its impact also in Japan, at the time undergoing a fast process of modernization. Shunrō Oshikawa, a pioneer of Japanese science fiction and adventure stories (genres unknown in Japan until a few years earlier), published around the start of the 20th century the best-seller Kaitō Bōken Kidan: Kaitei Gunkan ("Undersea Battleship"): the story of an armoured, ram-armed submarine involved in a future history of war between Japan and Russia. The novel reflected the imperialist ambitions of Japan at the time, and foreshadowed the Russo-Japanese War that followed a few years later, in 1904. The story would notably be the main source of inspiration for the 1963 science-fiction movie Atragon, by Ishiro Honda. When the actual war with Russia broke out, Oshikawa covered it as a journalist while also continuing to publish further volumes of fiction depicting Japanese imperial exploits set in the Pacific and Indian Ocean – which also proved an enormous success with the Japanese public. In a later career as a magazine editor, he also encouraged the writing of more fiction in the same vein by other Japanese authors.

Colonial Hong Kong's earliest work of invasion literature is believed to have been the 1897 The Back Door. Published in serial form in a local English-language newspaper, it described a fictional French and Russian naval landing at Hong Kong Island's Deep Water Bay; the story was intended to criticise the lack of British funding for the defence of Hong Kong, and it is speculated that members of the Imperial Japanese Army may have read the book in preparation for the 1941 Battle of Hong Kong.

== In the United States ==
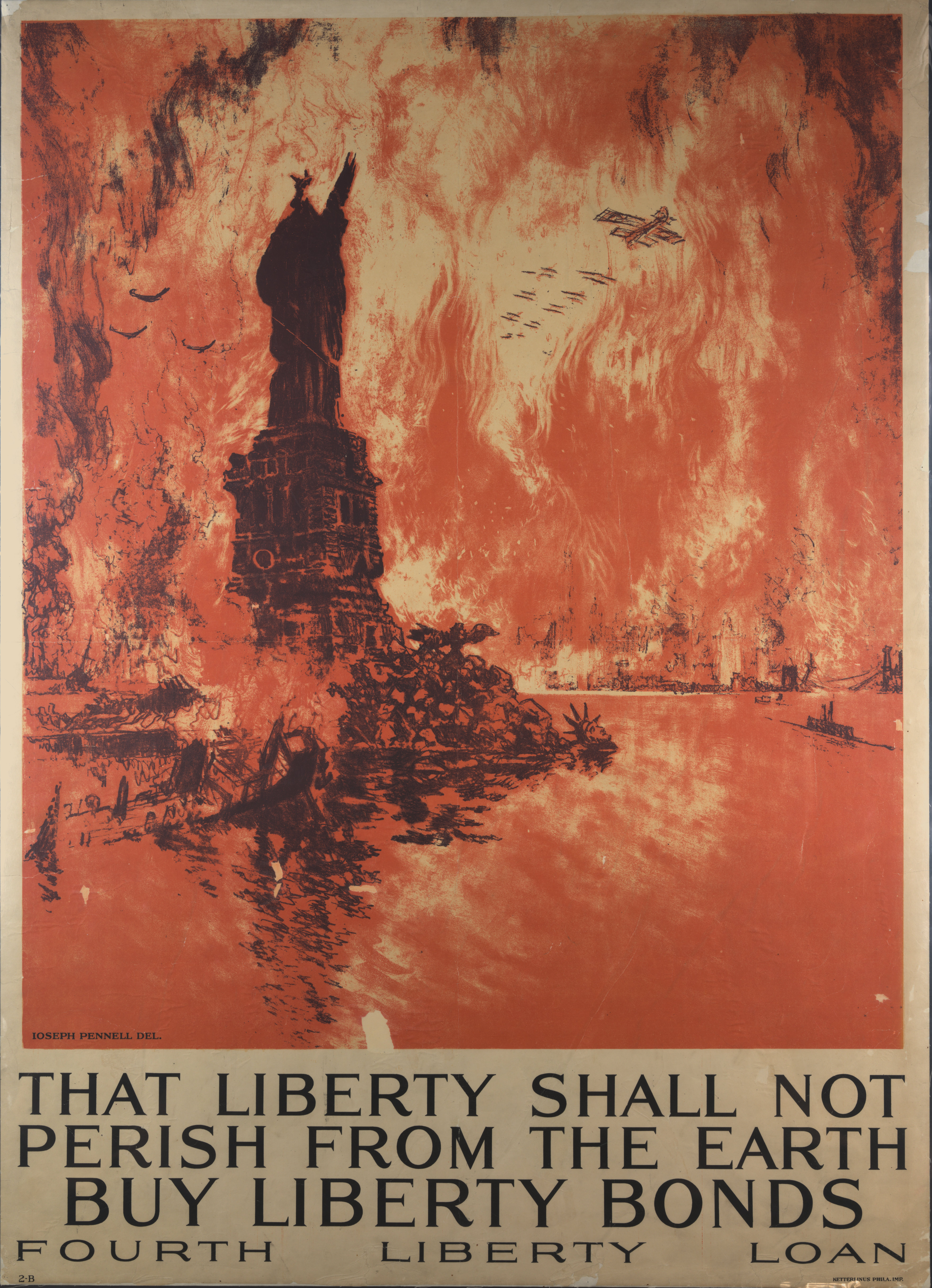
Joseph Pennell's 1918 Liberty bond poster calls up the pictorial image of an invaded, burning New York City.

One of the earliest invasion stories to appear in print in the US was "The Stricken Nation" by Henry Grattan Donnelly published in 1890 in New York. It tells of a successful invasion of the US by the UK. The move of U.S. public opinion towards participation in World War I was reflected in Uncle Sam's Boys at The Invasion of the United States by H. Irving Hancock. This four-book series, published by the Henry Altemus Company in 1916, depicts a German invasion of the US in 1920 and 1921. The plot seems to transfer the main story line of Le Queux's The Great War (with which the writer may have been familiar) to a US theatre: the Germans launch a surprise attack, capture Boston despite heroic resistance by "Uncle Sam's boys", overrun all of New England and New York and reach as far as Pittsburgh – but at last are gloriously crushed by fresh US forces.

== In Australia ==
Australia's contribution to invasion literature was set against the background of pre-Federation colonial fears of the "Yellow Peril" and the foundations of the White Australia policy. From the late 1880s through to the beginning of World War I, this fear was expressed in Australia through cartoons, poems, plays and novels. Three of the most well known of these novels were White or Yellow? A Story of the Race War of AD 1908 (1888) by journalist William Lane, The Yellow Wave (1895) by Kenneth Mackay and The Australian Crisis (1909) by Charles H. Kirmess (possibly a pseudonym for another Australian author Frank Fox). Each of these novels contained two major common themes which were a reflection of the fears and concerns within a contemporary Australian context; the Australian continent was at risk of major invasion from a strong Asian power (ie. China or Japan, sometimes with the assistance of the Russian Empire) and that the United Kingdom was apathetic towards the protection of its faraway colonies, and would not come to Australia's aid when needed. Australia's biggest contribution to invasion literature was the 1892 novel The Germ Growers by Robert Potter. Which helped start the alien invasion sub-genre.

== After World War I ==
The "First Red Scare" following World War I produced Edgar Rice Burroughs's The Moon Men (1925), a depiction of Earth (and specifically, the United States) under the rule of cruel invaders from the Moon. This book was written initially as Under the Red Flag as an explicit anti-Communist novel, and when rejected by the publishers, it was "recycled" by Burroughs in a science fiction format.

Ivan Petrushevich's The Flying Submarine (1922) depicts Soviet forces' invasion of the United Kingdom after most of Europe and Asia falls to communism. The story features the British fleet being destroyed by a swarm of insect-like single-pilot submarines that can emerge from the water to attack their foes.

Robert A. Heinlein's Sixth Column (1941) told the story of the technologically advanced PanAsians' invasion and conquest of the United States and the subsequent guerrilla struggle to overthrow them with even more advanced technology.

== The Cold War ==
In the 1950s, US fears of Communist invasion were notable in the novel The Puppet Masters (1951), by Robert A. Heinlein, the movie Invasion, USA (1952), directed by Alfred E. Green, and the US Defence Department propaganda film Red Nightmare (1957), directed by George Waggner. An explicit invasion-and-occupation scenario is presented in Point Ultimate (1955), by Jerry Sohl, about life in the Soviet-occupied US of 1999.

In the 1960s, the invasion literature enemy changed from the political threat of Communist infiltration and indoctrination from and conquest by the Soviets, to the 19th-century Yellow Peril of "Red China" (the People's Republic of China) who threaten the economy, the political stability, and the physical integrity of the US, and thus of the Western world. In Goldfinger (1964) Communist China provides the villain with a dirty atomic bomb to irradiate and render useless the gold bullion that is the basis of the US economy. In You Only Live Twice (1967), the PRC disrupts the geopolitical balance between the US and the Soviets, by the kidnapping of their respective spacecraft in outer space, to provoke a nuclear war, which would allow Chinese global supremacy. In Battle Beneath the Earth (1967), the PRC attempt to invade the US proper by way of a tunnel beneath the Pacific Ocean.

In 1971, when the US began acknowledging that the Vietnam War (1955–1975) was a loss, two books depicting the Soviet occupation of the continental US were published; the cautionary tale Vandenberg (1971), by Oliver Lange, wherein most of the US accepts the Soviet overlord without much protest, and the only armed resistance is by guerrillas in New Mexico; and The First Team (1971), by John Ball, which depicts a hopeless situation resolved by a band of patriots, which concludes with the country's liberation. The film Red Dawn (1984) depicts a Soviet/Cuban invasion of the United States and a band of high school students who resist them. The television miniseries Amerika (1987), directed by Donald Wrye, depicts life in the US a decade after the Soviet conquest.

The Tomorrow series (1993–1999) by John Marsden, details the perspective of adolescent guerrillas fighting against the invasion of Australia, by an unnamed country (implied to be Indonesia).

== Political impact ==
Stories of a planned German invasion rose to increasing political prominence from 1906. Taking their inspiration from the stories of Le Queux and Childers, hundreds of ordinary citizens began to suspect foreigners of espionage. This trend was accentuated by Le Queux, who collected 'sightings' brought to his attention by readers and raised them through his association with the Daily Mail. Subsequent research has since shown that no significant German espionage network existed in Britain at this time. Claims about the scale of German invasion preparations grew increasingly ambitious. The number of German spies was put at between 60,000 and 300,000 (in spite of the total German community in Britain being no more than 44,000 people). It was alleged that thousands of rifles were being stockpiled by German spies in order to arm saboteurs at the outbreak of war.

Calls for government action grew ever more intense, and in 1909 it was given as the reason for the secret foundation of the Secret Service Bureau, the forerunner of MI5 and MI6. Historians today debate whether this was in fact the real reason, but in any case the concerns raised in invasion literature came to define the early duties of the Bureau's Home Section. Vernon Kell, the section head, remained obsessed with the location of these saboteurs, focusing his operational plans both before and during the war on defeating the saboteurs imagined by Le Queux.

Invasion literature was not without detractors; policy experts in the years preceding the First World War said invasion literature risked inciting war between England and Germany and France. Critics such as Prime Minister Henry Campbell-Bannerman denounced Le Queux's The Invasion of 1910 as "calculated to inflame public opinion abroad and alarm the more ignorant public at home." Journalist Charles Lowe wrote in 1910: "Among all the causes contributing to the continuance of a state of bad blood between England and Germany perhaps the most potent is the baneful industry of those unscrupulous writers who are forever asserting that the Germans are only awaiting a fitting opportunity to attack us in our island home and burst us up."

== Notable invasion literature ==
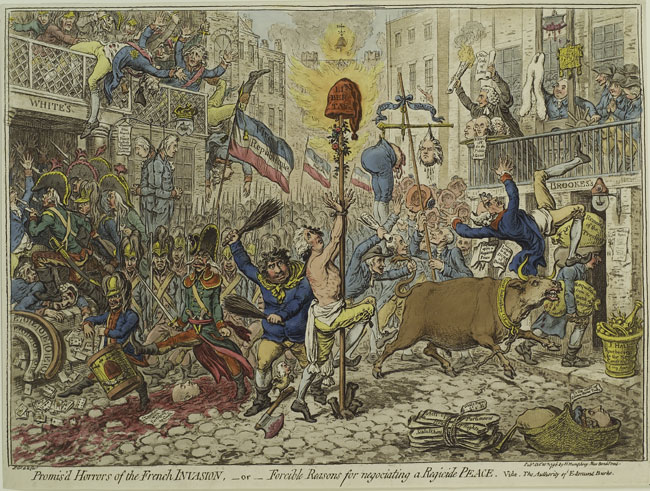
"Promised Horrors of the French Invasion" – a cartoon by the British James Gillray published during the French Revolution and depicting a London occupied by the French

=== Pre-World War I ===
- The Battle of Dorking (1871) by George Chesney
- The Invasion (1877) by W. H. Walker
- A Catástrofe (ca. 1878) by José Maria Eça de Queiroz
- La Guerre de demain (1888) by Émile Driant
- The Battle of Mordialloo (1888) by Samuel Mullen
- White or Yellow? A Story of the Race War of AD 1908 (1888) by William Lane
- The Battle of the Swash and the Capture of Canada (1888) by Barton Samuel
- The Stricken Nation (1890) by Henry Grattan Donnelly
- The Germ Growers (1892) by Robert Potter
- Hartmann the Anarchist (1893) by Edward Douglas Fawcett
- The Angel of the Revolution (1893) by George Griffith
- Olga Romanoff (1894) by George Griffith
- The Captain of the Mary Rose (1894) by William Laird Clowes
- The Great War in England in 1897 (1894) by William Le Queux
- The Yellow Wave (1895) by Kenneth Mackay
- The Final War (1896) by Louis Tracy
- Briton or Boer? A Tale of the Fight for Africa (1897) by George Griffith
- The Back Door (1897) by Anonymous
- Two Planets (1897) by Kurd Lasswitz
- The Yellow Danger (1898) by M. P. Shiel
- The War of the Worlds (1898) by H. G. Wells
- The Celestial Hand: A Sensational Story (1903) by Joyce Vincent
- The Riddle of the Sands (1903) by Erskine Childers
- The Coloured Conquest (1904) by “Rata” (Thomas Richard Roydhouse)
- The Invasion of 1910 (1906) by William Le Queux
- The Australian Crisis (1907) by C. H. Kirmess
- A hero of Babylon (1907) by C. A. Jeffries, May
- The War in the Air (1908) by H. G. Wells
- La Guerre infernale (1908) by Pierre Giffard
- Spies of the Kaiser (1909) by William Le Queux
- The Swoop! or How Clarence Saved England: A Tale of the Great Invasion (1909), by P. G. Wodehouse
- White Australia or, The Empty North (1909) by Randolph Bedford
- The Unparalleled Invasion (1910) by Jack London
- The Invasion of England (1911) by Richard Harding Davis - Scribner's Magazine, Volume 50, Number 6 (1911)
- Private Selby (1912) by Edgar Wallace
- The Air Scout: A Tale of National Defense (1912) by Strang, H.
- The Air Patrol: A Tale of the North-West Frontier (1913) by Strang, H.
- When William Came (1913) by Saki
- The World Set Free (1914) by H. G. Wells
- All For His Country (1915) by John Ulrich Giesy
- The Fall of a Nation (1916) by Thomas Dixon Jr.
- The Invasion of the United States Series, 1916 series of juvenile novels by H. Irving Hancock about a German invasion of the U.S.

=== Post-World War I ===
- The Terror of the Air by William Le Queux (1920)
- The Flying Submarine by Ivan Petrushevich (1922)
- The Absolute at Large (1922) by Karel Čapek
- Beneath an Ardent sun (1923) by Sir Frank James Fox
- The Moon Men by Edgar Rice Burroughs (1925)
- The Tunnel Thru the Air; Or, Looking Back from 1940 by William Delbert Gann (1927)
- Armageddon 2419 A.D. by Philip Francis Nowlan (1928)
- The Airlords of Han by Philip Francis Nowlan (1929)
- The Red Napoleon by Floyd Gibbons (1929)
- War with the Newts (1936) by Karel Čapek
- Fools' Harvest (1939) by Erle Cox
- The Death Guard by Philip George Chadwick (1939)
- Sixth Column by Robert A. Heinlein (1941)
- The Puppet Masters by Robert A. Heinlein (1951)
- The Mouse That Roared (1955) by Leonard Wibberley
- Not This August by C.M. Kornbluth (1955)
- Point Ultimate by Jerry Sohl (1955)
- A Time to die by Kap Pothan (1967)
- The Invasion by John Hay (1968)
- A Piece of Resistance (1970) by Clive Egleton
- The First Team (1971) by John Ball
- Vandenberg (1971) by Oliver Lange
- Rule Britannia (novel) (1972) by Daphne du Maurier
- Operaatio Finlandia by Arto Paasilinna (1972)
- The Camp of the Saints by Jean Raspail (1973)
- The Texas-Israeli War: 1999 (1974) by Jake Saunders (writer) and Howard Waldrop
- Before Armageddon: An Anthology of Victorian and Edwardian Imaginative Fiction Published Before 1914 edited by Michael Moorcock (1975)
- England Invaded (1977), a collection of six popular invasion literature stories, edited by Michael Moorcock, published in 1977
- The Third World War: August 1985 (1978) and The Third World War: The Untold Story (1982) by General Sir John Hackett
- A Nasty Little War (1979) by Page Michael
- The Survivalist series (1981–1993) by Jerry Ahern
- The Ashes series (1983–2003) by William W. Johnstone
- Red Storm Rising (1986) by Tom Clancy
- Red Army (1989) by Ralph Peters
- The War in 2020 (1991) Ralph Peters
- Cauldron (1993) by Larry Bond
- Tomorrow series (1993–1999) by John Marsden
- Debt of Honor (1994) Tom Clancy
- Protect and Defend (1999) by Eric L. Harry
- Invasion by Eric L. Harry (2000)
- The Bear and the Dragon (2000) Tom Clancy

== See also ==
- Alien invasion
- Alternate history
- Imperial German plans for the invasion of the United States
- World War III in popular culture
