= Private Selby =

1912 novel by Edgar Wallace

- Author: Edgar Wallace
- Language: English
- Genre: Thriller
- Publisher: Ward Lock
- Publication date: 1912
- Publication place: United Kingdom
- Media type: Print
- Pages: 196
- ISBN: 1973368919

Private Selby is a 1912 thriller novel by the British writer Edgar Wallace. It was one of a number of books and plays written before the First World War about the dangers of a future German invasion of Britain. The hero Dick Selby had first appeared in a serial in the Sunday Journal in 1909 and was modelled on Wallace himself.
