= The Great War in England in 1897 =

1894 novel by William Le Queux

- Cover illustraion of the first edition
- Author: William Le Queux
- Illustrators: Captain Cyril Field; T.S.C. Crowther
- Language: English
- Genre: Invasion literature
- Publisher: Tower Publishing Co.
- Publication date: 1894
- Publication place: United Kingdom
- Media type: Print, Hardback
- Pages: 330
- OCLC: 55152025
- Text: The Great War in England in 1897 at Project Gutenberg

The Great War in England in 1897 was written by William Le Queux and published in 1894.

Le Queux's work is an early example of Invasion literature genre, which began with The Battle of Dorking in 1871, where the British are soundly defeated by an invading German army. The Battle of Dorking was written by George Chesney, originally as a warning against the further demobilisation of the British armed forces.

It was first serialised in the weekly paper Answers. It was a huge success, and after being published as a book, it went through eight editions.

== Plot ==
Le Queux's novel depicts Britain being invaded by coalition forces led by France and Russia, who make several early advances, but the brave English patriots fight on and eventually manage to turn the tide, especially after Germany enters the war on the side of the British.

By the end of the story, the invasion goes the other way as the victors divide the spoils: Britain seizes Algeria and Russian Central Asia, thus decisively winning The Great Game, and Germany annexes more of mainland France in addition to Alsace-Lorraine, thus leaving the enemies crushed and both the British and German empires the dominant forces of Europe.

== Historical approach ==
From a historical perspective, the book is interesting in depicting the precise reverse of the alliances of the actual World War I which broke out two decades after its publication: France and Russia, which had recently allied to one another, are depicted as its implacable cruel foes, while Imperial Germany is the gallant ally coming to Britain's aid in the nick of time.

As evidenced by the book's great popularity, the scenario of such an alliance seemed plausible to the British public in 1894; in 1895 Britain and Russia came close to war over the Panjdeh Incident, while in 1898 Britain and France were on the verge of war during the Fashoda Incident. By contrast, Britain was still on fairly friendly terms with Germany and with Austria-Hungary and Italy, Germany's allies in the Triple Alliance.

The fate of the story's treacherous villain who, with all his plots unmasked flees to Spain and there meets an ignominious end, might have been inspired by the fate of Richard Pigott. The author of the "Pigott forgeries" had in 1889 tried to defame Charles Stewart Parnell, and after his plot was discovered, fled to Madrid and there killed himself. At the time of writing, this was a recent and well-known scandal.

The Entente Cordiale of 1904 changed the diplomatic and military landscape, which was reflected in fictional writings. Thus, in 1906, Le Queux wrote The Invasion of 1910, which featured Germany invading and occupying Britain and stressed the need to prepare for war with Germany. France and Russia became Britain's World War I allies.

== Influences on other works ==
The Great War in England is considered to have influenced, directly and indirectly, many subsequent works. Specifically, H. G. Wells' The War of the Worlds. In Wells' book, as in Le Queux's, a relentless enemy makes a devastating surprise attack and penetrates to the heart of London. In many ways, however, Wells' book seems a deliberate antithesis to Le Queux's nationalism: in the Wells book, the attack is extraterrestrial with the invading Martians posing a deadly threat to all humanity equally; human weapons are futile against the invaders, who are overcome only by earthly microbes; and in the aftermath, the nations of chastened humanity are drawn together.

== Anthologies ==
- Before Armageddon: An Anthology of Victorian and Edwardian Imaginative Fiction Published Before 1914 (1976)

== See also ==
- The Invasion of 1910
- Invasion literature
