= Out of the Ashes (novel) =

Novel set after a nuclear and biological holocaust

- First edition
- Author: William W. Johnstone
- Series: Ashes series
- Publisher: Zebra Books; Pinnacle
- Publication date: 1983
- Pages: 478
- ISBN: 0821711377
- OCLC: 11172459
- Followed by: Fire in the Ashes (1983)

Out of the Ashes is the first book in The Ashes series by William W. Johnstone.

== Overview ==
The book depicts life after a nuclear and biological holocaust has wiped out most of the world, and follows main character Ben Raines, a former Hellhound and ex-mercenary, as he explores the remnants of the United States in an attempt to document the effects of the bombs and the chaos that ensues.

Along the way, he meets a number of people, and explores towns devastated by marauders, murderers, and thugs, and the lives of him and his companions are constantly at risk. As time passes, Ben Raines is eventually encouraged to lead a new community, and eventually enters into a battle for freedom with the now over-reaching Federal Government.

== Major characters ==
Ben Raines
A former "Hellhound" and mercenary, Ben Raines is a skilled combatant. Following his military career, he entered into writing, and wrote a number of books, to moderate success.

Hilton Logan
A Senator during the times leading up to the dropping of the bombs, Logan quickly rises to the Presidency after many of the ranking officials in the U.S. Government are killed by the bombs and associated assassinations.

== Minor characters ==
Fran Piper
Fran is the only other person known to have survived in the town Ben Raines lived in. She briefly accompanies him as he travels out to explore after the initial event.

Carl Raines
Carl Raines is the brother of Ben Raines. After the bombs fall, Carl finds himself allying with a white supremacy group out of Chicago, and estranges himself from his brother for sympathizing with other races.

Lamar Chase
Dr. Lamar Chase is a skilled doctor and saves the life of Ben Raines and others on numerous occasions.

Salina Kyle
Salina Kyle is a friend of Cecil Jeffreys, and eventually of Ben Raines as well.

Bull Dean
Colonel Bull Dean was Ben Raines' former commander and a highly respected member of the military. After his death was faked, he went on to organize several thousand super-patriots in an attempt to return the United States to a freedom oriented, small government system.

Jerre Hunter
Jerre is a young, idealistic 19-year-old girl when she first runs across Ben Raines. After a short but intense relationship, Ben teaches her to fend for herself, and she eventually splits off to try to save what is left of a crumbling world.

Ignatious "Ike" McGowan
A former Navy SEAL, Ike is skilled in combat. After marrying and giving up his peace and quiet dream, he joins the Tri-State movement.

Cecil Jeffreys
Cecil is appointed as the defector leader of a group in the southern states called New Africa, but after a number of troubles finds himself unable to continue that movement. Eventually he joins up with Ben Raines and is named Lieutenant Governor of the Tri-States.
