= The Death Guard =

1939 novel by Philip George Chadwick

- First edition
- Author: Philip George Chadwick
- Language: English
- Genre: Science fiction novel
- Publisher: Hutchinson
- Publication date: 1939 [Paperback edition with introduction by Brian W Aldiss, 1992]
- Publication place: England
- Media type: Print (Hardcover & Paperback)
- ISBN: 978-0-14-017060-3

The Death Guard is the only published novel of the English author Philip George Chadwick (1893 in Batley, Yorkshire – 1955 in Brighton, Sussex). Although the author is virtually unknown to the wider public, his work has received attention from literary scholars. The novel contains many themes later developed by L. Ron Hubbard and James Blish. Chadwick was a political thinker with socialist tendencies, a Fabian and subsequently an Independent and a disciple of H. G. Wells.

Legend has it that H.G. Wells used to refer to this book as one of the greatest he had ever read. It was written shortly after World War I, but by the time it was picked up for publication, World War II was already underway and allegedly, Chadwick had been killed in combat, though the 1992 paperback states that he died in 1955. To complicate matters even further, the printing house that was handling the first run of the novel was bombed in an air raid, and almost all copies were destroyed. Consequently, most science fiction fans wrote off The Death Guard as pure myth, a figment of Wells's prodigious imagination, and for years it was considered a lost novel. In 1992 it was republished, with an introduction by Brian Aldiss.

The Death Guard was cited in Karl Edward Wagner's "The Thirteen Best Science Fiction Horror Novels" and Ramsey Campbell's "Thirteen Novels on the Edge of Horror".

== Plot summary ==
In its tale of a chemist who creates an army of bloodthirsty plant-based humanoids out of a desire to abolish war once and for all (the rationale being that no country would attack England if it were known she possessed such a defence), the book foreshadowed the rise of nuclear weapons and Cold War politics. Continental Europe forms an alliance and invades Britain.

The book is divided into three parts. In the first part of this novel we meet the inventors of the artificial life. We follow their story from their first meeting through the time when they relocate their lab to the Congo for its more conducive weather conditions. The first we hear of the matured Death Guard (nicknamed Pugs) is via a radio broadcast that is ended prematurely by the hideous death of the announcer.

The next part is a tour of the process of making and growing the "pugs", as the protagonist "enlists" in one of factories and gets a firsthand look at what his uncle and grandfather had wrought.

The third section recounts the war with continental Europe and the breakdown of infrastructure. Involving poisonous electric gas, "humanite" bombs (atomic bombs), and the unfeeling march of the Death Guard across the very land they were designed to protect. Later the Death Guard continues to wander unchecked across the broken landscape even after all the enemy has been killed. The resulting carnage reduces whole cities and towns in Britain to smoking rubble.

== Adaptations ==
It was adapted for radio for broadcast on New Hampshire radio stations, WKNH Radio and NHPR starring Edward X. Young and produced and directed by Kate Linaker (aka Kate Phillips).
