= Herbert Wrigley Wilson =

British journalist and historian (1866–1940)

Herbert Wrigley Wilson (1866 – 12 July 1940), known often only as H. W. Wilson, was a British journalist and naval historian.

The eldest son of the Reverend George Edwin Wilson (Vicar of St. John's, Huddersfield, in West Yorkshire, and later of Great Missenden in Buckinghamshire) and Cecilia Wrigley, Wilson was educated at Durham School and Trinity College, Oxford. Like three of his five brothers, he became a journalist. According to the memoirs of his brother G. H. Wilson, editor of the Cape Times, H. W. Wilson was "chief leader writer" and assistant editor of the Daily Mail from 1898 until his death during 1940. According to the newspaper's owner, Alfred Harmsworth, 1st Viscount Northcliffe, Wilson was the "mental backbone of the newspaper".

From 1914 to 1919, Wilson was joint editor with John Alexander Hammerton of the periodical The Great War: The Standard History of the All-Europe Conflict, published by the Amalgamated Press. The first volume was largely concerned with justifying Britain's entry into the war, and with encouraging the British people to sign up and fight. In its entirety, it ran to 13 volumes.

Other than his newspaper work, Wilson was also co-author, with William Le Queux, of a novel entitled The Invasion of 1910 (1906), and was the author of numerous books about naval and military history:

- The Protection of Our Commerce in War (1896)
- Ironclads in Acton (1897)
- The Forthcoming Naval Review and Its Predecessors (1897)
- The Royal Navy: A History from the Earliest Times to the Present (7 vols., 1897–1903)
- Nelson and His Times (1898)
- When War Breaks Out (1898)
- The Growth of the World's Armaments (1898)
- The Naval Situation with Textual Tables (1899)
- Adam Duncan (1731–1804) (1899)
- The Downfall of Spain (1900)
- With the Flag to Pretoria (1900–01)
- After Pretoria (1902)
- New Light on Napoleon's Invasion Projects (1902)
- Mr. Chamberlain's New Policy (1903)
- Japan's Fight for Freedom (1905)
- The Great War (13 vols., 1914–19)
- Convicted Out of Her Own Mouth: The Record of German Crimes (1917)
- Battleships in Action (1919)
- Hush, or the Hydrophone Service (1920)
- Northcliffe House (1927)
- The War Guilt (1928)
- His Majesty the King (1935)
