= Oliver Lange =

American novelist

- Born: John Warren Wadleigh; December 14, 1927; New York City
- Died: September 24, 2013 (aged 85); Bandon, Oregon
- Occupations: Novelist; art critic; painter; sculptor

John Warren Wadleigh (1927–2013), best known by his pen name Oliver Lange, was an American author, artist, and art critic based in Santa Fe, New Mexico. He is best known for his 1971 novel Vandenberg.

== Life ==
Wadleigh was born and raised in Manhattan's Hell's Kitchen. He joined the Army as World War II was coming to a close and later attended Columbia University, where he met former Santa Fean author and teacher John Richard Humphreys, who became his friend and mentor. In 1958, while working as an editorial assistant for The New Yorker, he published his first novel, The Bitter Passion, already under the Lange pseudonym.

Soon after that, yearning for wilderness, he relocated to Santa Fe, New Mexico, "six miles from the nearest phone. They deliver a telegram in two to four days, and by then whatever it said isn't so important".

Despite this claimed remoteness, Lange became active in the Santa Fean cultural scene, going as far as co-founding with fellow writers Oliver LaFarge and Spud Johnson the Pasatiempo arts magazine, to which he contributed as an art critic.

In the late 1980s, he moved to Friday Harbor, Washington, and then to Bandon, Oregon, where he died. He married three times and had seven children.

== Work ==
Lange wrote around 50 novels, of which 13 were published, most of them action thrillers. Despite the pulpy topics and "overtly masculine" points of view, the books were well-received and his writing often praised by critics.

=== Vandenberg ===
Lange's most famous and reverberating novel was Vandenberg, a Cold War near future tale starring fugitives in the New Mexico wilderness after the successful invasion of the US by the Soviets. The eponymous hero, an individualist who deserted civilization long before the Russian attack, choosing instead to live alone with his mentally disabled son in a squalid ranch, has several traits in common with the author: he is a World War II veteran, a painter, and an expert survivalist.

Sprinkled across the third-person narrative abound inserts headed as "Communications", printed in italics, that transcribe Soviet files, quotations from actual writers on war (especially Robert Ardrey), and Vandenberg's own journals, in which he reflects on the easy defeat of the United States and the sheepish acceptance of the new regime by its people, condemning the American values of the novel's time as materialistic and shallow, which in turn have produced a "tractable, malleable...spineless people". Although the book's undertones, especially the hero's social views and racial profiling, strike as politically incorrect today, some reviewers at the time picked up on Lange's social criticism. The pocket edition by Bantam Books compared the self-centered, stubborn Vandenberg with the character of Galt from Ayn Rand's Atlas Shrugged.

Aside from the main plotline, the book shows a warm affection for the New Mexico countryside, which is clearly the writer's own. The local Native Americans, who have managed to endure and preserve their culture under the succeeding Spanish and American rulers, are shown able to do it under the Russians, too.

Several plot points in Vandenberg somehow anticipated John Milius' 1984 film Red Dawn. Lange himself resented the film for these uncredited similarities.

=== Partial bibliography ===
- The Bitter Passion (E.P. Dutton, 1958)
- Vandenberg (Stein & Day, 1971)
- Incident at La Junta (Stein & Day, 1973)
- Red Snow (Seaview Books, 1978)
- Next of Kin (Seaview Books, 1980)
- Land of the Long Shadow (Seaview Books, 1981)
- Pas de Deux (Seaview Books, 1982)
- Hour of the Lily (1984)
- The Devil at Home (Stein & Day, 1986)
- Making It (E. P. Dutton, 1989)
