= William W. Johnstone =

American author (1938–2004)

William Wallace Johnstone
- Born: October 28, 1938; Missouri, United States
- Died: February 8, 2004 (aged 65); Knoxville, Tennessee, U.S.
- Occupation: Novelist
- Writing career
- Pen name: William Mason
- Genres: Western, horror, science fiction, military
- Website: www.williamjohnstone.net

William Wallace Johnstone (October 28, 1938 – February 8, 2004) was an American author most known for his Western, horror, and survivalist novels.

== Life and career ==
=== Early life ===
Born and raised in southern Missouri, Johnstone was the youngest of four children. His father was a minister and his mother a school teacher. He left school when he was 15 and worked in a carnival and as a deputy sheriff. He later served in the United States Army and, upon returning to civilian life, worked in radio broadcasting for 16 years.

=== Career ===
Johnstone started his writing career in 1970, but did not have any works published until 1979 (The Devil's Kiss). He wrote close to two hundred books in numerous genres, including suspense, horror, men's adventure, post-apocalyptic, and Westerns. His main publication series were Mountain Man, The First Mountain Man, Ashes (with Ben Raines as the protagonist), and Eagles. His own personal favorite novel was The Last of the Dog Team (1980). He also authored two novels under the pseudonym William Mason. His works have been translated into languages other than English.

Johnstone lived in Tallulah, Louisiana and later in Shreveport, Louisiana.

Johnstone died in 2004 at the age of 65. His death remained officially unconfirmed for two years.

=== Posthumously published books ===
Copyright pages of at least one book published in 2006 noted that Johnstone had died and that a "carefully selected author" was chosen to carry on his legacy. J. A. Johnstone, his niece, continues her uncle's series. The decision to continue publishing Johnstone books under his name was met with criticism by Lee Duran, a columnist with The Joplin Globe, who criticized the editing of one book, writing, "giving billing to the dead is sort of like ghostwriting in reverse with sales depending upon the name of someone who really is a ghost".

== Critical reception ==
His 1993 novel Eyes of Eagles received a largely positive review from Publishers Weekly, which read, "Johnstone [...], on rare occasion, molds history to fit his tale. However, neither these liberties, nor the one-dimensional characters dampen this rousing, two-fisted saga of the growing American frontier".

Talons of Eagles, his first hardcover, was reviewed by Publishers Weekly: "Despite some interesting period lore, the narrative is padded with lengthy historical discussions and further weakened by lackluster prose".

His 1995 novel What the Heart Knows: A Love Story was his mainstream fiction debut. It received a negative review from Publishers Weekly, which called its storytelling "earnest and heartfelt" but noted "this tale about a May–September affair between a small-town Southern girl and a hard-nosed businessman never develops into anything more than an extended romantic cliché". Kirkus Reviews wrote that What the Heart Knows was "a sentimental wannabe Bridges of Madison County, strictly for the romance crowd".

Publishers Weekly received Scream of Eagles negatively, writing, "this is a preposterous story, with little historical accuracy or value, featuring a shallow caricature of a western hero".

Library Journal gave a starred review to A Lone Star Christmas, writing that it was "[a] well-paced saga with cattle rustling, bar fights, painful secrets, unrequited love, and a baby born on Christmas day".

Butch Cassidy: The Lost Years received a positive review from Publishers Weekly, which wrote, "Johnstone is a masterful storyteller, creating a tale that is fanciful and funny, exciting and surprisingly convincing".

A Big Sky Christmas received a starred review from Library Journal that offered the following verdict: "Johnstone and his nephew [sic] have written an excellent Western with plenty of action and suspense along with great secondary characters and story lines that will appeal to historical fiction readers, too".

A Frontier Christmas received a negative review from Library Journal, which wrote that, though "The Johnstones consistently write great Westerns", there is "the relentless barrage of terrible events in the story line" and to "read this one for the action, not the Christmas cheer".

A Library Journal review of A Texas Hill Country Christmas read that the novel was a "rollicking Western" that is "full of gunfights, outlaws, and an unforgettable holiday".

== Selected works ==
- The Last Mountain Man. Zebra/Kensignton, 1984. ISBN 9780821768563
- War of the Mountain Man (The Last Mountain Man Series). Zebra, 1990. ISBN 9780821729892
- The First Mountain Man. Pinnacle, 1991. ISBN 978-1558175655
- Eyes of Eagles (The Eagles Series). Zebra, 1993. ISBN 978-0-7860-2567-1
- Talons of Eagles (The Eagles Series). Zebra, 1995. ISBN 978-0-7860-0249-8
- What the Heart Knows: A Love Story. Kensington, 1995. ISBN 978-1-57566-028-8
- Scream of Eagles (The Eagles Series). Kensington, 1996. ISBN 978-0-7860-0447-8
- The Drifter (The Last Gunfighter Series). Zebra, 2000. ISBN 9780786037605
- Preacher (The First Mountain Man Series). Pinnacle, 2001. ISBN 9780786014415
- Blood Valley. Pinnacle, 2006. ISBN 978-0786017706

=== With J. A. Johnstone ===
- Pride of Eagles (The Eagles Series). Pinnacle, 2006. ISBN 978-0786017362
- Preacher's Quest (The First Mountain Man Series). Pinnacle, 2007. ISBN 978-0786017393
- Matt Jensen: The Last Mountain Man. Pinnacle, 2007. ISBN 9781432880163
- Avenger (The Last Gunfighter Series). Pinnacle, 2007. ISBN 978-0786017379
- Six Ways From Sunday (The Blood Valley Series). Pinnacle, 2009. ISBN 978-0786019984
- Lone Star Christmas (The Christmas Series). Pinnacle, 2011. ISBN 9780786028498
- Butch Cassidy: The Lost Years. Kensington, 2013. ISBN 978-1-4104-5681-6
- A Big Sky Christmas (The Christmas Series). Pinnacle/Kensington, 2013. ISBN 9780786032679
- A Frontier Christmas (The Christmas Series). Pinnacle/Kensington, 2013. ISBN 9780786033607
- A Texas Hill Country Christmas (The Christmas Series). Pinnacle/Kensington, 2015. ISBN 9780786035908
- Trigger Warning. Kensington, 2018. ISBN 9780786040513
- Cruel Winter of the Mountain Man (The First Mountain Man Series). Kensington, 2022. ISBN 9780786048946

=== With Fred Austin ===
- Savage Country (The Last Gunfighter Series). Pinnacle, 2006. ISBN 978-0786016310
- Preacher's Fortune (The First Mountain Man Series). Pinnacle, 2013. ISBN 978-0786033959
