= The Battle of Dorking =

1871 novella by George Chesney

The Battle of Dorking: Reminiscences of a Volunteer
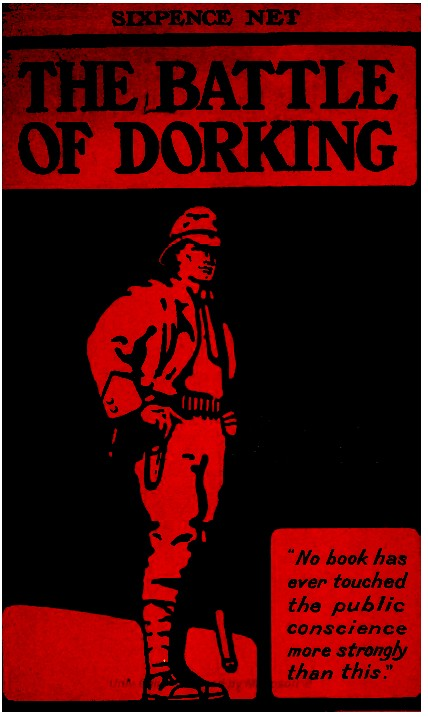
- Cover of the 1914 edition
- Author: George Chesney
- Language: English
- Genre: Invasion literature, science fiction
- Publisher: Blackwood (UK); Lippincott, Grambo & Co (US) (reprint Oxford Press 1971)
- Publication date: 1871
- Publication place: United Kingdom
- Media type: Print (hardcover & paperback)
- Pages: 95
- ISBN: 0-19-283285-9

The Battle of Dorking: Reminiscences of a Volunteer is an 1871 novella by George Chesney, starting the genre of invasion literature and an important precursor of science fiction. Written just after the German victory in the Franco-Prussian War, it describes an invasion of Britain by a German-speaking country referred to in oblique terms as The Other Power or The Enemy.

== Background ==
Chesney was a captain in the Royal Engineers and had grown concerned over the (as he saw it) ramshackle state of Britain's armed forces. He used fiction as a device to promote his views after letters and journalism on the issue had failed to impress public opinion. The Franco-Prussian War (1870–1871) had just demonstrated the speed, superiority, and adaptability of the Prussian Army, which meant that Chesney's depiction of a fast-moving and determined invader hit a nerve.

== Plot ==
The story is told as a narrative by an unnamed veteran who participated in the Battle of Dorking. He is recounting the final days before and during the invasion of Britain. It is addressed to his grandchildren as an event fifty years earlier. Beginning sometime after an event similar to the Franco-Prussian War, concerns grow with the mobilisation of armed forces near the Netherlands. The Royal Navy is destroyed by torpedoes, and an invasion force suddenly lands near Worthing, Sussex.

Demilitarisation and lack of training force the army to mobilise auxiliary units from the general public, led by ineffective and inexperienced officers. The two armies converge outside Dorking, Surrey (located at a strategically vulnerable gap in the North Downs), where the British line is cut through by the advancing enemy and the survivors on the British side are forced to flee.

The story ends with the conquest of Britain; the ransom the victors impose makes the country destitute. The fate of England is compared to that of France. Also humiliated, France is able to rise from the blow because its wealth is in its fields and size rather than colonies and business.

The British Empire is broken up. Canada and the British West Indies are ceded to the United States. Australia is forced to separate. India is lost and, without support, its British community is destroyed. The new dominant naval power takes Gibraltar and Malta. Ireland is free but descends into anarchy.

== Publication history ==
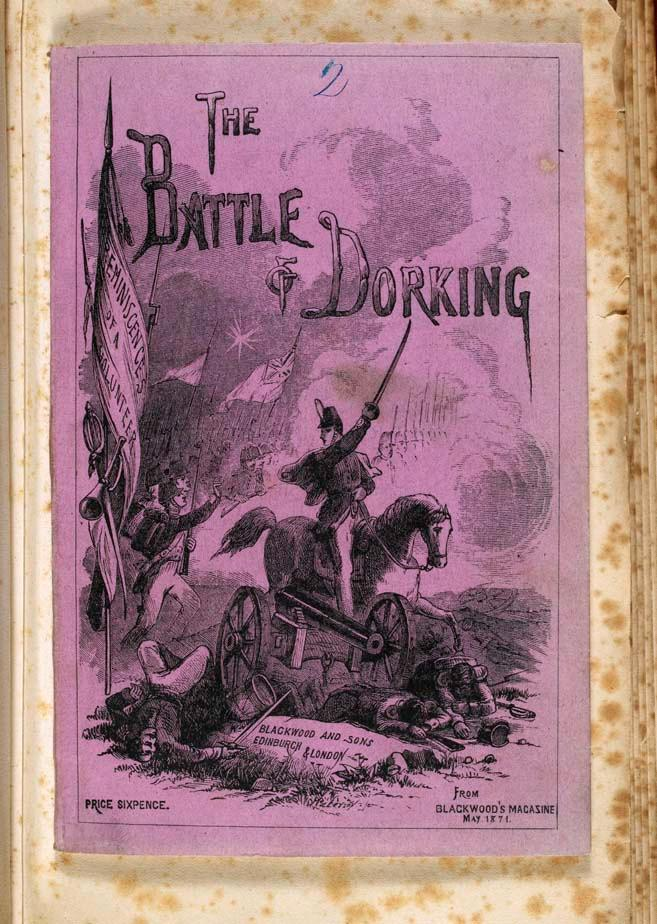
Front cover of the 1871 pamphlet edition of The Battle of Dorking

The Battle of Dorking was first published anonymously as a serial in the May 1871 Blackwood's Magazine and then in pamphlet form from the same publisher by the end of the month before finally appearing as a novel. It went through several editions and engaged the interest of soldiers and politicians, as well as the reading public.

The book was originally subtitled "Reminiscences of a Volunteer" but other editions, say "The German conquest of England" and "The Fall of England?" It was translated into German by Wilhelm Hübbe-Schleiden in 1879. It has appeared in a number of collections, including Michael Moorcock's Before Armageddon: An Anthology of Victorian and Edwardian Imaginative Fiction Published Before 1914 (1975). It is available for download from Project Gutenberg.

== Sources ==
Blackwood's Magazine

- Chesney, G. T. (May 1871). "The Battle of Dorking". Blackwood's. London. ISSN 0006-436X.

1871 book

- Chesney, George Tomkyns. The Battle of Dorking. New York: G. P. Putnam & sons. p. 64.
