= George Chesney =

British Army officer, politician, and writer

General Sir George Chesney KCB CSI CIE
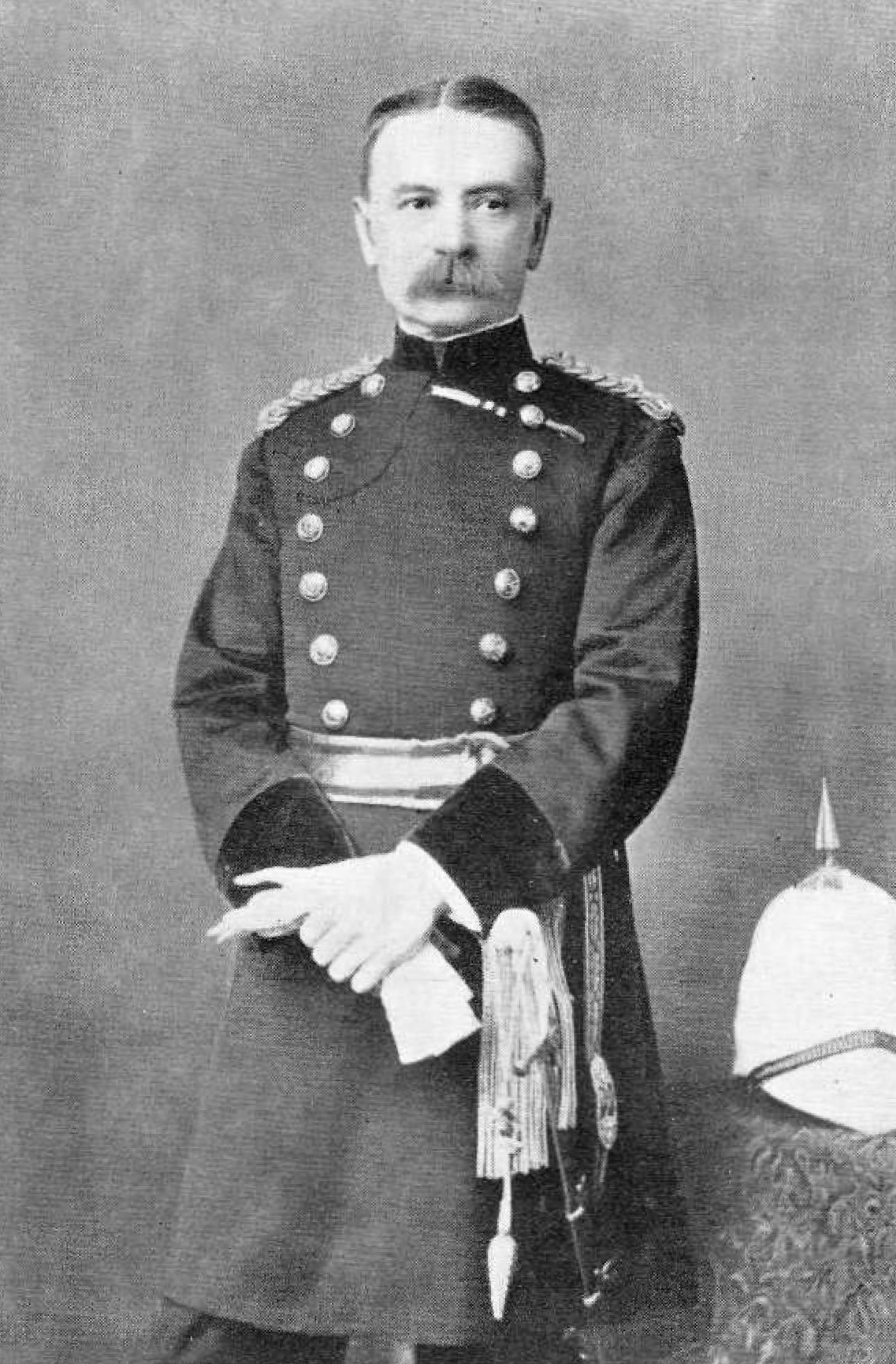

Personal details
- Born: 30 April 1830 Tiverton, Devon
- Died: 31 March 1895 (aged 64) London, England

General Sir George Tomkyns Chesney KCB CSI CIE (30 April 1830 – 31 March 1895) was a British Army officer, politician, and writer. He is remembered as the author of the novella The Battle of Dorking (1871), a founding work in the genre of invasion literature.

== Early life and education ==
George Tomkyns Chesney was born on 30 April 1830 in Tiverton, Devon, one of six children of Sophia Augusta (Cauty) Chesney and Charles Cornwallis Chesney. His elder sister Matilda Marian Pullan, wrote numerous books, articles, and an encyclopedia on needlework, and became a successful businesswoman in London and later the United States. His elder brother, Colonel Charles Cornwallis Chesney, achieved prominence as a soldier and military writer.

Chesney was educated at Blundell's School, Tiverton, and at Addiscombe Military Seminary (1847–48).

== Military career ==
Chesney joined the Bengal Engineers as a second lieutenant in 1848. He was employed for some years in the public works department and, on the outbreak of the Indian rebellion of 1857, joined the Ambala column and was field engineer at the battle of Badli-ki-Serai, brigade-major of engineers throughout the siege of Delhi and was severely wounded in the assault (he received a medal and clasp and a brevet majority).

In 1860, he was appointed head of a new department in connection with the public works accounts. His work on Indian Polity (1868), dealing with the administration of the several departments of the Indian government, attracted wide attention and remains a permanent text-book. The originator of the Royal Indian Civil Engineering College at Coopers Hill, Englefield Green, Egham, he was also its first president (1871–1880).

He was promoted to lieutenant colonel in 1869, colonel in 1877, major general in 1886, lieutenant-general in 1887, colonel-commandant of Royal Engineers in 1890, and general in 1892. From 1881, he was in the government of India, and he was made a Companion of Order of the Star of India (CSI) and a Companion of the Order of the Indian Empire (CIE).

From 1886 to 1892, as military member of the governor-generals council, he carried out many much-needed military reforms. He also championed Indianization, the admission of Indians into the higher (British) officer corps of the Indian Army. However, he was unsuccessful mainly because of the implacable opposition of General Sir Frederick (later Lord) Roberts, the commander-in-chief of the Indian Army, who contended that the officer posts were "properly reserved for the governing (i.e. British) race".

== Literary career ==
Chesney was a frequent contributor to periodical literature. In 1871, he published, initially anonymously, a highly-influential short story (or novella), The Battle of Dorking in Blackwood's Magazine. This was a vivid account of a supposed invasion of England by the Germans after their victory over France: it was subsequently republished in many editions and translations, and is considered a founding piece of the invasion literature genre.

He also published several novels, including A True Reformer (1873) The Dilemma (1875), The Private Secretary (1881), and The Lesters (1893) although none achieved the popular success of The Battle of Dorking.

== Politics ==
On leaving India in 1892, Chesney was elected to the Parliament of the United Kingdom as a Conservative Party candidate, as member for Oxford. He was chairman of the Committee of Service Members of the House of Commons until his death.

== Honours ==
Chesney was made a Companion of the Order of the Bath (C.B.) at the jubilee of 1887, and a Knight Commander of the Order of the Bath (K.C.B.) in the New Year's Honours list 1 January 1890.

== Death and burial ==
Chesney died suddenly of angina pectoris at his residence, 27 Inverness Terrace, London, on 31 March 1895, and was buried at Englefield Green, Surrey, on 5 April.

== Family ==
Chesney married, in 1855, Annie Louisa, daughter of George Palmer of Purneah, Bengal. She survived him as did four sons and three daughters.

== Bibliography ==
- Kirkwood, Patrick M. (2012). "The impact of fiction on public debate in late Victorian Britain: The Battle of Dorking and the "lost career" of Sir George Tomkyns Chesney". The Graduate History Review. 4 (1): 1–16.
- Stearn, Roger T. (2014) [2004]. "Chesney, Sir George Tomkyns (1830–1895)". Oxford Dictionary of National Biography (online ed.). Oxford University Press. doi:10.1093/ref:odnb/5231. (Subscription, Wikipedia Library access or UK public library membership required.)
- Sundaram, Chandar S. (2002). "Reviving a 'dead letter': military Indianization and the ideology of Anglo-India, 1885–1891". In Gupta, Partha Sarathi; Deshpande, Anirudh (eds.). The British Raj and its Indian Armed Forces 1857–1939. New Delhi: Oxford University Press. pp. 45–97. ISBN 0195658051.
- Vibart, H.M. (1894). Addiscombe: its heroes and men of note. Westminster: Archibald Constable. pp. 556–8.

Parliament of the United Kingdom
Preceded by Alexander William Hall	Member of Parliament for Oxford; 1892–1895	Succeeded by The Viscount Valentia
