= The Invasion of 1910 =

1906 novel by William Le Queux

The Invasion of 1910: With a full account of the Siege of London
- First edition
- Authors: William Le Queux; H. W. Wilson
- Genre: Invasion literature
- Set in: United Kingdom, 1910
- Publisher: E. Nash
- Publication date: 1906
- Publication place: United Kingdom
- Media type: Print (hardback)
- OCLC: 59567217
- Text: The Invasion of 1910: With a full account of the Siege of London at Wikisource

The Invasion of 1910 is a 1906 novel written mainly by William Le Queux (along with H. W. Wilson providing the naval chapters). It is one of the most famous examples of invasion literature. It is viewed by some as an example of pre-World War I Germanophobia. It can also be viewed as prescient, as it preached the need to prepare for war with Germany.

== Background ==
The novel was originally commissioned by Alfred Harmsworth as a serial which appeared in the Daily Mail from 10 March 1906. According to historian of Germany Sir Richard Evans, the paper built up "mass alarm" by dressing its London newspaper vendors as Prussian soldiers complete with pickelhaube helmet and placards showing maps of where the 'troops' would be next day. The rewrite of the story, featuring towns and villages with large readership of the Daily Mail, greatly increased the newspaper's circulation and made a small fortune for Le Queux; it was translated into twenty-seven languages, and over one million copies of the book edition were sold. The idea for the novel is alleged to have originated from Field Marshal Earl Roberts, who regularly lectured English schoolboys on the need to prepare for war.

To Le Queux's dismay, a pirated and abridged German translation (with an altered ending) appeared the same year: Die Invasion von 1910: Einfall der Deutschen in England translated by Traugott Tamm.

In Le Queux's earlier novel, The Great War in England in 1897, it is France which invades Britain as an implacable enemy. In that book's plot, German soldiers land in Britain as allies coming to help repulse the French invasion, and are welcomed as saviours. In between Le Queux's two disparate depictions of an invaded Britain, the Entente Cordiale of 1904 changed the diplomatic and military landscape.

== Outline ==
The book takes the form of a military history and includes excerpts from the characters' journals and letters and descriptions of the fictional German campaign itself.

It is centred on an invasion by the Germans, who have managed to land a sizeable invasion force on the East Coast of England. They advance inland, cutting all telegraph lines and despoiling farmland as they go, and the British struggle to mount a proper defence, fighting a battle at Royston. The Germans eventually reach London and occupy half the city. A junior Member of Parliament declares that "Britain is not defeated" and organises a resistance movement, the "League of Defenders," despite harsh reprisals by the Germans and a severe lack of arms. The Germans seem unable to combat this and tighten their control of London and suddenly find themselves faced with a popular uprising. Eventually, a newly formed British Army marches to liberate London. The fictional war, however, is a stalemate since it appears that German forces have managed to occupy Belgium and the Netherlands.

In many ways the book's imagined war is similar to the actual Franco-Prussian War of 1871. In that war, as in the book's imagined war, the Germans overcame a badly prepared and organized army, penetrated all the way to the nation's capital where they encountered stiff resistance by mobilized citizens - though the book's resisting Londoners do not have the strong Socialist orientation of the 1871 Parisians.

== Agenda ==
The failure of the British government to prepare for a possible invasion is repeatedly mentioned, as is the phrase "they should have listened to Lord Roberts", along with many references to Roberts' patriotism. It is also pointed out that the invasion might have been counteracted more easily if every able-bodied man had had military training. Le Queux himself stated that one of his aims was to "bring home to the British public vividly and forcibly what really would occur were an enemy suddenly to appear in our midst".

== Film version ==
Le Queux's novel attracted the attention of Gaumont in 1912, who planned to change the title to The Raid of 1915 and to film two endings, one with Britain as the victor and one with Germany as the victor. The British satirical magazine Punch suggested they show the Britain victorious version in Germany and the other version in Britain. The film was finished in 1913 but its release was delayed by the British Board of Film Censors and when it was finally released in October 1914 (three months after the start of World War I), it had again been retitled, to If England were Invaded.

== See also ==
- The Great War in England in 1897
- Invasion literature
