= William Le Queux =

French-English writer (1864–1927)

William Tufnell Le Queux
- Portrait by E. O. Hoppé, 1922
- Born: 2 July 1864; London, England
- Died: 13 October 1927 (aged 63); Knokke, Belgium
- Writing career
- Genres: Mystery, thriller, and espionage

William Tufnell Le Queux (/ləˈkjuː/ lə-KYOO, French: [ləkø]; 2 July 1864 – 13 October 1927) was a French-English journalist and writer. He was also a diplomat (honorary consul for San Marino), a traveller (in Europe, the Balkans and North Africa), a flying buff who officiated at the first British air meeting at Doncaster in 1909, and a wireless pioneer who broadcast music from his own station long before radio was generally available; his claims regarding his own abilities and exploits, however, were usually exaggerated. His best-known works are the anti-French and anti-Russian invasion fantasy The Great War in England in 1897 (1894) and the anti-German invasion fantasy The Invasion of 1910 (1906), the latter becoming a bestseller.

== Early life ==
Le Queux was born in London. His father was a French draper's assistant and his mother was English. He studied art under Ignazio (or Ignace) Spiridon in Paris. He carried out a foot tour of Europe as a young man before supporting himself writing for French newspapers. In the late 1880s he returned to London where he edited the magazines Gossip and Piccadilly before joining the staff of The Globe as a parliamentary reporter in 1891. In 1893 he abandoned journalism to concentrate on writing and travelling.

His partial French ancestry did not prevent him from depicting France and the French as the villains in works of the 1890s, though later he assigned this role to Germany.

== Career ==
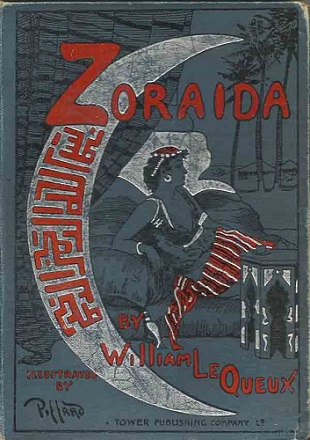
Cover of Zoraida, signed lower left by another flying buff, Harold H. Piffard

Le Queux mainly wrote in the genres of Romance, mystery, thriller, and espionage, particularly in the years leading up to World War I, when his partnership with British publishing magnate Lord Northcliffe led to the serialised publication and intensive publicising (including actors dressed as German soldiers walking along Regent Street) of pulp-fiction spy stories and invasion literature such as The Invasion of 1910, The Poisoned Bullet, and Spies of the Kaiser. These works were a common phenomenon in pre-World War I Europe, involving fictionalised stories of possible invasion or infiltration by foreign powers; Le Queux's specialty, much appreciated by Northcliffe, was the German invasion of Britain. He was also the original editor of Lord Northcliffe's War of the Nations.

=== The Parker Expedition ===
In 1908 Johan Millen approached William Le Queux about finding funding for what later became known as the Parker Expedition to Jerusalem. Le Queux wrote about it in his autobiography Things I Know about Kings, Celebrities and Crooks (1923). He wrote

One day, during the five years I lived at the Hotel Cecil, a waiter brought me a card bearing the name of Broström, with an address in Stockholm. A tall, middle-aged, clean-shaven Swede was ushered in, and handed me a letter of introduction from a friend, a certain Baroness Nernberg, who is one of the leaders of Society in the Swedish capital. This letter explained that my visitor was a well-known civil engineer in Sweden, that he was highly trustworthy, and that he had a very curious disclosure to make to me. We sat down, and certainly what he told me caused my eyes to bulge. Briefly, it was that a friend of his, a certain Professor Afzelius (sic), at Abó University, had discovered in the original text of the Book of Ezekiel preserved in the Imperial Library at Petrograd a cipher message that gave the whereabouts of the concealed treasures from King Solomon's temple.

The individual he calls Afzelius was in fact Valter Juvelius. After he was approached Le Queux says that he took the papers to a Dr Adler, a friend who was also the Chief Rabbi, to verify the documents. Le Queux says that Adler came back and said that there was something to the documents. On the basis of the positive response to the cypher documents Le Queux approached Sir C. Arthur Pearson, the proprietor of the Standard newspaper for funding for the expedition to Jerusalem. He described what happened next:

To this he most generously acceded, and an initial sum was agreed between us for its cost. I was to head the expedition to Palestine. That afternoon I walked along the Strand full of suppressed excitement.

When Le Queux informed Millen that he had secured the funding Millen told him that they were not pursuing the matter. This was because they had decided to move forward with the syndicate led by Montagu Parker. However, he did not tell Le Queux this and he was left bemused.

The author was not completely frustrated as it gave him the idea for a novel, The Treasure of Israel (known as The Great God Gold in the US), which was another international bestseller for him. In it he took much of the cypher information that Millen had given him and then added many of the elements from his earlier work The Tickencote Treasure.

=== The Invasion of 1910 ===
The Invasion of 1910, which originally appeared in serial form in the Daily Mail newspaper from 19 March 1906, was a huge success. The newspaper's circulation increased greatly, and it made a small fortune for Le Queux, eventually being translated into twenty-seven languages and selling over one million copies in book form. The idea for the novel is alleged to have originated from Field Marshal Earl Roberts, who regularly lectured English schoolboys on the need to prepare for war. He was a member of Legion of Frontiersmen. Le Queux was reportedly less than happy about an abridged German translation (with an altered ending) which appeared the same year: Die Invasion von 1910: Einfall der Deutschen in England translated by Traugott Tamm.

In 1914, the Gaumont-British Picture Corporation produced The Raid of 1915 an updated version of The Invasion of 1910, that was the first British film to feature German spies and invaders. Prior to the commencement of the Great War, the film was banned by the British Board of Film Censors, founded just one month earlier. The film was released in October 1914, retitled If England were Invaded.

=== World War I ===
At the beginning of World War I Le Queux became convinced that the Germans were out to get him for "rumbling their schemes" and requested special protection from German agents, leading to a continual struggle with the Metropolitan Police both at his local Sunbury station and through correspondence with its headquarters at New Scotland Yard. The authorities, however, in the words of Edward Henry (head of the Metropolitan Police) saw him as "not a person to be taken seriously" and saw no need to fulfill his request.

=== Radio work ===
Le Queux was interested in radio communication; he was a member of the Institute of Radio Engineers and carried out some radio experiments in 1924 in Switzerland with Dr. Petit Pierre and Max Amstutz. That same year he was elected the first President of the Hastings, St. Leonard's and District Radio Society, whose inaugural lecture was delivered on 28 April 1924 by John Logie Baird. Le Queux was eager to help Baird with his television experiments but said that all his money was tied up in Switzerland. He did however write an article, Television-a fact which appeared in the Radio Times in April 1924 which praised Baird's efforts.

=== Cinema ===
In addition to his providing the story of The Raid of 1915, he also wrote the films The White Lie (1914) and The Sons of Satan (1915); he also wrote and co-directed Sadounah (1915).

=== Other work ===
Apart from fiction, Le Queux also wrote extensively on wireless broadcasting, produced various travel works including An Observer in the Near East and several short books on Switzerland, and wrote an unrevealing and often misleading autobiography, Things I Know about Kings, Celebrities and Crooks (1923). The latter contains, among other fantastic stories, the claim by Le Queux that he saw a manuscript in French written by Rasputin stating that Jack the Ripper was a Russian doctor named Alexander Pedachenko who committed the murders to confuse and ridicule Scotland Yard.

== Bibliography ==
Le Queux wrote 150 novels dealing with international intrigue, as well as books warning of Britain's vulnerability to European invasion before World War I:

=== Novels and stories ===
- Guilty Bonds (1891)
- Strange Tales of a Nihilist (1892)
- The Great War in England in 1897 (1894)
- Zoraida (1894)
- Guilty (1895)
- The Temptress (1895)
- The Great White Queen. A Tale of Treasure And Treason (1896)
- A Secret Service, being Strange Tales of a Nihilist (1892) [reprint of Strange Tales]
- A Secret Sin, or, A Madonna of the Music Halls) (1897)
- Devil's Dice (1897)
- Whoso Findeth a Wife (1897)
- The Eye of Istar; a Romance of the Land of No Return (1897) as The Eye of Ishtar (US)
- Scribes and Pharisees; A Story of Literary London (1898)
- If Sinners Entice Thee (1898)
- The Bond of Black (1899)
- The Day of Temptation (1899)
- The Veiled Man (1899) stories
- England’s Peril (1899)
- The Wiles of the Wicked (1900)
- An Eye for an Eye (1900)
- In White Raiment (1900)
- Of Royal Blood (1900)
- Her Majesty's Minister (1901)
- The Sign of the Seven Sins (1901)
- The Gamblers (1901)
- The Court of Honour (1901)
- The Under -Secretary (1902)
- The Unnamed: A Romance of Modern Italy (1902)
- On the "Polar Star" in the Arctic Sea (1903)
- The Tickencote Treasure: Being the Story of A Silent Man, A Sealed Script and A Singular Secret (1903)
- The Seven Secrets (1903)
- Three Glass Eyes (1903)
- As We Forgive Them (1904)
- The Sign of the Stranger (1904)
- The Man from Downing Street (1904)
- The Hunchback of Westminster (1904)
- The Idol of the Town (1904)
- The Red Hat (1904)
- Sins of the City (1905)
- The Valley of the Shadow (1905)
- The Czar's Spy: The Mystery of a Silent Love (1905)
- Behind the Throne (1905)
- Who Giveth This Woman? (1905)
- The Spider’s Eye (1905)
- The Mask (1905)
- The Mystery of a Motor-Car (1906)
- The Pauper of Park Lane (1906)
- The Woman at Kensington (1906)
- The Invasion of 1910 (1906) with H. W. Wilson
- The Mysterious Mr Miller (1906)
- The House of the Wicked (1906)
- Whatsoever a Man Soweth (1906)
- Whosoever Loveth: Being the Secret of a Lady's Maid (1907)
- The Great Plot (1907)
- The Woman in the Way (1907)
- The Secret of the Square (1907)
- The Great Court Scandal (1907)
- The Crooked Way (1908)
- The Looker-On (1908)
- Stolen Sweets (1908)
- The House of Whispers (1909)
- The Red Room (1909)
- Fatal Thirteen (1909)
- Spies of the Kaiser (1909)
- Lying Lips (1910)
- The Unknown Tomorrow (1910)
- Hushed Up!: A Mystery of London (1911)
- The Money Spider (1911)
- An Eye for an Eye (1911)
- Revelations of the Secret Service (1911) stories
- The Indiscretions of a Lady's Maid, A Mystery Novel (1911)
- The Mystery of Nine (1912)
- Without Trace (1912)
- The Death-Doctor (1912) stories
- Fatal Fingers (1912)
- The Lost Million (1913)
- The Room of Secrets (1913)
- Mysteries (1913) stories
- The Hand of Allah (1914) (also as The Riddle of the Ring)
- Her Royal Highness; A Romance of the Chancelleries of Europe (1914)
- Sons of Satan (1914)
- The White Lie (1914)
- The German Spy, a Present-day story (1914)
- The War of the Nations (1914) with Edgar Wallace and others
- The Maker of Secrets (1914)
- The Four Faces (1914)
- The Sign of Silence (1915)
- The Devil's Spawn (1915)
- The Mysterious Three (1915)
- At the Sign of the Sword (1915)
- The German Spy System from Within (1915)
- The Mystery of the Green Ray (1915)
- The Double Shadow (1915)
- The White Glove (1915)
- The Man about Town (1916)
- Number 70, Berlin (1916)
- The Spy Hunter (1916) stories
- The Way to Win (1916)
- Cinders of Harley Street (1916)
- The Broken Thread (1916)
- The Place of Dragons: A Mystery (1916)
- Annette of the Argonne: A Story of the French Front (1916)
- The Scandal-Monger (1917) stories
- Beryl of the Biplane (1917)
- The Breath of Suspicion (1917)
- The Devil's Carnival (1917)
- No Greater Love (1917)
- Two in a Tangle (1917)
- Bolo, The Super-Spy, by Armand Mehjan (1918)
- Sant of the Secret Service: Some Revelations of Spies and Spying (1918)
- The Secret Life of the Ex-Tsaritza (1918)
- The Little Blue Goddess (1918)
- The Lure of Love (1918)
- The Yellow Ribbon (1918)
- The Catspaw (1918)
- The Sister Disciple (1918)
- The Stolen Statesman: Being the Story of a Hushed-Up Mystery (1918)
- The Doctor of Pimlico, Being the Disclosure of a Great Crime (1919)
- Cipher Six: A Mystery (1919)
- The Forbidden Word (1919)
- The King's Incognito (1919)
- No. 7 Saville Square (1920)
- Secrets of the Foreign Office (1920)
- Whither Thou Goest (1920)
- The Heart of a Princess: A Romance of To-Day (1920)
- The Intriguers (1920)
- The Secret Telephone (1920)
- The Terror of the Air (1920)
- The Red Widow, Or The Death-Dealers of London (1920)
- Mademoiselle of Monte Carlo: A Mystery of To-day (1921)
- The Fifth Finger: A Mystery (1921)
- The Open Verdict: A Mystery (1921)
- This House to Let (1921)
- The Lady in Waiting: A Royal Romance (1921)
- The Marked Man (1921)
- The Power of the Borgias (1921)
- The Golden Face: A Great Crook Romance (1922)
- The Stretton Street Affair (1922)
- Three Knots (1922)
- The Voice from the Void: The Great Wireless Mystery (1922)
- The Young Archduchess (1922)
- The Bronze Face (1923) as Behind the Bronze Door (US)
- Where the Desert Ends (1923)
- A Woman's Debt (1924)
- Fine Feathers (1924)
- The Crystal Claw (1924)
- The Blue Bungalow: A Mystery (1925)
- The Broadcast Mystery (1925)
- The Valrose Mystery (1925)
- Hidden Hands (1926) as The Dangerous Game (US)
- The Letter "E" (1926) as The Tattoo Mystery (US)
- Blackmailed (1926)
- The Fatal Face (1926)
- The Mystery of Mademoiselle (1926)
- The Black Owl (1926)
- The Scarlet Sign (1926)
- The Lawless Hand (1927)
- The Chameleon (1927) as Poison Shadows (US)
- Double Nought (1927) as The Crime Code (US)
- The Office Secret (1927)
- The House of Evil (1927)
- Twice Tried (1928)
- The Sting (1928)
- The Rat Trap (1928)
- Concerning This Woman (1928)
- The Secret Formula (1928)
- The Amazing Count (1929)
- The Crinkled Crown (1929)
- The Golden Three (1931)

=== Collections ===
- Stolen Souls (1895) stories
- Secrets of Monte Carlo (1899)
- Secrets of the Foreign Office: Describing the Doings of Duckworth Drew of the Secret Service (1903)
- Confessions of a Ladies' Man: Being the Adventures of Cuthbert Croom, of His Majesty's Diplomatic Service (1905)
- The Count's Chauffeur (1906)
- The Lady in the Car (1908)
- The Bomb-Makers: Being Some Curios Records Concerning The Craft And Cunning of Theodore Drost, An Enemy Alien in London (1917)
- Donovan of Whitehall (1917)
- The Rainbow Mystery, Chronicles of a Colour-Criminologist Recorded by his Secretary (1917)
- The Secret Shame of the Kaiser (1919)
- The Hotel X (1919)
- Society Intrigues I Have Known; Astounding Facts Concerning Prominent People, Disclosed by Lady Betty G---- (1920)
- Mysteries of a Great City (1920)
- In Secret (1920)
- The Luck of the Secret Service; being the Startling Adventures of Claud Heathwaite, C. B., of His Britannic Majesty's foreign office (1921)
- The Elusive Four, Which Discloses the Exciting Exploits of Four Thieves (1921)
- The Gay Triangle (1922)
- Bleke, The Butler: Being the Exciting Adventures of Robert Bleke during Certain Years of His Service in Various Families (1923)
- The Crimes Club (1927)
- The Peril of Helen Marklove (1928)
- The Factotum and Other Stories (1931)

=== Non fiction ===
- A Secret Service: Being Strange Tales of a Nihilist (1892)
- The Closed Book, Concerning the Secret of the Borgias (1904)
- The Near East. The Present Situation in Montenegro, Bosnia, Servia, Bulgaria, Roumania, Turkey and Macedonia (1907) anonymous
- Treasure of Israel (1910) also as The Great God Gold (US) Issued as Daily Mail sixpenny novel 148 in 1911. With illustrations by G. H. Evison.
- The Price of Power, Being Chapters from the Secret History of the Imperial Court of Russia (1913)
- Britain's Deadly Peril (1915)
- German Atrocities: A Record of Shameless Deeds (1915)
- German Spies in England: An Exposure (1915)
- The Zeppelin Destroyer : Being Some Chapters of Secret History (1916)
- Rasputin: The Rascal Monk (1917)
- Further Secrets of Potsdam (1917)
- Hushed Up at German Headquarters (1917)
- The Minister of Evil : The Secret History of Rasputin's Betrayal of Russia (1917)
- Behind the German Lines: Amazing Confessions of Col.-Lieut. Otto Von Heynitz (1917)
- The Secrets of Potsdam By Count Ernst Von Heltzendorff (1918)
- Love Intrigues of the Kaiser's Sons (1918)
- Secrets of the White Tsar; the Truth Revealed by His Majesty's Personal Attaché, Colonel Vassili Grigorieff (1919)
- Rasputinism in London. Revelations of the secret Cult of Beauty and Happiness established by the Monk Grichtaka (1919)
- Landru: His Secret Love Affairs (1922)
- Things I Know About Kings, Celebrities, and Crooks (1923) memoirs

== Anthologies ==
- Before Armageddon: An Anthology of Victorian and Edwardian Imaginative Fiction Published Before 1914 (1975)
