= Business as usual (policy) =

Business as usual was a policy followed by the British government, under Prime Minister H. H. Asquith, during the early years of the First World War. Its fundamental belief was that in order to maintain a stable and functioning country, it was necessary to continue society in the same manner as before the war; in other words, that civilians should think of the war as "business as usual". The underlying assumption was that a morale-eroding change in behaviour equated to a victory for the enemy.

The maxim of the British people is 'Business as usual'.

— Winston Churchill, speaking at Guildhall, 9 November 1914.

The term itself is attributed to Winston Churchill, then a prominent "New Liberal".

== See also ==
- Normalcy
