= Tobermory (short story) =

1909 short story by Hector Hugh Munro

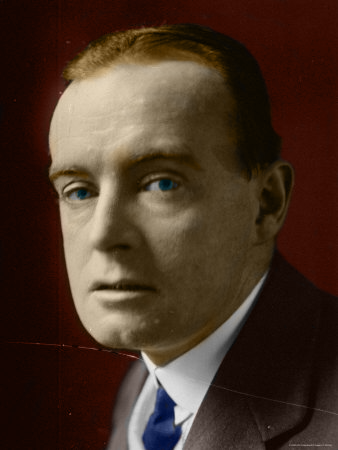
Hector Hugh Munro (Saki), photographed by E. O. Hoppé

"Tobermory" is a humorous short story by Hector Hugh Munro written under his pen-name, Saki. It was originally published in The Westminster Gazette in 1909, first collected, in a revised form, in The Chronicles of Clovis (1911), and has frequently been reprinted in anthologies.

The plot concerns Tobermory, a cat who, at a country house party, is taught by one of the guests how to talk. He converses in a tone of feline superciliousness with the hosts and guests, alarming them with his knowledge of their secrets and his indiscretion in reporting the conversations he has overheard. In Tobermory's absence they plan to poison him, but his fate is taken out of their hands when he is killed by a neighbouring cat.

"Tobermory" is one of Munro's best-known stories, and generally acknowledged to be one of his masterpieces.

== Synopsis ==
The story takes place at a house party held by Sir Wilfrid and Lady Blemley, where one of the guests, the scientist Cornelius Appin, announces that he has developed a method of teaching animals how to speak, and that he has successfully applied his technique to Lady Blemley's cat, Tobermory. Being a cat of unusual intelligence, he says, Tobermory has learned to speak with perfect correctness. Tobermory enters and the guests question him. He answers them in a supercilious and indiscreet manner, revealing many embarrassing comments he has overheard. Asked by one guest, Mavis Pellington, what she thinks of human intelligence, and hers in particular, he replies that Sir Wilfrid considers her the most brainless woman of his acquaintance. When Major Barfield raises the subject of Tobermory's carryings-on with another of the house's cats, Tobermory suggests that the Major might not enjoy having the conversation turn to his own affairs. "The panic which ensued was not confined to the Major", and it becomes general when the guests remember that Tobermory is in the habit of walking along a balustrade that runs outside the bedroom windows. One guest rhetorically asks "Why did I ever come down here?", to which Tobermory responds that she came for the food. "That woman is a regular Hunger Marcher; she'd go anywhere for four square meals a day", he reports another guest as saying.

Tobermory leaves suddenly on seeing the approach of a big yellow tomcat from a neighbouring house. In his absence they all discuss the frightening possibility of Tobermory's teaching other cats how to talk, and consider poison as a solution. One guest suggests that Appin confine his method in future to the shorthorns on the farm or the elephants at the Zoological Gardens. "An archangel ecstatically proclaiming the Millennium, and then finding that it clashed unpardonably with Henley and would have to be indefinitely postponed, could hardly have felt more crestfallen than Cornelius Appin at the reception of his wonderful achievement." The remainder of the day is spent in nervous anticipation of Tobermory's return, a plateful of poisoned fish scraps having been prepared for him, but he makes no appearance. The following day his savaged corpse is discovered along with some tell-tale fur from the big yellow tom. The party breaks up, and a few weeks later it is reported in the newspapers that an Englishman called Appin or Eppelin has been killed by an elephant at Dresden Zoological Gardens. One of the characters, Clovis Sangrail, comments that "If he was trying German irregular verbs on the poor beast he deserved all he got."

== Publication history ==
There are two versions of "Tobermory". The first was originally published in the 27 November 1909 issue of The Westminster Gazette, and eventually reprinted in Peter Haining's Saki Short Stories 2 (London: Dent, 1983). The second, and better known, version dates from 1911 when Munro edited the story for inclusion in his new collection, The Chronicles of Clovis. In the interests of giving the book continuity he introduced its title-character, Clovis Sangrail, into "Tobermory" as one of the house-guests. The Chronicles of Clovis was widely seen by Munro's contemporaries as his best and most characteristic work, and "Tobermory" came in for its share of praise. The Saturday Review thought it "worthy of F. Anstey", and S. P. B. Mais wrote that "For originality of theme it would be hard to beat". It has since been anthologized many times, and translations have appeared in French, Dutch and Danish.

== Analogues and themes ==
Cats who have been taught speech or other forms of communication have been a not uncommon trope in fantasy and science fiction stories. One figures in Kurd Lasswitz's "Psychotomy" (1893), and they were to recur after Munro's time in Clare Winger Harris's "The Evolutionary Monstrosity" (1929), Harl Vincent's "Prowler of the Wastelands" (1935), Carl Peregoy's "Shortwave Experiment" (1935), and Fritz Leiber's "Space-Time for Springers" (1958). Munro's use of such a character in a beast fable to obliquely criticise social conventions puts "Tobermory" in a tradition that goes back to Aesop, Statius, and Horace. In this fable the talking cat can be seen as representing human nature untrammelled by bourgeois good manners, hypocritical pretence of concern for others, and conventional respectability. His disruption of the party shows up the artificiality and fragility of the social order.
