= Spine Chillers =

Television series

Spine Chillers is the name of two separate supernatural television series, broadcast on the BBC.

== 1980s series ==
Spine Chillers is a 1980 British children's supernatural television series produced by the Jackanory team and broadcast on BBC1. It featured readings of classic ghost and horror stories aimed at older children, and ran for 20 episodes of 10 minutes each.

=== Episodes and air dates ===
1. "The Red Room" by H. G. Wells, told by Freddie Jones (17 November 1980)
2. "The Yellow Cat" by Michael Joseph, told by John Woodvine (18 November 1980)
3. "The Music on the Hill" by Saki, told by Jonathan Pryce (20 November 1980)
4. "The Mezzotint" by M. R. James, told by Michael Bryant (21 November 1980)
5. "The Treasure in the Forest" by H. G. Wells, told by Freddie Jones (24 November 1980)
6. "The Devil's Ape" by Barnard Stacey, told by John Woodvine (25 November 1980)
7. "Sredni Vashtar" by Saki, told by Jonathan Pryce (27 November 1980)
8. "A School Story" by M. R. James, told by Michael Bryant (28 November 1980)
9. "In the Avu Observatory" by H. G. Wells, told by Freddie Jones (1 December 1980)
10. "The Running Companion" by Philippa Pearce, told by John Woodvine (2 December 1980)
11. "The Penance" by Saki, told by Jonathan Pryce (4 December 1980)
12. "The Well" by W. W. Jacobs, told by Michael Bryant (5 December 1980)
13. "The Stolen Bacillus" by H. G. Wells, told by Freddie Jones (8 December 1980)
14. "A Sin of Omission" by Ronald Chetwynd-Hayes, told by John Woodvine (9 December 1980)
15. "Gabriel-Ernest" by Saki, told by Jonathan Pryce (11 December 1980)
16. "The Diary of Mr Poynter" by M. R. James, told by Michael Bryant (12 December 1980)
17. "The Flowering of the Strange Orchid" by H. G. Wells, told by Freddie Jones (15 December 1980)
18. "More Spinned Against" by John Wyndham, told by John Woodvine (16 December 1980)
19. "The Hounds of Fate" by Saki, told by Jonathan Pryce (18 December 1980)
20. "Jerry Bundler" by W. W. Jacobs, told by Michael Bryant (19 December 1980)

== 2003 series ==
Spine Chillers is also the name of a British series aimed at older viewers, a comedy horror anthology first shown on BBC Three in 2003. It comprised six episodes:

1. "Bradford In My Dreams"
2. "Goths"
3. "Fairy Godfather"
4. "Intuition"
5. "Lose Weight... Ask Me How"
6. "Love Gods"

In 2005, a similar fourteen-part anthology series Twisted Tales premiered on the same channel.

The streaming version of Spine Chillers available on Prime Video and Tubi combines the 2003 show as season one and the first eight episodes of Twisted Tales as the second season.
