= The Supernatural Reader =

1953 anthology edited by Groff and Lucy Conklin

- Cover of first edition.
- Editors: Groff and Lucy Conklin
- Cover artist: Robert Hallock
- Language: English
- Genre: Horror
- Publisher: J. B. Lippincott
- Publication date: 1953
- Publication place: United States
- Media type: Print (hardcover)
- Pages: 349

The Supernatural Reader is an anthology of horror short stories edited by Groff and Lucy Conklin. It was first published in hardcover by American company J. B. Lippincott in April 1953, with a Canadian edition issued the same year by Longmans. The first British edition was issued by Cassell & Company in 1957. Paperback editions were published in Britain by World/WDL Books in 1958 and in the United States by Collier Books in 1962. The Collier edition was issued as edited by Groff Conklin alone and was reprinted several times, in 1966, 1967, 1968, and 1970.

The book collects twenty-seven novelettes and short stories by various authors, together with an introduction by the editor. The stories were previously published from 1858-1952 in various magazines.

== Contents ==
- "Introduction" (Groff Conklin)
- "The Angel With Purple Hair" (Herb Paul)
- "For the Blood Is the Life" (F. Marion Crawford)
- "The Stranger" (Richard Hughes)
- "Mrs. Manifold" (Stephen Grendon)
- "Piffingcap" (A. E. Coppard)
- "Shottle Bop" (Theodore Sturgeon)
- "Gabriel-Ernest" (H. H. Munro)
- "The Lost Room" (Fitz-James O'Brien)
- "The Traitor" (James S. Hart)
- "Angus MacAuliffe and the Gowden Tooch" (Charles R. Tanner)
- "Are You Run-Down, Tired—" (Babette Rosmond and Leonard M. Lake)
- "The Nature of the Evidence" (May Sinclair)
- "The Tree's Wife" (Mary Elizabeth Counselman)
- "The Pavilion" (E. Nesbit)
- "Pick-Up for Olympus" (Edgar Pangborn)
- "The Swap" (H. F. Heard)
- "The Tombling Day" (Ray Bradbury)
- "Minuke" (Nigel Kneale)
- "Bird of Prey" (John Collier)
- "The Thing in the Cellar" (David H. Keller)
- "Devil's Henchman" (Will Jenkins)
- "Lost Hearts" (M. R. James)
- "Thirteen at Table" (Lord Dunsany)
- "Lights" (Philip Fisher)
- "The Silver Highway" (Harold Lawlor)
- "The Moonlit Road" (Ambrose Bierce)
- "The Curate's Friend" (E. M. Forster)
