= The Unbearable Bassington =

Novel of 1912 by Saki

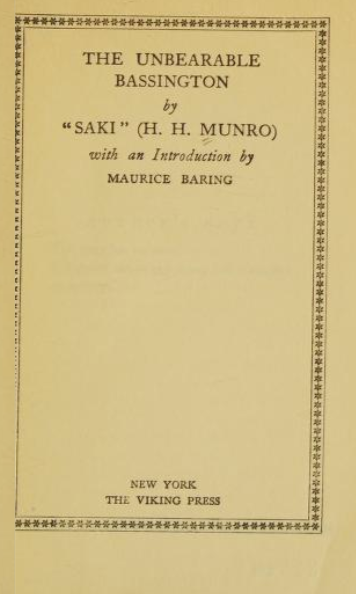
- Title page for The Unbearable Bassington (1926 edition)
- Author: Saki
- Published: 1912
- Publisher: John Lane
- Preceded by: The Chronicles of Clovis (1911)
- Followed by: When William Came (1913)

The Unbearable Bassington is a novel by the British author Saki (the pseudonym of Hector Hugh Munro) published in 1912.

== Plot ==
Set mainly in London, with a section in Paris, the novel focuses on the Mayfair social scene of bridge, dinner parties, concerts, and the sporting events of the season.

At the beginning of the book, the anti-hero, Comus Bassington, a "beautiful wayward laughing boy", the spoilt only child of Francesca Bassington, a fashionable widow who for the while lives in an expensive home, is in his last year at school, where he is a sadistic prefect. After he ends his school career, he lives with his mother and joins a group of bores and savage society wits.

Without a career or a fortune of his own, Bassington hopes to marry Elaine de Frey, a rich young heiress, facing competition from his friend Courtenay Youghal, a rising politician. Of the two, Elaine prefers Comus, but she is put off by his habit of borrowing money from her and his carelessness towards her. When her engagement to Youghal is announced, Francesca is angry with her son, blaming him for losing his one chance of financial security. On the advice of his uncle Henry Greech, he is sent away to take up a job in West Africa, where he soon dies.

== Reception ==
The novel was seen as a success and was one of the works recommended to readers by Frank Swinnerton in his revision of Arnold Bennett's Literary Taste: How to Form It (1937).
