= England Invaded =

Anthology of fantasy fiction

First edition (publ. W. H. Allen & Co.). Cover art by Rodney Matthews.

England Invaded is an anthology of imaginative fiction, including invasion literature, from the Victorian and Edwardian periods, edited by British author Michael Moorcock. Originally published in hardback by W. H. Allen in 1977, it was re-issued as a paperback by Star in 1980.

Note—the same title was used for a book by Edward Foord and Gordon Home, published in 1913, describing the historic invasions of England.

== Contents ==
- "Introduction" by Michael Moorcock
- "The Uses of Advertisement – an Aeroplane Adventure" by Tristram Crutchley (from Pearson's Magazine, July 1909)
- "When the New Zealander Comes" by Blyde Muddersnook (from The Strand Magazine, September 1911)
- "The Monster of Lake LaMetrie" by Wardon Allan Curtis (from Pearsons Magazine, September 1899)
- "The Abduction of Alexandra Seine" by Fred C. Smale (from The Harmsworth Magazine, November 1900)
- "Is the End of the World Near?" by John Munro (Cassell’s, Jan. 1899)
- When William Came by Saki

== See also ==
- Before Armageddon, a similar earlier collection edited by Moorcock
