= John Segrue =

English journalist

- Born: John Chrysostom Segrue; 17 January 1884; Liverpool, Lancashire, England
- Died: 11 September 1942 (aged 58); Stalag VIII-B, Lamsdorf, Germany
- Occupation: Journalist
- Writing career
- Pen name: J. C. Segrue

John Chrysostom Segrue (17 January 1884 - 11 September 1942), also reporting under his initials as J. C. Segrue, was an English journalist. He worked as foreign correspondent for the News Chronicle and its predecessor, The Daily News, for almost 30 years, reporting on current events throughout continental Europe. Expelled from Berlin and Vienna for his critical reporting of the Nazis and his condemnation of their persecution of the Jews, Segrue was named in the Sonderfahndungsliste G.B., commonly referred to as ‘The Black Book,’ a list of people whom the SS had marked down for immediate arrest in the event of the Germans’ successfully completing the invasion of Britain. He was captured in 1941, whilst escaping from Belgrade during the German invasion of Yugoslavia, and interned in a German prisoner-of-war camp, where he died as a result of tuberculosis in 1942. He was later honoured by the Guild of Jewish Journalists for "alerting the world, through his dispatches, to the true evil of Nazi philosophy."

== Early life ==
Segrue was born on 17 January 1884 in Liverpool, Lancashire, to Irish parents, John Timothy Segrue and Susan Segrue (née Grannell). His father, who was born in County Kerry, was a financial publicity consultant, director of the City News Agency and former journalist who was, for many years, associated with T. P. O'Connor in his newspaper enterprises. Segrue was educated at the independent St. Edmund’s College in Ware, Hertfordshire.

== Early career ==
After a stint as sub-editor on The Universe, - Segrue’s father had, at one point, run the Catholic Weekly, which was later incorporated into The Universe – Segrue joined the Manchester Courier in 1907, working as a reporter under Nicol Dunn.

In 1910, prior to the outbreak of World War I, Segrue relocated to the Daily News, proving himself as an extremely competent journalist and working his way up the ranks to become one of the paper’s principal war correspondents. He became proficient in French and German and, later, in response to his broadening journalistic horizons, Italian and Russian. He would later use his German knowledge to provide the English translation of Kurt Schuschnigg’s book, Farewell Austria.

He represented the paper from bases in Vienna, Berlin and Paris, finding himself in Switzerland at the time of the Armistice. Travelling into Bavaria before continuing onward to Berlin, he was the first British correspondent to enter Germany after the cessation of hostilities in late 1918. He had sharply denounced the Allies' Blockade of Germany, labelling it a tragedy, which had resulted in the starvation of children. He also managed to secure an interview with Karl Kautsky, who had been commissioned to find documents that proved the war guilt of Imperial Germany.

From 1918 into the 1920s, Segrue continued to report on current events in an ever-changing and politically unstable Europe, spending several years as the Daily News’ Berlin correspondent. During the Kapp Putsch in March 1920, he was among the first journalists to meet military dictator Wolfgang Kapp and fearlessly pepper him with questions so much that a German colleague was reminded of a "true cross-examination" like in a court of law.

He also expanded his coverage into Russia, which was, by that time, undergoing a radical transformation into a socialist state. A 1920 request for comment from Segrue to Vladimir Lenin, on the matter of certain socialists, who had visited Soviet Russia, publishing anti-Soviet articles, elicited a prompt response from the Russian head of government himself, which, along with Segrue’s original telegraphic inquiry, was published in Pravda, the official publication of the Communist Party. Segrue, who was noted as one of the first reporters to enter Communist Russia, would become well acquainted with the country, undertaking a tour in autumn 1921, during which time he interviewed Russian writer and political activist Maxim Gorky. His coverage of Premier Lenin’s funeral, on 27 January 1924, was the only first-hand account to be published in London on the day following the event. His article received critical acclaim and was regarded as one of the best examples of reporting in British newspapers that year.

== Berlin ==
After spending several years in Paris during the late 1920s, whilst also travelling further afield to Italy and Romania, Segrue returned to Berlin in the early 1930s. In June 1930, Segrue’s paper, The Daily News, had merged with the Daily Chronicle to create the News Chronicle, for whom he continued to report as Berlin correspondent. From his base in the German capital, Segrue began to witness seismic shifts in the political landscape, which he found deeply disturbing. A devout Roman Catholic and passionate liberal, Segrue was becoming increasingly uneasy about the rise of fascism throughout continental Europe, a concern he shared with those closest to him. Despite this, Segrue still held out some hope that the Germans would never propel Adolf Hitler to power. Segrue’s journalistic credentials allowed him to gain intimate access to the future German chancellor and he, along with fellow journalists, including Segrue’s friend Rothay Reynolds, accompanied Hitler on his 1932 electoral campaign tour. The election of 1933 confirmed Segrue’s worst fears, but he continued to report on Germany’s new leader with the honesty for which he was well known - whilst displaying consideration for diplomatic relations - hoping that Hitler’s successful acquisition of the most powerful office in the country would be short-lived.

Into the 1930s, Segrue continued his work as Berlin correspondent, reporting on such current events as the Reichstag Fire Decree of 28 February 1933 (after which he labelled the German government a ‘dictatorship’), Hitler’s actions against the trade unions and the Röhm purge of 30 June to 2 July 1934. During this period, a series of anti-Jewish laws were being passed against the local Jewish population, clamping down on their civil, political and legal rights. Segrue produced several scathing reports on the treatment of Jewish people within Germany, whilst also financially assisting his Jewish friends, who had been stripped of their livelihoods, and making a point of taking on a Jewish girl as secretary, when she would have otherwise been unable to get work.

Segrue’s critical reports from his time in Berlin, which included a 1933 report on the Nazi persecution of the German Jews having catastrophic economic repercussions and a 1935 article in which Segrue reported with optimism that the Nazi regime was being threatened by an increasing German unrest, were in direct conflict with the ruling party’s insistence that journalists only report in a pro-Nazi direction and led to his being expelled from Germany and resettled, by the News Chronicle, in Vienna in 1936.

== Vienna and the Incident in Leopoldstadt ==
Undeterred, Segrue resumed his work as special correspondent from the Austrian capital, but his relative safety in Vienna was short-lived. The annexation of Austria on 13 March 1938 led to Segrue’s once again incurring the wrath of the Nazi party. In his book, ‘First with the Truth: Newspapermen in Action,’ Egon Larsen recounts the story of the time S.S. officials stormed into Segrue’s room and compelled him to compose a pro-Hitler message to send to the News Chronicle, insisting that it be in German (so they could understand exactly what he was writing), whilst threatening him with their weapons. However, they could not force the newspaper to publish Segrue’s coerced message.

The new administration also placed significant pressure upon the British legation in Vienna to intervene, in an attempt to prevent Segrue from publishing more of his highly critical articles. The British official, who was tasked with relaying the message from the Viennese diplomatic office to Segrue, pleaded with him to “tone down his approach because it was embarrassing in 'a delicate situation.'” Segrue refused categorically, ensuring he was within earshot of his son, Tim, who was visiting from boarding school in England. When Segrue’s son, Brian, visited his father, Segrue requested that he accompany an elderly Jewish journalist, Ernst Klein, to the train taking him out of Austria, instructing Brian to speak very loudly in English to Klein in an effort to provide him with some form of protection.

In the spring of 1938, Segrue had the interaction by which he would come to be defined. According to an account provided by an Austrian journalist who witnessed the incident, Segrue had ventured into Leopoldstadt, a Jewish district of Vienna, where he came across S.S. men forcing a large group of Jewish men and women, of all ages, to wash cars. Whilst doing so, the Jews were subjected to vile taunts and acts of physical violence, to the delight of the unruly mob of spectators. An S.S. officer spotted Segrue, who had been observing the incident, and assumed that he must be a Jew, as he had not joined the crowd in celebrating the public humiliation. The officer collared Segrue, thrust a dirty rag into his hands and shouted “There, you damned Jew, get to work and help your fellow swine.” Initially, Segrue complied and helped an exhausted elderly woman to complete her task, before handing back the rag to the S.S. officer. He then presented his passport and declared: “I am not a Jew, but a subject of His Majesty, the King of England.” Turning towards the S.S. commander, he stated: “I could scarcely believe that the stories about your brutality were true. I wanted to see for myself. I have seen. Good day.” Segrue, having confirmed the veracity of rumours circulating about the Nazi regime’s barbarous treatment of the Jews in Vienna, then left the scene, leaving the crowd "awed by the temerity of the frail little Englishman who, before their eyes, had made fools of the terrible S.S." He was once again expelled by the Nazis.

== Internment and death ==
At the outbreak of World War II, Segrue was in the Balkans. During the early stages of the war, he reported for the News Chronicle from Budapest, whilst also travelling extensively within the regions of continental Europe still open to him. In the spring of 1941, Segrue was in Belgrade, reporting on the German invasion of Yugoslavia. He was present during Operation Retribution, the April 1941 German bombing of Belgrade, where David Walker of the Daily Mirror saw him calmly writing his dispatch by a blown-out hotel window. Foreign correspondents stationed in Belgrade received urgent messages from their employers, instructing them to flee whilst they still could. Segrue’s paper, the News Chronicle, was greatly concerned about his safety, as he had become a prominent enemy of the Reich. As a result of his open defiance and fierce criticism of the Nazis, he had been added to the Sonderfahndungsliste G.B., commonly referred to as ‘The Black Book,’ a list of people whom the SS had marked down for immediate arrest in the event of the Germans’ successfully completing the invasion of Britain. He was listed twice: once by his journalistic nom de plume ‘J.C. Segrue’ and once by the name "Chrisoton [sic], John Segrue." (Note: Due to a typing error, Segrue was listed by his middle name.) He was being hunted by Referat IV B4, a sub-department of the "Suppression of Opposition" office Amt IV.

In Belgrade, Segrue was informed that the final escape transport was departing the city, but he refused to leave, insisting that he finish his story first, to the disbelief of the messenger. He instead planned to travel to Budapest in order to reunite with his wife, Eveline. He made his way to Sarajevo, after managing to catch the last train from Belgrade, then attempted to join a British convoy, but he was told that there was no place available for him. He decided to continue his journey to Budapest, travelling via Zagreb, then the capital of Independent State of Croatia, but was captured there by the Germans on his arrival. He was then sent to a German prisoner-of-war camp.

At the time of his imprisonment, Segrue was already nearing 60 and not physically robust. He was interned in Stalag XIII-A, Lower Silesia, where he developed tuberculosis. British doctors endeavoured to save him, and had him transferred to a hospital with better facilities, but his condition was fatal. On 11 September 1942, aged 58, he died in the hospital of Stalag XIII-B, Lamsdorf, Germany. His death was reported in several newspapers of the time, including The New York Times. He was buried in Rakowicki Cemetery in Kraków, Poland.

== Legacy ==
The account of the incident in Leopoldstadt was recorded on a plaque, located in the editorial department of the News Chronicle, which commemorated Segrue's years of dedicated service. The plaque would later be handed over to his son, Brian, when the paper ceased publication in 1960.

In 1981, Segrue was posthumously given an award by the Guild of Jewish Journalists. Joe Grizzard, chairman of the Guild, stated that the award was in recognition of "his courage and selflessness in rescuing Jewish lives and alerting the world, through his dispatches, to the true evil of Nazi philosophy.” In his honour, the Guild planted fifty trees in Israel.

== Personal life ==
Segrue was married to Eveline Baker, a hospital nurse, with whom he had 2 sons, who also entered the journalistic profession. His son Brian (d.1989) was a senior Sunday Mirror journalist. Brian's daughter, Sarah, worked for The Times.
