= Literary Taste: How to Form It =

Essay by Arnold Bennett

Literary Taste: How to Form it: With Detailed Instructions for Collecting a Complete Library of English Literature is a long essay by Arnold Bennett, first published in 1909, with a revised edition by his friend Frank Swinnerton appearing in 1937. (Note: Swinnerton's revised edition may be considered a "second edition", but many printings of Literary Taste that do not have any connection to Swinnerton list independent second editions, third editions, and even ninth editions.) It includes a long list of recommended books, every item individually costed.

Both the essay and the list were very influential, although Bennett's decision to include only books originally written in English (along with a handful of Latin works) makes it extremely insular compared with most other attempts at compiling a literary canon.

== Outline ==
Preface (unnumbered) (only found in Swinnerton edition)

1. The Aim
2. Your Particular Case
3. Why a Classic is a Classic
4. Where to Begin
5. How to Read a Classic (using Charles Lamb's Dream Children)
6. The Question of Style
7. Wrestling with an Author
8. System in Reading
9. Verse (Hazlitt's On Poetry in General, Isaiah ch. 40, Wordsworth's The Brothers, E. Browning's Aurora Leigh)
10. Broad Counsels
11. An English Library: Period I
12. An English Library: Period II
13. An English Library: Period III
14. An English Library: Period IV (possibly with appendix) (only found in Swinnerton edition)
15. Mental Stocktaking

== Library ==
Period IV only appears in the edition by Swinnerton.

The symbol * denotes things excluded from Swinnerton's edition. The symbol † denotes items available in Swinnerton's edition only.

=== Period I (to 1700) ===
==== Prose ====
- Venerable Bede: Ecclesiastical History (Latin)
- The Paston Letters†
- Hugh Latimer: Sermons†
- Sir Thomas Malory: Morte d'Arthur
- Sir Thomas More: Utopia (Latin)
- George Cavendish: Life of Cardinal Wolsey
- Richard Hakluyt: Voyages
- Richard Hooker: Ecclesiastical Polity
- Francis Bacon: Essays and Advancement of Learning
- Thomas Dekker (poet): The Gul's Horn-Book
- Lord Herbert of Cherbury: Autobiography*
- Thomas Lodge: Rosalynde
- John Selden: Table Talk
- Thomas Hobbes: Leviathan
- James Howell: Familiar Letters
- Sir Thomas Browne: Religio Medici, Urn Burial
- Jeremy Taylor: Holy Living and Holy Dying
- Izaak Walton: The Compleat Angler
- John Bunyan: The Pilgrim's Progress
- Sir William Temple: Essay on Gardens of Epicurus*
- Dorothy Osborne: Letters to Sir William Temple†
- John Evelyn: Diary
- Samuel Pepys: Diary

==== Poetry ====
- Beowulf
- Everyman and other Interludes†
- William Langland: Piers Plowman†
- Geoffrey Chaucer
- Nicolas Udall: Ralph Roister Doister
- Edmund Spenser
- Thomas Kyd: The Spanish Tragedy†
- Robert Greene: The Tragical Reign of Selimus
- Michael Drayton
- Christopher Marlowe
- William Shakespeare
- Thomas Campion
- Ben Jonson: plays
- John Donne: poems and sermons
- John Webster, Cyril Tourneur* and John Ford: plays
- Philip Massinger: plays
- Beaumont and Fletcher: plays
- George Herbert: "The Temple"
- Robert Herrick
- Edmund Waller
- Sir John Suckling
- Abraham Cowley*
- Richard Crashaw
- Henry Vaughan
- Samuel Butler: Hudibras
- John Milton: Areopagitica, other essays, and poems
- Andrew Marvell
- John Dryden: Essay of Dramatick Poesie†, and poems
- Thomas Percy: Reliques of Ancient English Poetry (ed.)
- Arber's Anthologies*
- John Marston, plays* (omitted from list because out of print)

=== Period II (1700-1800) ===
==== Prose ====
- John Locke: Two Treatises of Government
- Sir Isaac Newton: Principia*
- Gilbert Burnet: History of His Own Time
- William Wycherley: plays
- William Congreve
- Jonathan Swift: Gulliver's Travels, The Tale of a Tub; The Battle of the Books†
- Daniel Defoe: Robinson Crusoe, A Journal of the Plague Year
- Joseph Addison and Sir Richard Steele: The Spectator
- William Law: A Serious Call to a Devout and Holy Life
- Colley Cibber: Autobiography†
- Lady Mary Wortley Montagu: Letters
- George Berkeley: A Treatise Concerning the Principles of Human Knowledge
- Samuel Richardson: Clarissa
- John Wesley: Journal
- Henry Fielding: Tom Jones, Amelia, Joseph Andrews
- David Hume: essays
- Laurence Sterne: Tristram Shandy, A Sentimental Journey Through France and Italy
- Horace Walpole: The Castle of Otranto; Letters†
- William Thomas Beckford: Vathek†
- Samuel Johnson: Rasselas, Lives of the Poets
- Tobias Smollett: Humphrey Clinker, Travels through France and Italy
- Adam Smith: The Wealth of Nations
- James Boswell: Life of Johnson
- Oliver Goldsmith
- Henry Mackenzie: The Man of Feeling
- Sir Joshua Reynolds: Discourses on Art
- Edmund Burke: Writings on France, Thoughts on the Present Discontents
- Edward Gibbon: The Decline and Fall of the Roman Empire; Autobiography†
- Thomas Paine: The Rights of Man
- Richard Brinsley Sheridan: plays
- Fanny Burney: Evelina
- Gilbert White: The Natural History and Antiquities of Selborne
- Arthur Young: Travels in France
- Mungo Park: Travels
- Jeremy Bentham: Introduction to the Principles of Morals*
- Thomas Robert Malthus: An Essay on the Principle of Population
- William Godwin: Caleb Williams*
- Maria Edgeworth: Helen
- Jane Austen
- James Morier: Hadji Baba*

==== Poetry ====
- Thomas Otway: Venice Preserved
- Matthew Prior: Poems on Several Occasions
- John Gay
- Alexander Pope
- Isaac Watts: hymns
- James Thomson
- Charles Wesley: hymns
- Samuel Johnson
- Oliver Goldsmith
- Thomas Gray
- William Collins
- James Macpherson: Ossian*
- Thomas Chatterton
- William Cowper
- George Crabbe
- William Blake
- William Lisle Bowles*
- Hartley Coleridge*
- Robert Burns

=== Period III (1800-1900) ===
==== Novelists ====
- Sir Walter Scott: Waverley, The Heart of Midlothian, Quentin Durward, Redgauntlet, Ivanhoe, The Pirate†, The Antiquary†
- Thomas Love Peacock
- Mary Russell Mitford: Our Village
- Michael Scott: Tom Cringle's Log
- Frederick Marryat: The King's Own†, Mr Midshipman Easy
- John Galt: Annals of the Parish, The Ayrshire Legatees
- Susan Ferrier: Marriage
- Douglas William Jerrold: Mrs Caudle's Curtain Lectures*
- Edward Bulwer-Lytton: The Last Days of Pompeii
- Charles Lever: Harry Lorrequer
- Harrison Ainsworth: Rookwood†, The Tower of London
- George Borrow: Lavengro, The Romany Rye†, The Bible in Spain
- Benjamin Disraeli: Sybil, Coningsby
- William Makepeace Thackeray: Vanity Fair, The History of Henry Esmond, The Memoirs of Barry Lyndon, Esq.*, Roundabout Papers*
- Charles Dickens
- Charles Reade: The Cloister and the Hearth
- Anthony Trollope: The Warden†, Barchester Towers, Framley Parsonage, The Last Chronicle of Barset†, Autobiography†
- Charles Kingsley: Westward Ho!
- Henry Kingsley: Ravenshoe
- Charlotte Brontë, Emily Brontë; Anne Brontë†
- Elizabeth Gaskell: Cranford, Mary Barton†, North and South†, The Life of Charlotte Bronte
- George Eliot: Adam Bede, Silas Marner, The Mill on the Floss, Middlemarch†
- George Whyte-Melville: The Gladiators
- George Macdonald: Malcolm*, Sir Gibbie†
- Wilkie Collins: The Woman in White, The Moonstone†
- R. D. Blackmore: Lorna Doone
- Samuel Butler: Erewhon, The Way of All Flesh†, Notebooks†
- Laurence Oliphant: Altiora Peto*
- Margaret Oliphant: Salem Chapel
- Lewis Carroll: Alice's Adventures in Wonderland, Through the Looking-Glass†
- Joseph Henry Shorthouse: John Inglesant
- Robert Louis Stevenson: Kidnapped (novel)†, The Master of Ballantrae, The Merry Men and Other Tales and Fables†, Virginibus Puerisque
- George Gissing: The Odd Women*, Thyrza†, The Private Papers of Henry Ryecroft†

==== Non-novelists ====
- Charles Lamb
- Walter Savage Landor: Imaginary Conversations, poems
- Leigh Hunt: Autobiography†, Essays and Sketches
- William Cobbett
- William Hazlitt: Spirit of the Age*, The English Poets, The English Comic Writers, Table Talk†, The Plain Speaker†
- Francis Jeffrey: Essays from The Edinburgh Review
- Thomas de Quincey
- Sydney Smith: Selected Papers*
- George Finlay: Byzantine Empire*
- John G. Lockhart: Life of Scott*
- Agnes Strickland: Life of Queen Elizabeth*
- Hugh Miller: Old Red Sandstone*
- John Henry Newman: Apologia Pro Vita Sua
- Lord Macaulay: History of England, Essays
- A. P. Stanley: Memorials of Canterbury*
- Thomas Carlyle: The French Revolution: A History, Cromwell, Sartor Resartus, Heroes and Hero-Worship, Latter-Day Pamphlets*
- Charles Darwin: The Origin of Species, The Voyage of the Beagle
- Alexander William Kinglake: Eothen
- John Stuart Mill: Auguste Comte and Positivism*; Autobiography†, On Liberty†, Representative Government†
- John Brown: Horae Subsecivae, Rab and his Friends*
- Sir Arthur Helps: Friends in Council*
- Mark Pattison: Life of Milton*
- F. W. Robertson: On Religion and Life*
- Benjamin Jowett: Interpretation of Scripture*
- Alexander Smith: Dreamthorpe
- Mary Wollstonecraft: A Vindication of the Rights of Women
- George Henry Lewes: Principles of Success in Literature*, Life of Goethe†
- Alexander Bain: Mind and Body
- James Anthony Froude: Short Studies on Great Subjects
- John Tyndall: Glaciers of the Alps
- Sir Henry Maine: Ancient Law
- John Ruskin: Seven Lamps of Architecture, Sesame and Lilies, The Stones of Venice
- Herbert Spencer: First Principles, Essays on Education
- Sir Richard Francis Burton: Narrative of a Pilgrimage to Mecca*, First Footsteps in East Africa†
- John Hanning Speke: Sources of the Nile
- Thomas Henry Huxley: Man's Place in Nature, Lectures and Lay Sermons
- E. A. Freeman: Europe*
- William Stubbs: Early Plantagenets*
- Winwood Reade: The Martyrdom of Man†
- Walter Bagehot: Lombard Street*, Literary Studies†
- Walter Pater: Imaginary Portraits, Marius the Epicurean
- Richard Holt Hutton: Cardinal Newman*
- Richard Jefferies: The Story of My Heart†
- Sir John Seeley: Ecce Homo
- David Masson: Thomas de Quincey*
- Sir George Trevelyan, 2nd Baronet: Life of Macaulay†
- John Richard Green: A Short History of the English People
- Sir Leslie Stephen: Pope*
- Lord Acton: On the Study of History*
- Mandell Creighton: The Age of Elizabeth*
- Oscar Wilde†
- F. W. H. Myers: Wordsworth*, Human Personality and its Survival of Bodily Death†
- Mark Rutherford: Pages from a Journal†

==== Poets ====
- William Wordsworth
- Sir Walter Scott
- Robert Southey
- Samuel Taylor Coleridge
- John Keats
- Percy Bysshe Shelley
- Lord Byron
- Thomas Hood
- James and Horace Smith: Rejected Addresses
- John Keble: The Christian Year
- George Darley
- Thomas Lovell Beddoes
- Thomas Moore
- James Clarence Mangan
- Winthrop Mackworth Praed
- Robert Stephen Hawker: Cornish Ballads
- Edward FitzGerald: Rubaiyat of Omar Khayyam
- P. J. Bailey: Festus*
- Arthur Hugh Clough
- Lord Tennyson
- Robert Browning and Elizabeth Barrett Browning
- P. B. Marston: Song-tide*
- Aubrey Thomas de Vere: Legends of St Patrick*
- Matthew Arnold: poems and essays
- Coventry Patmore
- Sydney Dobell*
- Eric Mackay: Love-letters of a Violinist*
- T. E. Brown
- C. S. Calverley: Verses, Translations and Fly-Leaves
- Edward Lear: A Book of Nonsense†
- D. G. Rossetti
- Christina Rossetti: "Goblin Market"
- James Thomson: "The City of Dreadful Night"
- Jean Ingelow
- William Morris
- Augusta Webster*
- Gerard Manley Hopkins†
- W. E. Henley
- Francis Thompson

=== Period IV (1900-1935)† ===
==== Novelists and dramatists ====
- George Meredith: The Ordeal of Richard Feverel, The Egoist, Evan Harrington, An Essay on Comedy, poems
- Thomas Hardy: The Dynasts, Far from the Madding Crowd, Jude the Obscure, The Return of the Native, Tess of the D'Urbervilles, poems
- Rudyard Kipling: The Jungle Book, Just So Stories, Plain Tales from the Hills, Many Inventions, The Day's Work, Soldiers Three, Barrack-Room Ballads
- Henry James: Daisy Miller, The Spoils of Poynton, The Ambassadors
- George Moore: Confessions of a Young Man, Esther Waters, The Brook Kerith
- George Bernard Shaw: Plays Pleasant, Plays Unpleasant, Man and Superman, Saint Joan, The Apple Cart
- Joseph Conrad: The Mirror of the Sea, Lord Jim, Youth
- J. M. Barrie: The Admirable Crichton, Dear Brutus, Margaret Ogilvy, A Widow in Thrums
- Allan Monkhouse: Mary Broome
- Arthur Conan Doyle: The Adventures of Sherlock Holmes
- W. W. Jacobs: Many Cargoes
- H. G. Wells: The Time Machine, The Wheels of Chance, Short Stories, Tono-Bungay, The History of Mr Polly
- Arnold Bennett: The Old Wives' Tale, Lord Raingo, Books and Persons, The Truth about an Author
- John Galsworthy: The Forsyte Saga, plays
- Somerset Maugham: Of Human Bondage, Ashenden, The Gentleman in the Parlour, plays (The Circle, The Constant Wife, The Bread-Winner)
- Elizabeth von Arnim: Vera
- Kenneth Grahame: The Wind in the Willows
- Saki: The Unbearable Bassington
- J. M. Synge: The Playboy of the Western World
- Harley Granville-Barker: Waste, The Voysey Inheritance
- Stanley Houghton: Hindle Wakes
- St. John Greer Ervine: The Wayward Man, John Ferguson
- A. A. Milne: Second Plays, The Day's Play
- P. G. Wodehouse: The Inimitable Jeeves, Meet Mr Mulliner
- Oliver Onions: In Accordance with the Evidence
- J. D. Beresford: The Hampdenshire Wonder
- Henry Handel Richardson: Maurice Guest
- E. M. Forster: Howards End
- Compton Mackenzie: Carnival
- Hugh Walpole: The Dark Forest
- Francis Brett Young: Portrait of Clare
- D. H. Lawrence: Sons and Lovers, The Rainbow, Tales, Fantasia of the Unconscious, poems
- Katherine Mansfield: The Garden Party
- Wyndham Lewis: Tarr
- Virginia Woolf: Mrs Dalloway, The Common Reader
- Naomi Mitchison: The Conquered
- R. H. Mottram: The Spanish Farm
- J. B. Priestley: Angel Pavement, plays
- Stella Benson: The Little World
- Charles Langbridge Morgan: Portrait in a Mirror
- Aldous Huxley: Little Mexican, Brave New World, Jesting Pilate, stories, essays, poems
- David Garnett: Lady into Fox, A Man in the Zoo
- Henry Williamson: Tarka the Otter
- L. A. G. Strong: Tuesday Afternoons
- Evelyn Waugh: Decline and Fall
- Denis Johnston: The Moon in the Yellow River
- Seán O'Casey: Five Irish Plays
- Norah Hoult: Poor Women
- H. E. Bates: Thirty Tales

==== Other prose ====
- C. M. Doughty: Travels in Arabia Deserta
- W. H. Hudson: El Ombú, Birds and Men
- Morley Roberts: The Western Avernus
- Norman Douglas: South Wind, Old Calabria
- R. B. Cunninghame Graham: Rodeo, Mogreb el-Acksa
- Apsley Cherry-Garrard: The Worst Journey in the World
- David Bone: The Brassbounder
- H. M. Tomlinson: The Sea and the Jungle, Norman Douglas
- C. E. Montague: Disenchantment, Fiery Particles
- Havelock Ellis: Selected Essays
- Graham Wallas: Human Nature in Politics
- G. Lowes Dickinson: A Modern Symposium
- W. R. Inge: Outspoken Essays
- Bertrand Russell: What I Believe, On Education, Roads to Freedom
- Alfred North Whitehead: Science and the Modern World
- Arthur Stanley Eddington: The Nature of the Physical World
- Hilaire Belloc: The Path to Rome, The Servile State, The Mercy of Allah, A Picked Company (picked by E. V. Lucas)
- G. K. Chesterton: The Flying Inn, Charles Dickens, The Victorian Age in Literature, Autobiography, stories, essays, poems
- Maurice Baring: Lost Diaries
- W. N. P. Barbellion: The Journal of a Disappointed Man
- Lytton Strachey: Queen Victoria
- Max Beerbohm
- Sir Edmund Gosse: Father and Son
- Arthur Machen: Far Off Things
- Arthur Quiller-Couch: On the Art of Reading
- Alfred George Gardiner: Windfalls
- E. V. Lucas: Loiterers' Harvest, The Gentlest Art (ed.)
- Percy Lubbock: Earlham
- Robert Lynd: Books and Authors

==== Poets ====
- Algernon Charles Swinburne
- W. B. Yeats
- Lord Alfred Douglas
- Robert Bridges
- William Watson
- A. E. Housman
- George William Russell ("A. E.")
- John Davidson
- Alice Meynell
- Laurence Binyon
- Gordon Bottomley
- W. H. Davies
- Walter de la Mare
- John Masefield
- Ralph Hodgson
- Edward Thomas
- Wilfrid Wilson Gibson
- James Stephens
- Lascelles Abercrombie
- John Drinkwater
- Rupert Brooke
- Charlotte Mew: The Farmer's Bride
- James Elroy Flecker
- Wilfred Owen
- J. C. Squire
- Edmund Blunden: Undertones of War
- W. J. Turner: In Times Like Glass, Jack and Jill, Blow for Balloons
- Robert Graves
- Siegfried Sassoon
- Robert Nichols: Ardours and Endurances
- Edith Sitwell
- Osbert Sitwell: Argonaut and Juggernaut
- Sacheverell Sitwell: The 101 Harlequins
- T. S. Eliot
- James Joyce: Chamber Music, Dubliners, Portrait of the Artist as a Young Man
- Richard Church: News from the Mountain
- Roy Campbell: Adamastor
- W. H. Auden: The Dance of Death, The Ascent of F6 (with Christopher Isherwood)
- Cecil Day-Lewis
- Louis MacNeice
- Christopher Hassall: Devil's Dyke and Other Poems

=== Appendix (Penguin edition) ===
The Penguin edition of 1938 included an appendix of books they were offering in paperback for sixpence a volume. Those not already appearing above were:

- W. H. Hudson: The Purple Land
- George Bernard Shaw: Back to Methuselah, The Intelligent Woman's Guide to Socialism, Capitalism, Sovietism, and Fascism
- Alfred North Whitehead: Science and the Modern World
- Roger Fry: Vision and Design
- Olaf Stapledon: Last and First Men
- W. W. Jacobs: Deep Waters
- G. K. Chesterton: The Man Who Was Thursday
- E. C. Bentley: Trent's Last Case
- P. G. Wodehouse: My Man Jeeves
- E. M. Forster: A Passage to India
- Hugh Walpole: Mr Perrin and Mr Traill
- Francis Brett Young: The Crescent Moon
- Aldous Huxley: Crome Yellow
- Osbert Sitwell: Before the Bombardment
