= Sredni Vashtar =

1911 short story by Saki

- Short story by Saki
- Country: United Kingdom
- Genres: Satire, comedy, horror

Publication
- Published in: The Chronicles of Clovis
- Publication date: 1911

"Sredni Vashtar" is a short story by Saki (Hector Hugh Munro), written between 1900 and 1911 and first published in his 1911 short story collection The Chronicles of Clovis. It has been adapted for opera, film, radio and television.

== Plot ==
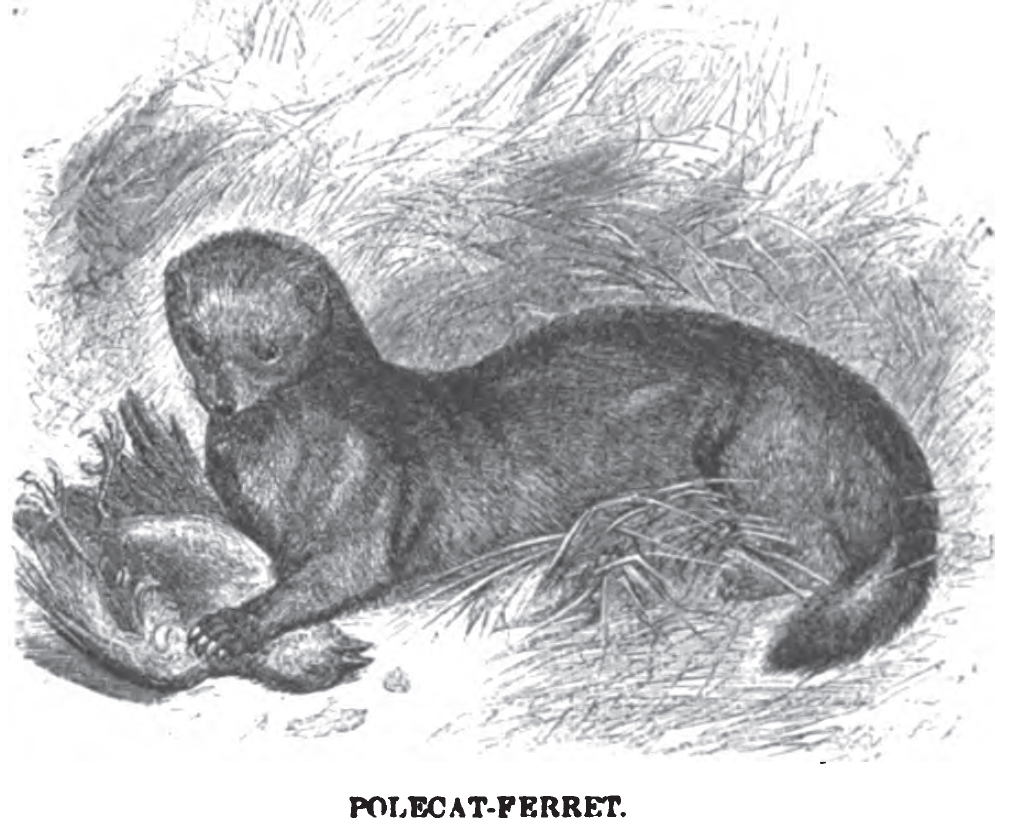
In the story, Sredni Vashtar is a polecat–ferret hybrid.

Conradin, a sickly 10-year-old boy, lives in the care of his despised, overbearing and controlling cousin Mrs De Ropp. He relies on his vivid imagination not only to keep him strong enough to survive, but also to serve as his escape from the real world. Rebelling against Mrs De Ropp's oppressive care, Conradin secretly keeps two animals in an unused garden shed: a hen, which he adores, and a polecat-ferret, which he fears and keeps locked in a hutch. Gradually, Conradin begins to venerate the ferret as a god, naming it "Sredni Vashtar". He worships it weekly, bringing offerings of flowers and berries, and stolen nutmeg for special occasions.

Mrs De Ropp grows concerned over Conradin's visits to the shed. She discovers the hen and sells it. She announces the sale to Conradin, expecting a protest, but to her surprise the boy does not respond. But in secret, he changes his worshipping rituals and asks of his god an unnamed boon: "Do one thing for me, Sredni Vashtar".

When Conradin's visits to the shed do not cease, Mrs De Ropp investigates further, and discovers the locked hutch. Suspecting guinea pigs, she ransacks his room, finds the key, and goes down to the shed, forbidding Conradin to leave the house. While she is gone, Conradin slowly begins to accept defeat, knowing that his god was not real and that his cousin will come out of the shed in triumph. But when Mrs De Ropp fails to reappear after some time, Conradin begins to chant a song of victory. Eventually he sees the ferret emerge from the shed, with dark wet stains around its jaws and throat. It passes out into the garden.

A sour-faced maid announces tea and asks for Mrs De Ropp. Conradin tells her that she has gone to the shed and makes himself a piece of buttered toast. As he enjoys his toast, there are screams from the maid, calls for help from the kitchen staff, and later the sound of something heavy being carried into the house. As voices discuss fervently who should break the news to the boy, Conradin calmly makes himself another piece of toast.

== Adaptations ==
On September 15, 1941, an adaptation of "Sredni Vashtar" began the premiere episode of the CBS Radio series The Orson Welles Show. Blanche Yurka portrayed Mrs De Ropp, with Conrad Binyon as Conradin and Brenda Forbes as Matilda.

"Sredni Vashtar" has been adapted as a chamber opera three times. In 1988 the composer Robert Steadman and the author Richard Adams wrote the 75-minute Sredni Vashtar. In 1996 Cuban-born composer Jorge Martin and librettist Andrew Joffe with the American Chamber Orchestra produced Beast and Superbeast, a group of four chamber operas based on stories by Saki, including "Sredni Vashtar". In 2010 the story was adapted by Nicholas Pavkovic and Jim Coughenour and performed at the San Francisco Conservatory of Music.

"Sredni Vashtar" was the basis of the 1979 horror film The Orphan, also known as Friday the 13th: The Orphan, by the director John Ballard. In 1980 it was adapted for Spine Chillers. In 1981, the short film Sredni Vashtar by British director Andrew Birkin won a BAFTA award and was nominated for an Oscar. In 2003 Angela M. Murray produced a version of the story in the Tartan Shorts series for the BBC, set in Scotland and including shadow puppetry.
