= Lost Hearts =

- Short story by M.R. James
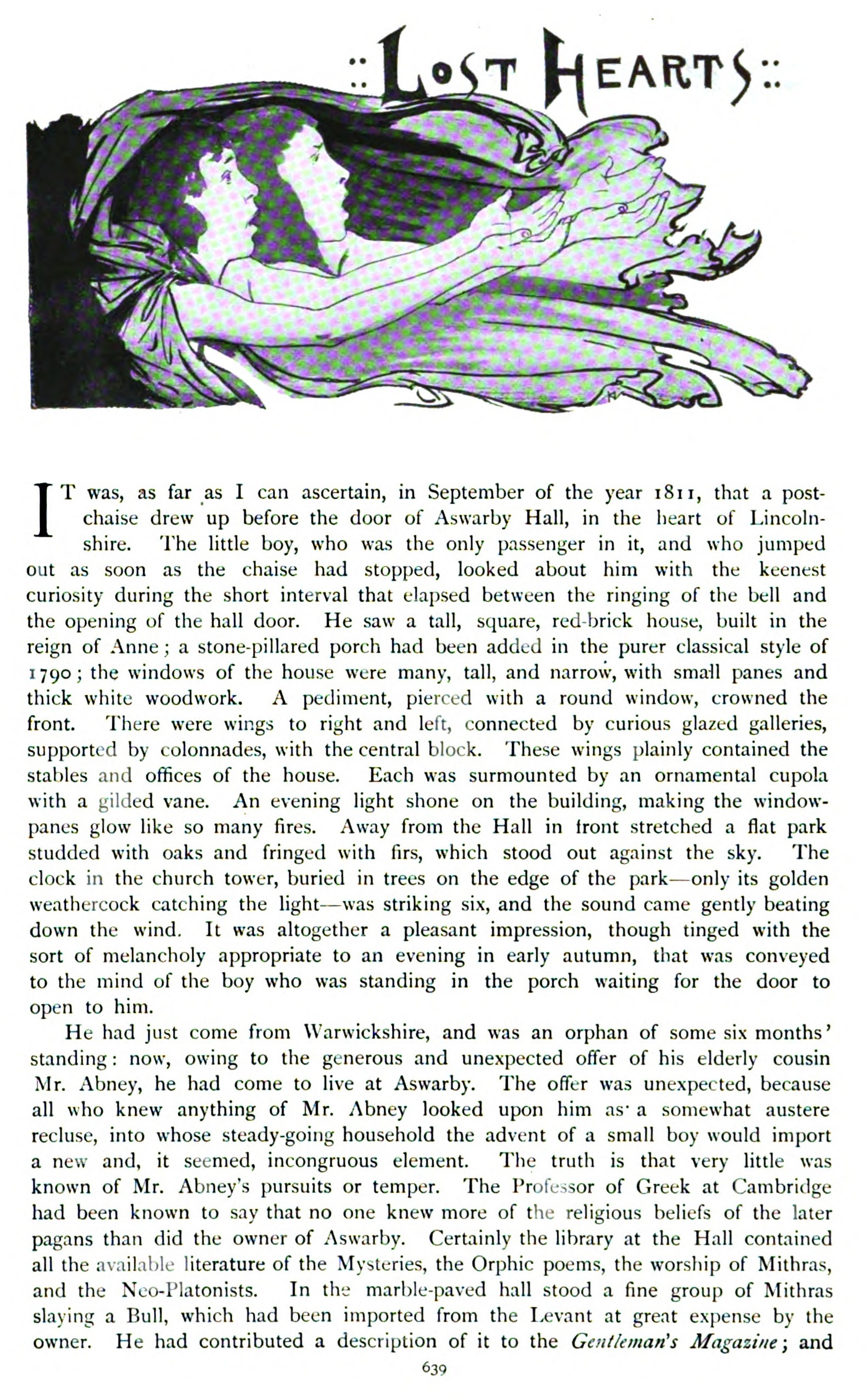
- The first page of "Lost Hearts", as published in The Pall Mall Magazine

Text available at Wikisource
- Country: United Kingdom
- Language: English
- Genre: Horror

Publication
- Published in: The Pall Mall Magazine
- Publication type: Magazine, print
- Publication date: December 1895

"Lost Hearts" is a ghost story by British writer M. R. James, originally published in The Pall Mall Magazine in 1895, and later collected in his books Ghost Stories of an Antiquary (1904) and The Collected Ghost Stories of M. R. James (1931). Set in nineteenth century Lincolnshire, it concerns an occult ritual and supernatural vengeance. It has been adapted many times, including a 1966 episode of Mystery and Imagination, a 1973 episode of A Ghost Story for Christmas, and a 2018 film adaptation.

== Plot summary ==
In 1811, Stephen Elliott, a recently orphaned eleven-year-old boy, is invited to stay with his much older cousin, Mr. Abney, a reclusive expert on the magico-religious practices of late antiquity. Arriving at Mr. Abney's remote Lincolnshire mansion, Aswarby Hall, Stephen swiftly bonds with the housekeeper, Mrs. Bunch, who tells him about a itinerant Italian boy and a gipsy girl Mr. Abney had taken in previously, both of whom mysteriously disappeared.

The night after hearing the story, Stephen dreams of looking through the glazed door of a disused bathroom in Aswarby Hall and seeing "a figure inexpressibly thin and pathetic, of a dusty leaden colour, enveloped in a shroud-like garment, the thin lips crooked into a faint and dreadful smile, the hands pressed tightly over the region of the heart" lying in the bathtub. Upon awakening, Stephen finds himself standing in the hallway; he looks in the bathroom, but sees no sign of the ghostly figure.

In March 1812, Mrs. Bunch complains about having to mend Stephen's nightgown, which has a series of scores above the heart; Stephen is sure they were not there the night before. He observes that there are similar marks on the door of his bedroom. On the following evening, Stephen overhears Mr. Parkes, the butler, tell Mrs. Bunch that he will refuse to go into the wine cellar in the evenings due to hearing a voice come from the furthest away bin.

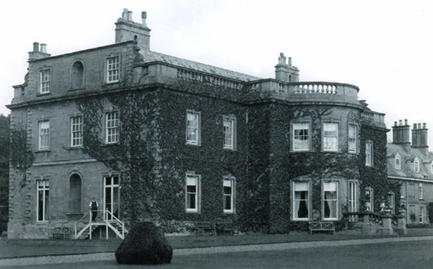
Aswarby Hall, c. 1918

On 24 March 1812, Mr. Abney asks Stephen to come to his study at eleven o'clock that night, telling him not to mention it to anyone else. Looking into the room that evening, Stephen notices a brazier has been moved next to the fire and an aged silver-gilt cup has been filled with red wine; he sees Mr. Abney sprinkling incense from a silver box on the brazier. At ten o'clock that night, as Stephen looks out his bedroom window, he sees two figures standing on the Hall's terrace looking up at the windows: a girl with her hands clasped over her heart, and a ragged boy with "almost transparent hands", "fearfully long" nails, and a "black and gaping rent" over his heart; as he looks at the boy, he telepathically hears a "hungry and desolate" cry. As Stephen watches, the boy and girl move silently out of his sightline. At eleven o'clock, Stephen goes to Mr. Abney's study, but finds he cannot open the door despite it being unlocked. He hears Mr. Abney speaking, then crying out before falling silent. Forcing his way into the study, Stephen finds Mr. Abney dead in a chair, with a "terrible lacerated wound" exposing his heart. Mr. Abney's death is attributed to the coroner to a wildcat or other animal.

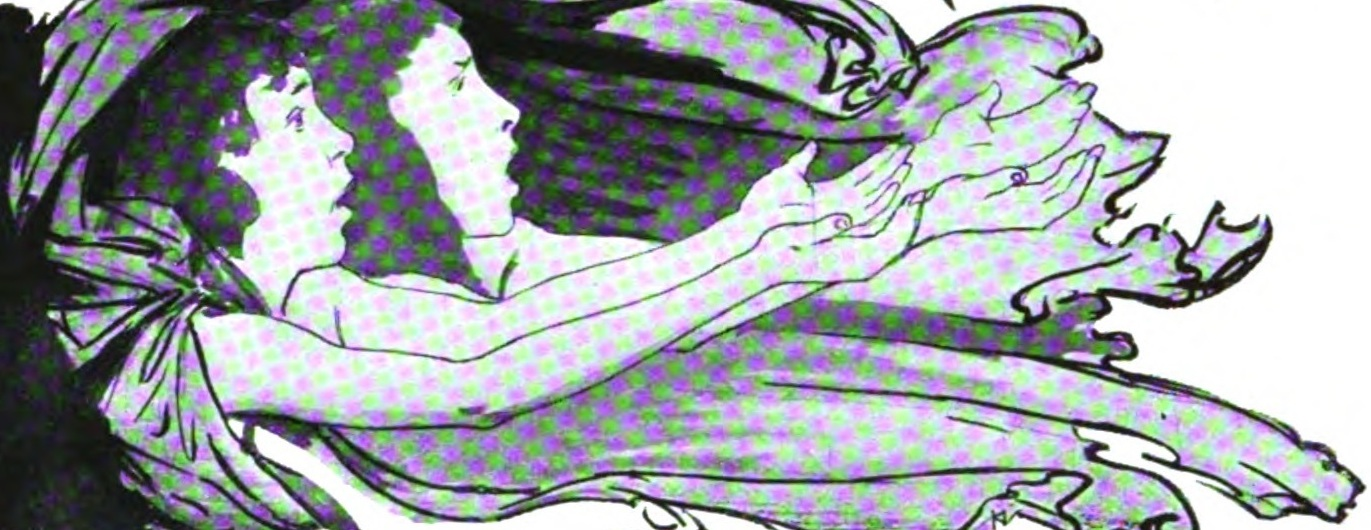
An illustration accompanying the story from The Pall Mall Magazine

When Stephen is older, he reads a document written by Mr. Abney that was found in his study on the night of his death. In the document, Mr. Abney theorises that he can "gain a complete ascendancy over those orders of spiritual beings which control the elemental forces of our universe" and "[eliminate] to a great extent the prospect of death itself" by "absorbing the personalities" of three humans aged under 21. Mr. Abney goes on to explain that the absorption can best be done by removing the heart from a living human, reducing it to ashes, and mixing the ashes with port wine. Mr. Abney notes that he took the heart of Phoebe Stanley on 23 March 1792 and that of Giovanni Paoli on 23 March 1805 (disposing of their remains in the disused bathroom and the wine cellar), and that he intends to take Stephen's heart on 24 March 1812. Mr. Abney closes by admitting that "some annoyance may be experienced from the psychic portion of the subjects, which popular language dignifies with the name of ghosts", but states that he is "little prone to attach importance to the feeble efforts of these beings to wreak their vengeance".

== Publication ==
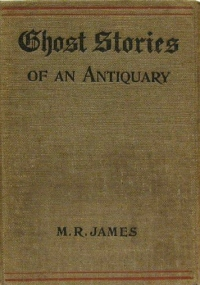
"Lost Hearts" was collected in James' book Ghost Stories of an Antiquary in 1904.

"Lost Hearts" was written between July 1892 and October 1893. On 28 October 1893, James read it to the Chit-Chat Club at the University of Cambridge. It was first published in volume 7, issue 32 of The Pall Mall Magazine in December 1895 with illustrations from the American artist Simon Harmon Vedder. It was collected in Ghost Stories of an Antiquary in 1904 and again in The Collected Ghost Stories of M. R. James in 1931. It has since been anthologised many times, including in The Supernatural Reader in 1953.

== Reception ==
Montague Summers regarded "Lost Hearts" as one of James' best stories. James himself was not fond of the story, regarding it as "filler".

Jacqueline Simpson suggested "Lost Hearts" was inspired by Danish folklore, while Jane Mainley-Piddock described the story as having "mythic or fairy-tale qualities".

== The occult scholarship of Mr. Abney ==
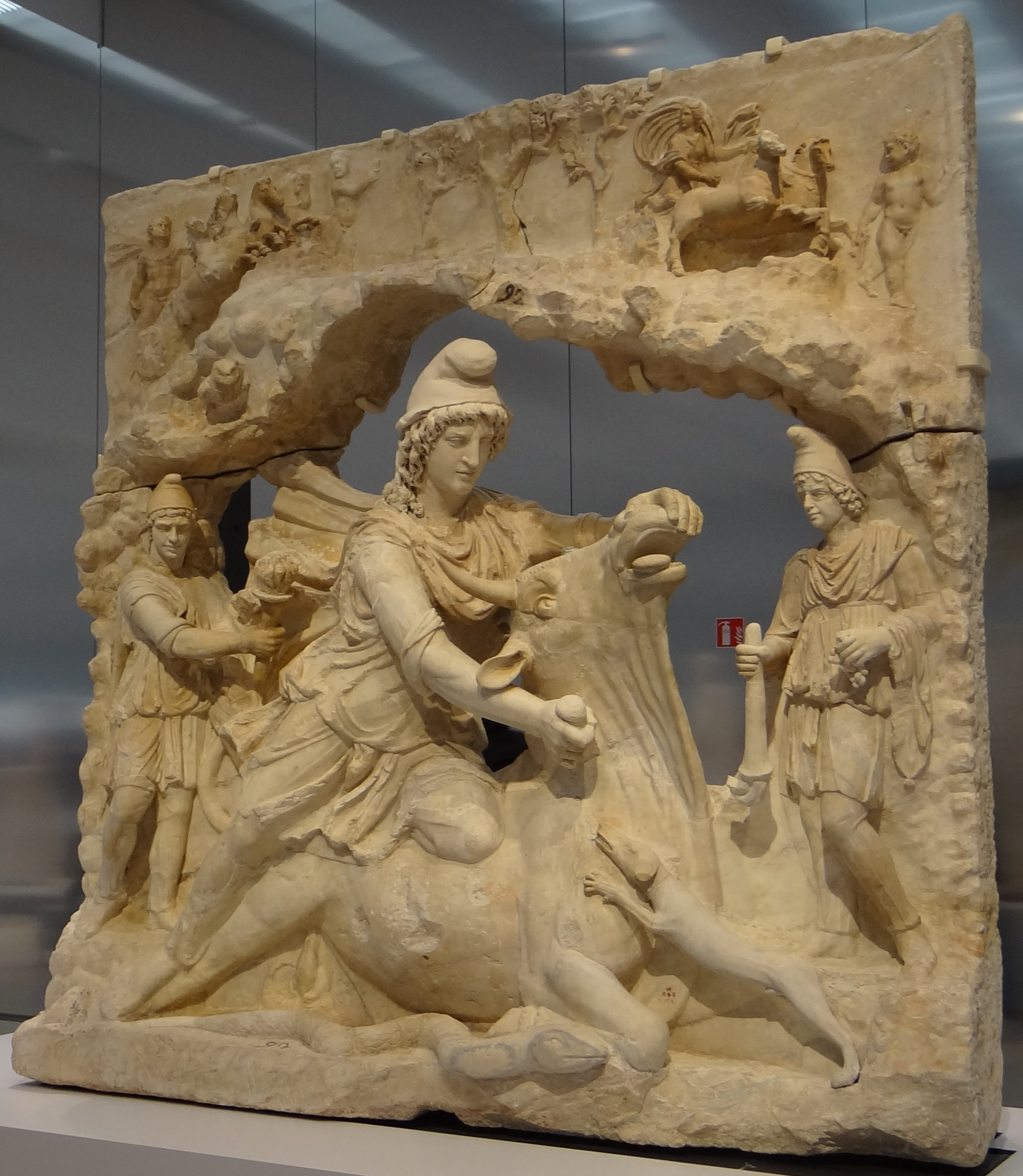
Sculpture of Mithras sacrificing the bull, of the type described as having been brought from the Levant to Aswarby by Mr. Abney

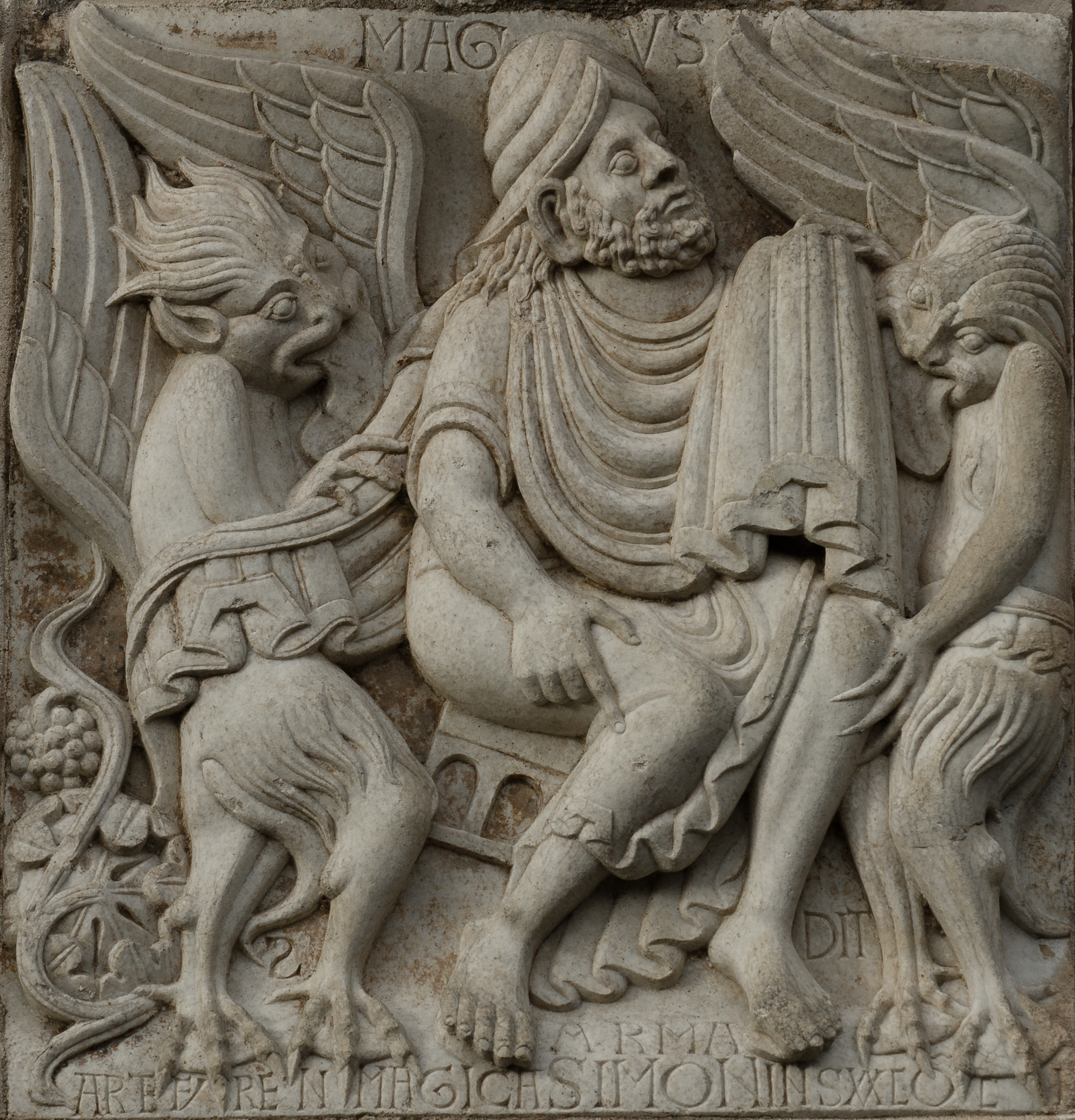
Biblical magician Simon Magus whom Mr. Abney describes as having acquired magical powers through the sacrifice of a boy

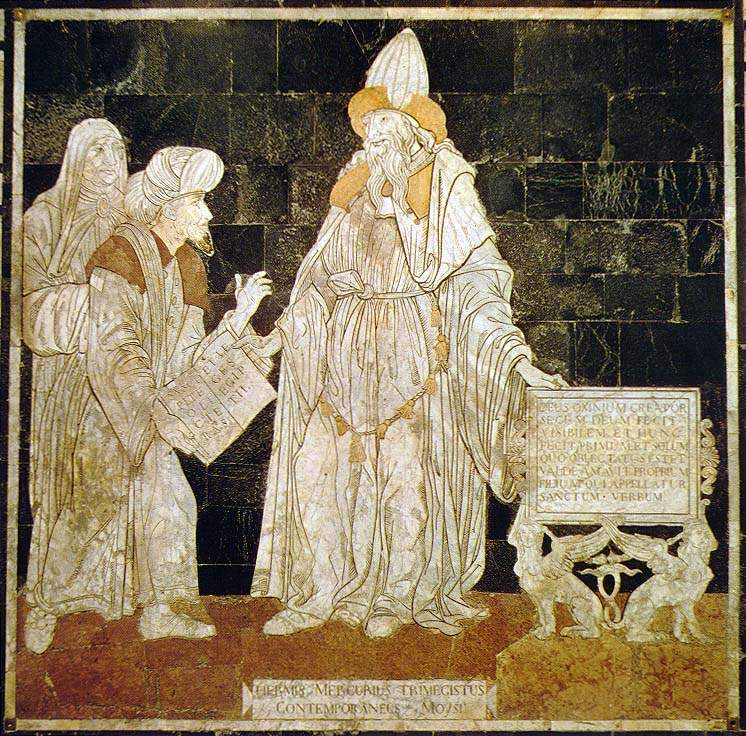
Hermes Trismegistus, the Alchemical magus to whom Mr. Abney attributes the magical ritual of 'absorbing' the calcined hearts of three children, to obtain occult powers

In keeping with the antiquarian interests and considerable personal erudition that this author brings to bear in the settings which he creates for his stories, James provides a considerable amount of background information regarding the field of study of the ruthless and unprincipled classical scholar Mr. Abney – who regards the child murder of orphans as no more than a means to a (black) magical end. Abney's scholarship encompasses the belief systems of Neoplatonism, the mystery religions of late antiquity – notably Mithraism and Orphism, as well as the pseudoscience/mystical system of alchemy. In the course of the story, Abney mentions not only Censorinus, author of the treatise De die Natali (Note: Latin for "Concerning Birthdays".), but also the mythical founder of Alchemy Hermes Trismegistus and the biblically attested magician, and founder of a gnostic sect, Simon Magus.

The spring equinox was approaching, as Mr. Abney frequently reminded his cousin, adding that this had been always considered by the ancients to be a critical time for the young: that Stephen would do well to take care of himself, and to shut his bedroom window at night; and that Censorinus had some valuable remarks on the subject…It is recorded of Simon Magus that he was able to fly in the air, to become invisible, or to assume any form he pleased, by the agency of the soul of a boy whom, to use the libellous phrase employed by the author of the Clementine Recognitions, he had "murdered." I find it set down, moreover, with considerable detail in the writings of Hermes Trismegistus, that similar happy results may be produced by the absorption of the hearts of not less than three human beings below the age of twenty-one years.

According to the Early Christian/Gnostic religious romance the Clementine Recognitions (to which James makes his character refer in the second of the two passages quoted above):

Simon claimed that he could make himself visible or invisible at will, pass through rocks as if they were clay, throw himself down from a mountain unhurt, loose himself when bound, animate statues, make trees spring up; throw himself into a fire without harm, appear to have two faces: "I shall change myself into a sheep or a goat. I shall make a beard to grow upon little boys. I shall ascend by flight into the air, I shall exhibit abundance of gold. I shall make and unmake kings. I shall be worshipped as God, I shall have divine honors publicly assigned to me, so that an image of me shall be set up, and I shall be adored as God."

Furthermore (and with particular relevance to the main theme of "Lost Hearts"), the author of the Clementine Recognitions records an episode in which Simon made a familiar spirit for himself by conjuring the soul out of a boy and keeping his image in his bedroom. Theosophist G.R.S. Mead provides a fuller account of this episode, furnishing a translation of the lengthier version in the Clementine Homilies, of which the following is an extract:

Simon did not stop at murder, as he confessed to Nicetas and Aquila "as a friend to friends." In fact he separated the soul of a boy from his body to act as a confederate in his phenomena. And this is the magical modus operandi. "He delineates the boy on a statue which he keeps consecrated in the inner part of the house where he sleeps, and he says that after he has fashioned him out of the air by certain divine transmutations, and has sketched his form, he returns him again to the air."

== Adaptations ==
On 16 September 1946, the anthology series Stories Old and New featured David Lloyd James reading a 20-minute version of "Lost Hearts" for the BBC Home Service.

On 25 December 1957, the association between M. R. James and the festive period began as "Lost Hearts" was read by Hugh Burden on the BBC Third Programme.

On 5 March 1966, "Lost Hearts" was first adapted for television by ABC and broadcast by ITV as an episode of the Mystery and Imagination series, starring Freddie Jones as Mr. Abney and Megs Jenkins as Mrs. Bunch.

On 23 December 1971, BBC Radio 3's Study on 3 presented the second episode of four-part analysis of The Horror Story, titled "Ghosts". The episode featured a discussion with Jonathan Miller and a reading of "Lost Hearts" by Bernard Cribbins. The series was repeated the following year.

In 1973, "Lost Hearts" was adapted by Robin Chapman as part of the BBC's A Ghost Story for Christmas strand, directed by Lawrence Gordon Clark. The shortest of the adaptations, Lost Hearts was first broadcast on Christmas Day 1973 at 11:35 pm. It starred Simon Gipps-Kent as the orphan Stephen and Joseph O'Conor as Mr. Abney. The adaptation is noted for the distinctive hurdy-gurdy music that accompanies appearances of the two ghostly children. Ralph Vaughan Williams' English Folk Song Suite is also featured. Now curated by the British Film Institute, this version of Lost Hearts has been released on DVD sets with other entries in the strand and in December 2022 on Blu-ray.

On 27 December 1977, BBC producer Michell Raper presented a 30-minute talk entitled The Ghosts of M. R. James, which also featured readings by Gerald Cross, Norman Shelley and Kenneth Fortescue from "Lost Hearts" and other works of James'.

On 31 October 1978, the Hallowe'en edition of Radio 4's Forget Tomorrow's Monday ("a Sunday morning miscellany") featured Peter Underwood (president of the Ghost Club) talking "about all things strange, from Alchemy to Zombies", and Peter Cushing, who gave a reading of "Lost Hearts".

From 29 December 1997 through to 2 January 1998, The Late Book: Ghost Stories featured readings of "Lost Hearts" and four other story by James. The stories were abridged and produced by Paul Kent and read by Benjamin Whitrow. Episodes were repeated regularly on BBC 7 (Later becoming BBC Radio 7) from December 2003, then on Radio 4 Extra from 2011. According to the BBC Genome database, the episodes were originally transmitted in a 30-minute slot; however, these listings may be incomplete, as all subsequent broadcasts have been 15 minutes long.

In 2009, Nunkie Theatre Company toured A Warning to the Curious around the UK and Ireland. This one-man show was a retelling of two of James's tales, "Lost Hearts" and "A Warning to the Curious".

In 2007, Radio 4 presented M.R. James at Christmas, a series of five plays in the Woman's Hour Drama slot. Stories adapted included "Lost Hearts" with Peter Marinker as Abney. The plays were adapted by Chris Harrald and directed and produced by Gemma Jenkins. Each episode was introduced by Derek Jacobi as James himself. The series ran from Christmas Eve to 28 December, culminating in an original Jamesian drama, A Warning to the Furious. The episodes were repeated on BBC 7 in December 2009 and (under the title M. R. James Stories) on Radio 4 Extra in 2011 and 2018.

April 2007 saw the release of Tales of the Supernatural, Volume One, an audiobook presentation by Fantom Films, featuring James stories including "Lost Hearts" read by Geoffrey Bayldon.

In 2016, John Reppion and Leah Moore published Ghost Stories of an Antiquary, a graphic novel adaptation of four of James' stories, including "Lost Hearts" (illustrated by Kit Buss).

In 2018, a third film adaptation of the short story was released by Severn Film Productions in association with Action Image Productions, co-written by Lynn Davies and directed by Max Van De Banks. The production features Nicholas Amer as Mr Abney, Louis Newton as Stephen Elliott, Margaret Baldwin as Mrs Bunch, Mark Llewellin as Mr Parks and Eleanor Catherine Smart as Emily. The film was shot on location at Eastnor Castle and Hellens Manor in Herefordshire and the Gloucestershire Warwickshire Steam Railway. The story is updated to the 1940s (and later 1953) when, following the death of Stephen's parents, the young boy has been evacuated to the countryside during World War II. This production is unusual in that the film was shot in two parts, with the main elements being filmed in 2005 and the beginning and end of the film in 2016, with Louis Newton returning as Stephen, now a young man recounting to his bride-to-be the story of what happened ten years earlier. The film was entered in The Bristol International Film Festival and received a nomination at the Moving Pictures Festival in Nieuwmoer, Belgium in 2018.

On 31 December 2019, the second episode of Ghost Stories from Ambridge (a spin-off from The Archers) featured a reading of "Lost Hearts" ("on a biting December night, in the darkened attic of Lower Loxley, Jim Lloyd enthrals an assembly of Ambridge residents with three chilling ghost stories from the turn of the last century", teased the BBC webpage.) John Rowe played narrator Jim Lloyd and the 14-minute script was abridged by Jeremy Osborne.

== Gallery ==
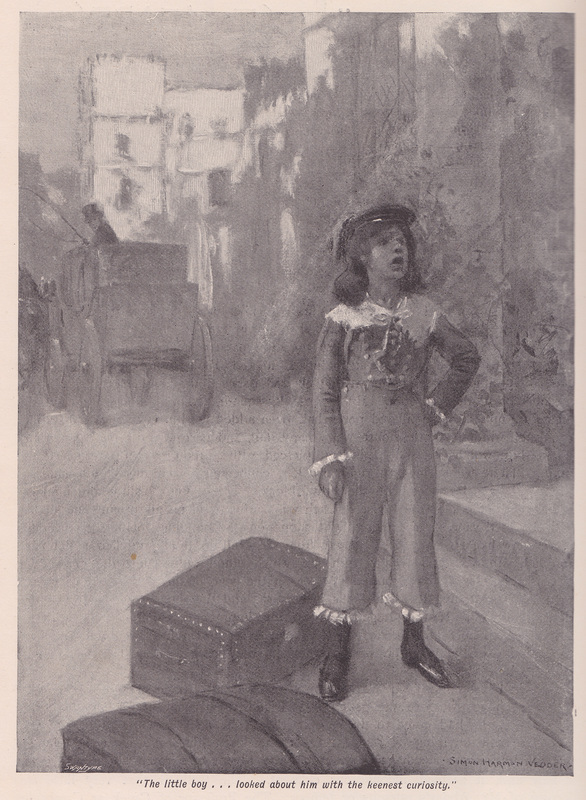
"The little boy… looked around him with keenest curiosity."

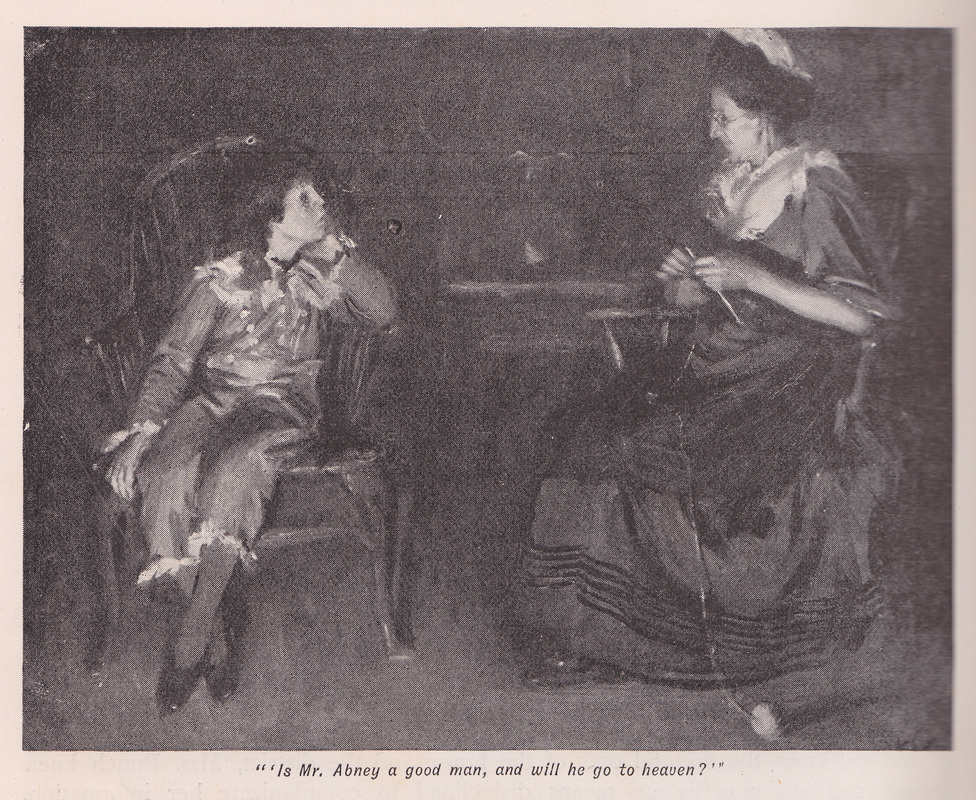
"'Is Mr. Abney a good man, and will he go to heaven?'"

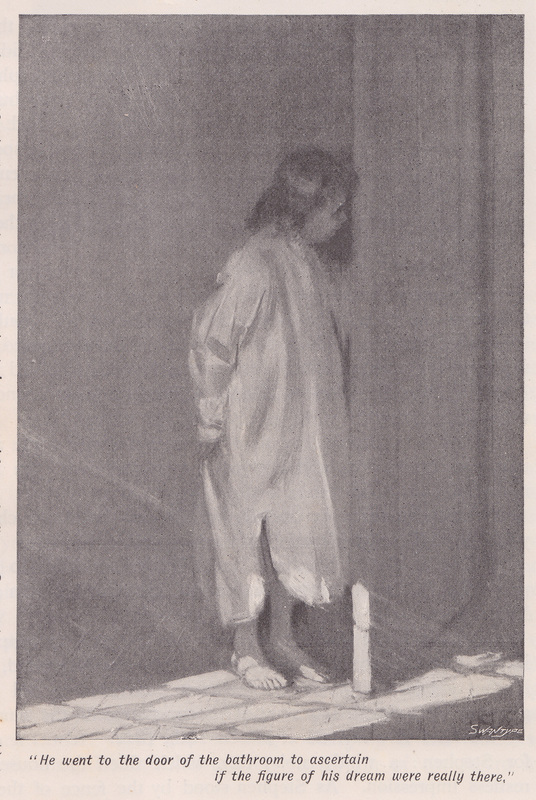
"He went to the door of the bathroom to ascertain if the figure of his dreams were really there."

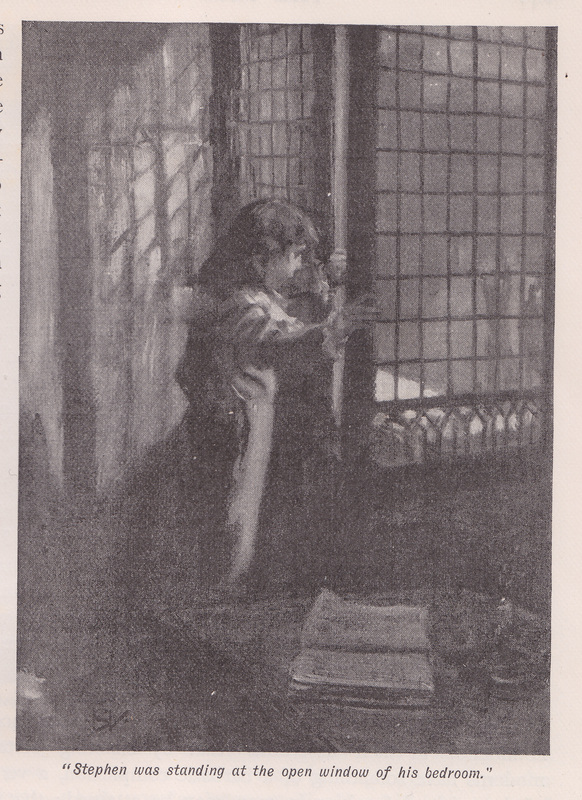
"Stephen was standing at the open window of his bedroom."

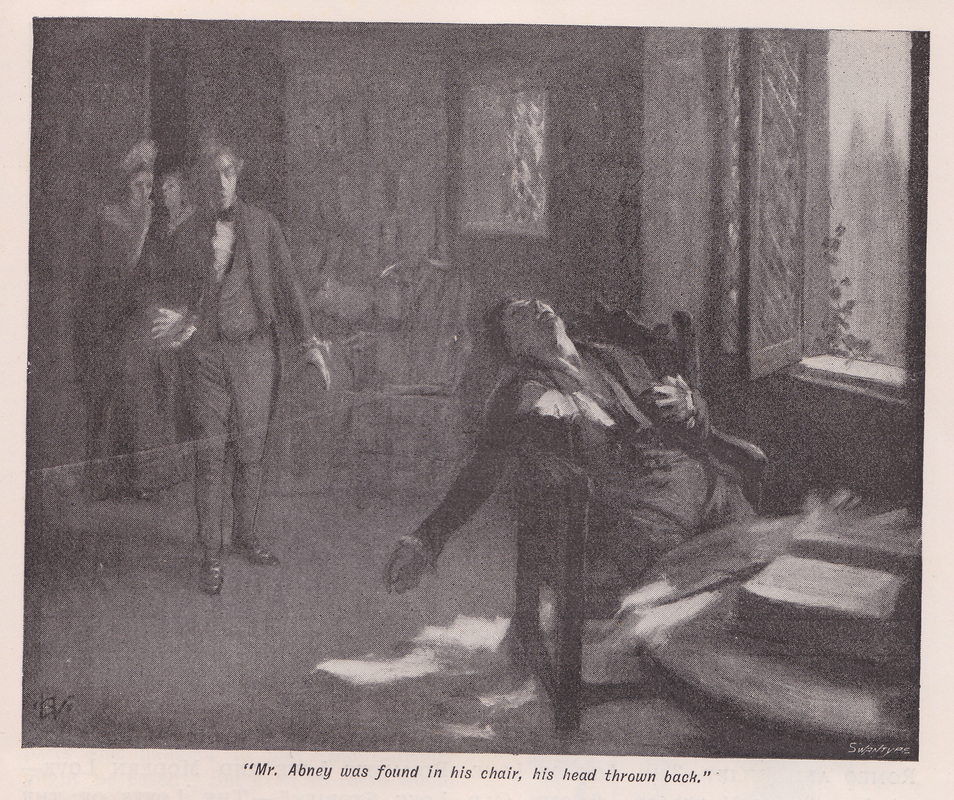
"Mr. Abney was found in his chair, his head thrown back."
