= When William Came =

1913 invasion fiction by Saki

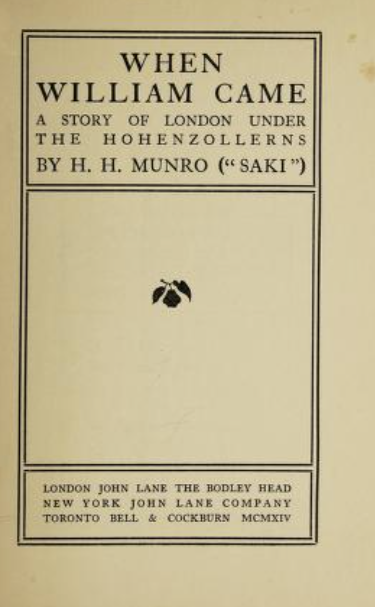
- Title page for When William Came: A Story of London Under the Hohenzollerns (1913)
- Author: Saki
- Published: 1913
- Publisher: John Lane
- Pages: 322
- Preceded by: The Unbearable Bassington
- Followed by: Beasts and Super-Beasts

When William Came: A Story of London Under the Hohenzollerns is a novel written by the British author Saki (the pseudonym of Hector Hugh Munro) and published in November 1913. It is set several years in what was then the future, after a war between Germany and Great Britain in which the former won.

== Plot ==
The "William" of the book's title is German Emperor Kaiser Wilhelm II of the House of Hohenzollern. The book chronicles life in London under German occupation and the changes that come with a foreign army's invasion and triumph. Like Robert Erskine Childers's novel The Riddle of the Sands (1903), it predicts the Great War (in which Saki would be killed) and is an example of invasion literature, a literary genre which flourished at the beginning of the 20th century as tensions between the European great powers increased.

Much of the book is an argument for compulsory military service, about which there was then a major controversy. The scene in which an Imperial Rescript is announced in a subjugated London, excusing the unmilitary British from serving in the Kaiser's armies, is particularly bitter. There are also several vignettes exemplifying the differences between the English and continental systems of law – Yeovil's wife informs him that she must register his presence with the police and later he is fined on the spot for walking on the grass in Hyde Park. In another episode, he finds himself unintentionally but unavoidably fraternising with one of the invaders.

== Anthologies ==
It has been collected in:

- England Invaded (1977)

It has been reprinted with

- The Battle of Dorking. Oxford University Press. 1997. ISBN 0-19-283285-9.

== See also ==
- Invasion literature
