= Beasts and Super-Beasts =

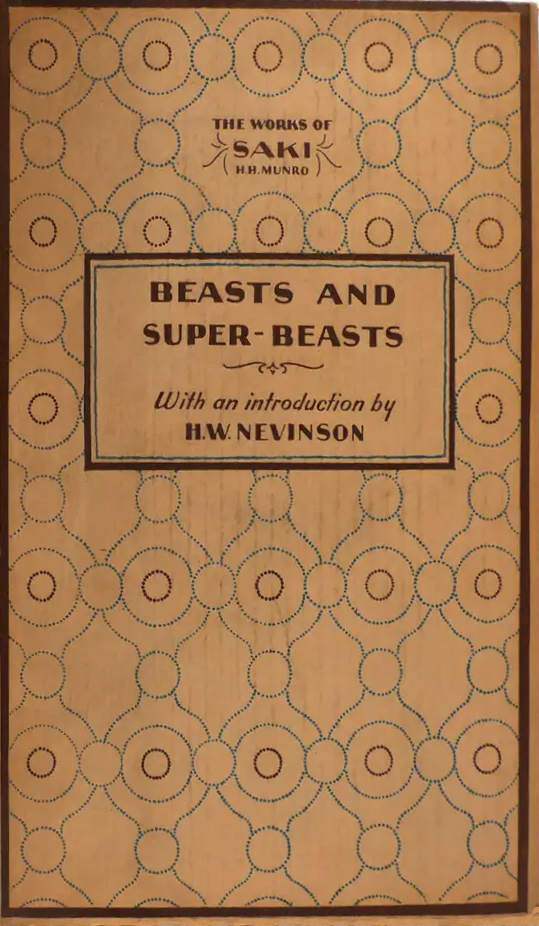
- Author: Saki
- Language: English
- Genre: Short Stories
- Publisher: John Lane
- Publication date: 1914
- Preceded by: When William Came
- Followed by: The Toys of Peace

Beasts and Super-Beasts is a collection of short stories, written by Saki (the literary pseudonym of Hector Hugh Munro) and first published in 1914. The title parodies that of George Bernard Shaw's Man and Superman.

Along with The Chronicles of Clovis, Beasts and Super-Beasts is one of Saki's best-known works. It was his final collection of stories before his death in World War I, and several of its stories, in particular "The Open Window", are reprinted frequently in anthologies.

The majority of the volume's stories deal in some fashion with animals, providing the source for its title. The character of Clovis Sangrail, featured in earlier works by Saki, appears in several stories. Most of the stories appeared previously in periodicals.

Stylistically, Beasts and Super-Beasts displays the simple language, cynicism and wry humor that characterize Saki's earlier literary output.

== Contents ==
The book contains the following stories:

- "The She-Wolf"
- "Laura"
- "The Boar-Pig"
- "The Brogue"
- "The Hen"
- "The Open Window"
- "The Treasure-Ship"
- "The Cobweb"
- "The Lull"
- "The Unkindest Blow"
- "The Romancers"
- "The Schartz-Metterklume Method"
- "The Seventh Pullet"
- "The Blind Spot"
- "Dusk"
- "A Touch of Realism"
- "Cousin Teresa"
- "The Yarkand Manner"
- "The Byzantine Omelette"
- "The Feast of Nemesis"
- "The Dreamer"
- "The Quince Tree"
- "The Forbidden Buzzards"
- "The Stake"
- "Clovis on Parental Responsibilities"
- "A Holiday Task"
- "The Stalled Ox"
- "The Story-Teller"
- "A Defensive Diamond"
- "The Elk"
- "Down Pens"
- "The Name-Day"
- "The Lumber Room"
- "Fur"
- "The Philanthropist and the Happy Cat"
- "On Approval"
