= The Monster of Lake LaMetrie =

1899 short story by Wardon Allan Curtis

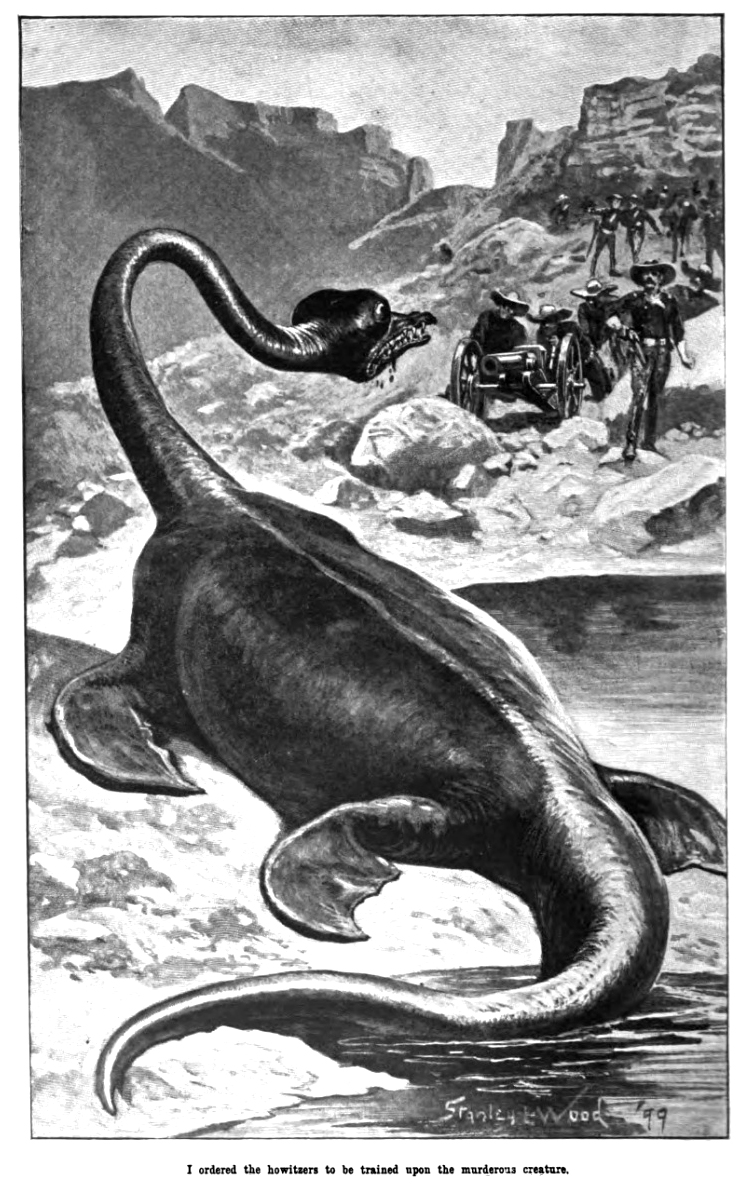
Illustration from The Monster of Lake LaMetrie.

"The Monster of Lake LaMetrie" is a short story by American writer Wardon Allan Curtis. It was originally published in September 1899 in Pearson's Magazine and collected in Sam Moskowitz's Science Fiction by Gaslight, Hank Davis' The Baen Big Book of Monsters and Michael Moorcock's England Invaded. Its original publication featured illustrations by Stanley L. Wood.

== Plot ==
The story is told through the extracts of a diary written from 1896 to 1897 by a professor and physician named James McLennegan, addressed to a colleague, Professor William G. Breyfogle.

McLennegan had been studying Lake LaMetrie, a lake within the mountains of Wyoming. With him was a sickly boy named Edward Framingham, who came along in hopes of recovering from dyspepsia. McLennegan's reason for studying the lake is for its remarkable property of prehistoric life washing ashore, such as tree-like ferns and placoderms. McLennegan believes that the lake is connected to an “inner Earth” from which the plants and animals originate.

One night, a loud roaring brings McLennegan's and Framingham's attention to the lake. The roaring is the result of the lake's rapid rising, which forces McLennegan and Framingham out of their makeshift house. The next morning, the lake's level is back to normal as the result of a whirlpool. McLennegan knows this to be one of the lake's discharges of strange life, and discovers what seems to be a short, thick log with a long root attached to it. The next day, while walking along the shore, McLennegan finds that the “log” is actually a live Elasmosaurus. The beast attacks him, but McLennegan slices the top of its head off with a machete and removes its brain, which is found to be remarkably a lot like a human's. Despite the brain's removal, the creature's body continues to operate.

The next day, Framingham almost dies, with only his mind still functioning. Using his knowledge and skills of surgery, McLennegan removes Framingham's brain and grafts it into the Elasmosaurus’s head. Seven days later, the beast begins to stir, and five days after that, starts to interact with McLennegan – the beast can understand him, and later is able to speak somewhat rudimentarily.

Although the situation is peaceful at first, Framingham's behavior has significantly changed a year later to that of the animal his mind controls. McLennegan's last entry indicates that he will be leaving.

The narrative is then revealed to have been found by a military captain, Arthur Fairchild, who discovered the beast eating McLennegan while searching for Native Americans who left their reservation. He had ordered the team to fire upon the creature, killing it, and found the manuscript with McLennegan's remains.

== Influences ==
The Monster of Lake LaMetrie is part of the tradition of Hollow Earth and lost world literature. In particular, it bears the clear influence of Jules Verne's Journey to the Center of the Earth (1864), sharing the motif of a plesiosaur surviving into modern times in an underground body of water. Within the text, the character of McLennegan mentions John Cleves Symmes Jr. by name as a proponent of the Hollow Earth theory.

Curtis' story was written in the wake of the Bone Wars (1877-1892), an ongoing rivalry between American paleontologists Othniel Charles Marsh and Edward Drinker Cope, during which over a hundred dinosaur species were discovered and described across Nebraska, Colorado, and Wyoming. The publicity around the Bone Wars helped to popularize dinosaurs in the American public consciousness, and link them to the western United States. Prior to the Bone Wars, Cope had formally described and named the Elasmosaurus in 1868. By the year of the story's publication in Pearson's Magazine, Wyoming in particular was still a popular destination for hopeful paleontologists from eastern museums.

The idea that prehistoric animals might still be extant on the American frontier had earlier been promoted by Thomas Jefferson, who, as early as 1799, was speculating that the mastodon might survive somewhere in the continental interior.

== Legacy ==
The Monster of Lake LaMetrie is an early instance of the Weird West genre, blending science fiction tropes with a frontier setting. The idea of Mesozoic animals surviving in remote corners of the American or Canadian West would appear again in The Monster of "Partridge Creek" (1908), and in such films as The Ghost of Slumber Mountain (1918), The Beast of Hollow Mountain (1956), and The Valley of Gwangi (1969).

== Reception ==
Algis Budrys said that the story was effective but wished that the author had further developed events.
