= The Westminster Alice =

1902 novel by Saki

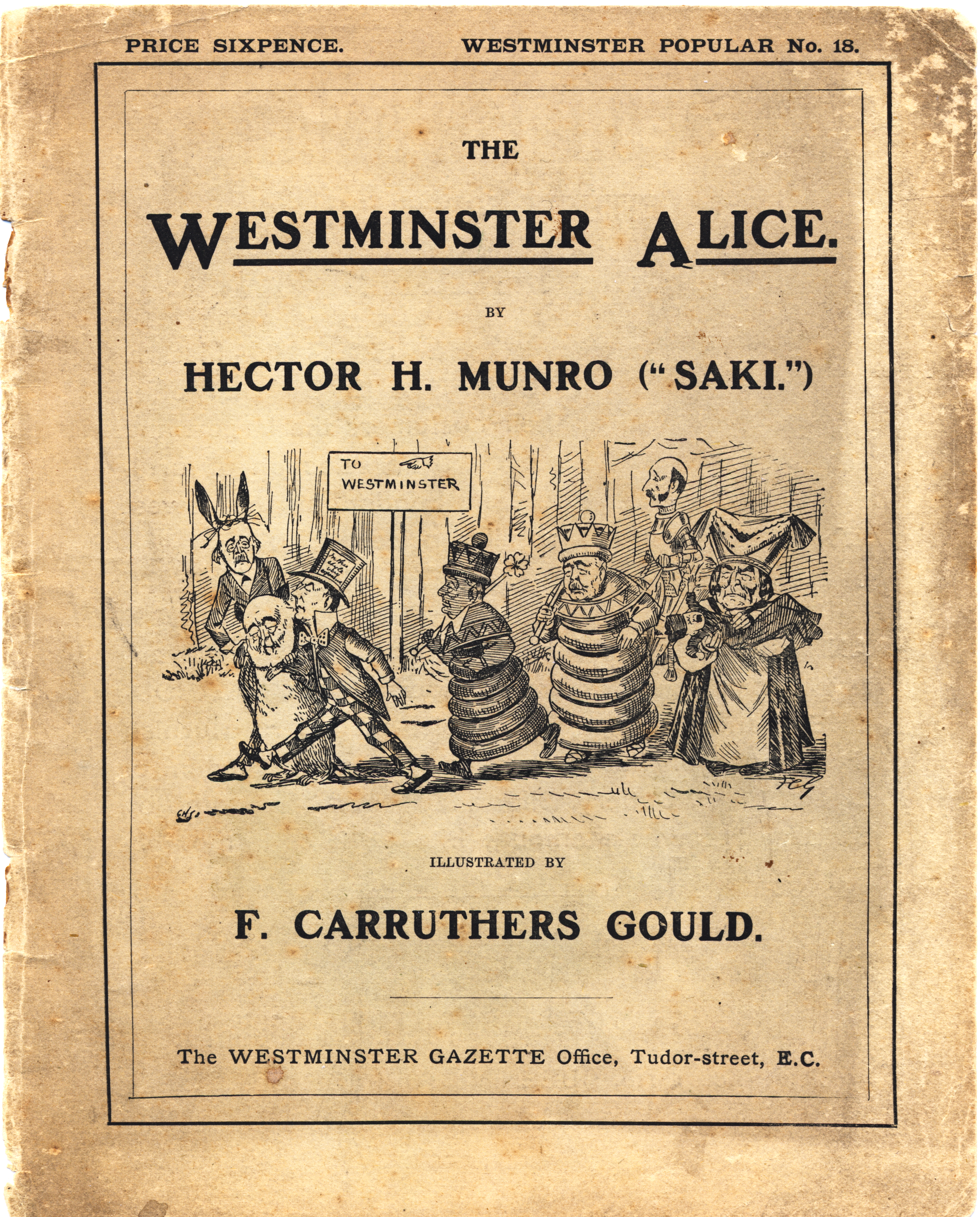
- First edition cover of The Westminster Alice
- Author: Hector Hugh Munro (Saki)
- Language: English
- Genre: Fantasy novel, parody
- Published: 1902 (The Westminster Gazette)
- Publication place: United Kingdom
- Media type: Print (hardback)
- Pages: xii, 152

The Westminster Alice is the name of a collection of vignettes written by Hector Hugh Munro (Saki) in 1902 and published by The Westminster Gazette of London. It is a political parody of Lewis Carroll's two books, Alice's Adventures in Wonderland (1865) and Through the Looking-Glass (1871).

The book features 48 drawings by Francis Carruthers Gould, after the originals by John Tenniel.

It is critical of the politics of the day, of which Alice tries to make sense. A number of notable British politicians are identified in the book. Joseph Chamberlain is the Queen of Hearts, the Red Queen, and the Mad Hatter; Arthur Balfour is the White Queen and the March Hare; the Marquess of Salisbury is the King of Hearts and the Dormouse; Archbishop of Canterbury Frederick Temple is the Duchess; and Redvers Buller is Humpty Dumpty.
