= The Watched Pot =

Play by Saki and Charles Maude

The Watched Pot (alternative title The Mistress of Briony) is a romantic comedy play by Saki and Charles Maude published in 1924. The play, all three acts of which are set in the fictional English country house of Briony Manor, revolves around the search for a suitable bride for young Trevor Bavvel, who is the sole heir to the estate. The present owner is the widowed Hortensia Bavvel, his mother, who is a bossy and short-tempered woman.

The Watched Pot had its professional premiere on July 14, 1930, during the third summer stock season of the University Players. It was directed by Bretaigne Windust. Among the cast were Henry Fonda (William), Elizabeth Johnson (Sybil Bumont), Christine Ramsey (Agatha Clifford), Charles Leatherbee (Trevor Bavvel), Elizabeth Fenner (Hortensia Bavvel), Kent Smith (Ludovic Bavvel), Aleta Freel (Clare Henessey), Bretaigne Windust (Rene St. Gall), Thomas Bartlett Quigley (Stephen Sparrowby), Robert C. Leatherbee (The Youngest Drummond Boy), Alfred Dalrymple (Col. Mutsome), and Nancy Sullivan (Mrs. Peter Vulpy).
