= Rothay Reynolds =

Rothay Reynolds (1872–1940) was an English journalist. Before the First World War he worked in Russia and was a friend of Saki. He dedicated My Slav Friends to Saki and contributed a memoir to the posthumous collection The Toys of Peace.

He worked in Berlin for the Daily Mail between the First and Second World Wars and interviewed Adolf Hitler in 1923, making him one of the first foreign correspondents to interview the future German leader.

== Interviewing Hitler ==
Reynolds was "one of the few journalists who had the foresight to interest themselves in the Nazi movement at a time when it seemed quite off the map," according to an obituary in The Times newspaper.

He worked for the Mail in Berlin between 1921 and 1938. He returned to England before the outbreak of the Second World War and wrote When Freedom Shrieked, which revealed what life was like under the Nazis.

== Death ==
He died in Jerusalem, then part of Mandatory Palestine, in the summer of 1940. He had been based in Rome for the Daily Telegraph for a few months earlier in 1940 but left when Benito Mussolini brought the country into the war on the side of Germany. After an arduous wartime journey through the Balkans and Middle-East he died from pneumonia in Jerusalem on 20 August 1940.
