= Gabriel-Ernest =

- Short story by H. H. Munro

Text available at Wikisource
- Country: United Kingdom
- Genre: Horror

Publication
- Publisher: The Westminster Gazette
- Publication date: 29 May 1909

"Gabriel-Ernest" is a 1909 short story by British writer H. H. Munro, better known as Saki. The story was included in The Westminster Gazette and appears in Munro's collection Reginald in Russia published by Methuen & Co. in 1910.

== Summary ==
"Gabriel-Ernest" starts with a warning: "There is a wild beast in your woods..." As the story progresses, we learn from that Gabriel is indeed wild, feral – a werewolf in fact. The story uses the idea of lycanthropy as a metaphor for adolescence. The story's climax is when Gabriel is revealed to have taken a small child home from Sunday school. A pursuit ensues, but Gabriel and the child disappear near a river. The only items found are the clothes of Gabriel, and the two are never seen again.

== Reprints ==
- The Supernatural Reader, ed. Groff Conklin & Lucy Conklin, London: World/WDL Books, 1958
- Alone By Night, ed. Michael & Don Congdon, Ballantine 1962
- Fantasy: Shapes of Things Unknown, ed. Edmund J. Farrell, Thomas E. Gage, John Pfordresher & Raymond J. Rodrigues, Scott, Foresman 1974
- Quickie Thrillers, ed. Arthur Liebman, Pocket Books 1975
- Deadly Nightshade, ed. Peter Haining, London: Gollancz 1977
- Shape Shifters, ed. Jane Yolen, Seabury Press, 1978
- Werewolf!, ed. Bill Pronzini, Arbor, 1979
- Horror Stories, ed. Susan Price, Kingfisher, 1995
- The Literary Werewolf: An Anthology, ed. Charlotte F. Otten, Syracuse University Press, 2002
- Classic Horror Stories, ed. Charles A. Coulombe, Globe Pequot Press/The Lyons Press, 2003
- Unnatural Creatures, ed. Neil Gaiman, HarperCollins Publishers 2013
