= The Chronicles of Clovis =

1911 short story collection by Saki

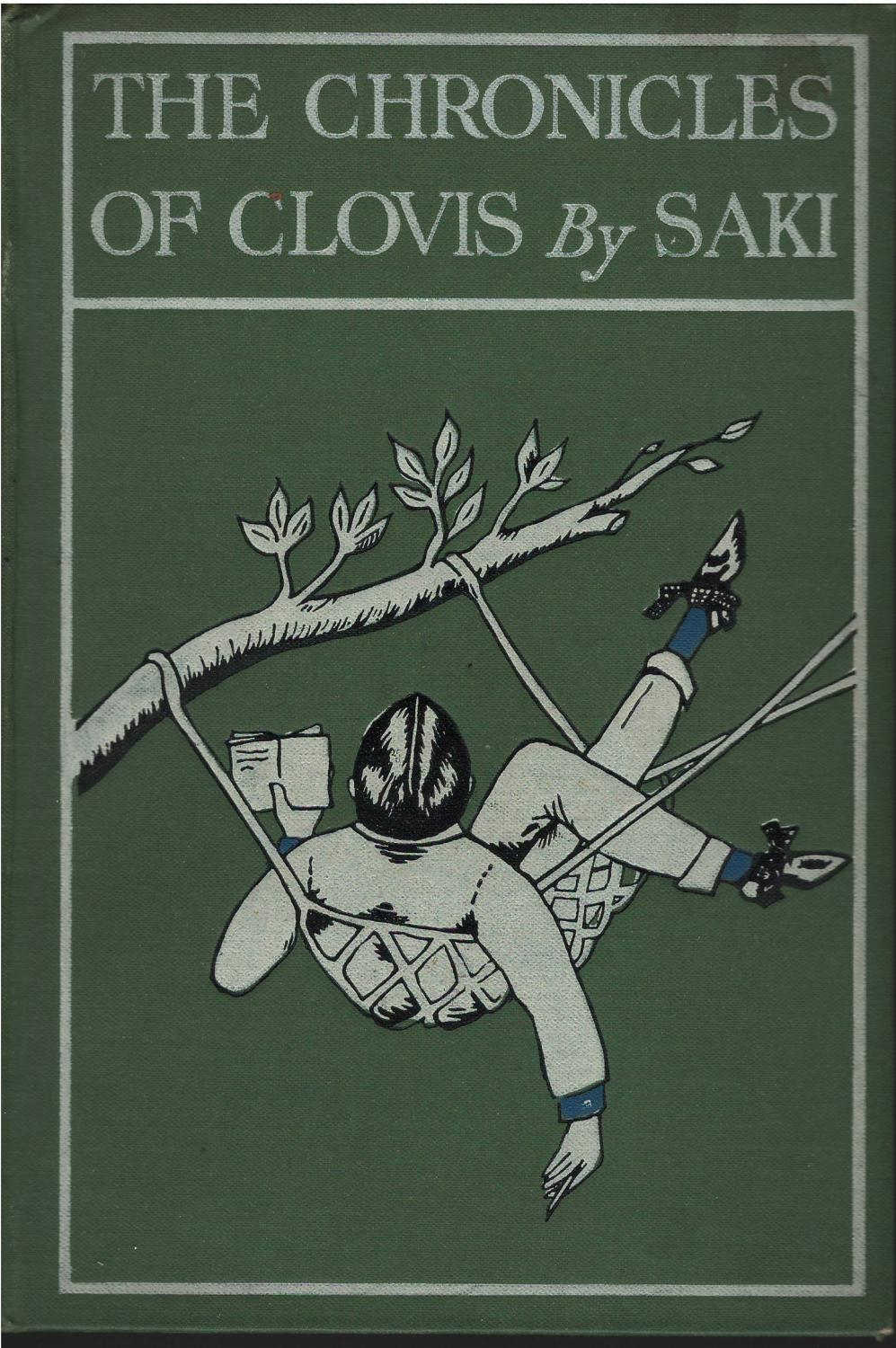
- First edition cover
- Author: Saki
- Language: English
- Genre: Short story collection
- Publisher: The Bodley Head
- Publication date: 1911
- Publication place: United Kingdom
- Text: The Chronicles of Clovis at Wikisource

The Chronicles of Clovis (1911) is the third volume of short stories by Saki, the pseudonym of Hector Hugh Munro. The collection features 28 stories, the majority of which had earlier appeared in various newspapers and magazines. Many of the stories follow privileged characters in Edwardian England. The collection contains some of Saki's most popular stories.

== Stories ==
- Esmé
- The Match-Maker
- Tobermory
- Mrs Packletide's Tiger
- The Stampeding of Lady Bastable
- The Background
- Hermann the Irascible – A Story of the Great Weep
- The Unrest-Cure
- The Jesting of Arlington Stringham
- Sredni Vashtar
- Adrian
- The Chaplet
- The Quest
- Wratislav
- The Easter Egg
- Filboid Studge, the Story of a Mouse that Helped
- The Music on the Hill
- The Story of St Vespaluus
- The Way to the Dairy
- The Peace Offering
- The Peace of Mowsle Barton
- The Talking-Out of Tarrington
- The Hounds of Fate
- The Recessional
- A Matter of Sentiment
- The Secret Sin of Septimus Brope
- "Ministers of Grace"
- The Remoulding of Groby Lington
- Acknowledgements

== Publication ==
The majority of the stories in The Chronicles of Clovis had previously appeared in newspapers and magazines: predominantly The Westminster Gazette, but also The Daily Mail, The Bystander and The Leinsters' Magazine. In February 1911, when Munro decided to issue them in book form, he turned, not to Methuen, the publisher of his two previous collections Reginald and Reginald in Russia, but to John Lane of The Bodley Head, whom he perhaps found more congenial as having previously published The Yellow Book and works by Oscar Wilde. Over the next few months, up to August 1911, he wrote five further short stories for inclusion in the volume and composed a dedication, also dated August 1911, to "the Lynx Kitten, with his reluctantly given consent". His, or its, identity is unknown. The author's name appeared as both Saki and H. H. Munro. Munro originally wanted to call the book "Tobermory and Other Sketches", then changed his mind in favour of "Beasts and Super-Beasts", which was eventually used as the title of his next collection. The final choice seems to have been the publisher's, and did not meet with Munro's approval. The Chronicles of Clovis was published in October 1911.

== Clovis Sangrail and Bertie van Tahn ==
The title character, Clovis Sangrail, is the protagonist of some stories and is hardly more than mentioned in others, Munro having been at some pains to bring a degree of unity to his book by revising some of his non-Clovis stories to give Clovis an incidental role. He also featured in some later stories by Munro. Clovis, the "Playboy of the Week-End World", is a snobbish, amoral, epicene, complacent young dandy, "an exquisite projection of adolescent ambition and...boyhood brutality" in George James Spears' words. He is the enemy of pretension, conformism and philistinism. He has antecedents in the works of Oscar Wilde and successors in the drawing-room comedies of Noël Coward. Another recurring character in the book is Bertie van Tahn, another rebellious, mischievous young man, though less likeable than Clovis. He was, Munro tells us, "so depraved at seventeen that he had long ago given up trying to be worse". Both are practical jokers, but Bertie always indulges in this practice for its own sake and without pity, whereas Clovis sees it as a kind of wild justice which may sometimes be employed on behalf of others. No woman in distress ever appeals to Clovis in vain.

== Reception ==
Interviewed by a journalist shortly after publication, Munro said that the critics had been kind, booksellers had done well, and friends had promised to read it if he would send them copies. In fact, the sales had been rather disappointing and the Times Literary Supplement had failed to notice it at all, though there were generally laudatory reviews in other journals. The Daily Chronicle called the author "more than clever". The Saturday Review conceded that "We can never be quite so fond, perhaps, of Clovis as we are of Reginald...but the art of tale-telling exhibited by Clovis is riper and sounder than was Reginald's." After favourably comparing various of the stories to the works of W. W. Jacobs, another master of humour and the macabre, and to F. Anstey, or unfavourably to Anthony Hope's Dolly Dialogues, it continued, "There remains about all the stories a pleasant 'Saki' flavour, of wit perverted and diverting, and of a remarkable epigrammatic power." The Spectator also compared the book to W. W. Jacobs, and judged that "Mr. Munro has an extraordinarily freakish fancy, a witty pen and great skill in depicting certain types of fashionable pleasure-hunters of the day. He is often extremely funny, but he is hardly ever genial", and it deplored "the unnecessary heartlessness of the author's reference to children."

The 1913 edition of Ernest A. Baker's Guide to the Best Fiction in English called it "extremely clever at absurd epigram and occasional parody". S. P. B. Mais, in 1920, said that it was generally seen as Munro's best and most characteristic work, writing that it displayed his

understanding of and love for animals, his almost inhuman aloofness from suffering, his first-hand knowledge of house-parties and hunting, his astounding success in choice of names for his characters, his gift for epigram, his love of practical jokes, his power of creating an atmosphere of pure horror, his Dickensian appreciation of food and the importance of its place in life, his eerie belief in rustic superstitions, and his neverfailing supply of bizarre and startling plots.

A. A. Milne, in an introduction to a 1926 edition of Clovis, singled out "The Background" and "Mrs Packletide's Tiger" as the most successful stories, showing "in addition to his own shining qualities, a compactness and a finish which he did not always achieve." George James Spears, in his 1963 study The Satire of Saki, wrote that the Clovis stories were Munro's most characteristic, most frequently anthologized, and by far his best. "Nowhere else does his work evince the extraordinary play of mind that we find here. Nowhere else does he display such force, such mastery over his medium." Munro's biographer A. J. Langguth observed in 1981 that in The Chronicles of Clovis "He had reached that degree of proficiency where the humor came less from his jokes than from the precision of each sentence. The reader laughs with delight at the absolute rightness to his language." The Oxford Companion to Edwardian Fiction, while noting with regret Munro's "snobbish preoccupation with the upper crust of the upper crust", affirmed that his "accounts of country-house parties, tiger-shoots, anarchist outrages and magical transformations are so wonderfully sly and heartless that it is difficult to resist them for long." Auberon Waugh believed that The Chronicles of Clovis displayed Saki's talent and illustrated his High Camp style, seeing in it neither heartlessness nor snobbery, but rather Saki's "rage and indignation against humanity".
