= Saki =

British writer (1870–1916)

Hector Hugh Munro
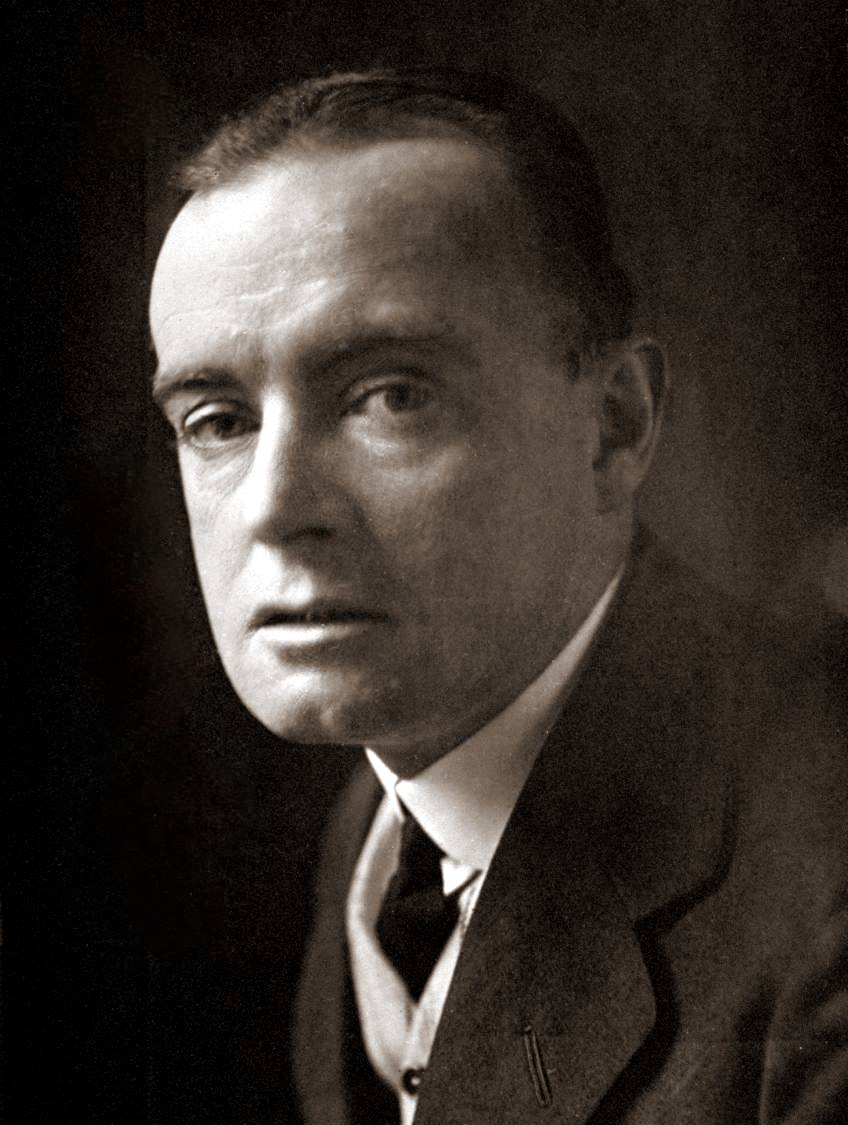
- Hector Hugh Munro by E. O. Hoppé (1913)
- Born: 18 December 1870; Akyab, Burma, British India (present-day Myanmar)
- Died: 14 November 1916 (aged 45); Beaumont-Hamel, France
- Occupations: Author, playwright
- Writing career
- Pen name: Saki
- Military career
- Allegiance: United Kingdom
- Branch: British Army
- Service years: 1914–1916
- Rank: Lance Sergeant
- Units: 22nd Battalion, Royal Fusiliers
- Conflicts: First World War: Battle of the Somme; Battle of the Ancre †

Hector Hugh Munro (18 December 1870 – 14 November 1916), popularly known by his pen name Saki and also frequently as H. H. Munro, was a British writer whose witty, mischievous and sometimes macabre stories satirise Edwardian society and culture. He is considered to be a master of the short story and is often compared to O. Henry and Dorothy Parker. Influenced by Oscar Wilde, Lewis Carroll and Rudyard Kipling, Munro himself influenced A. A. Milne, Noël Coward and P. G. Wodehouse.

Besides his short stories (which were first published in newspapers, as was customary at the time, and then collected into several volumes), Munro wrote a full-length play, The Watched Pot, in collaboration with Charles Maude; two one-act plays; a historical study, The Rise of the Russian Empire (the only book published under his own name); a short novel, The Unbearable Bassington; the episodic The Westminster Alice (a parliamentary parody of Alice in Wonderland); and When William Came, subtitled A Story of London Under the Hohenzollerns, a fantasy about a future German invasion and occupation of Britain.

== Life ==
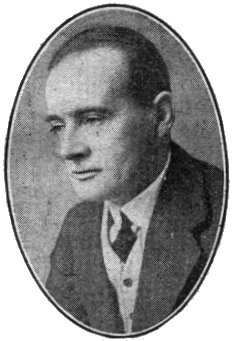
Photo from The War Illustrated, 31 July 1915

=== Early life ===
Hector Hugh Munro was born in Akyab (now Sittwe), British Burma, which was then part of British India. Saki was the son of Charles Augustus Munro, an Inspector General for the Indian Imperial Police, and his wife, Mary Frances Mercer (1843–1872), the daughter of Rear Admiral Samuel Mercer. Her nephew Cecil William Mercer became a novelist under the name Dornford Yates.

In 1872, on a home visit to England, Mary Munro was charged by a cow, and the shock caused her to miscarry. She never recovered and soon died.

After his wife's death Charles Munro sent his three children, Ethel Mary (born April 1868), Charles Arthur (born July 1869) and two-year-old Hector, home to England. The children were sent to Broadgate Villa, in Pilton near Barnstaple, North Devon, to be raised by their grandmother and paternal maiden aunts, Charlotte and Augusta, in a strict and puritanical household. It is said that his aunts were most likely models for some of his characters, notably the aunt in "The Lumber Room" and the guardian in "Sredni Vashtar": Munro's sister Ethel said that the aunt in "The Lumber Room" was an almost perfect portrait of Aunt Augusta. Munro and his siblings led slightly insular lives during their early years and were educated by governesses. At the age of 12 the young Hector Munro was educated at Pencarwick School in Exmouth and then as a boarder at Bedford School.

In 1887, after his retirement, his father returned from Burma and embarked upon a series of European travels with Hector and his siblings.

Hector followed his father in 1893 into the Indian Imperial Police and was posted to Burma, but successive bouts of fever caused his return home after only fifteen months.

=== Writing career ===
In 1896 he decided to move to London to make a living as a writer.

Munro started his writing career as a journalist for newspapers such as The Westminster Gazette, the Daily Express, The Morning Post, and magazines such as the Bystander and Outlook. His first book, The Rise of the Russian Empire, a historical study modelled upon Edward Gibbon's The Decline and Fall of the Roman Empire, appeared in 1900, under his real name, but proved to be something of a false start.

While writing The Rise of the Russian Empire, he made his first foray into short story writing and published a piece called "Dogged" in St Paul's on February 18, 1899 (Munro's sketch "The Achievement of the Cat" had appeared the day before in The Westminster Budget.) He then moved into the world of political satire in 1900 with a collaboration with Francis Carruthers Gould entitled "Alice in Westminster". Gould produced the sketches, and Munro wrote the text accompanying them, using the pen name "Saki" for the first time. The series lampooned political figures of the day (Alice in Downing Street begins with the memorable line, "'Have you ever seen an Ineptitude?'" – referring to a zoomorphised Arthur Balfour), and was published in the Liberal Westminster Gazette.

In 1902 he moved to The Morning Post, described as one of the "organs of intransigence" by Stephen Koss, to work as a foreign correspondent, first in the Balkans, and then in Russia, where he was witness to the 1905 revolution in St. Petersburg. He then went on to Paris, before returning to London in 1908, where "the agreeable life of a man of letters with a brilliant reputation awaited him". In the intervening period Reginald had been published in 1904, the stories having first appeared in The Westminster Gazette, and all this time he was writing sketches for The Morning Post, the Bystander and The Westminster Gazette. He kept a place in Mortimer Street, wrote, played bridge at the Cocoa Tree Club, and lived simply. Reginald in Russia appeared in 1910, The Chronicles of Clovis was published in 1911, and Beasts and Super-Beasts in 1914, along with other short stories that appeared in newspapers not published in collections in his lifetime.

He also produced two novels, The Unbearable Bassington (1912) and When William Came (1913).

=== Death ===
At the start of the First World War Munro was 43 and officially over-age to enlist, but he refused a commission and joined the 2nd King Edward's Horse as an ordinary trooper. He later transferred to the 22nd (Service) Battalion, Royal Fusiliers (Kensington), in which he was promoted to lance sergeant. More than once he returned to the battlefield when officially too sick or injured. In November 1916 he was sheltering in a shell crater near Beaumont-Hamel, France, during the Battle of the Ancre, when he was killed by a German sniper. According to several sources, his last words were "Put that bloody cigarette out!"

=== Legacy ===
Munro has no known grave. He is commemorated on Pier and Face 8C 9A and 16A of the Thiepval Memorial.

In 2003 English Heritage marked Munro's flat at 97 Mortimer Street, in Fitzrovia with a blue plaque.

After his death, his sister Ethel destroyed most of his papers and wrote her own account of their childhood, which appeared at the beginning of The Square Egg and Other Sketches (1924). Rothay Reynolds, a close friend, wrote a relatively lengthy memoir in The Toys of Peace (1919), but aside from this, the only other biographies of Munro are Saki: A Life of Hector Hugh Munro (1982) by A. J. Langguth, and The Unbearable Saki (2007) by Sandie Byrne. All later biographies have had to draw heavily upon Ethel's account of her brother's life.

In late 2020 two Saki stories, "The Optimist" (1912) and "Mrs. Pendercoet's Lost Identity" (1911), which had never been republished, collected, or noted in any academic publication on Saki, were rediscovered; they are now available online.

In 2021, Lora Sifurova, looking through the Morning Post and other London periodicals in Russian archives, rediscovered seven sketches and stories attributed to Munro or Saki.

In 2023, Bruce Gaston rediscovered a Clovis sketch, "The Romance of Business", published as part of an advertisement for Selfridge's in a 1914 issue of the Daily News and Leader.

=== Sexuality ===
Munro was homosexual at a time when in Britain sexual activity between men was a crime. The Cleveland Street scandal (1889), followed by the imprisonment of Oscar Wilde (1895), meant "that side of [Munro's] life had to be secret".

== Pen-name ==
The pen name "Saki" (Persian: sāqī, ساقى: 'cupbearer') is a reference to a figure in Edward Fitzgerald's translation of the Rubáiyát of Omar Khayyam. This is confirmed both by his friend and editor Rothay Reynolds and by his sister, Ethel Munro. The sāqī is a symbolic and erotic figure in both Arabic and Persian wine poetry.

== Selected works ==
Much of Saki's work contrasts the conventions and hypocrisies of Edwardian England with the ruthless but straightforward life-and-death struggles of nature. Writing in The Guardian to mark the centenary of Saki's death, Stephen Moss noted, "In many of his stories, stuffy authority figures are set against forces of nature—polecats, hyenas, tigers. Even if they are not eaten, the humans rarely have the best of it".

=== "The Interlopers" ===
"The Interlopers" is a story about two men, Georg Znaeym and Ulrich von Gradwitz, whose families have fought over a forest in the eastern Carpathian Mountains for generations. Ulrich's family legally owns the land and so considers Georg an interloper when he hunts in the forest. But Georg, believing that the forest rightfully belongs to his family, hunts there often and believes that Ulrich is the real interloper for trying to stop him. One winter night, Ulrich catches Georg hunting in the forest. Neither man can shoot the other without warning, as they would soil their family's honour, so they hesitate to acknowledge one another. In an "act of God", a tree branch suddenly falls on each of them, trapping them both under a log. Gradually they realise the futility of their quarrel, become friends and end the feud. They then call out for their men's assistance and, after a brief period, Ulrich makes out nine or ten figures approaching over a hill. The story ends with Ulrich's realization that the approaching figures on the hill are actually hungry wolves. The wolves who hunt in packs as opposed to rivalries, it seems, are the true owners of the forest, while both humans are interlopers.

=== "Gabriel-Ernest" ===
"Gabriel-Ernest" starts with a warning: "There is a wild beast in your woods …" Gabriel, a naked boy sunbathing by the river, is "adopted" by well-meaning townspeople. Lovely and charming, but also rather vague and distant, he seems bemused by his "benefactors." Asked how he managed by himself in the woods, he replies that he hunts "on four legs," which they take to mean that he has a dog. The climax comes when a small child disappears while walking home from Sunday school. A pursuit ensues, but Gabriel and the child disappear near a river. The only items found are Gabriel's clothes, and the two are never seen again. The story includes many of the author's favourite themes: good intentions gone awry, the banality of polite society, the attraction of the sinister, and the allure of the wild and the forbidden. There is also a recognition of basic decency, upheld when the story's protagonist 'flatly refuses' to subscribe to a Gabriel-Ernest memorial, for his supposedly gallant attempt to save a drowning child, and drowning himself, as well. Gabriel-Ernest was actually a werewolf who had eaten the child, then run off.

=== "The Schartz-Metterklume Method" ===
At a railway station an arrogant and overbearing woman, Mrs Quabarl, mistakes the mischievous Lady Carlotta, who has been inadvertently left behind by a train, for the governess, Miss Hope, whom she has been expecting, Miss Hope having erred about the date of her arrival. Lady Carlotta decides not to correct the mistake, acknowledges herself as Miss Hope, a proponent of "the Schartz-Metterklume method" of making children understand history by acting it out themselves, and chooses the Rape of the Sabine Women (exemplified by a washerwoman's two girls) as the first lesson. After creating chaos for two days, she departs, explaining that her delayed luggage will include a leopard cub.

=== "The Toys of Peace" ===
Preferring not to give her young sons toy soldiers or guns, and having taken away their toy depicting the Siege of Adrianople, Eleanor instructs her brother Harvey to give them innovative "peace toys" as an Easter present. When the packages are opened, young Bertie shouts "It's a fort!" and is disappointed when his uncle replies "It's a municipal dustbin." The boys are initially baffled as to how to obtain any enjoyment from models of a school of art and a public library, or from little figures of John Stuart Mill, Felicia Hemans and Sir John Herschel. Youthful inventiveness finds a way, however, as the boys combine their history lessons on Louis XIV with a lurid and violent play-story about the invasion of Britain and the storming of the Young Women's Christian Association. The end of the story has Harvey reporting failure to Eleanor, explaining "We have begun too late," not realising he was doomed to failure whenever he had begun.

=== "The Open Window" ===
Framton Nuttel, a nervous man, has come to stay in the country for his health. His sister, who thinks he should socialise while he is there, has given him letters of introduction to families in the neighbourhood whom she got to know during her stay. Framton goes to visit Mrs. Sappleton and, while waiting for her to come down, is entertained by her witty fifteen-year-old niece. The niece tells him that the French window is kept open, even though it is October, because Mrs. Sappleton believes that her husband and her brothers, who drowned in a bog three years before, will come back one day. When Mrs. Sappleton comes down she talks about her husband and her brothers, and how they are going to come back from shooting soon; Framton, believing that she is deranged, tries to distract her by explaining his health condition. Then, to his horror, Mrs. Sappleton points out that her husband and her brothers are coming, and he sees them walking towards the window with their dog. He thinks he is seeing ghosts and flees. Mrs. Sappleton cannot understand why he has run away and, at her husband and brothers' arrival, tells them about the odd man who has just left. The niece explains that Framton ran away because of the spaniel: he is afraid of dogs ever since he was hunted by a pack of stray dogs in India and had to spend a night in a newly dug grave with creatures grinning and foaming just above him. The last line summarises the situation, saying of the niece, "Romance at short notice was her speciality."

=== "The Unrest-Cure" ===
Saki's recurring hero Clovis Sangrail, a clever, mischievous young man, overhears the complacent middle-aged Huddle complaining of his own addiction to routine and aversion to change. Huddle's friend makes the wry suggestion that he needs an "unrest-cure" (the opposite of a rest cure), to be performed, if possible, in the home. Clovis takes it upon himself to "help" the man and his sister by involving them in an invented outrage (a supposed pogrom carried out by the local bishop) that will be a "blot on the twentieth century".

=== "Esmé" ===
A baroness tells Clovis a story about a hyena that she and her friend Constance encountered while out fox hunting. Later, the hyena follows them, stopping briefly to eat a gypsy child. Shortly after this, the hyena is killed by a motorcar. The baroness immediately claims the corpse as her beloved dog Esmé, and the guilty owner of the car gets his chauffeur to bury the animal and later sends her an emerald brooch to make up for her loss.

=== "Sredni Vashtar" ===
A sickly child named Conradin is raised by his aunt and guardian, Mrs De Ropp, who "would never... have confessed to herself that she disliked Conradin, though she might have been dimly aware that thwarting him 'for his good' was a duty which she did not find particularly irksome". Conradin rebels against his aunt and her choking authority. He invents a religion in which his polecat ferret is imagined as a vengeful deity, and Conradin prays that "Sredni Vashtar" will deliver retribution upon De Ropp. When De Ropp attempts to dispose of the animal, it attacks and kills her. The entire household is shocked and alarmed; Conradin calmly butters another piece of toast.

=== "Tobermory" ===
At a country-house party, one guest, Cornelius Appin, announces to the others that he has perfected a procedure for teaching animals human speech. He demonstrates this on his host's cat, Tobermory. Soon it is clear that animals are permitted to view and listen to many private things on the assumption that they will remain silent, such as the host Sir Wilfred's commentary on one guest's intelligence and the hope that she will buy his car, or the implied sexual activities of some of the other guests. The guests are angered, especially when Tobermory runs away to pursue a rival cat, but plans to poison him fail when Tobermory is instead killed by the rival cat. "An archangel ecstatically proclaiming the Millennium, and then finding that it clashed unpardonably with Henley and would have to be indefinitely postponed, could hardly have felt more crestfallen than Cornelius Appin at the reception of his wonderful achievement." Appin is killed shortly afterwards when attempting to teach an elephant in a zoo in Dresden to speak German. His fellow house party guest, Clovis Sangrail (Saki's recurring hero), remarks that if he was teaching "the poor beast" irregular German verbs, he deserved no pity.

=== "The Bull" ===
Tom Yorkfield, a farmer, receives a visit from his half-brother Laurence. Tom has no great liking for Laurence or respect for his profession as a painter of animals. Tom shows Laurence his prize bull and expects him to be impressed, but Laurence nonchalantly tells Tom that he has sold a painting of a different bull, which Tom has seen and does not like, for three hundred pounds. Tom is angry that a mere picture of a bull should be worth more than his real bull. This and Laurence's condescending attitude give him the urge to strike him. Laurence, running away across the field, is attacked by the bull, but is saved by Tom from serious injury. Tom, looking after Laurence as he recovers, feels no more rancour because he knows that, however valuable Laurence's painting might be, only a real bull like his can attack someone.

=== "The East Wing" ===
This is a "rediscovered" short story that was previously cited as a play. A house party is beset by a fire in the middle of the night in the east wing of the house. Begged by their hostess to save "my poor darling Eva—Eva of the golden hair," Lucien demurs, on the grounds that he has never even met her. It is only on discovering that Eva is not a flesh-and-blood daughter but Mrs Gramplain's painting of the daughter she wished that she had had, and which she has faithfully updated with the passing years, that Lucien declares a willingness to forfeit his life to rescue her, since "death in this case is more beautiful," a sentiment endorsed by the Major. As the two men disappear into the blaze, Mrs Gramplain recollects that she "sent Eva to Exeter to be cleaned". The two men have lost their lives for nothing.

== Publications ==
- 1899 "Dogged" (short story, ascribed to H. H. M., in St. Paul's, 18 February)
- 1900 The Rise of the Russian Empire (history)
- 1902 "The Woman Who Never Should" (political sketch in The Westminster Gazette, 22 July)
- 1902 The Not So Stories (political sketches in The Westminster Annual)
- 1902 The Westminster Alice (political sketches with illustrations by F. Carruthers Gould)
- 1904 Reginald (short stories)
- 1910 Reginald in Russia (short stories)
- 1911 The Chronicles of Clovis (short stories)
- 1912 The Unbearable Bassington (novel)
- 1913 When William Came (novel)
- 1914 Beasts and Super-Beasts (short stories, including "The Lumber-Room")
- 1914 "The East Wing" (short story, in Lucas's Annual / Methuen's Annual)

Posthumous publications

- 1919 The Toys of Peace (short stories)
- 1924 The Square Egg and Other Sketches (short stories)
- 1924 The Watched Pot (play, co-authored with Charles Maude)
- 1926–27 The Works of Saki (8 volumes)
- 1930 The Complete Short Stories of Saki
- 1933 The Complete Novels and Plays of Saki (including The Westminster Alice)
- 1934 The Miracle-Merchant (in One-Act Plays for Stage and Study 8)
- 1950 The Best of Saki (edited by Graham Greene)
- 1963 The Bodley Head Saki
- 1976 The Complete Saki
- 1976 Short Stories (edited by John Letts)
- 1976 The Best of Saki (selected and with an introduction by Tom Sharpe)
- 1981 Six previously uncollected stories in Saki, a biography by A. J. Langguth
- 1988 Saki: The Complete Saki
- 1995 The Secret Sin of Septimus Brope, and Other Stories
- 2006 A Shot in the Dark (includes 10 previously uncollected stories)
- 2010 Improper Stories, Daunt Books (18 short stories)
- 2016 Alice Wants to Know (limited edition reprint of the final instalment of The Westminster Alice, originally published in Picture Politics, but not included in the collected edition).
- 2023 A Little Red Book of Wit & Shudders Borderlands Press

== Radio ==
The 5th broadcast of Orson Welles' series for CBS Radio, The Mercury Theatre on the Air, from 8 August 1938, dramatises three short stories rather than one long story. The second of the three stories is "The Open Window."

"The Open Window" is also adapted (by John Allen) in the 1962 Golden Records release Alfred Hitchcock Presents: Ghost Stories for Young People, a record album of six ghost stories for children.

Tobermory, The Interlopers, Sredni Vashtar, Gabriel Ernest and Mrs Packletide's Tiger were restaged in a modern day wealthy gated-community by BBC as Beasts on the Lawn.

== Television ==
A dramatisation of "The Schartz-Metterklume Method" was an episode in the series Alfred Hitchcock Presents in 1960.

Saki: The Improper Stories of H. H. Munro (a reference to the ending of "The Story Teller") was an eight-part series produced by Philip Mackie for Granada Television in 1962. Actors involved included Mark Burns as Clovis, Fenella Fielding as Mary Drakmanton, Heather Chasen as Agnes Huddle, Richard Vernon as the Major, Rosamund Greenwood as Veronique and Martita Hunt as Lady Bastable.

Jonathan Pryce read five short stories, “The Music on the Hill”, “Sredni Vashtar”, “The Penance”, “Gabriel-Ernest” and “The Hounds of Fate” as part of the British children's supernatural television series Spine Chillers broadcast by BBC1 in 1980.

A dramatisation of "The Open Window" was an episode in the series Tales of the Unexpected in 1984. The same story was also adapted as "Ek Khula Hua Darwaza" by Shyam Benegal as an episode in the 1986 Indian anthology television series Katha Sagar, which also included the episode "Saboon Ki Tikiya" an adaptation of Munro's "Dusk" by Benegal.

Who Killed Mrs De Ropp?, a BBC TV production in 2007, starring Ben Daniels and Gemma Jones, showcased three of Saki's short stories, "The Storyteller", "The Lumber Room" and "Sredni Vashtar".

== Short films ==
A 2004 short film, The Open Doors, adapted ”The Open Window”; directed by James Rogan it starred Michael Sheen as Framton Nuttell, Charlotte Ritchie as Vera and Cherie Lunghi as Mrs. Sappleton.

== Theatre ==
- The Playboy of the Week-End World (1977) by Emlyn Williams, adapts 16 of Saki's stories.
- Wolves at the Window (2008) by Toby Davies, adapts 12 of Saki's stories.
- Saki Shorts (2003) is a musical based on nine stories by Saki, with music, book and lyrics by John Gould and Dominic McChesney.
- Miracles at Short Notice (2011) by James Lark is another musical based on short stories by Saki.
- Life According to Saki (2016) by Katherine Rundell is a play inspired by the life and work of Saki.

== Literary criticism and biography ==
- "Mappining London: Urban Participation in Sakian Satire" —by Lorene Mae Birden. Literary criticism focusing on the role of London.
- "People Dined Against Each Other: Social Practices in Sakian Satire" —by Lorene Mae Birden. Literary criticism focusing on social mannerisms.
- The Satire of Saki by George James Spears—A 127-page book encompassing a dissection of satire in Saki's works, with a bibliography and overview of all of Saki's works in relation to satire.
- Biography by Ethel M. Munro—A brief biography written by Saki's sister.
- Saki: A Life of Hector Hugh Munro by A. J. Langguth—Includes six uncollected stories and various photographs.
- Pamela M. Pringle 'Wolves by Jamrach': the Elusive Undercurrents in Saki's Short Stories (unpublished M.Litt. dissertation, University of Aberdeen, 1993).
- "An Asp Lurking in An Apple-Charlotte: Animal Violence in Saki's The Chronicles of Clovis" by Joseph S. Salemi – Literary criticism about the recurrence of animals in The Chronicles of Clovis, suggesting that the animals represent the characters' primal instincts and true vicious mannerisms. Available in Student Research Center of EbscoHost Database.
- "The Unrest Cure According to Lawrence, Saki, and Lewis" by Christopher Lane, Modernism/modernity 11.4 (2004): 769–96
- "Saki/Munro: Savage Propensities; or, The Jungle-Boy in the Drawing-room" by Christopher Lane, in The Ruling Passion (Duke University Press, 1995), pp. 212–28
- Stern, Simon (1994). "Saki's Attitude". GLQ: A Journal of Lesbian and Gay Studies. 1 (3): 275–98. doi:10.1215/10642684-1-3-275. OCLC 42671765.
- Van Leer, David (1995). The queening of America: gay culture in straight society. Routledge. pp. 31–37. ISBN 978-0-415-90336-3.
- Sandie Byrne, Dr (2007). The unbearable Saki: the work of H. H. Munro. Oxford. ISBN 978-0-19-922605-4. OCLC 163312071.
- Christopher Hitchens (June 2008), Where the Wild Things Are—Review of The Unbearable Saki in Atlantic Monthly
- Brian Gibson (2014). Reading Saki: The Fiction of H.H. Munro. McFarland. ISBN 978-0-786-47949-8.
- Oliver Soden (2026). Super-Beast: The Short Story of Saki. Weidenfeld & Nicolson. ISBN 978-1-399-62585-2.
