= To Venus in Five Seconds =

1897 novel by Fred T. Jane

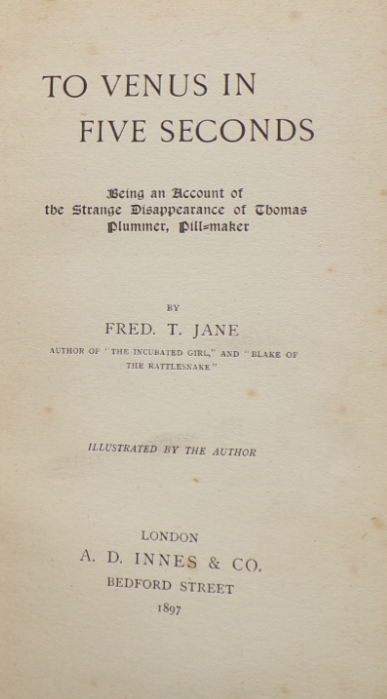
- Title page for To Venus in Five Seconds (1897)
- Author: Fred T. Jane
- Illustrator: Fred T. Jane
- Language: English
- Genre: Satire; Science fiction Speculative fiction
- Publisher: A. D. Innes
- Publication date: 1897
- Publication place: United Kingdom
- Media type: Print (Hardcover)
- Pages: 130 pp.

To Venus in Five Seconds: An Account of the Strange Disappearance of Thomas Plummer, Pillmaker is a science fiction satire written by English author Fred T. Jane, the author of the original Jane's Fighting Ships and the founder of what would in time become the Jane's Information Group. Published in 1897, the novel pokes fun at several of the main subgenres of scientific romance that had become popular in the final years of the nineteenth century.

== Synopsis ==
The hero of Jane's story is a superb physical specimen of English manhood named Thomas Plummer. He is being sent to medical school by his father, a medical entrepreneur (pill manufacturer), despite the fact that the younger Plummer is not very bright. At medical school Plummer meets a young, dark-skinned woman called Miss Zumeena. The young woman invites him to tea at her summer house, which is, oddly, full of machinery. A few seconds later, she informs the young Englishman that he is now on Venus. The machinery in Zumeena's gazebo operates a matter transmitter that allows almost instantaneous transport between the two planets.

Closer to the Sun than Earth, Venus is hot and jungle-covered; the glare of the Sun both blinds the eyes and affects the mind. The planet is inhabited by two developed species, the human Sutenraa and the decidedly non-human Thotheen. Zumeena is a Sutenraa, a people who arrived in Central America from ancient Egypt. These highly advanced ancients developed a matter transmitter in their distant past, and used it to travel back and forth between the pyramids of Egypt and Central America; in the process they sometimes found themselves on Venus, apparently due to interference with the similar matter transmitter technology of the Thotheen. The latter are the dominant indigenous species of the planet; Jane both describes and draws Thotheen as a cross between a small elephant and a large horse-fly.

Some of the Central-American/Egyptians settled on Venus to form a growing human community; they often served as physicians to the Thotheen. At the time of Plummer's arrival on Venus, the long co-existence between the two species is breaking down; Zumeena predicts that conflict will soon erupt between them, which the Thotheen will win due to their superior intelligence. Plummer also learns that he has been brought to Venus as a subject for vivisection, because of his excellent physique. Zumeena has taken a fancy to him, though; she makes romantic advances to him, which he spurns. She reluctantly consigns him to vivisection, though she allows him the option of anesthesia.

Plummer meets two other English people on Venus, a young woman named Phyllis Alson and a clergyman. He and Phyllis quickly fall in love; the convenient clergyman marries them. War breaks out, first a civil war among the Thotheen and then the conflict between the Thotheen and Sutenraa anticipated by Zumeena. Plummer and Phyllis escape to Earth with Zumeena (the clergyman is by now dead) via matter transmitter; they land on the pinnacle of the Great Pyramid of Giza. There, Plummer finds one of his father's agents stenciling an advertisement in white paint. The young English couple return home, while Zumeena goes south to become a "goddess" for some primitive people.

== Themes ==
Jane spent much of the 1890s illustrating popular novels of speculative fiction, including Edgar Fawcett's Hartmann the Anarchist (1893) and books by George Griffith. When he turned to writing his own novels, Jane parodied the types of fiction he illustrated—what were then called "scientific romances," and the novels of future war that were such a characteristic feature of popular literature in Britain in the decades before World War I—books like Griffith's The Angel of the Revolution (1893) and Olga Romanoff (1894). The title of Jane's book both pokes fun and alludes to other works of romances of travel like Jules Verne's From The Earth To The Moon, Direct Course In 97 Hours 20 Minutes (1865), Around The Moon (1870), Around The World In Eighty Days (1873), and their imitations.

To Venus in Five Seconds features one of the earliest uses of the matter transmitter for interplanetary travel" in science fiction. Jane does not spend much effort on explaining how a matter transmitter might actually work; the technology is merely a given, like the titular device in H. G. Wells' The Time Machine (1895). The depiction of Venus incorporates another subgenre of fantastic fiction of Jane's era, books on Egypt, the pyramids, and related matters. The book also includes references to another popular subgenre of Victorian fantastic fiction, the "lost world" or "lost race" stories like H. Rider Haggard's She (1886) and its many imitations.

The work has been called "the most readable and entertaining of Jane's books". Jane wrote other works of speculative fiction, notably The Incubated Girl (1896) and The Violet Flame (1899).
