= Teleportation =

Science fiction transportation concept

Teleportation is the hypothetical transfer of matter or energy from one point to another without traversing the physical space between them. It is a common subject in science fiction and fantasy literature. Teleportation is often paired with time travel, being that the traveling between the two points takes an unknown period of time, sometimes being immediate. An apport is a similar phenomenon featured in parapsychology and spiritualism.

There is no known physical mechanism that would allow for teleportation. Some scientific papers and media articles describe "quantum teleportation", a scheme for quantum information transfer, which does not allow for faster-than-light communication.

== Etymology ==
The use of the term teleport to describe the hypothetical movement of material objects between one place and another without physically traversing the distance between them has been documented as early as 1878.

American writer Charles Fort is credited with having coined the word teleportation in 1931 to describe the strange disappearances and appearances of anomalies, which he suggested may be connected. As in the earlier usage, he joined the Greek prefix tele- (meaning "remote") to the root of the Latin verb portare (meaning "to carry"). Fort's first formal use of the word occurred in the second chapter of his 1931 book Lo!:

Mostly in this book I shall specialize upon indications that there exists a transportory force that I shall call Teleportation. I shall be accused of having assembled lies, yarns, hoaxes, and superstitions. To some degree I think so, myself. To some degree, I do not. I offer the data.

== Cultural references ==
=== Fiction ===
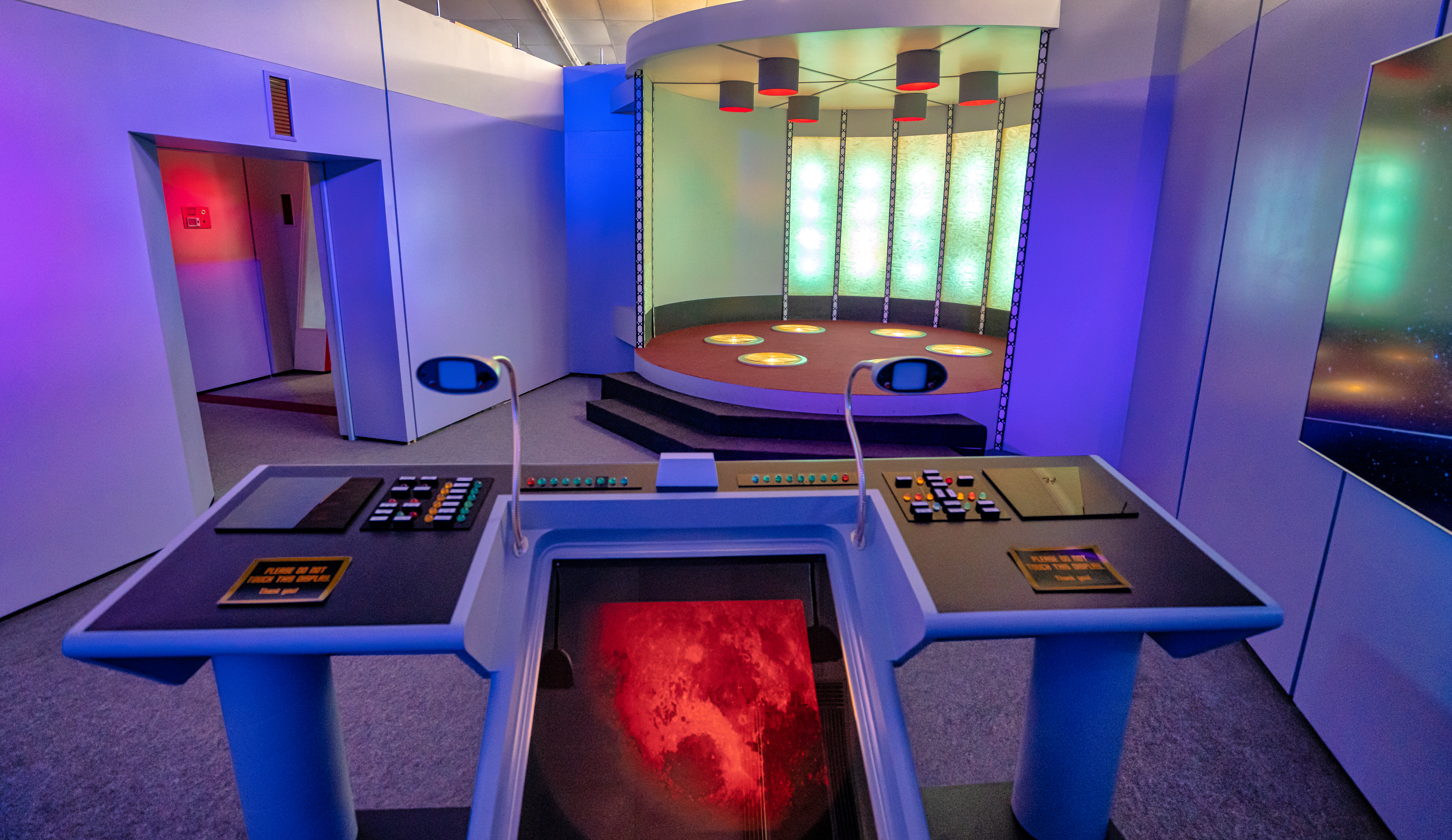
A mockup of the transporter room from Star Trek: The Original Series

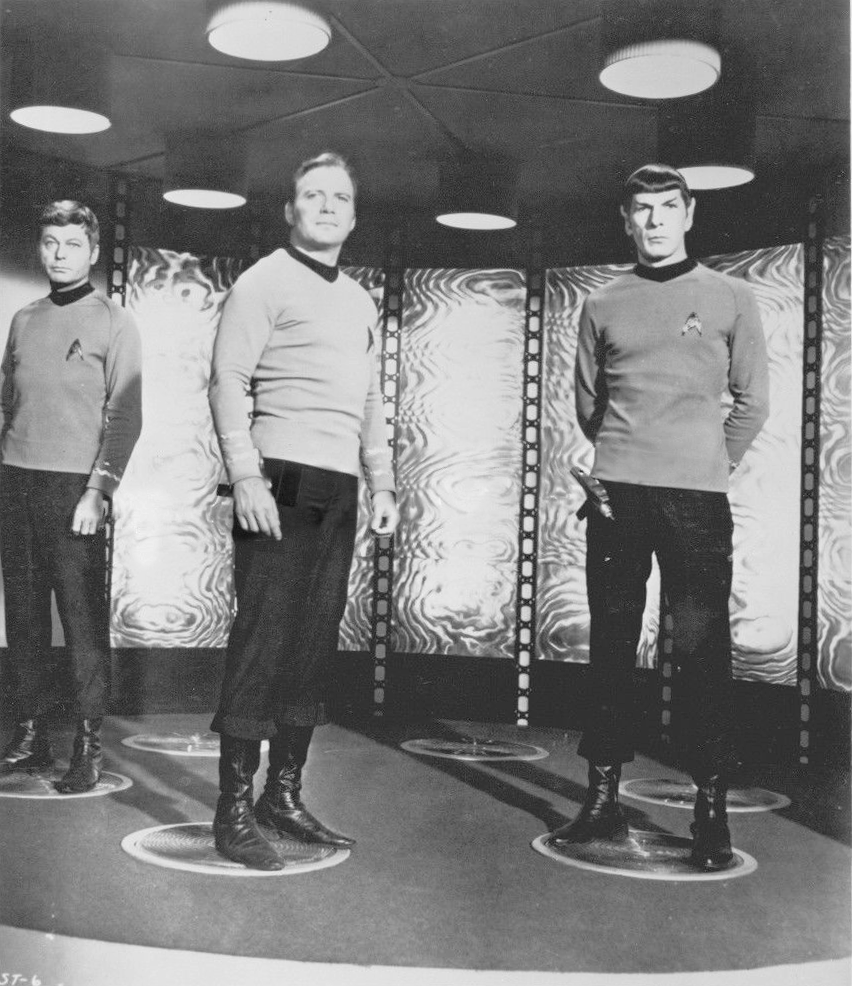
McCoy, Kirk and Spock in the Star Trek transporter room

Teleportation is a common subject in science fiction literature, film, video games, and television. The use of matter transmitters in science fiction originated at least as early as the 19th century. An early example of scientific teleportation (as opposed to magical or spiritual teleportation) is found in the 1897 novel To Venus in Five Seconds by Fred T. Jane. Jane's protagonist is transported from Earth via a gazebo containing strange machinery to Venus, hence the title.

The earliest recorded story of a "matter transmitter" was Edward Page Mitchell's "The Man Without a Body" in 1877.

=== Live performance ===
Teleportation illusions have featured in live performances throughout history, often under the fiction of miracles, psychic phenomenon, or magic. The cups and balls trick has been performed since 3 BC and can involve balls vanishing, reappearing, teleporting and transposing (objects in two locations interchanging places). A common trick of close-up magic is the apparent teleportation of a small object, such as a marked playing card, which can involve sleight-of-hand, misdirection, and pickpocketing. Magic shows were popular entertainments at fairs in the 18th century and moved into permanent theatres in the mid-19th century. Theatres provided greater control of the environment and viewing angles for more elaborate illusions, and teleportation tricks grew in scale and ambition. To increase audience excitement, the teleportation illusion could be conducted under the theme of a predicament escape. Magic shows achieved widespread success during the Golden Age of Magic in the late 19th and early 20th centuries.

== Quantum teleportation ==
Quantum teleportation is distinct from regular teleportation, as it does not transfer matter from one place to another, but rather transmits the quantum information necessary to prepare a (microscopic) target system in the same quantum state as the source system. The scheme was named quantum "teleportation", because certain properties of the source system are recreated in the target system without any apparent quantum information carrier propagating between the two.

In 1993, Bennett et al proposed that a quantum state of a particle could be transferred to another distant particle, without moving the two particles at all. This is called quantum state teleportation. There are many following theoretical and experimental papers published.

In 2008, M. Hotta proposed that it may be possible to teleport energy by exploiting quantum energy fluctuations of an entangled vacuum state of a quantum field. In 2023, quantum energy teleportation was observed and recorded by Kazuki Ikeda for the first-time across microscopic distances using IBM superconducting computers that are used for quantum computing.

In 2014, researcher Ronald Hanson and colleagues from the Technical University Delft in the Netherlands, demonstrated the teleportation of information between two entangled quantumbits three metres apart.

A generalization of quantum mechanics suggests particles could be teleported from one place to another. This is called particle teleportation. With this concept, superconductivity can be viewed as the teleportation of some electrons in the superconductor and superfluidity as the teleportation of some of the atoms in the cellular tube. Further analysis shows that the teleportation time increases with the square root of mass and longer teleportation times require sustained quantum coherence. While particle teleportation may be feasible for an electron, a proton may not be feasible.

== Philosophy ==
Philosopher Derek Parfit used teleportation in his teletransportation paradox.

== See also ==
- 1593 transported soldier legend
- Apport (paranormal)
- Bilocation
- Materialization (paranormal)
- Philadelphia experiment
- Quantum teleportation
- Teletransportation paradox
- Wormhole
