= The Angel of the Revolution =

1893 novel by George Griffith

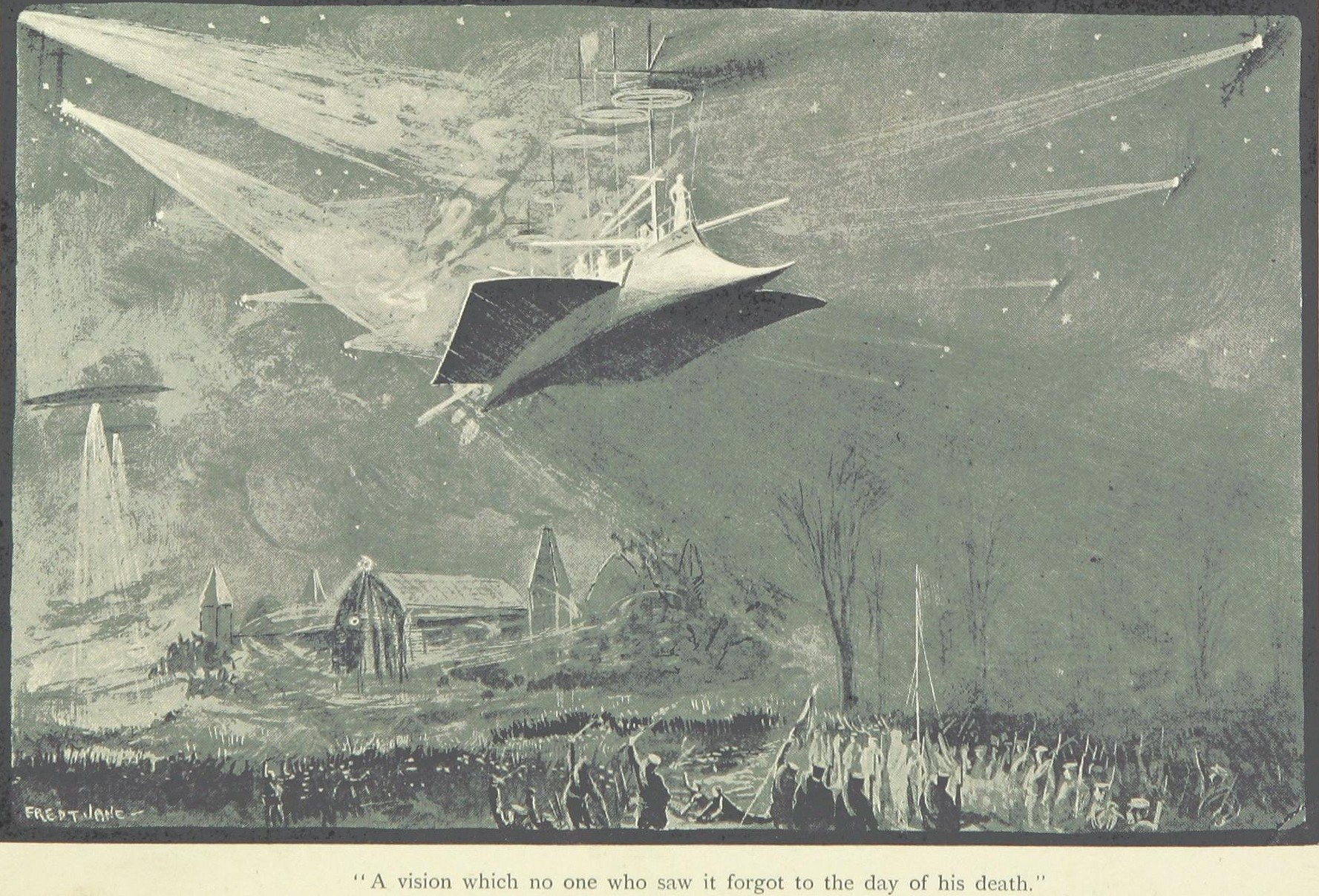
- Illustration by Fred T. Jane, page 284 of The Angel of the Revolution
- Author: George Griffith
- Original title: The Angel of the Revolution: A Tale of the Coming Terror
- Language: English
- Genre: science fiction
- Set in: 1903–1905
- Publisher: Pearson's Weekly
- Publication place: UK
- Media type: book
- Followed by: Olga Romanoff

The Angel of the Revolution: A Tale of the Coming Terror (1893) is a science fiction novel by the English writer George Griffith. It was his first published novel and remains his most famous work. It was first published in Pearson's Weekly and was prompted by the success of "The Great War of 1892" in Black and White magazine, which was itself inspired by The Battle of Dorking.

A lurid mix of Jules Verne's futuristic air warfare fantasies and the utopian visions of News from Nowhere, and a precursor of H. G. Wells' future The War in the Air and the war invasion literature of George Tomkyns Chesney and his imitators, it tells the tale of a group of self-styled 'terrorists' who conquer the world through airship warfare. Led by a crippled, brilliant Russian Jew and his daughter, the 'angel' Natasha, 'The Brotherhood of Freedom' establish a 'pax aeronautica' over the earth after a young inventor masters the technology of flight in 1903. Protagonist Richard Arnold falls in love with Natasha and joins in her war against established society in general and the Russian tsar in particular.

A sequel, The Syren of the Skies, appeared in Pearson's Weekly and was published in book form as Olga Romanoff in 1894.

== Plot ==
The story begins on September 3, 1903, with twenty-six-year-old Richard Arnold, a scientist devoted to the invention of a flying machine, finally realizing his dream in the form of an air-ship that could fly on its own. Having given all his resources to the project, Arnold didn't have enough money to live on. He wandered the streets of London, until a stranger overheard his muttering about a flying machine that he wouldn't want to be used by tyrants or for war and destruction. The stranger introduced himself as Maurice Colston, and the two men soon realized they shared a distaste for autocracy and the status quo, feeling "at war with Society".

With Colston's assistance, Arnold met other heads of the "Brotherhood of Freedom", a revolutionary organization of anarchists, nihilists, and socialists bent on ending the society of oppression and misery. Agreeing with their cause, he put his knowledge and skills at their disposal, while retaining control of his invention. During the meeting he was introduced to Natasha, the Angel of the Revolution, and immediately fell in love with her. However, the cause was of far greater importance, and romance had to wait. Equipped by the Brotherhood with everything he needed, Arnold finished the construction of the world's first air-ship: the Ariel.

The air-ship was first used to rescue Natasha in March 1904. She had been arrested by Russian government agents about the time Ariel was built. On their flight towards the designated town in Russia where they would attempt to rescue Natasha, the "Terrorists" - as everyone called the members of this secret order - decided to show the world the air-ship's destructive power. The strongest European fortress, Kronstadt, on an island in the Finnish Gulf, was selected as a target. Within minutes, the weapons of Ariel left the fortress in ruins. With the air-ship and the Brotherhood's many agents, the Terrorists managed to rescue Natasha before the convoy of political prisoners reached Siberia. News of the mysterious air vessel and its power travelled all over the Western world, causing fear and panic in the ranks of both common people and the upper classes.

Meanwhile, after forty years of peace, European powers were readying for the inevitable final clash: plans were being laid down, treaties made and tested, armies equipped and mobilized. Attempting to control the coming war and make it the war to end all wars, Terrorists set off to find suitable headquarters from which they could send orders and organize their own troops without being distracted. A region in the midst of Africa, called Aerial by the English explorers who found it, was perfect. The region was a valley paradise surrounded by high mountains, unreachable by any conventional vessel - except the air-ship. There, Arnold and Natasha finally swore their love to each other, agreeing to wait until the war to end all wars had ended and eternal peace restored to Earth. In the meantime, the Terrorists built eleven more air-ships identical to Ariel and the twelfth - a flagship - twice the size, with twice the firepower.

As Europe sank into war between the Anglo-Teutonic Alliance (led by Britain, Germany and Austria) and the Franco-Slavonian League (led by Russia, France and Italy), war proved to be more devastating than ever, especially with the Russians and French employing their new war-balloons. The balloons, although in many ways inferior to Terrorists' air-ships, destroyed fort after fort, city after city, and secured numerous victories for the Franco-Slavonian League. Even though they could only drop dynamite from above, war-balloons were causing such havoc that the German and Austrian armies were losing land fast. In the early weeks of the war, the Terrorists tried to remain neutral, occasionally appearing here and there and settling their own issues with involved sides or their weapons of war, pushing their own well-planned agenda slowly but steadily. Still, because of treason in their own ranks, the Terrorists lost an air-ship to the Russians. Pursuing the vessel in an attempt to either retrieve or destroy it, the Terrorists finally recaptured the lost air-ship. They witnessed the destructive power that the Franco-Slavonian League had at its disposal, and knew that Britain and her allies had no chance of winning such a war.

As war drew closer to British shores, with Germany falling completely under the power of the Russian tsar, the Terrorists had more important work to finish. The head of the American section of the Brotherhood, Michael Roburoff, asked for Natasha's hand, and to the utter dismay of Natasha and Arnold, Natasha's father, Natas, sent her to America. The lovers did not try to challenge him, accepting this, while being sure that there was reason behind Natas' plan. It turned out that Roburoff was blackmailing Natas: he had proposed to exchange the allegiance of the American section for Natasha's hand. By the will of Natas, Roburoff was shot dead by Natasha when he received her in his house in America, and the American section gained a new leadership, ready for the revolution.

On the night of 4 October 1904, an order was passed to millions of secret followers of the Brotherhood in America, and the next day production completely stopped. Streets and institutions were taken by organized masses and the government was overthrown. The new government arrested capitalists who had schemed to use the European conflict for profit by supplying the Franco-Slavonian League. With a threat of air-ships and troops devoted to the Brotherhood's Cause, the Terrorists proclaimed a new Anglo-Saxon Federation. Soon Canada faced the same destiny and the Terrorists turned to Britain with a proposal: face utter destruction by Russian and French forces, or become a part of the Federation. The British government refused the proposal, willing to fight to the bitter end and still hoping that the islands could not be taken by any continental army.

Much to their surprise, with the aid of war-balloons, the Franco-Slavonian League cut all oversea trade to and from Britain, and arranged a successful landing of troops on British soil, aiming to take London. Under siege and with no allies left, Britain fought furiously, but were left no other choice but to accept a new proposal from the Terrorists. At the height of his power, the Russian tsar already looked forward to Britain's surrender and was taken by surprise as the new army arose in Britain: the army called by the Terrorists, just as they were in America. Even greater was the tsar's surprise when he realized that terrorists had thousands of their men in his own ranks. Aided with air-ships and troops from American section, the Brotherhood - now acting as the Anglo-Saxon Federation - swiftly destroyed almost all Russian, French and Italian troops, forcing a surrender of all the armies and ending the world war in just two days.

On 9 May, a conference was held to decide the future of the Western world. With air-ships and the power of millions of people under their Federation's banner, the Terrorists easily convinced the European leaders that the only way to stop destruction was to make wars impossible to fight. Thus, disarmament of all standing armies was enacted, with police being the only force to keep order. However, in the East, Buddhist and Muslim people fought each other without knowing what had happened in Europe. After defeating their opponents, the Muslims moved to Turkey in an attempt to conquer the Western world. Met with the tremendous destructive power of the Federation, they admitted defeat and accepted the conditions of surrender from the Terrorists. The conditions were the same for all nations, now united under the banner of the Federation, the all-powerful peace force. Removing all unjust and confusing national laws, and confiscating for the state all land that was not directly used for production, the Federation achieved order for the common people, with no fear of future wars. The Terrorists finally succeeded and concluded their war to end all wars.

== History ==
George Griffith (1857–1906) was a teacher-turned-writer who in 1890 was out of a job after losing a libel case and being forced to shut down his publication. A friend of Griffith's wrote him a letter of introduction to publisher C. Arthur Pearson. He got a job at the newly founded Pearson's Weekly, initially tasked by editor Peter Keary with writing addresses on envelopes for the magazine's competitions. He made a good impression on Keary through his skill as a conversationalist, largely owing to his background travelling the world, and was soon promoted to columnist. He carried on in this capacity for the rest of the decade.

The future war genre had been popular since the publication of George Tomkyns Chesney's novella "The Battle of Dorking" (1871), and rival magazine Black & White had just had a major success in the genre with the serialized novel The Great War of 1892 (1892) by Philip Howard Colomb. Pearson wanted to capitalize on both of these trends; Pearson's Weekly had from the start published short stories, and the staff discussed internally who could try their hand at a future-war serial, to which Griffith volunteered. He brought in a synopsis the following day, and got the assignment; the synopsis was published in Pearson's Weekly on 14 January 1893, before the story itself had been written. The next week's edition saw the publication of the first of 39 weekly instalments of Griffith's story, The Angel of the Revolution. The name of the author was not revealed until the final issue on 14 October 1893. The serial received positive reviews and the magazine saw a sharp increase in number of issues sold. During the serialization one of Griffith's sons was born and named Alan Arnold Griffith, after two characters in The Angel of the Revolution.

The London-based Tower Publishing Company quickly secured the book rights to The Angel of the Revolution, publishing an abridged hardcover edition in October 1893. The book version was likewise a success, receiving rave reviews and becoming a bestseller; it was printed in at least eleven editions, and a review in The Pelican declared Griffith to be "a second Jules Verne". Pearson responded by signing a contract of exclusivity with Griffith and providing him with a secretary for dictation. The Angel of the Revolution was not, however, published in the United States in either book or serial format. Due to anti-American sentiments expressed in Griffith's work—in the story, the Constitution of the United States is physically destroyed and it is stated that "there were few who in their hearts did not believe the Republic to be a colossal fraud", for instance—US publishers wanted nothing to do with him or his stories. During his lifetime, none of Griffith's books were published in the US, and it would not be until 1902 that the first and only serial of his was published in a US magazine.

The success of The Angel of the Revolution quickly led to the announcement of a sequel, The Syren of the Skies, in the 23 December 1893 issue of Pearson's Weekly. It was serialized in 32 instalments from 30 December 1893 to 4 August 1894, and published in hardcover format by Tower in November 1894 under the title Olga Romanoff.

== Reception ==
Griffith, whose plot purports to turn the world upside down, leaves a great many things in what he considered, after all, to be their right places. The Czar ends down the silver mines, but less tyrannical monarchs sit safe and sound on their thrones, while the superiority of Britain is affirmed.

— Barbara Arnett Melchiori, Terrorism in the Late Victorian Novel

Darko Suvin opines that the book is Griffith's best, but nevertheless "marred by slipshod haste, racist chauvinism, and melodramatic sensationalism". It is characterised by what Michael Moorcock called its "controlled imaginative flight, its essentially socialist message, [and] a strong dose [of] romanticism". Robert Godwin describes it as "a Victorian Tom Clancy novel, replete with jingoistic overtones".

== See also ==
- Invasion literature
