= Olga Romanoff =

1894 novel by George Griffith

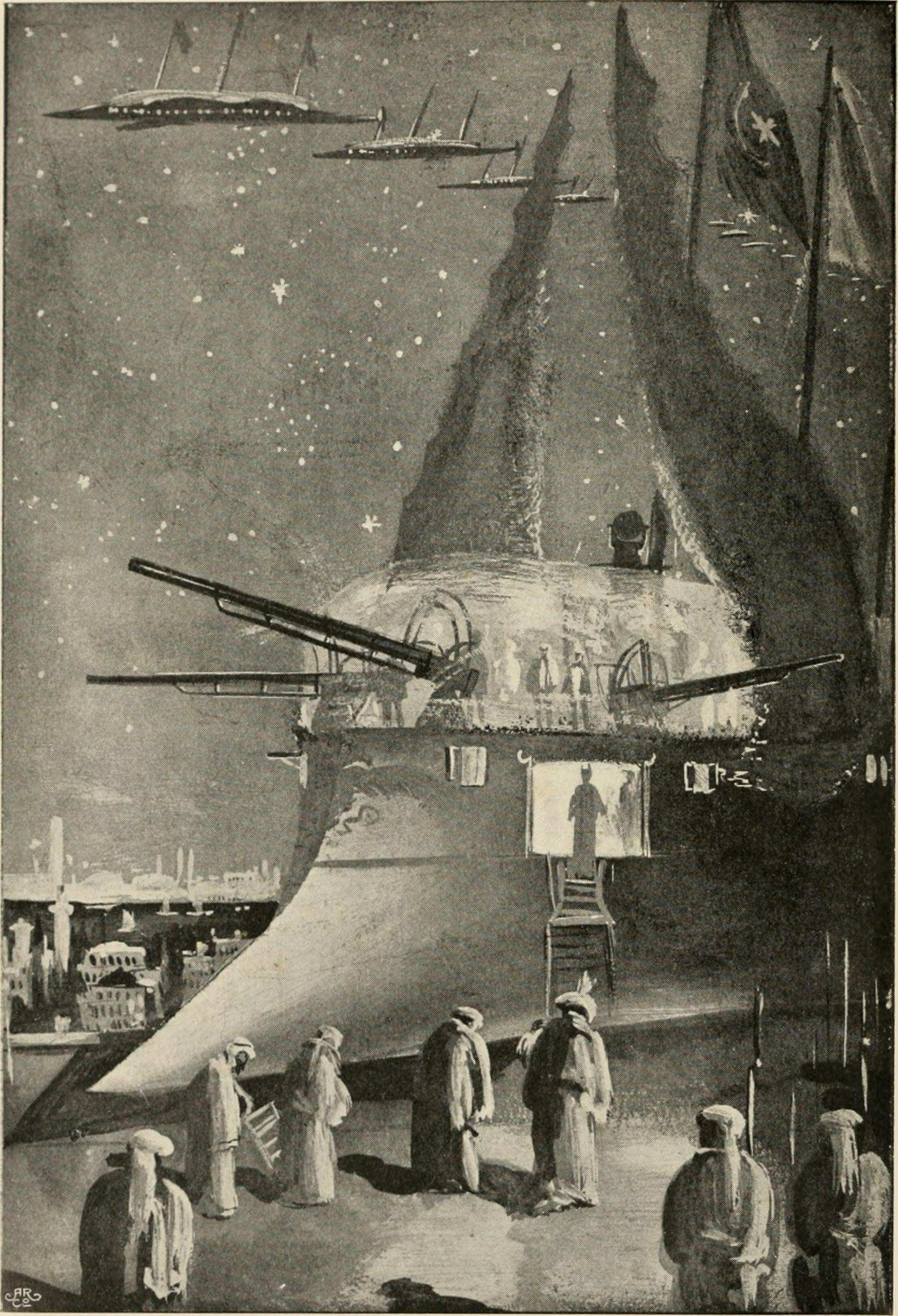
- frontispiece of the 1897 publication Illustration by Fred T. Jane; Evil in such a shape may be sometimes more than good
- Author: George Griffith
- Original title: Olga Romanoff, or, The Syren of the Skies
- Illustrator: Fred T. Jane
- Language: English
- Series: Angel of the Revolution
- Genre: Science fiction
- Set in: 1903–1905
- Publisher: Pearson's Weekly
- Publication date: 1893
- Publication place: UK
- Media type: book
- Preceded by: The Angel of the Revolution

Olga Romanoff (1894) is a science fiction novel by the English writer George Griffith, first published as The Syren of the Skies in Pearson's Weekly.

The novel continues (from The Angel of the Revolution) the tale of a worldwide brotherhood of anarchists fighting the world armed with fantastical airships, ending on an apocalyptic note as a comet smashes into the Earth.
