= German victory parade in Paris (1871) =

Event following Franco-Prussian War

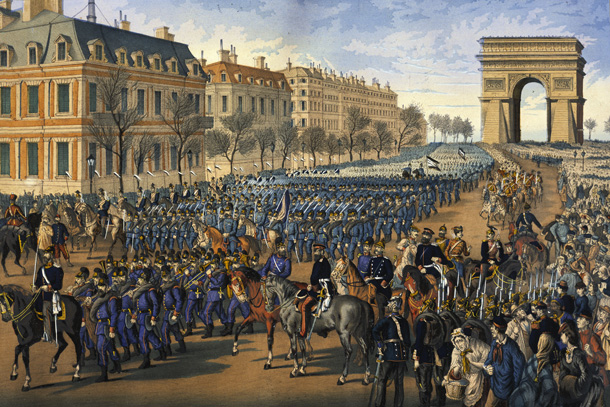
A depiction of the parade

On 1 March 1871 the Imperial German Army paraded through Paris to mark their victory in the Franco-Prussian War. The city had been under siege by Prussian forces since September 1870, with Prussia being unified into the German Empire on 18 January 1871. The Armistice of Versailles of 28 January ended hostilities, but the city remained in French hands. Preliminary peace terms were agreed in the 26 February Treaty of Versailles, which allowed 30,000 German troops to occupy Paris from 1 March until the treaty was ratified.

German troops entered the city at 8 am that day, marching down the Champs-Élysées and occupying the Place de la Concorde. They were followed by additional troops at 3 pm, who paraded down the Champs-Élysées with fifes and drums playing. Further parades were planned, including the entry of the newly proclaimed William I, German Emperor, but the quick action of the French National Assembly to ratify the Treaty of Versailles prevented this. German troops withdrew from the city two days later.

== Background ==
The French Emperor Napoleon III had surrendered with his army on 2 September 1870 after defeat at the Battle of Sedan. His government collapsed, and the French Third Republic was proclaimed with a Government of National Defense. Paris, the French capital, came under Prussian siege on 19 September. With the professional army either dead, wounded, captured or besieged at Metz, the French government tried to raise a force from the civilian population to continue the war and relieve Paris. This proved unsuccessful, and the Armistice of Versailles, bringing an end to hostilities, came into effect on 28 January 1871.

The Armistice was between France and the unified German Empire, which had been established on 18 January. Part of the terms of the armistice allowed French troops the privilege of firing the last shot of the siege at Paris and prohibited German troops from entering the city. During the armistice German troops remained in place around Paris but permitted French civilians to cross through their lines and allowed delivery of aid packages to the starving city.

The French agreed preliminary peace terms at the 26 February Treaty of Versailles. These outlined heavy reparations and territorial concessions and the right of the German Empire to station troops in France until paid. Under the terms of the treaty the Germans were permitted to station 30,000 men in Paris from 1 March and, if further agreement was not forthcoming by 3 March, to resume hostilities. There were fears in Paris that fighting might resume as soon as the German Army entered the city. From late February the National Guard, which had largely ceased to obey orders from the French government, spontaneously rearmed themselves in anticipation of further conflict. During this period some German soldiers were permitted to pass into Paris, alone and unarmed, to visit cultural sites such as the Louvre and Les Invalides.

== Parade ==
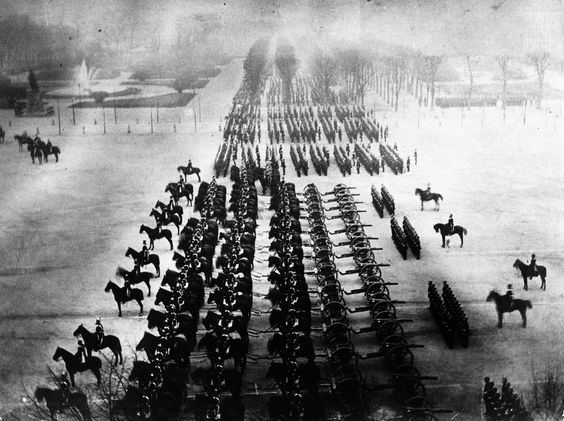
A photograph of the parade

The parade as depicted in the 11 March 1871 Illustrated London News

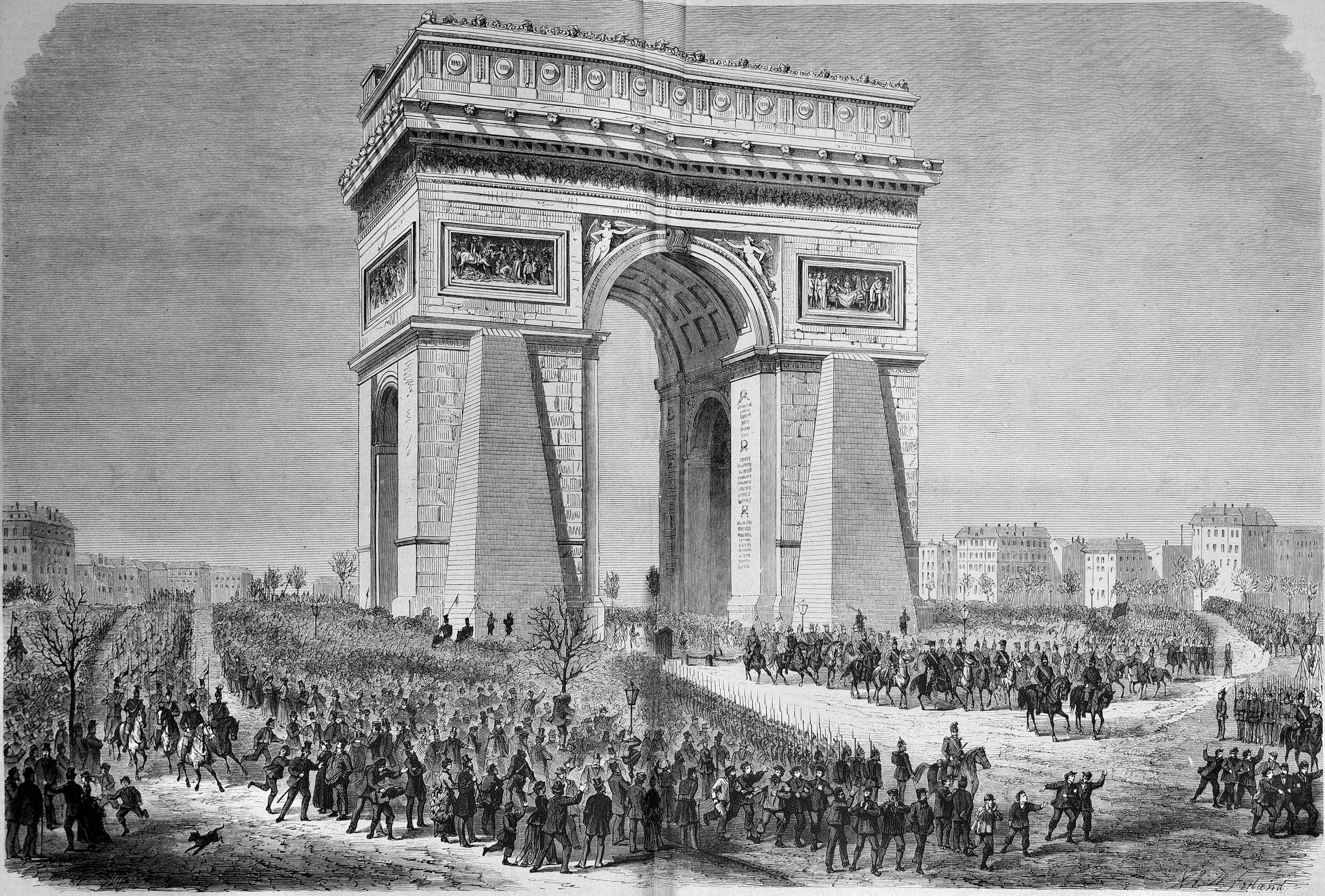
The parade from a German 1871 book

The night before the parade Paris citizens placed black veils over the faces of each statue in the Place de la Concorde, and some houses flew black flags as a mark of mourning for the capitulation of the city. At 8 am the first elements of the German Army entered the city, marching down the Champs-Élysées. A contingent of staff officers accompanied them and rode several times around the Place de la Concorde to take possession of it.

The remainder of the 30,000 troops paraded before William I, recently proclaimed as German emperor, at Longchamp Racecourse outside the city. These troops entered Paris at around 10.30 am. These troops paraded formally down the Champs-Élysées at around 3 pm with fifes and drums playing. Parisian citizens had attempted to block the arch of the Arc de Triomphe, but the leading elements of German cavalry were able to pass through it. Some sources incorrectly insist that the Arc de Triomphe was not marched through. The parade included elements of the Prussian, Bavarian and Saxon armies and was watched by a sullen and angry Parisian crowd. The German Army marched in battle order, rather than parade order.

The Paris National Guard made an effort to keep its members under control during the parade, and there was generally no violence between the German troops and the Parisians. French politician and philosopher Jules Simon noted in an 1879 work that some elements of the guard deployed five cannon at the Moulin de la Galette, in full view of the German Army, but no confrontation came about; that some Parisians carried barrels of gunpowder to the Élysée Palace and threatened to blow it up; and that the German troops were closely supervised by their officers so that there were no serious depredations.

Simon also records that a Parisian onlooker who hissed at the Germans on parade was pursued over a hoarding and into a house. German troops entered the house to detain the man, in the course of which several French civilians were wounded and a Prussian soldier lost an eye to a thrown stone. Simon states that the suspect was executed on the scene. The Paris mob seized several French citizens who were residents of Alsace, suspecting them of being German citizens. Several women who spoke with German soldiers were also beaten. Scottish war correspondent Archibald Forbes was attacked by the mob for being polite to Prussian troops and speaking to them in German. He was rescued by the National Guard and released after being brought before a magistrate.

The German force for the occupation of the city was commanded by General Georg von Kameke. The troops were accompanied by all of their baggage and a full complement of ambulances, telegraphs, canteens and forage wagons, which were held in the Palais de l'Industrie, the Rotonde des Panoramas and the circus. After the parade, German soldiers occupied part of the city and wandered freely through western Paris.

== Following days ==
The same day as the parade the French National Assembly had voted to accept the Treaty of Versailles. This quick acceptance surprised the Germans, who had expected to remain in occupation of the city for a considerable period while the assembly debated. The Germans had planned further parades, including a triumphal entrance of the emperor into the city on 3 March. William was to have been accompanied by senior politician Otto von Bismarck and army chief Helmuth von Moltke the Elder. News of the ratification was delivered to the Germans by telegram at 7 pm on 1 March, but they delayed their withdrawal, insisting that it would begin only when the formal ratification document was delivered into Bismarck's hands.

The further parades were cancelled. William remained at Versailles, with Crown Prince Frederick. Bismarck did enter the city on 2 March, but reached no further than the Avenue de la Grande Armée. Visits by German soldiers to Les Invalides were cancelled on safety grounds, and the French tried to persuade the Germans not to enter the Louvre, stating that all the paintings had been taken into storage. The Germans pressed ahead with their plans, and screens were erected at the museum to shield the visiting Germans from the Parisians. German forces paraded in its courtyard, and some officers entered the building, reaching the Galerie d'Apollon and the Balcony of Henry III. Their appearance at the latter led to cries of anger from the Parisian crowd, and two-sous coins were thrown at the officers. During the occupation cafés and shops in Paris closed "on account of national mourning".

The French vice president and Jules Favre, minister of foreign affairs delivered the ratification document to Paris. The evacuation of German troops commenced early on 3 March and was complete by noon. After the withdrawal there was some looting by Parisian citizens before the National Guard restored order. Some Parisians symbolically scrubbed the city's cobblestones along the route of the parade to "clean" them where German boots had trod.

== Aftermath ==
Elements of the German force returned to Berlin, where there was a series of military parades through the city, overseen by William. The 10 May Treaty of Frankfurt formally brought the war to an end. The conditions of the treaty were severe, with Alsace-Lorraine annexed to the German Empire and the German Army remaining in occupation of several French departments until reparations of 5 billion francs were paid. In Paris revolutionary sentiment rose in the weeks following the parade, and on 19 March the short-lived Paris Commune was proclaimed.
