= The Great War of 1892 =

1892 magazine article and war novel book with similar title

The Great War of 189-. A forecast.
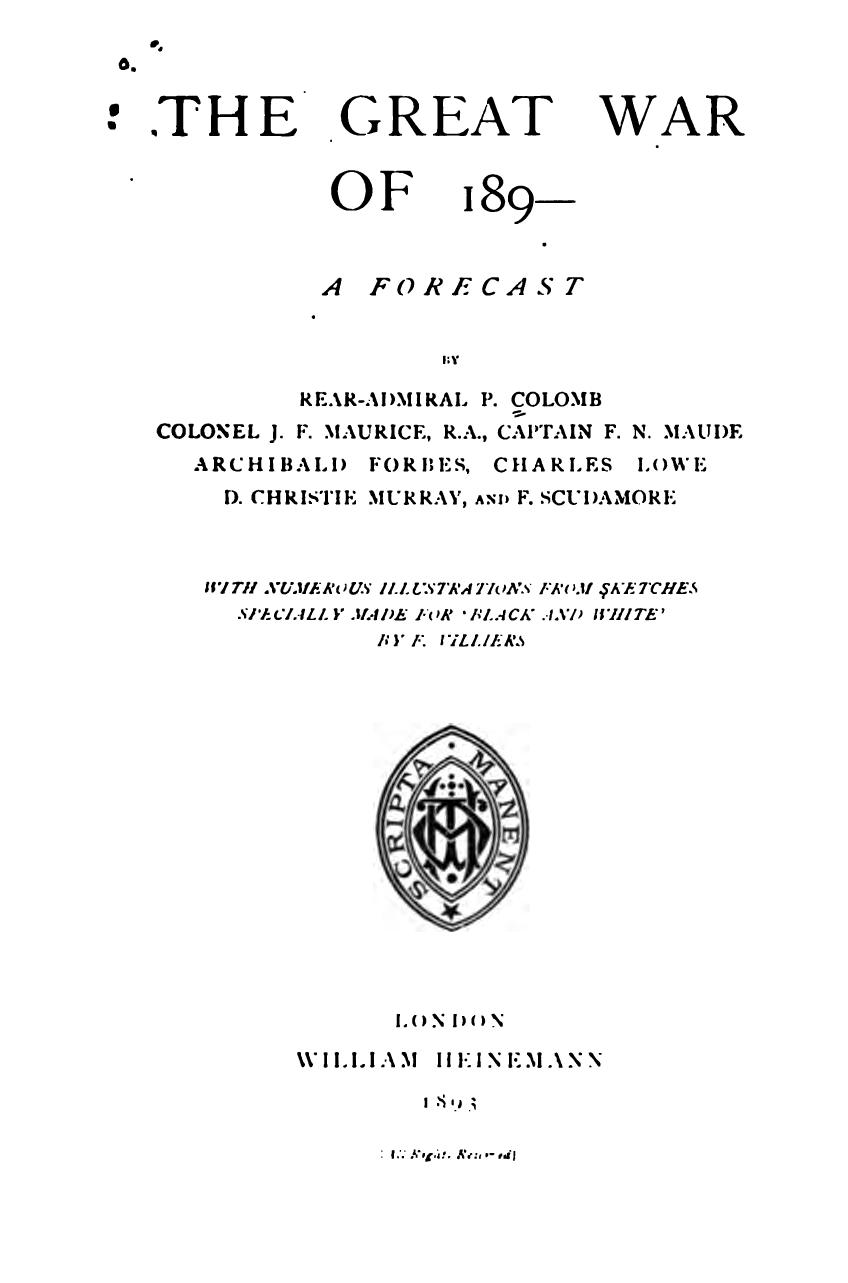
- Author: Philip Howard Colomb, J.F. Maurice, Frederic Natusch Maude, Archibald Forbes, Charles Lowe, David Christie Murray, and Francis Scudamore
- Illustrator: Frederic Villiers
- Language: English
- Genre: invasion novel
- Set in: Britain, France
- Publisher: William Heinemann, London
- Publication place: UK
- English publication date: 1893 [1892]
- Media type: book
- OCLC: 1229495444

The Great War of 1892 was a story of the genre termed "Invasion Literature" written by Admiral Philip Howard Colomb and six co-authors, intended to warn Britain about what he saw as the weakness of the Royal Navy. It was serialized in 1892 in Black and White, a weekly magazine which focused on the exploits of Britain's Army and Navy. The fictional story was a collaboration between Colomb and several experienced journalists and officers (such as J.F. Maurice, Archibald Forbes, David Christie Murray) and had been prompted by the success of the 1871 novella The Battle of Dorking by George Tomkyns Chesney.

The story The Great War of 1892 was published as a book under the title The Great War of 189-. A forecast, in December 1892. A second edition appeared in 1895. Its success led in turn to the commissioning of George Griffith's 1893 futuristic fantasy The Angel of the Revolution.

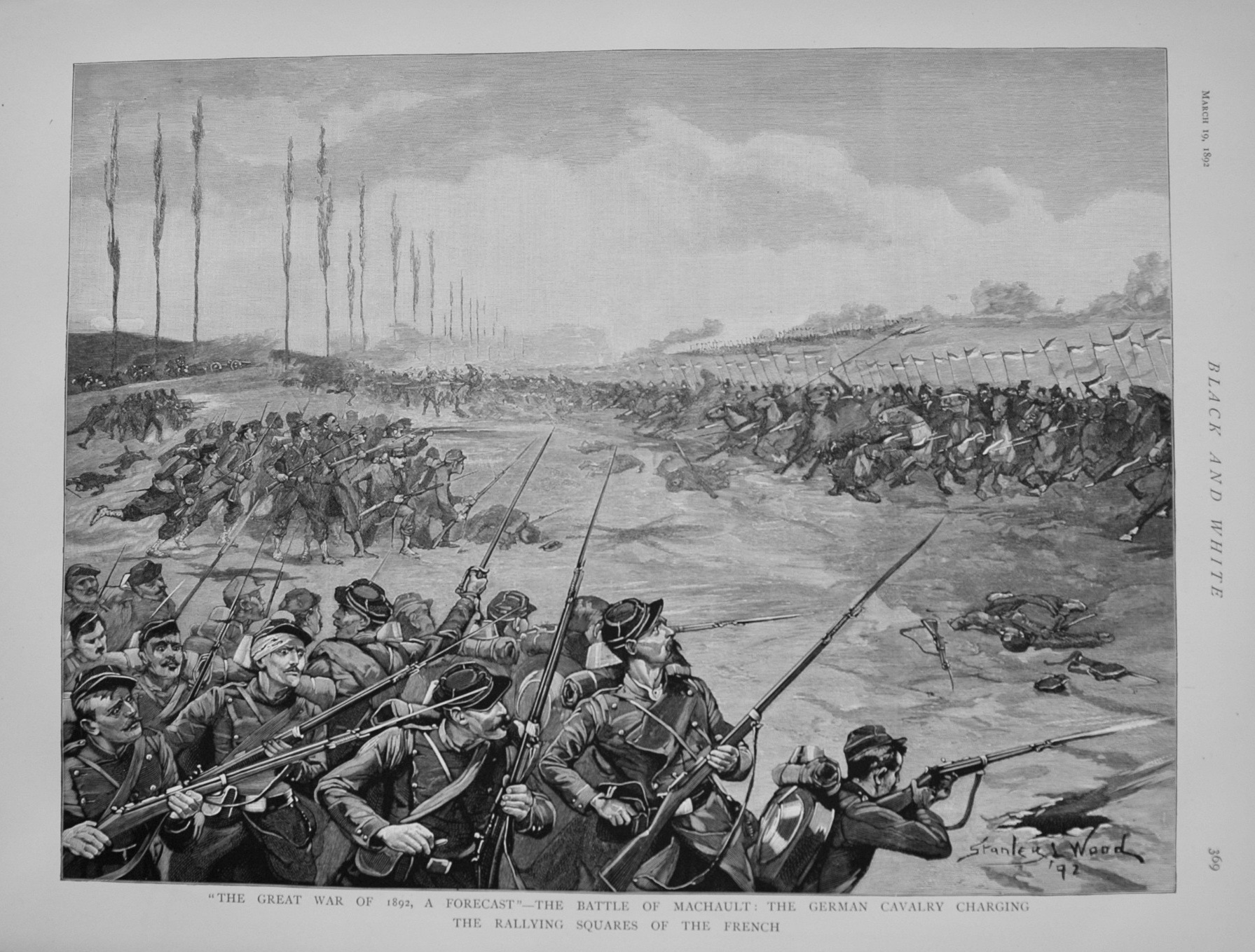
Stanley L. Wood: The Great War of 1892, a Forecast - The Battle of Machault, the German Cavalry Charging the Rallying Squares of the French, 1892. Illustration from the magazine Black & White, March 19, 1892. Engraving.

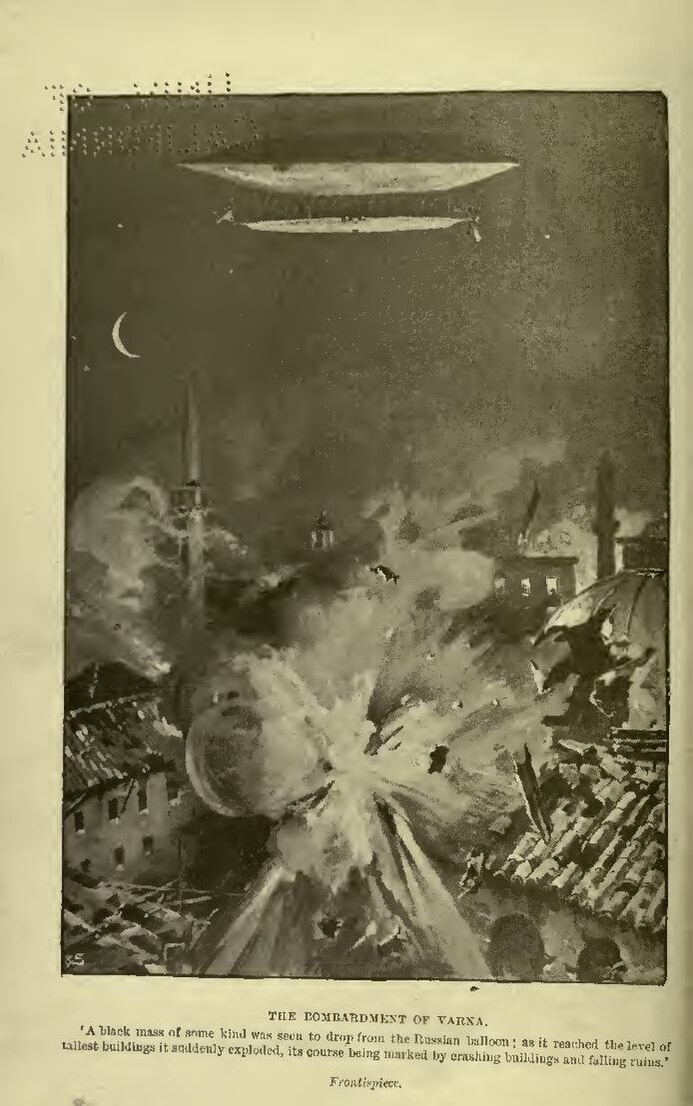
P. H. Colomb et al.: The Great War of 189-. A forecast. Book frontispice, 1892.
