= David Christie Murray =

English journalist and author (1847–1907)

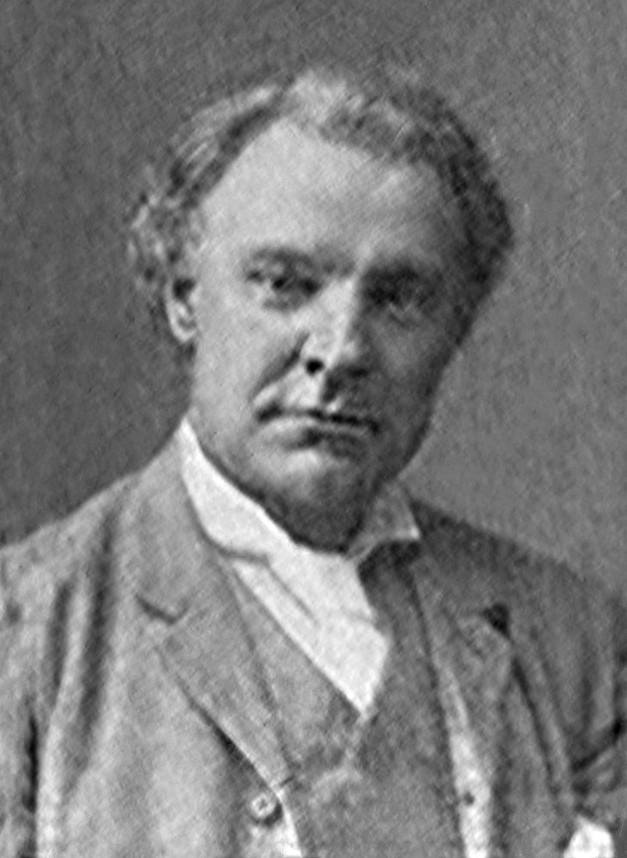
- Born: 13 April 1847; High Street, West Bromwich, Staffordshire, England
- Died: 1 August 1907 (aged 60); London, England
- Resting place: Hampstead
- Occupations: Journalist; writer

David Christie Murray (13 April 1847 – 1 August 1907) was an English journalist, who also wrote fiction.

== Life ==
Murray was born in a home at High Street, West Bromwich, Staffordshire, one of six sons and five daughters of William Murray and Mary Withers; he was educated in West Bromwich and Spon Lane. At the age of twelve, he joined his father's printing business. At age eighteen, he was sent to London for more training for the printing business, but, after a failed attempt at romance, he instead enlisted with the army. He became a private with the 4th Royal Irish Dragoon Guards. After being bought out of the service by a great aunt, he became a journalist. Initially he wrote leaders for the Wednesbury Advertiser, then worked for the newspaper Birmingham Morning News reporting on police cases. In 1871, he married Sophie Harris, with whom he had a daughter, who died young. He had four children out of wedlock.

Murray reported on the Russo-Turkish War during 1877–1878, then gave up journalism to write fiction. He spent a year touring England for a series of articles published in The Mayfair Magazine. About 1879 he married his second wife, Alice, and the couple had a son, Archibald. That year, Murray's story A Life's Atonement appeared in Chamber's Journal, followed by Joseph's Coat in 1880. The late 19th-century author George Gissing wrote in his diary that he had "heard of the book as good; of course find it very poor." His 1882 novel By the Gate of Les was serialised in Cornhill Magazine and Aunt Rachel (1886) in The English Illustrated Magazine. From 1881 to 1886 he lived in Belgium and France and from 1889 to 1896 in Nice, France. Murray was well-travelled and a success as a lecturer. During 1889, he gave a lecture tour in Australia, then during 1890 assisted productions there of the theatre company of Harry St. Maur. During 1884–1885 he lectured in Canada and the United States.

His work of criticism, My Contemporaries In Fiction, included "Under French encouragement: Thomas Hardy". In that essay he challenged some of the features of Hardy's later novels, in particular Jude the Obscure, the characterisation in it of Sue Bridehead, and its effect on impressionable readers: "one of the gravest dangers which beset women is that of hysterical self-deception ... to make them believe that their emotions are worthy of the great human heart is to increase their morbid temptations."

His financial difficulties increased in his later years, exacerbated by illness. One of his stories was completed when he was in the infirmary of HM Prison Wandsworth.

Murray died in London after a long period of illness.

== Bibliography ==
- A life's atonement (1879)
- Joseph's coat (1880)
- Val Strange (1881)
- Coals of fire (1881)
- Hearts (1882)
- By the gate of Les (1882)
- Aunt Rachel (1886)
- The way of the World (1883)
- Old Blazer's hero (1887)
- A novelist's notebook (1887)
- A bit of human nature (1889)
- Cynic fortune (1889)
- A dangerous catspaw (1889) with Henry Herman
- First person singular (1889)
- Model father (1889)
- One traveller returns (1889) with Henry Herman
- Rainbow gold (1889)
- Schwartz (1889)
- The weaker vessel (1889)
- Wild Darrie (1889) with Henry Herman
- The Bishops' Bible (1890) with Henry Herman
- Paul Jones's alias (1890) with Henry Herman
- He fell among thieves (1891), 2 volumes
- Only a shadow (1891)
- Bob Martin's little girl (1892)
- The Great War of 189- (1892) (with P.H. Colomb and others)
- A wasted crime (1893)
- Time's revenge (1893)
- In direst peril (1894)
- The making of a novelist, an experiment in autobiography (1894)
- The martyred fool (1895)
- The investigations of John Pym (1895)
- Mount Despair and other stories (1895)
- A rising star (1895)
- A Capful o' Nails (1896)
- My contemporaries in fiction (1897)
- A rogue's conscience (1897)
- The Cockney Columbus (1898)
- A race for millions (1898)
- Tales in prose and verse (1898)
- Recollections (1908)
