= Pearson's Weekly =

British weekly periodical

- Editor: C. Arthur Pearson
- Frequency: Weekly
- Publisher: C. Arthur Pearson Ltd
- First issue: 1890
- Final issue: 1939
- Company: C. Arthur Pearson Ltd
- Country: UK
- Language: English

Pearson's Weekly was a British weekly periodical founded in London in 1890 by Arthur Pearson, who had previously worked on Tit-Bits for George Newnes.

The first issue was well advertised and sold a quarter of a million copies. The paper's stated aim was "To Interest, to Elevate and to Amuse".

== Notable fiction published ==
- George Griffith, The Angel of the Revolution: A Tale of the Coming Terror (1893)
- George Griffith, The Syren of the Skies (1894)
- H. G. Wells, The Invisible Man (1897)
- M. P. Shiel, Contraband of War (1898)
- Sax Rohmer, The Mysterious Mummy (1903)
- Rupert Croft-Cooke, "The Legacy" (1932)
- William Edward Vickers, The Rubber Truncheon (1934)
- Ethel Lina White, "Honey" (1935)

== See also ==
- Pearson's Magazine
