= Frederick Maurice (British Army officer, born 1841) =

English general (1841–1912)

Major-General Sir Frederick Maurice KCB
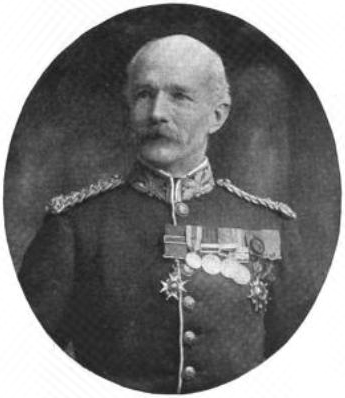
- In The Sketch, 8 August 1900
- Born: John Frederick Maurice; 24 May 1841; London, England
- Died: 12 January 1912 (aged 70); Camberley, England
- Spouse: Annie FitzGerald (m. 1869)
- Children: at least 11 (including Frederick Barton Maurice)
- Relatives: Frederick Maurice (father); Joan Robinson (granddaughter)
- Military career
- Branch: British Army
- Service years: 1861–1912
- Rank: Major-General
- Conflicts: Anglo-Ashanti Wars; Zulu War
- Other work: Writer; academic

Major-General Sir John Frederick Maurice KCB (24 May 1841 – 12 January 1912) was a senior British Army officer, chiefly remembered for his military writings.

== Family and early life ==
Maurice was born in Southwark, London in 1841, the eldest son of Rev. Frederick Denison Maurice, an Anglican priest, theologian and author, by his first wife, Anna Eleanor Barton, a daughter of Lieutenant-General Charles Barton. He published several volumes on his father's life in 1884.

Maurice was educated at the Royal India Military College, Addiscombe, and the Royal Military Academy, Woolwich, and was commissioned into the Royal Artillery in December 1861.

== Career ==
Maurice served as private secretary to Sir Garnet Wolseley in the Ashanti Campaign of 1873–1874; in the Zulu War in 1879; was deputy assistant adjutant general of the Egyptian expedition in 1882; and was brevetted colonel in 1885. In 1885–1892 he was professor of military history at the Staff College, Camberley, and in 1895 was promoted to major general. Later in his career he was commander of the Woolwich District until September 1902, and he retired from the army in January 1903.

He was subsequently appointed Honorary Colonel of the 3rd Kent Artillery Volunteers (Royal Arsenal) on 14 February 1903.

In 1905, Maurice was part of a team which went to Berlin to negotiate with the Germans on the problems of the Navy estimates and the escalating threat posed to the Empire. In January 1906, news was leaked to The Times that implicated him in the leaking of war material purchases, which he had discussed. Sir Henry Campbell-Bannerman, the prime minister, complained to Sir Edward Grey, the Foreign Secretary, of "an outrageous interview with Genl. Sir F. Maurice in a French paper, describing all that wd. happen if Germany & France went to war; how we of course should join France".

Later in the same parliament British government policy evolved around Grey's adherence to the Entente Cordiale and the British willingness to defend the neutrality of the Low Countries.

== Personal life ==
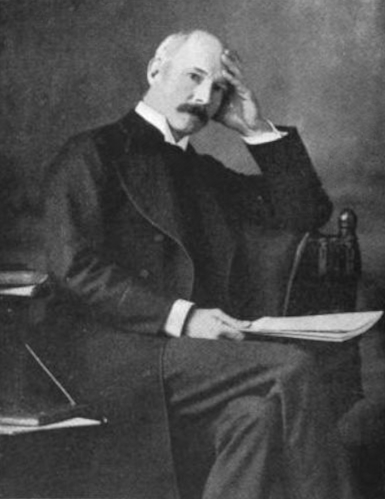

In Dublin in 1869, Maurice married Anne Frances "Annie" FitzGerald, the daughter of Richard Augustine FitzGerald (1814-1889). They had a large family of at least 11 children. His eldest son was Sir Frederick Maurice (1871–1951). His second daughter Annie married John Macmillan, Bishop of Guildford. Another daughter, Cosette, married the Oxford military historian, C. T. Atkinson.

== Writings ==
Maurice's reputation depends chiefly on his military writings, which include:

- Hostilities without Declaration of War (1883)
- Popular History of Ashanti Campaign (1874)
- The Life of Frederick Denison Maurice; Chiefly Told in His Own Letters (1884)
- The Balance of Military Power in Europe (1888)
- War (1891)
- The Great War of 1892 (1892) (along with P.H. Colomb and others)
- National Defences (1897)
- The Franco-German War, 1870–1871 (1900) (along with Wilfred J. Long, A. Sonnenschein et al.)
- Diary of Sir John Moore (1904)
- History of the War in South Africa, an official account (four volumes, 1906–1910)
