= George Griffith =

British science fiction writer (1857–1906)

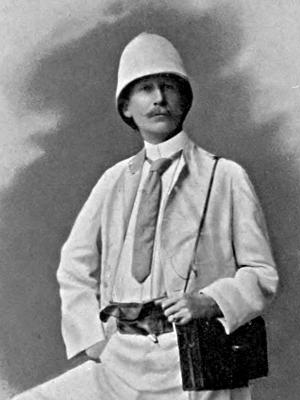
- Griffith pictured on the frontispiece of his book In an Unknown Prison Land (1901)
- Born: George Chetwynd Griffith-Jones; 20 August 1857; Plymouth, Devon, England
- Died: 4 June 1906 (aged 48); Port Erin, Isle of Man
- Occupation: Writer
- Spouse: Elizabeth Brierly (m. 1887)
- Children: 3, including Alan Arnold
- Writing career
- Pen name: Lara; Levin Carnac; Stanton Morich
- Language: English
- Notable works: The Angel of the Revolution (1893); Briton or Boer? (1897); A Honeymoon in Space (1901)

George Chetwynd Griffith-Jones (20 August 1857 – 4 June 1906) was a British writer. He was active mainly in the science fiction genre—or as it was known at the time, scientific romance—in particular writing many future-war stories and playing a significant role in shaping that emerging subgenre. For a short period of time, he was the leading science fiction author in his home country both in terms of popularity and commercial success.

Griffith grew up with his parents and older brother, receiving home-schooling and moving frequently during his childhood due to his father's career as a clergyman. Following his father's death when Griffith was 14 years old, he went to school for a little over a year before leaving England and travelling the world, returning at the age of 19. He then worked as a teacher for ten years before pursuing a career in writing. After an initial setback that left Griffith without the means to provide for himself, he was hired by the publisher C. Arthur Pearson in 1890. Griffith made his literary breakthrough with his debut novel The Angel of the Revolution (1893), which was serialized in Pearson's Weekly before being published in book format. He signed a contract of exclusivity with Pearson and followed it up with the likewise successful sequel Olga Romanoff (1894).

Griffith was highly active as a writer throughout the 1890s, producing numerous serials and short stories for Pearson's various publications. He also wrote non-fiction for Pearson and went on various travel assignments. Among these were an 1894 publicity stunt in which he circumnavigated the world in 65 days, an 1895 journey to South America where he covered the various revolutionary movements active there at the time, and an 1896 trip to Southern Africa that resulted in Griffith writing the novel Briton or Boer? (1897) anticipating the outbreak of the Boer War (1899–1902). Griffith's career declined in the latter part of the 1890s, and he was surpassed by H. G. Wells as the favourite science fiction writer of both Pearson and the reading public. His last outright success was A Honeymoon in Space (1901), and he parted ways with Pearson shortly thereafter. With his health in decline, likely due to alcoholism, he continued writing prolifically up until his death at the age of 48.

Griffith was both successful and influential as a writer at the peak of his career, but he has since descended into obscurity. Retrospective assessments have found his works to have been timely and prescient—in particular with regard to the importance of aerial warfare—but not timeless, and he is commonly regarded as a relatively poor writer, especially when compared to his main rival, Wells. He regularly incorporated his personal viewpoints into his fiction, and anti-American sentiments expressed in this way ensured that he never established a readership in the United States as publishers there would not print his works. He was irreligious and in his youth advocated fiercely for secularism. Politically, Griffith was early an outspoken socialist, though he is believed to have gradually shifted towards more right-leaning sympathies later in his life. Socially, he has been described as embodying Victorian ideals, including social conservatism and staunch pro-British views.

== Biography ==
=== Early life ===
George Chetwynd Griffith-Jones was born in Plymouth, Devon, on 20 August 1857. His parents were the clergyman George Alfred Jones and Jeanette Henry Capinster Jones. The family, which also included Griffith's older brother, moved repeatedly during his childhood due to his father's career. They moved from Plymouth to Tring, Hertfordshire, in 1860, then on to two poverty-stricken parishes in the Greater Manchester area: first to Ashton-under-Lyne in 1861, and then to Mossley, where his father was appointed vicar in 1864.

As the family's financial situation did not allow for the formal education of two sons, Griffith was home-schooled, with his mother teaching him French and his father Latin and Greek. He also spent considerable time exploring his father's extensive library, which was filled with the works of authors who would later serve as Griffith's literary influences, including Walter Scott and Jules Verne. Following the death of his father in January 1872, he started studying at a private school in Southport at the age of 14. There the limits of his home-schooling soon became apparent, the lack of any mathematical proficiency in particular, but through concerted effort he progressed to being the second-best pupil in his class.

Then I went to another school, or perhaps I should put it more correctly if I said that I matriculated in the greatest of all universities—the world. I went to sea as an apprentice on a Liverpool lime-juicer ... In the seventy-eight days between Liverpool and Melbourne I learnt more of the world than I had learnt in fourteen years, but the methods of tuition didn't suit me. The learning was hammered in a little too hard, mostly with a rope's end and the softest part of a belaying pin, so I took French leave of that class-room and went to another; in plain English, I ran away from my ship and went up in the bush.

— George Griffith, quoted in Sam Moskowitz, Strange Horizons: The Spectrum of Science Fiction

Griffith left the school after 15 months, out of economic necessity—his father had left behind less than £300, all of which went to his wife in the absence of a will—and joined a sailing ship as an apprentice at the age of 15. He deserted his ship in Melbourne after 11 weeks at sea, having found the experience highly instructive but the corporal punishment in particular gruelling. He then took various employments in Australia—chiefly manual labour, but also briefly serving as a tutor—before using his earnings to travel. He later claimed both to have received an offer to marry a Polynesian princess and to have circumnavigated the globe six times; about the latter, the science fiction historian Sam Moskowitz says that "the variety of locales for his stories would tend to substantiate this claim." He returned to England at the age of 19.

=== Teaching career ===
Griffith started working as a schoolmaster in 1877, six months after his return to England, teaching English at the preparatory school Worthing College in Sussex. At this time, he had no formal qualifications and studied at night to be able to give lessons in the daytime. He left Worthing to study at a university in Germany, returning a year later to teach at Brighton. He continued to study at nights to get the necessary teaching diplomas for a career in education. He started his writing career while at Brighton, writing for local papers among others. He then took a job teaching at Bolton Grammar School in 1883, and while there published his first two books: the poetry collections Poems (1883) and The Dying Faith (1884), both published under his pen name Lara. There he met Elizabeth Brierly (1861–1933); they married in February 1887 and eventually had two sons and a daughter. He passed the College of Preceptors exam the same year, thus completing his formal education in teaching, and promptly left that line of work in favour of pursuing a career in writing. He would later describe his time working as a teacher as "ten years' penal servitude".

=== Writing career ===
==== Early career ====
Griffith and Brierly moved to London, where he started working as a journalist at a paper in 1888. He worked his way up to become the magazine's editor, and eventually took over as owner. At the time, Griffith was highly politically active, advocating for socialism and secularism. His political activism resulted in the paper being the target of a libel suit. Griffith decided against hiring a lawyer, opting instead to represent himself, and ended up losing the case which led to the paper going out of business. Griffith was thus unemployed, and while he continued to pen political and religious pamphlets for a while as a freelancer, it was not enough to provide a living. In 1889 he was involved in another court case against the Member of Parliament and declared atheist Charles Bradlaugh, whom Griffith and William Stewart Ross had criticized in among other publications a pamphlet titled Ananias, The Atheist's God: For the Attention of Charles Bradlaugh; Griffith won the case and was awarded £30 in damages.

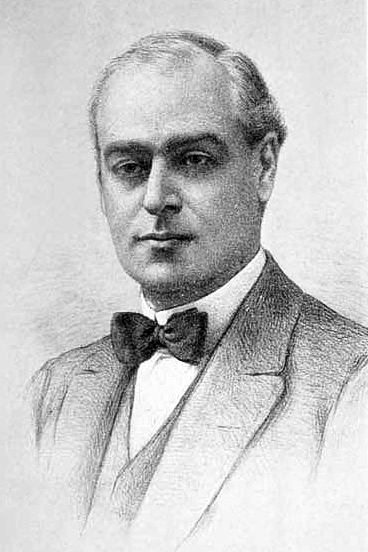
C. Arthur Pearson, whom Griffith worked for throughout the 1890s

A friend of Griffith's wrote him a letter of introduction to the publisher C. Arthur Pearson. He got a job at the newly founded Pearson's Weekly in 1890, initially tasked by the editor Peter Keary with writing addresses on envelopes for the magazine's competitions. He made a good impression on Keary through his skill as a conversationalist, largely owing to his background travelling the world, and was soon promoted to columnist. He carried on in this capacity for the rest of the decade.

==== Breakthrough ====
Griffith made his literary breakthrough in 1893 with what was then known as a scientific romance—an exciting adventure story, or "romance", with cutting-edge science playing a key role—and would later be called science fiction. The future war genre had been popular since the publication of George Tomkyns Chesney's novella "The Battle of Dorking" (1871), and the rival magazine Black & White had just had a major success in the genre with the serialized novel The Great War of 1892 (1892) by Philip Howard Colomb. Pearson wanted to capitalize on both of these trends; Pearson's Weekly had from the start published short stories, and when the staff discussed who among them might try their hand at a future-war serial, Griffith volunteered. He brought in a synopsis the following day, and got the assignment. The synopsis was published in Pearson's Weekly on 14 January 1893, before the story itself had been written. The next week's edition saw the publication of the first of 39 weekly instalments of Griffith's story, The Angel of the Revolution. The name of the author was not revealed until the final issue on 14 October 1893. The serial received positive reviews and the magazine saw a sharp increase in number of issues sold. Griffith's first son—Alan Arnold Griffith—was born during the serialization on 13 June 1893 and named after two characters in The Angel of the Revolution.

The London-based Tower Publishing Company quickly secured the book rights to The Angel of the Revolution, publishing an abridged hardcover edition in October 1893. The book version was likewise a success, receiving rave reviews and becoming a best-seller; it was printed in six editions within a year and at least eleven editions in total, and a review in The Pelican declared Griffith to be "a second Jules Verne". Pearson responded by signing a contract of exclusivity with Griffith and providing him with a secretary for dictation. Griffith was then the most popular and commercially successful science fiction author in the country. The Angel of the Revolution was not, however, published in the United States in either book or serial format. Due to anti-American sentiments expressed in Griffith's work—in the story, the Constitution of the United States is physically destroyed and it is stated that "there were few who in their hearts did not believe the Republic to be a colossal fraud", for instance—US publishers wanted nothing to do with him or his stories. None of Griffith's books were published in the US until more than half a century after his death, and it would not be until 1902 that the first and only serial of his was published in a US magazine. (Note: Not counting the US edition of Pearson's Magazine, which at the time carried the same material as the UK edition, and wherein Stories of Other Worlds appeared in 1900. Thus, while two of Griffith's serials were published in the US, only one was published in a magazine that was both edited and published in the US.)

==== Mid-1890s ====
The success of The Angel of the Revolution quickly led to the announcement of a sequel, The Syren of the Skies, in the 23 December 1893 issue of Pearson's Weekly. It was serialized in 32 instalments from 30 December 1893 to 4 August 1894, and published in hardcover format by Tower in November 1894 under the title Olga Romanoff. The story was another best-seller, though not quite reaching the heights achieved by its predecessor. It also received critical acclaim, with a reviewer for The Birmingham Chronicle declaring Griffith "the English Jules Verne". Parallel to the serialization of The Syren of the Skies, Griffith carried out a publicity stunt on behalf of Pearson by travelling around the world in as little time as possible, emulating the fictional journey in Verne's Around the World in Eighty Days (1872). Pearson's Weekly had serialized Elizabeth Bisland's 14 November 1889 – 30 January 1890 circumnavigation under the title "Round the World in 76 Days", starting with the magazine's very first issue on 26 July 1890 and finishing on 25 October. Pearson thought Griffith an ideal candidate for surpassing that accomplishment, given his experience travelling. Griffith accomplished the feat in 65 days, starting on 12 March 1894 and finishing on 16 May. The tale of his journey was told in Pearson's Weekly in 14 parts between 2 June and 1 September 1894, bearing the title "How I Broke the Record Round the World". (Note: Later published in book form in 2008 under the title Around the World in 65 Days.) Around the same time, in May 1894, he legally changed his name to George Griffith by deed poll.

Pearson tasked Griffith with writing a new future-war serial to boost sales of Short Stories, a magazine he had acquired in mid-1893. This became The Outlaws of the Air, serialized between 8 September 1894 and 23 March 1895. It was the last of Griffith's stories to be published by Tower before the company folded in June 1896; while the hardcover released in June 1895 sold well, he likely never received payment for it. The story mostly reiterated the main points of The Angel of the Revolution on a smaller scale, and while reviews were good, it was largely overshadowed by the release of Olga Romanoff. Griffith's next novel was the fantasy Valdar the Oft-Born, serialized 2 February – 24 August 1895 in Pearson's Weekly and published in book format by C. Arthur Pearson Ltd the same year. It is a tale of an immortal, an intentional imitation of Edwin Lester Arnold's The Wonderful Adventures of Phra the Phoenician (1890)—such imitation being common in the literature of the time. It was fairly well received by audiences, albeit not as warmly as Phra the Phoenician had been.

Griffith travelled to Peru on assignment in February 1895. Large portions of the South American continent were undergoing political turmoil at the time, (Note: See e.g. Federalist Revolution (Brazil), Liberal Revolution of 1895 (Ecuador), Peruvian Civil War of 1894–1895, and Venezuelan crisis of 1895.) and Griffith covered the various revolutionary factions in harshly critical terms, viewing them as aspiring oppressors. This appeared in Pearson's Weekly in a three-article series called "Election by Bullet" starting on 7 September 1895, after Griffith's return to England. During his trip Griffith also continued to write fiction, sending his works to England by boat. Six short stories were thus published under his pen name Levin Carnac in Pearson's Weekly in April and May 1895. Griffith later claimed to have found the source of the Amazon River; Moskowitz speculates that this could have happened during this assignment. His time in Peru also inspired him to write Golden Star, which he began working on during his return voyage. The story is a fantasy wherein the title character, an Inca princess, and her brother enter suspended animation ahead of the Spanish conquest in the hopes of one day restoring their rule. It was serialized in Short Stories between 7 September and 21 December 1895, but not published as a book until Griffith had found a new publisher to replace the defunct Tower Publishing Company—Pearson having ceased to publish his works in book format. This was to be F. V. White, introduced to him by William Le Queux—author of The Great War in England in 1897 (1894), and to whom Griffith had previously recommended Tower as a publisher. The story was published in book format under the title The Romance of Golden Star in June 1897; White would publish the majority of Griffith's books thereafter.

At this time, Pearson was expanding his business. He launched a new all-serial magazine called Pearson's Story Teller on 9 October 1895, for which Griffith wrote the historical adventure story The Knights of the White Rose. Pearson discovered new talents such as Louis Tracy and attracted established ones to his ventures, and launched the monthly periodical Pearson's Magazine in January 1896, intended as a prestige competitor to The Strand Magazine. Feeling that Griffith's serials were a poor fit for the new magazine, Pearson relegated him to writing ancillary materials for the publication. These included a March 1896 article harshly critical of US involvement in the construction of the Panama Canal and of the Monroe Doctrine more generally, titled "The Grave of a Nation's Honour", and the short story "A Genius for a Year" published under his pseudonym Levin Carnac in June 1896. H. G. Wells, whose The Time Machine (1895) had been a great success, wrote "In the Abyss" for the August 1896 issue of Pearson's Magazine and quickly replaced Griffith as Pearson's favourite science fiction writer. During the second half of the 1890s, Wells also supplanted Griffith as the best-selling science fiction writer, and the one most acclaimed by the public. Pearson would go on to publish Wells's The War of the Worlds in Pearson's Magazine April–December 1897 and The Invisible Man in Pearson's Weekly 12 June – 7 August 1897 as well as in an expanded book format in September 1897; the enormous success of the former meant Wells could work for whomever he pleased and name his price, and he would only write sporadically for Pearson thereafter.

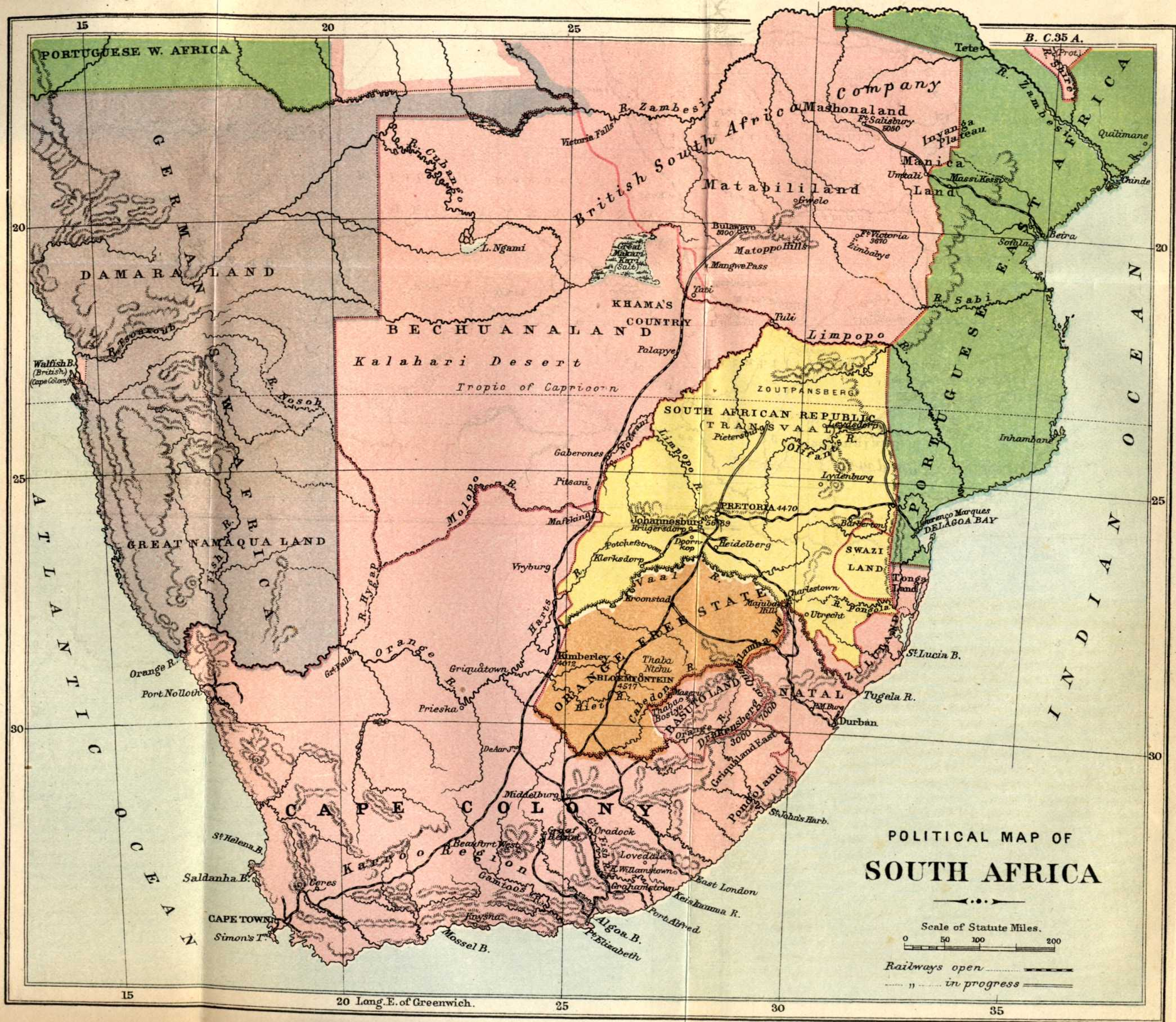
Political map of Southern Africa in the 1890s. In pink: British possessions. In orange: the Orange Free State. In yellow: the Transvaal Republic. In green: Portuguese possessions. In purple: German South West Africa.

In 1896, Griffith went on another travel assignment for Pearson, this time to Southern Africa. He had been asked to assess the political situation and write about possible future developments, and was given free rein to travel the region to that end. Griffith thus travelled to the British colonies of Cape Colony and Natal, the British Bechuanaland Protectorate, the Boer republics of Transvaal and the Orange Free State, and Portuguese Mozambique. He interviewed among others Transvaal President Paul Kruger, and came to the conclusion that a war between the British and the Boers was on the horizon. He wrote Briton or Boer? about such a war based on his research, and it was serialized in Pearson's Weekly starting on 1 August 1896—three years before the outbreak of the real Boer War on 11 October 1899. The serial concluded on 9 January 1897, and in February 1897 it became the first of Griffith's works to be published in book format by F. V. White. It sold well, with an eighth edition going into print in May 1900.

==== Decline ====
By the late 1890s, Griffith's career was in decline. Pearson had promised him the position of editor for a new publication with an international angle: The Passport, to be launched in 1897; the magazine never went to press. Griffith nevertheless continued his prolific writing, with his serial The Gold Magnet appearing in Short Stories starting on 16 October 1897 and the short story "The Great Crellin Comet" appearing in the special Christmas issue (Note: Says Moskowitz, "It was the vogue during that time to publish an extra issue at a greater size and price to be given as a gift at Christmas.") of Pearson's Weekly the same year. The former was later published in book format as The Gold-Finder by F. V. White in 1898, and the latter was included in Griffith's short story collection Gambles with Destiny, published by White in 1899. He returned to the future war genre with The Great Pirate Syndicate, which was serialized in another of Pearson's magazines, Pick-Me-Up, 19 February – 23 July 1898. It was a moderate commercial success, and F. V. White published it in book format in 1899.

Feeling the need for a change of pace, Griffith then turned to writing historical novels. He next wrote The Virgin of the Sun, a fictionalized but non-fantastical account of Francisco Pizarro's conquest of Peru in the 1530s, inspired by his South American journey a few years prior. Unusually, Pearson forwent serializing the story in favour of publishing it directly in book format in April 1898. After this, Griffith wrote The Rose of Judah, about the fall of Babylon in 539 BCE. It was serialized in Pearson's Weekly 8 October 1898 – 28 January 1899 and published in book format by Pearson in 1899. He also continued writing short stories. Among these were "A Corner in Lightning", wherein a man attempts to monopolize the newly-widespread commodity of household electricity, published in Pearson's Magazine in March 1898; "Hellville, U.S.A.", a story of a penal colony in Arizona that devolves into debauchery, published in Pearson's Weekly on 6 August 1898; and a series of detective stories appearing in Pearson's Magazine. "A Corner in Lightning" and "Hellville, U.S.A." were included in Gambles with Destiny alongside "A Genius for a Year" and "The Great Crellin Comet" in 1899.

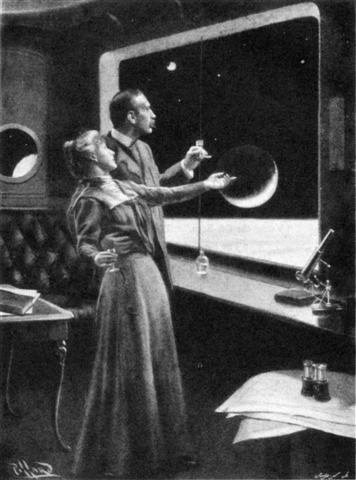
Original frontispiece to Griffith's A Honeymoon in Space, by Harold H. Piffard

By 1899, Griffith had moved from his Kensington home in London to Littlehampton to be able to engage in sailing, a favourite pastime of his. That year, he first appeared in the British Who's Who, and wrote the short stories "The Conversion of the Professor" and "The Searcher of Souls", published in the May issue of Pearson's Magazine and the Christmas number of Pearson's Weekly, respectively. Both stories would be incorporated into novels by Griffith towards the end of his life: the former into The Mummy and Miss Nitocris (1906) and the latter into A Mayfair Magician (1905); the science fiction scholar Brian Stableford comments that this was a forerunner to the concept of fix-up novels that would later become commonplace within science fiction. Griffith once again travelled abroad in late 1899, this time to Australia, and unusually at his own expense rather than as part of an assignment. During his time there, he wrote A Honeymoon in Space, a scientific romance novel about a newlywed couple traversing the Solar System. In a first for Griffith, it was serialized in the upmarket Pearson's Magazine—albeit in an abridged form—in six parts under the title Stories of Other Worlds, January–July (Note: See A Honeymoon in Space § Publication history.) 1900. Pearson published the full story in book format under Griffith's original title in 1901. It was the last outright success of Griffith's career.

Following the turn of the century, Griffith and Pearson parted ways. Griffith's last piece of fiction writing published by Pearson was "The Raid of Le Vengeur" in Pearson's Magazine in February 1901 and his last non-fiction was an essay in Pearson's Magazine in November 1902. Griffith nevertheless continued writing prolifically, though he did not meet with much success. In 1901 he wrote two novels dealing with the occult—a subject he had previously touched upon in The Destined Maid in 1898—Denver's Double, which deals with hypnotism and spiritual possession, and Captain Ishmael, a story about an immortal that features the legendary Wandering Jew as a side character. They were published by F. V. White in April and Hutchinson in October, respectively; neither was serialized. Supernatural and otherwise fanciful elements also appeared in a couple of short stories in the later years of Griffith's career: "The Lost Elixir" about an undead mummy, published in The Pall Mall Magazine in October 1903, and "From Pole to Pole" about a tunnel connecting the Earth's poles, published in The Windsor Magazine in October 1904. Both were included in the Griffith short story collection "The Raid of Le Vengeur and Other Stories", edited by Moskowitz and published in 1974.

==== Final years ====
The twilight years of Griffith's career were marked by a return to the future war genre, a great quantity of such stories being produced towards the end of his life. The Lake of Gold, where the discovery of the titular reservoir results in a US syndicate conquering Europe, became the only one of Griffith's works to be serialized in a US magazine when it appeared in Argosy in eight instalments between December 1902 and July 1903, and was published in book format by White in 1903. The World Masters, where the US similarly establishes dominance by what The Encyclopedia of Science Fiction describes as a disintegrator ray, was published by John Long Ltd in 1903. The Stolen Submarine, about the then-ongoing Russo-Japanese War, was published by White in 1904. The year 1904 also saw the publication by John Long of A Criminal Croesus, where a war of South American unification is financed by a lost race that lives underground.

Virtually to his dying gasp, Griffith continued to dictate war after war, each to end all wars.

— Sam Moskowitz, Strange Horizons: The Spectrum of Science Fiction

Griffith's health was failing. With his finances likewise deteriorating as a result of decreasing book sales after 1904, he moved with his family to Port Erin on the Isle of Man where the cost of living was lower. He continued to write in spite of his worsening condition. Thus, when The Great Weather Syndicate—wherein weather control is weaponized—was published by White in May 1906, Griffith was largely confined to his bed. Griffith's last novel was The Lord of Labour, which he dictated on his deathbed against his doctor's advice. The story concerns a war between Britain and Germany, armed respectively with rifles firing explosive radium pellets and a ray that turns metals brittle. It was not published until nearly five years after his death, by White on 11 February 1911, the last of several posthumous works by Griffith.

=== Death ===
Griffith died at his home in Port Erin on 4 June 1906, at the age of 48. The death certificate listed his cause of death as cirrhosis of the liver. Moskowitz notes that malaria can have a similar clinical presentation; Griffith had contracted malaria in Hong Kong, and the literary biographer Peter Berresford Ellis writes that it at least contributed to his deteriorating condition. Moskowitz nevertheless concludes—primarily from Griffith's self-description as "a waterlogged derelict"—that his early death was most likely the result of alcoholism. As corroborating evidence, Moskowitz cites an increasing prominence of alcohol in Griffith's later works and the appearance of something akin to Alcoholics Anonymous in one of his books. Stableford, who similarly concludes that Griffith likely started consuming alcohol excessively no later than the mid-1890s, additionally points to what he describes as "a seemingly alcoholic quality about the garrulous fluency of his later works".

== Legacy ==
=== Place in science fiction history ===
It almost seemed as though there was a conspiracy to see that his name was obliterated from the literary record.

— Sam Moskowitz, writing in 1974 about the difficulty of locating the necessary information for a biography about Griffith.

In his time, Griffith was both successful and influential in his home country. Following the publication of The Angel of the Revolution in 1893, he was the most popular science fiction writer in England until the appearance of H. G. Wells's The Time Machine in 1895, and the best-selling one until Wells's The War of the Worlds was released in book format in 1898. E. F. Bleiler, in the 1990 reference work Science-Fiction: The Early Years, comments that Griffith may be considered the first professional English-language science fiction author. He is credited by among others The Encyclopedia of Science Fiction and Don D'Ammassa with shaping the burgeoning future war genre, in particular by engaging more with the political aspects, and Darren Harris-Fain similarly writes that he played a key role in the development of the scientific romance genre. More modestly, Brian Stableford writes that Griffith contributed to the establishment of a new literary niche and laid the groundwork for more sophisticated exponents of the craft, but concludes that it is likely that somebody else would have played that part if Griffith had not done so. On the subject of specific authors who were influenced by Griffith, Peter Berresford Ellis lists several including M. P. Shiel and Fred T. Jane, and Sam Moskowitz posits that George du Maurier drew direct inspiration from The Angel of the Revolution sequence for Trilby (1895) and The Martian (1898). The Historical Dictionary of Science Fiction credits Griffith with the first known use of several terms, including "death ray", "homeworld", and "space explorer".

In spite of all this, Griffith and his works have now descended into obscurity, something several modern writers have remarked upon as being peculiar. A commonly cited explanation is that his works were timely but not timeless; Moskowitz writes that "He has not survived because his literary output was for the most part a reflection, not a shaper, of the feelings of the period. He danced to the beat of the nearest drummer." The antiquarian bookseller Jeremy Parrott comments that the outbreak of World War I in 1914, along with the development of powered flight and emergence of submarine warfare, quickly rendered Griffith's visions of the future obsolete. Robert Godwin and the publishing house Collector's Guide Publishing further attribute it in part to the bankruptcy of the Tower Publishing Company in 1896 leaving his successful first three novels without a publisher thereafter. Griffith's failure to establish himself in the US has also been proposed as a contributing factor.

=== Literary proficiency ===
Later appraisals of Griffith's skill as a writer have often found it to be lacking. Bleiler summarizes Griffith as "Historically important, but a bad writer technically"; Harris-Fain outlines his principal failings as "an uninspired, if not clichéd, style, poor characterization, weak ideas, and repetition". Stableford calls Griffith "rather inept" and views him as lacking originality, noting that he would often name his sources of inspiration outright; The Encyclopedia of Science Fiction similarly describes him as borrowing themes "more conspicuously from earlier texts than was the custom then". Many have noted an apparent prioritization of quantity over quality especially in the later years of his career, and his earlier works are commonly regarded as broadly superior to his later ones, with some critics such as Stableford and Darko Suvin opining that he peaked as early as his debut novels in The Angel of the Revolution sequence. Stableford comments that Griffith's second novel Olga Romanoff left no room for further escalation in scope, and that toning the extravagance down for later works drained his stories of their initial vibrancy. Michael Moorcock, in the introduction to the 1975 anthology Before Armageddon, calls Griffith "the first 'professional' science-fiction writer", inasmuch as he wrote primarily for money and in service of his employers, and comments that "any integrity that his earlier fiction had possessed was soon lost". The serial format has also been noted as detrimental to the quality of several of his works: they were written piece-by-piece to meet tight deadlines and provide cliffhangers, which resulted in uneven pacing, poor structure, and unsatisfying resolutions. Stableford further identifies Griffith's apparent alcoholism as a likely cause of declining quality over time.

Among Griffith's strengths, a certain prescience is often cited. John McNabb writes that "Griffith was conscious of the possibilities of science and his technological descriptions were informed by contemporary debate". He is noted for predicting technologies that had not yet been invented; among these are heavier-than-air aircraft, radar, sonar, and air-to-surface missiles. He is similarly credited with anticipating developments in warfare, in particular the coming importance of aerial warfare, but also in terms of military tactics including the use of poison gas. He is recognized as having correctly predicted the outbreak of the Boer War, though Moskowitz comments that this did not require particularly keen foresight. Ellis writes that while Griffith's repeated motif of a war between Britain and the US never came to pass, it has since been revealed that both countries did in fact plan for such an eventuality up until the lead-up to World War II. Godwin finds Griffith to display a keen understanding of various concepts relevant to space travel in A Honeymoon in Space, (Note: Including the required properties of space suits, the effects of zero gravity, and the use of gravity assist maneuvers. Godwin also notes the early appearance of something similar to a black hole.) and credits him with inventing the countdown to zero in "The Great Crellin Comet". Beyond this, Moskowitz finds Griffith to exhibit "a fine imagination, a reasonably good flair for characterization, and an excellent storyteller's sense of pace" while acknowledging that he lacked "the literary touch". McNabb similarly opines that "what Griffith lacked in literary style, he made up for in imaginative and exuberant story telling", comparing him in this regard to Edgar Rice Burroughs. Moskowitz and Ellis both commend Griffith for portraying women as equals to men, commenting that he was ahead of his contemporaries on that point. Barbara Arnett Melchiori, by contrast, finds Griffith to portray women as little more than the private property of men.

=== In relation to H. G. Wells ===
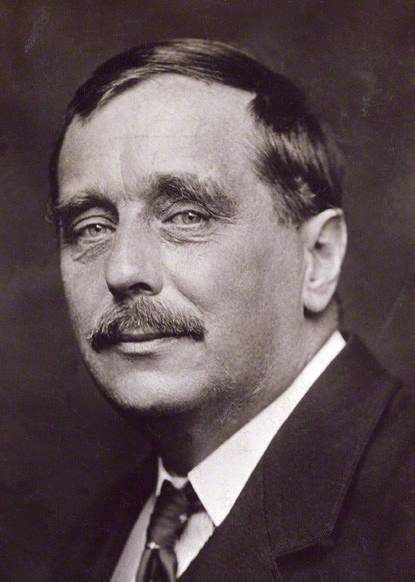
H. G. Wells (1866–1946), Griffith's principal literary rival

During Griffith's lifetime, comparisons were frequently made between his works and those of H. G. Wells—to the chagrin of Wells, who viewed himself as producing literature of a higher class than Griffith. Wells reviewed Griffith's The Outlaws of the Air in Saturday Review in 1895, finding it passable but not living up to its potential. Wells quickly overtook Griffith in reputation, and The Encyclopedia of Science Fiction writes that Griffith attempted in vain to garner critical praise by covering different literary ground in order to get out of Wells's shadow.

Comparisons have continued to be made long after both men's deaths. Wells is known to have read Griffith's works and is widely believed by scholars on Griffith to have been influenced by them. Scholars on Wells, by contrast, usually do not consider Griffith to have been an important influence. Wells's The War in the Air (1908) contains a passage that describes Griffith's The Outlaws of the Air as an "aeronautic classic"; Griffith's biographer Moskowitz takes this as evidence that Wells held professional respect for Griffith, while Harry Wood in The Wellsian: The Journal of the H. G. Wells Society instead interprets the apparent praise as backhanded. Wood argues that although the two were contemporaries chronologically, that term may be considered inappropriate when considering their ideological differences, with Griffith embodying Victorian ideals and Wells embracing Edwardian ones. Says Wood, "Where Wells critically analysed the present and offered shrewd insight on the future, Griffith celebrated the present as the glorious inheritance of a reified Victorian past". Wood nevertheless identifies several similarities in their works, including a focus on speculative aeronautics with a grounding in contemporary science and the use of fiction as a vehicle for social commentary. Steven Mollmann, in a 2015 Science Fiction Studies article comparing The Angel of the Revolution and The War in the Air, characterizes both books as examples of what he terms "revolutionary sf", where technological revolution (here in the form of airships) brings about political revolution.

Wells is generally regarded as the superior writer. Harris-Fain states that while both writers had "imaginative ideas and exciting stories", only Wells was able to incorporate "serious themes and philosophical speculations". Wood and Mollmann both comment that Wells more accurately predicted the future of warfare than did Griffith. Wood focuses on Wells depicting aerial warfare as insufficient to maintain control on the ground and draws comparisons to strategic bombing during World War II. Mollmann focuses on Wells portraying technological developments being adopted by all warring parties roughly at the same time—thus leading to more destructive warfare but not to anybody having a decisive technological advantage—and draws comparisons to World War I.

== Personal views ==
=== Religion ===
There was, without a doubt, a streak of messianism in Griffith and he held, at one time, strong political beliefs. But after he had been working for a while for Pearson he had, in common with most journalists of his kind, probably left most ideals behind him, and his work was dictated entirely by the demands of his publishers.

— Michael Moorcock, Before Armageddon

Griffith was irreligious, (Note: Variously described by later writers as atheist, agnostic, and having "embraced no religion".) and in his youth he wrote for the freethinker magazine Secular Review. Stableford comments that being a freethinker whose father was a clergyman was a background Griffith shared with many other scientific romance authors. He advocated fiercely for secularism as a young man; Stableford writes that he evidently tempered his opinions on this later in his life, as he wrote the serial "Thou Shalt Not—" for a religious audience in Pearson's The Sunday Reader in 1899. Moskowitz further writes that Griffith appears to have taken up an interest in the occult in the later years of his life.

=== Politics ===
Early in his career, Griffith was an outspoken socialist. He incorporated his political views into his fiction, and much has been written about what can be gleaned from his writings about his viewpoints. Melchiori writes that there are a number of inconsistencies in his debut novel The Angel of the Revolution which indicate to her that Griffith "had by no means fully absorbed the doctrine that he was preaching". In particular, Melchiori highlights Griffith's vision of the abolition of private property as incomplete, suggesting that the concept was so deeply ingrained in his worldview that he could not properly imagine its absence. Bleiler similarly describes Griffith's works as characterized by "ambivalence toward various social movements of the day". Stableford writes that Griffith's works reveal a successive shift to increasingly right-leaning sympathies, with anarchists being portrayed positively alongside socialists in his very earliest stories but quickly rejected afterwards, and the socialists in turn being displaced by capitalists in the later works.

=== Social matters ===
[...] a brief and simple service of thanksgiving for the victory which had wiped the stain of foreign invasion from the soil of Britain in the blood of the invader, and given the control of the destinies of the Western world finally into the hands of the dominant race on earth.

— George Griffith, The Angel of the Revolution (1893)

On Griffith's social views, Stableford contrasts Griffith's gradually shifting views on economics with the observation that he consistently portrayed aristocrats positively from the very start. Wood writes that "Griffith's fiction celebrates social conservatism and British global predominance, preaching the maintenance of this status quo". McNabb identifies themes of social Darwinism, eugenics, and outright race war, while commenting that there is a notable lack of the antisemitism that often accompanied such stories. He writes that Griffith's works reinforced then-common beliefs among his readers about their own inherent superiority. Melchiori similarly says about Griffith's views on internationalism that "In theory he accepts it, but in practice he is very strongly pro-British", and Wood comments that "Irishness could only exist for Griffith, it seems, as a constituent part of Britishness". Bleiler summarizes Griffith as "in ideology, the embodiment of what was wrong with the British Victorian Weltanschauung".

== Publications ==
=== Poetry collections ===
Year	Title	Publisher	Notes	Ref.
1883	Poems General, Secular, and Satirical	W. Stewart & Co.	as Lara	
1884	The Dying Faith	W. Stewart & Co.	as Lara	

=== Novels ===
Year	Title	Publisher	Notes	Ref.
1893	The Angel of the Revolution: A Tale of the Coming Terror	Tower Publishing Company	originally serialized in Pearson's Weekly, 21 January – 14 October 1893	
1894	Olga Romanoff; or, The Syren of the Skies	Tower Publishing Company	originally serialized as The Syren of the Skies in Pearson's Weekly, 30 December 1893 – 4 August 1894	
1895	The Outlaws of the Air	Tower Publishing Company	originally serialized in Short Stories, 8 September 1894 – 23 March 1895	
1895	Valdar the Oft-Born: A Saga of Seven Ages	C. Arthur Pearson Ltd	originally serialized in Pearson's Weekly, 2 February – 24 August 1895	
1897	Briton or Boer? A Tale of the Fight for Africa	F. V. White	originally serialized in Pearson's Weekly, 1 August 1896 – 9 January 1897	
1897	The Knights of the White Rose	F. V. White	originally serialized in Pearson's Story Teller	
1897	The Romance of Golden Star	F. V. White	originally serialized as Golden Star in Short Stories, 7 September – 21 December 1895	
1898	The Virgin of the Sun: A Tale of the Conquest of Peru	C. Arthur Pearson Ltd		
1898	The Destined Maid	F. V. White		
1898	The Gold-Finder	F. V. White	originally serialized as The Gold Magnet in Short Stories, 1897	
1899	The Great Pirate Syndicate	F. V. White	originally serialized in Pick-Me-Up, 19 February – 23 July 1898	
1899	The Rose of Judah: A Tale of the Captivity	C. Arthur Pearson Ltd	originally serialized in Pearson's Weekly, 8 October 1898 – 28 January 1899	
1900	"Thou Shalt Not—"	C. Arthur Pearson Ltd	as Stanton Morich; originally serialized in The Sunday Reader, 1899	
1900	Brothers of the Chain	F. V. White		
1901	Denver's Double: A Story of Inverted Identity	F. V. White		
1901	The Justice of Revenge	F. V. White		
1901	Captain Ishmael: A Saga of the South Seas	Hutchinson		
1901	A Honeymoon in Space	C. Arthur Pearson Ltd	originally serialized as Stories of Other Worlds in Pearson's Magazine, January–July 1900	
1902	The Missionary	F. V. White		
1902	The White Witch of Mayfair	F. V. White		
1903	The Lake of Gold: A Narrative of the Anglo-American Conquest of Europe	F. V. White	originally serialized in Argosy, December 1902 – July 1903	
1903	A Woman Against the World	F. V. White		
1903	The World Masters	John Long Ltd		
1904	A Criminal Croesus	John Long Ltd		
1904	The Stolen Submarine: A Tale of the Russo-Japanese War	F. V. White		
1905	His Better Half	F. V. White		
1905	An Island Love Story	F. V. White		
1905	A Mayfair Magician: A Romance of Criminal Science	F. V. White	expanded from the earlier short story "The Searcher of Souls"	
1906	A Conquest of Fortune	F. V. White		
1906	The Great Weather Syndicate	F. V. White		
1906	His Beautiful Client	F. V. White		
1906	The Mummy and Miss Nitocris: A Phantasy of the Fourth Dimension	T. Werner Laurie	expanded from the earlier short stories "The Vengeance of Nitocris" and "The Conversion of the Professor"	
1907	The World Peril of 1910	F. V. White	expanded from the earlier short story "The Great Crellin Comet"	
1908	John Brown, Buccaneer	F. V. White		
1908	The Sacred Skull	Everett & Co.		
1911	The Lord of Labour	F. V. White	last work written and last work published (posthumously)	

=== Short stories ===
Year	Issue	Title	Publication	Notes	Ref.
1894	January 27	"A Gamble with Destiny"	Pearson's Weekly	as Levin Carnac	
1894	February 3	"The General's Gloves"	Pearson's Weekly	as Levin Carnac	
1894	February 10	"Up a Gum Tree"	Short Stories		
1894	February 17	"Jonah's Yarn"	Pearson's Weekly	as Levin Carnac	
1894	March 3	"A Romance of the Hills"	Pearson's Weekly	as Levin Carnac	
1894	July 21	"The True Fate of the 'Flying Dutchman'"	Pearson's Weekly	as Levin Carnac	
1894	Christmas	"The Romance of Rajah Mountain"	Pearson's Weekly		
1895	April 6	"A Woman's Justice"	Pearson's Weekly	as Levin Carnac	
1895	April 13	"The Cruise of the 'Hampshire Maid'"	Pearson's Weekly	as Levin Carnac	
1895	April 20	"The Heroine of Six Mile Creek"	Pearson's Weekly	as Levin Carnac	
1895	April 27	"A True Tale of the 48"	Pearson's Weekly	as Levin Carnac	
1895	May 4	"The Tragedy of Old Man Porter"	Pearson's Weekly	as Levin Carnac	
1895	May 11	"The Gold Plant"	Pearson's Weekly	as Levin Carnac	
1895	Christmas	"A Tale of Old Pompeii"	Pearson's Weekly		
1896	April	"A Photograph of the Invisible"	Pearson's Magazine		
1896	June	"A Genius for a Year"	Pearson's Magazine	as Levin Carnac	
1896	Christmas	"The Vengeance of Nitocris"	Pearson's Weekly	incorporated alongside "The Conversion of the Professor" into The Mummy and Miss Nitocris in 1906	
1897	July	"The Diamond Dog"	Pearson's Magazine	first of several connected "I.D.B." (illicit diamond buying) stories	
1897	August	"A Run to Freetown"	Pearson's Magazine	"I.D.B." story	
1897	September	"The King's Rose Diamond"	Pearson's Magazine	"I.D.B." story	
1897	October	"The Finding of Diamond Pan"	Pearson's Magazine	"I.D.B." story	
1897	November	"Five Hundred Carats"	Pearson's Magazine	"I.D.B." story	
1897	December	"The Border Gang"	Pearson's Magazine	"I.D.B." story	
1897	Christmas	"The Great Crellin Comet"	Pearson's Weekly	later expanded into the posthumously-published 1907 novel The World Peril of 1910	
1898	March	"A Corner in Lightning"	Pearson's Magazine		
1898	July	"At the Sign of the 'Golden Star'"	Pearson's Magazine	"I.D.B." story	
1898	July 30	"A Woman Scorned"	Pick-Me-Up	as Levin Carnac	
1898	August 6	"Hellville, U.S.A."	Pearson's Weekly		
1898	August 6	"Condemned by Circumstance"	Pearson's Weekly	as Levin Carnac	
1898	August 6	"A Double Rose"	Pick-Me-Up	as Levin Carnac	
1898	August 13	"La Giralda"	Pick-Me-Up	as Levin Carnac	
1898	August 20	"The Curse of Ham"	Pick-Me-Up	as Levin Carnac	
1898	August 27	"A Withered Rose-Leaf"	Pick-Me-Up	as Levin Carnac	
1898	September 3	"Lola's Two Lovers"	Pick-Me-Up	as Levin Carnac	
1898	September 10	"Some Notes from a Private Diary, which Speculates on Choruses and Muses"	Pick-Me-Up		
1898	October	"Beauty in Camp"	Pearson's Magazine	"I.D.B." story	
1898	Christmas	"The Veil of Tanit"	Pearson's Weekly		
1899	May	"The Conversion of the Professor"	Pearson's Magazine	incorporated alongside "The Vengeance of Nitocris" into The Mummy and Miss Nitocris in 1906	
1899	July	"The Plague Ship 'Tupisa'"	Pearson's Magazine		
1899	Christmas	"The Searcher of Souls"	Pearson's Weekly	later expanded into the 1905 novel A Mayfair Magician	
1901	February	"The Raid of 'Le Vengeur'"	Pearson's Magazine		
1903	October	"The Lost Elixir"	The Pall Mall Magazine		
1904	October	"From Pole to Pole"	The Windsor Magazine		

=== Short story collections ===
Year	Title	Publisher	Notes	Ref.
1894	A Heroine of the Slums	Tower Publishing Company		
1899	Gambles with Destiny	F. V. White		
1899	Knaves of Diamonds, Being Tales of Mine and Veld	C. Arthur Pearson Ltd	collection of "I.D.B." stories; reprinted as The Diamond Dog, 1913	

=== Non-fiction books ===
Year	Title	Publisher	Notes	Ref.
1897	Men Who Have Made the Empire	C. Arthur Pearson Ltd	originally published in 12 parts in Short Stories, 25 May – 10 August 1897	
1901	In an Unknown Prison Land: An Account of Convicts and Colonists in New Caledonia	Hutchinson		
1903	With Chamberlain through South Africa	George Routledge & Sons		
1903	Sidelights on Convict Life	John Long Ltd	originally published irregularly in Pearson's Magazine	
