= Fred T. Jane =

British writer and illustrator

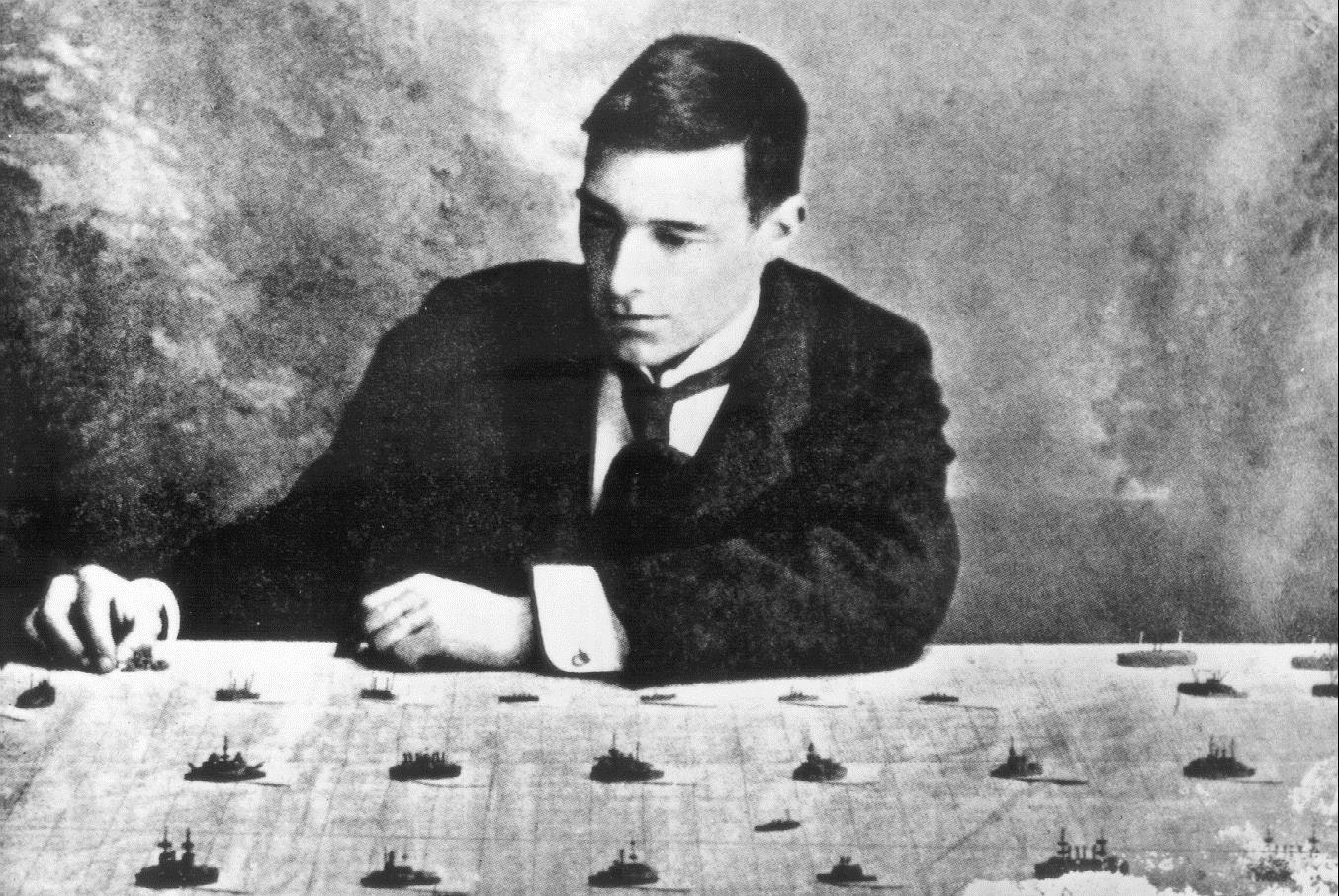
Fred T. Jane with his Naval War Game in 1898

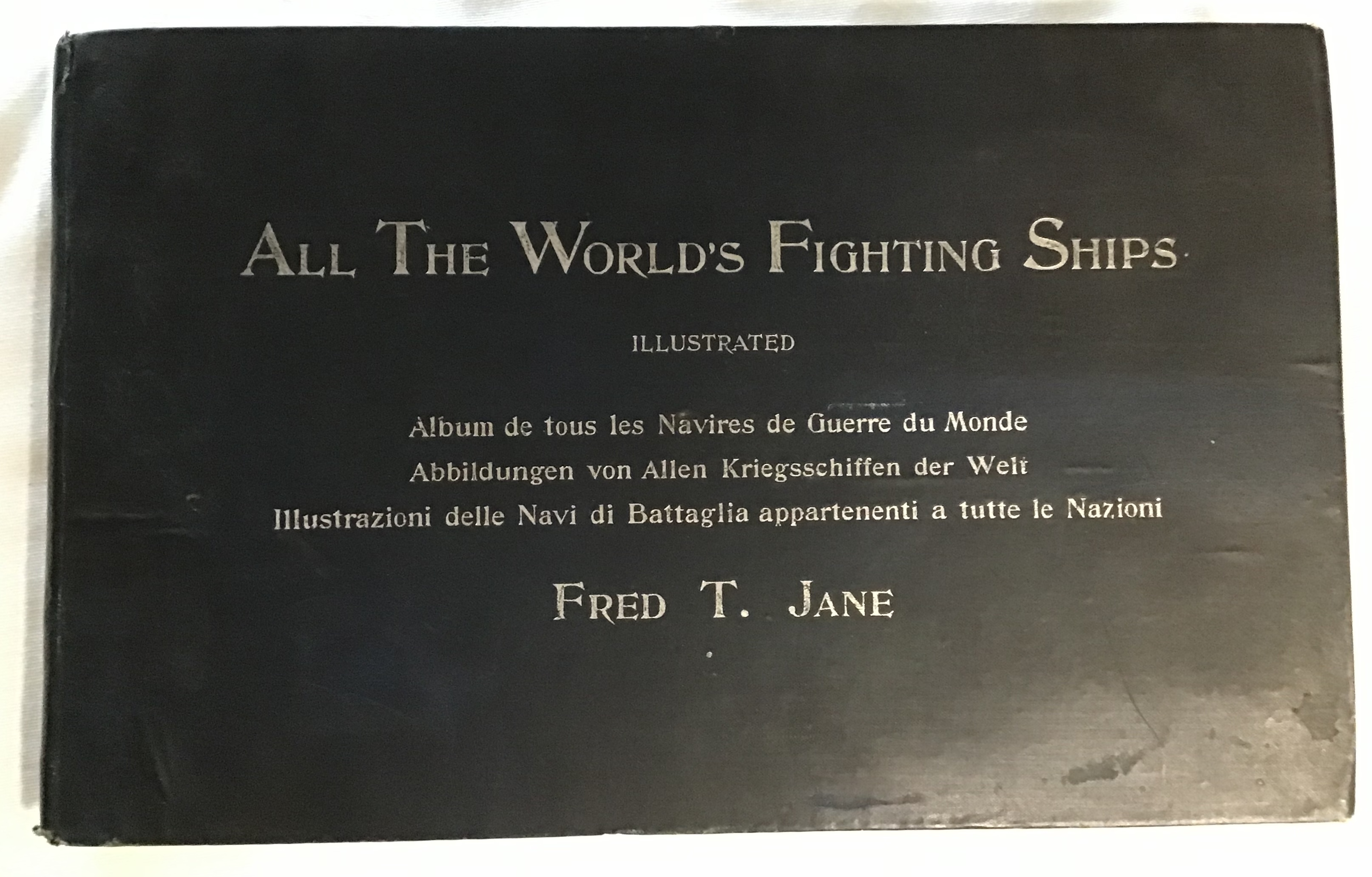
Cover of the first edition of All the World's Fighting Ships, 1898

John Fredrick Thomas Jane (6 August 1865 – 8 March 1916) was an English author, artist, war gamer, and founding editor of All the World's Fighting Ships and All the World's Airships.

== Biography ==
Jane was born in Richmond, Surrey, England, but worked most of his life in Portsmouth. His father was a Church of England vicar. He attended Exeter School. He first began to sketch warships in his teens. In the 1890s he illustrated scientific romances by George Griffith, as well as for his own science fiction novels, such as To Venus in Five Seconds (1897), and The Violet Flame (1899).

He produced illustrations on marine subjects for many illustrated magazines, typically providing a grisaille (monochrome) watercolour painting for reproduction. Many maritime disasters received dramatic coverage, and new types of warships were illustrated in calmer scenes.

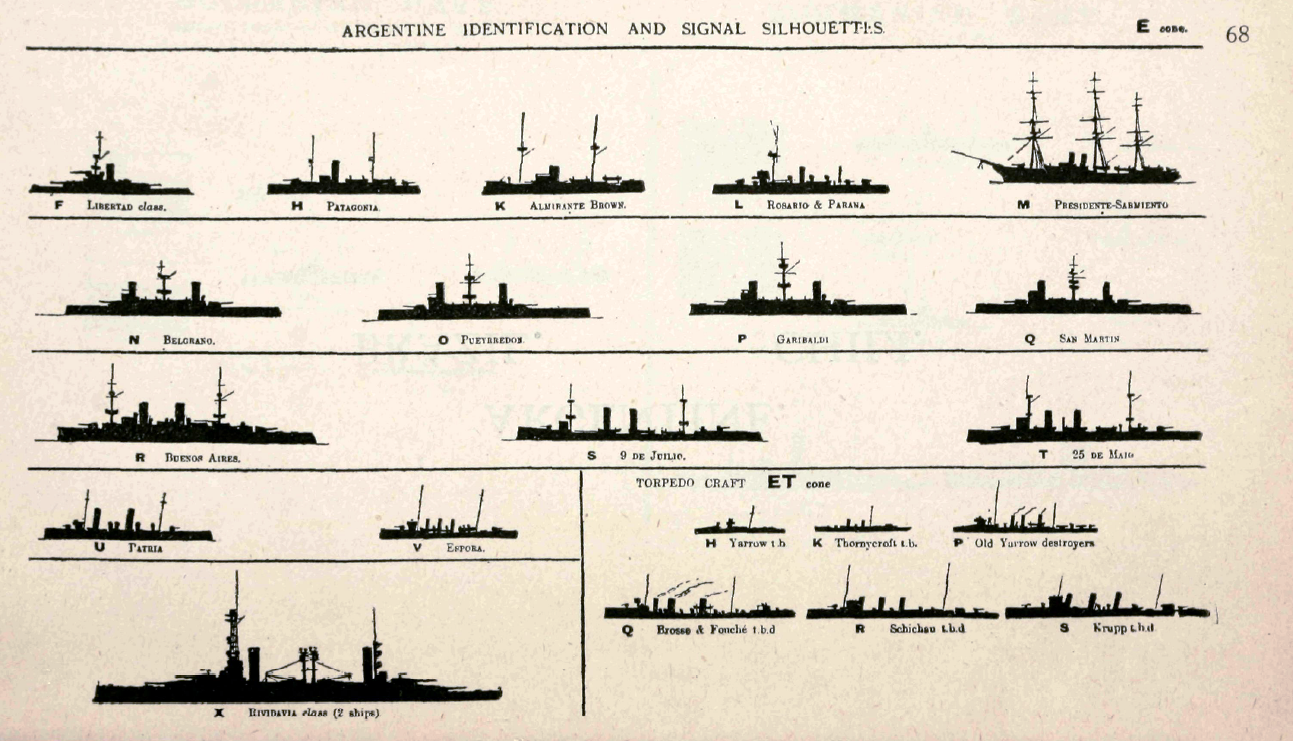
The clear silhouettes provided by Jane were an innovation to assist bridge crew with identification

Jane first published All the World's Fighting Ships (known as Jane's Fighting Ships after 1903) in 1898, which detailed the world's navies. It was an immediate success, becoming the standard reference work on the topic. The Naval Warrant Officer's Journal suggested that the book be on every ship, and in 1902 said that it should be available to every naval officer. The Admiralty were less enthusiastic, partly due to Jane's irreverent behaviour - although many ships did acquire copies. In 1898 he also published the Fred T. Jane, Rules for the Jane Naval War Game (London: Sampson Low, Marston and Company)

In 1909, he created All the World's Aircraft.

Jane's firm has passed through a number of ownership entities. The company is now owned by private equity firm Montagu Private Equity.

Jane was an accomplished maritime and naval artist, mostly in watercolour, whose works as an illustrator, often in grisaille (monochrome), were used in books and magazines; but he also produced paintings for sale.

He was also involved in politics, standing as an Independent candidate for Portsmouth in the 1906 general election. He was strongly opposed to the Liberal Party (especially its left wing) and when a left-wing Liberal candidate Edward Hemmerde was nominated in 1910, he arranged a stunt to disrupt their election campaign. At another public meeting, Jane arranged for a sailor to ask Hemmerde to insist on the supply of hammock ladders should he be elected: Hemmerde fell for this gag and gave the pledge. He also once kidnapped MP Victor Grayson in a political stunt.

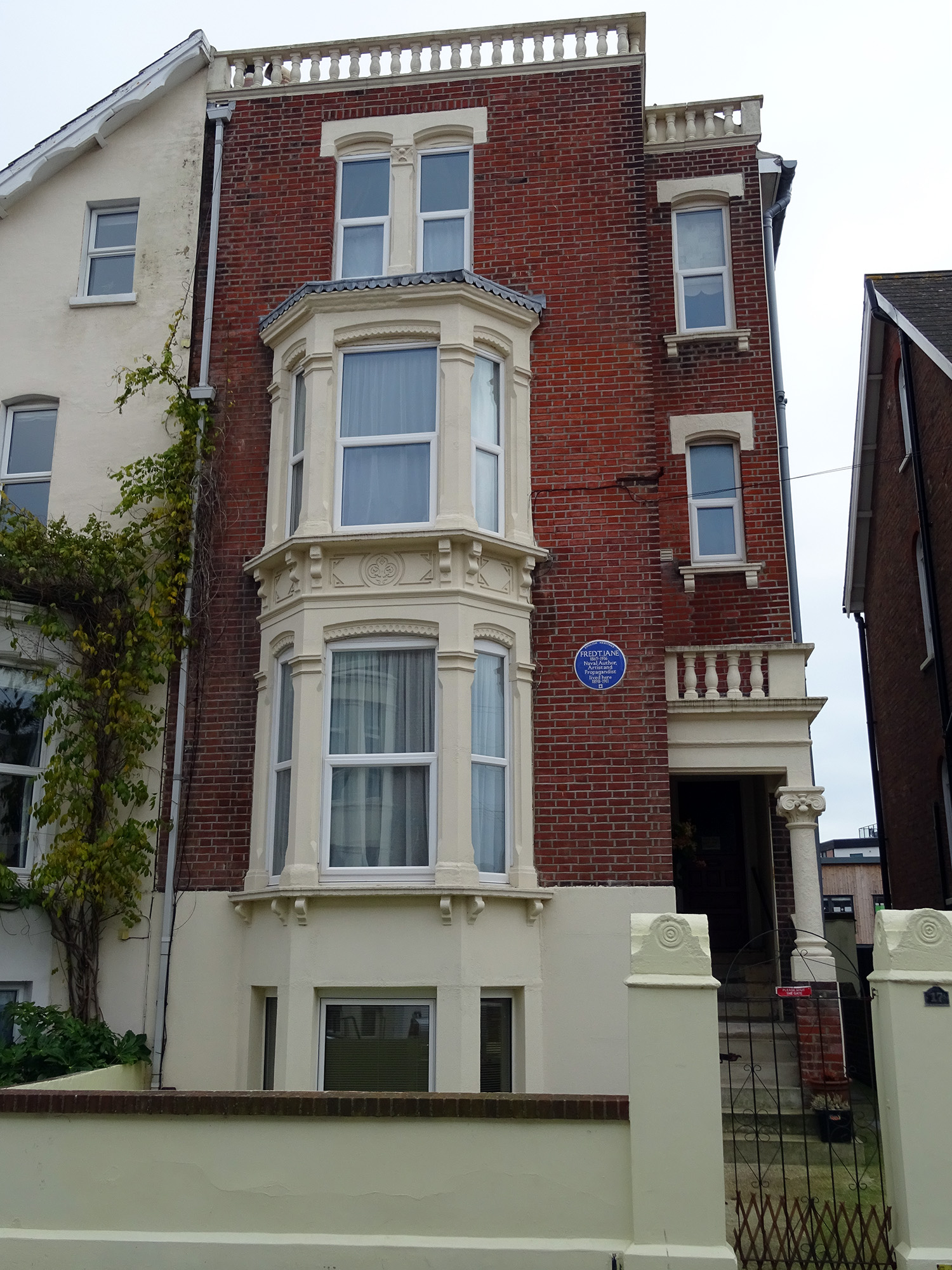
Blue plaque, 17 Elphinstone Road, Southsea (closeup)

His Portsmouth home, on Southsea Common, now bears a plaque recording that he lived there.

In later life Jane lived at Bedhampton, and was instrumental in setting up one of the first Boy Scout troops.

Jane's health had been in decline when he contracted an influenza virus in December 1915. Complications of this virus, and congestive heart failure, would shortly prove fatal. On March 8, 1916, Jane died at his home in Clarence Parade, Southsea, Portsmouth. He was survived by his second wife Muriel, and his daughter, Dorothy. He was buried with his first wife, Alice, in Highland Road Cemetery, Southsea.

== Legacy ==
Jane's Information Group, publisher of Jane's Defence Weekly and newer editions of Jane's All The World's Fighting Ships is named after Jane.

Jane's Combat Simulations, a brand of combat simulation video games, is named after him; licensed from Jane's Information Group.
