= Michael Rothwell =

Michael Rothwell may refer to:

- Michael Rothwell (actor) (1936–2009), British character actor
- Michael Rothwell (sailor) (born 1953), American sailor
