= Jennifer Gray =

Jennifer Gray may refer to:

- Jennifer Gray (actress), British actress
- Jennifer Gray (cricketer), Irish cricketer

== See also ==
- Jennifer Grey, American actress
