= Mystery and Imagination =

British television horror anthology series, 1966-1970

- Genre: Horror anthology
- Starring: David Buck
- Country of origin: United Kingdom
- Original language: English
- No. of series: 5
- No. of episodes: 24 (16 missing)

Production
- Production companies: ABC Weekend TV (Series 1–3); Thames Television (Series 4–5)

Original release
- Network: ITV
- Release: 29 January 1966 – 23 February 1970

Mystery and Imagination is a British television anthology series of classic horror and supernatural dramas. Five series were broadcast from 1966 to 1970 by the ITV network and produced by ABC and (later) Thames Television.

== Outline ==
The series featured television plays based on the works of well-known authors such as Robert Louis Stevenson, Bram Stoker, Mary Shelley, M. R. James, and Edgar Allan Poe. All bar one of the first two ABC series starred David Buck as Richard Beckett, originally a character from Sheridan Le Fanu's story "The Flying Dragon", as narrator. Beckett was made the central character of the series, taking the roles of various characters from some of the original stories. The first two series, although transmitted as two separate runs, were recorded in a single production block. The episode without Buck as the lead ("The Open Door") features Jack Hawkins. Unlike BBC dramas from the period, location exterior shots were also recorded onto video tape rather than 16mm film, giving a more consistent look to the production. Only series 5 was videotaped in colour.

== Episodes ==
=== Series 1 ===
No. overall	No. in series	Title	Source	Cast	Original release date
1	1	"The Lost Stradivarius"	J. Meade Falkner's The Lost Stradivarius (1895)	Edward Brayshaw, Jeremy Brett, David Buck, Patricia Garwood, Joyce Heron and Angela Morant.	29 January 1966
2	2	"The Body Snatcher"	Robert Louis Stevenson's "The Body Snatcher" from The Pall Mall Gazette (December 1884)	Trevor Baxter, James Cossins, David Buck, John Garrie, Michael Gwynn, Ian Holm and Dermot Tuohy.	5 February 1966
3	3	"The Fall of the House of Usher"	Edgar Allan Poe's "The Fall of the House of Usher" from Burton's Gentleman's Magazine (1839)	David Buck, Susannah York, Denholm Elliott, Mary Miller, Oliver McGreevy and Dudley Jones.	12 February 1966
4	4	"The Open Door"	Margaret Oliphant's "The Open Door" from Blackwood's Magazine (January 1882)	Jack Hawkins, Rachel Gurney, Mark Dignam, John Laurie, Geoffrey Sumner and Amanda Walker.	19 February 1966
5	5	"The Tractate Middoth"	M.R. James' "The Tractate Middoth" from More Ghost Stories of an Antiquary (1911)	David Buck, Jerry Verno, Marian Diamond, Barbara Lott, Tim Preece, Edwin Finn, Robert Hunter and Will Stampe.	26 February 1966
6	6	"Lost Hearts"	M.R. James' "Lost Hearts" from The Pall Mall Magazine (1895)	David Buck, Megs Jenkins, Freddie Jones, Richard Pearson and David Dodimead.	5 March 1966
7	7	"The Canterville Ghost"	Oscar Wilde's "The Canterville Ghost" from The Court and Society Review (February 1887)	David Buck, David Bauer, Eleanor Bron, Bruce Forsyth, Libby Morris and Angela Thorne.	12 March 1966

=== Series 2 ===
No. overall	No. in series	Title	Source	Cast	Original release date
8	1	"Room 13"	M.R. James' "Number 13" from Ghost Stories of an Antiquary (1904)	Joss Ackland, David Battley, David Buck, George Woodbridge, Tessa Wyatt	22 October 1966
9	2	"The Beckoning Shadow"	Charlotte Riddell's "Old Mrs Jones" from Weird Stories (1882)	David Buck, Elizabeth Knight, Larry Noble, Geoffrey Palmer, Edwin Richfield, John Ronane and Toni Palmer.	29 October 1966
10	3	"The Flying Dragon"	Sheridan Le Fanu's "The Room in the Dragon Volant" from In a Glass Darkly (1872)	John Bryans, David Buck, Mark Burns, John Franklyn-Robbins, Robert James, John Moffatt, Aubrey Morris, John Phillips.	5 November 1966
11	4	"Carmilla"	Sheridan Le Fanu's Carmilla (1872)	Terence Bayler, Vernon Dobtcheff, David Buck, Sonia Dresdel, Roy Marsden, Jane Merrow, Joseph O'Conor	12 November 1966
12	5	"The Phantom Lover"	Vernon Lee's A Phantom Lover: A Fantastic Story (1886)	Robert Hardy, Virginia McKenna, John Sharp.	19 November 1966

=== Series 3 ===
No. overall	No. in series	Title	Source	Cast	Original release date
13	1	"Casting the Runes"	M.R. James' "Casting the Runes" from More Ghost Stories of an Antiquary (1911)	Robert Eddison, Neal Arden, John Barrett, John Fraser, Gordon Jackson and Robert Hunter.	22 March 1968
14	2	"The Listener"	Algernon Blackwood's "The Listener" from The Listener and Other Stories (1907)	Clifford Rose, John Savident, Edward Woodward and Colette O'Neil.	29 March 1968
15	3	"A Place of One's Own"	Osbert Sitwell's A Place of One's Own (1940)	Joss Ackland, Margaret Courtenay, Kim Goody, Megs Jenkins, Viola Keats, Meg Wynn Owen, Michael Trubshawe.	5 April 1968
16	4	"The Devil's Piper"	Sir Walter Scott's "Wandering Willie's Tale", a fragment from Redgauntlet (1824)	Archie Duncan, Ian Fleming, Robert James, Alex McCrindle, Robert Urquhart and Roddy McMillan.	11 April 1968
17	5	"The Telltale Heart"	Edgar Allan Poe's "The Tell-Tale Heart" from The Pioneer (January 1843)	Norman Eshley, Bob Hornery, Freddie Jones, Leslie French and Antony Webb.	20 June 1968
18	6	"Feet Foremost"	L. P. Hartley's "Feet Foremost" from The Killing Bottle (1932)	Trevor Baxter, Douglas Fielding, Clive Morton, Fanny Rowe, Neil Stacy, Fiona Walker, Timothy West.	27 June 1968

=== Series 4 ===
No. overall	No. in series	Title	Source	Cast	Original release date
19	1	"Uncle Silas"	Sheridan Le Fanu's Uncle Silas (1864)	Robert Eddison, Patience Collier, Lucy Fleming, Gwendolyn Watts, John Welsh, Dudley Sutton, Lally Bowers, Christine Noonan, Gilbert Wynne, Michael Lynch and Roy Godfrey.	4 November 1968
20	2	"Frankenstein"	Mary Shelley's Frankenstein (1818)	Ian Holm, Richard Vernon, Neil Stacy, Sarah Badel, Meg Wynn Owen, Morag Hood and Robert Hunter.	11 November 1968
21	3	"Dracula"	Bram Stoker's Dracula (1897)	Denholm Elliott, James Maxwell, Corin Redgrave, Suzanne Neve, Bernard Archard, Joan Hickson, Susan George, Margaret Nolan.	18 November 1968

=== Series 5 ===
No. overall	No. in series	Title	Source	Cast	Original release date
22	1	"The Suicide Club"	Robert Louis Stevenson's The Suicide Club (1878)	Bernard Archard, David Collings, Ronald Adam, Jonathan Newth, Roger Booth, Ivor Danvers and Clyde Pollitt.	9 February 1970
23	2	"Sweeney Todd"	James Malcolm Rymer's The String of Pearls (1846-1847), adaptation by Vincent Tilsey.	Freddie Jones, Peter Sallis, Russell Hunter, Lewis Fiander, Mel Martin, Barry Stanton, Charles Morgan.	16 February 1970
24	3	"The Curse of the Mummy"	Bram Stoker's The Jewel of Seven Stars (1903)	Isobel Black, Patrick Mower, Donald Churchill, Graham Crowden, Nik Zaran and Gerald Martin.	23 February 1970

== Archive status and availability ==
Of the episodes from the ABC era, only the versions of "The Fall of the House of Usher" and "The Open Door" (series 1) have survived. All the other episodes from the first three series are not known to exist, although the Thames episodes (series 4 and 5) survive. A brief clip from "Casting the Runes" (from series 3) also exists. Domestic audio recordings of the otherwise missing episodes "The Lost Stradivarius", "The Body Snatcher", "The Tractate Middoth", "Lost Hearts", "The Canterville Ghost" and "Room 13" also exist. These recordings have been uploaded to YouTube.

On 5 July 2010, Network released all eight remaining episodes on a four disc DVD set along with the surviving clip of "Casting the Runes". Kaleidoscope/TV Brain have released some of the off-air audio recordings from the missing episodes on DVD alongside some audio recordings from some of the missing episodes of the TV series Public Eye.

== Reception ==
=== Critical response ===
Jon E. Lewis and Penny Stempel described Mystery and Imagination as a series of "nightmare tales of crime and the supernatural", noting that its episodes were "spine‑chillingly scripted and shot" and "only to be viewed with the lights on".

Kim Newman of Empire gave the series four stars out of five and wrote: "This collects the surviving eight episodes of ITV's flagship "quality" horror show of the 1960s and early 1970s. You get Denholm Elliott as both Dracula (with Susan George as his most fetching victim) and Roderick Usher (with Susannah York as mad Madeleine), Ian Holm as Frankenstein and (in rare but logical casting) his own Monster, Jack Hawkins haunted by a child, Patrick Mower and Isobel Black suffering The Curse Of The Mummy and, best of all, fine old slyly sent-up melodrama in Uncle Silas. Mostly studio-bound, it has fine writing and acting, but The Fall Of The House Of Usher isn't the only episode in which the sets seem ready to tumble".

Laurence Marcus of Television Heaven described stories of the series with having "original magic and power".
