= Rentadick =

1972 British film by Jim Clark

- Theatrical release poster
- Directed by: Jim Clark
- Written by: John Cleese; Graham Chapman; John Fortune; John Wells
- Produced by: Ned Sherrin; Terry Glinwood
- Starring: James Booth; Richard Briers; Julie Ege; Ronald Fraser; Donald Sinden
- Cinematography: John Coquillon
- Edited by: Martin Charles
- Music by: Carl Davis
- Production companies: Virgin Films; David Paradine Productions
- Distributed by: Rank Film Distributors
- Release date: 1972
- Running time: 94 minutes
- Country: United Kingdom
- Language: English

Rentadick is a 1972 British comedy film, directed by Jim Clark and starring James Booth, Richard Briers, Julie Ege, Ronald Fraser, and Donald Sinden. It is a spoof spy/detective picture, the plot of which involves attempts to protect a new experimental nerve gas. The film was based on a script by John Cleese and Graham Chapman but was greatly changed and has been described as "a missed opportunity."

== Cast ==
- James Booth as Simon Hamilton
- Richard Briers as Miles Gannet
- Julie Ege as Utta Armitage
- Ronald Fraser as Major Upton
- Donald Sinden as Jeffrey Armitage
- Tsai Chin as Madam Greenfly
- Kenneth Cope as West
- John Wells as Owltruss
- Spike Milligan as customs officer
- Winnie Holman as maid
- Patsy Crowther as old lady
- Patricia Quinn as chauffeuse
- Michael Rothwell as removal man
- Michael Sharvell-Martin as removal man
- Richard Beckinsale as Hobbs
- Derek Griffiths as Henson
- Leon Sinden as Police Inspector
- Cheryl Hall as Maxine
- Michael Bentine as Husein
- Penelope Keith as Reporter

== Production ==
=== Development ===
The original script for the film was called Rentasleuth and was written by Graham Chapman and John Cleese, both of Monty Python, who developed it for producer David Frost. Chapman and Cleese were looking for a director and sought Charles Crichton, whose movies Cleese greatly admired, even admitting to stealing the end for Rentasleuth from The Lavender Hill Mob. Cleese says Crichton was of great assistance helping them with the script:

His expertise was breathtaking to us guys. He would leave us in the evening, and by the time he saw us in the morning, he'd push a piece of paper toward us and say I had a few thoughts last night, but I don't think they're any good.' And you realized he'd solved the problem, put in two jokes, and taken out half a page. He was just that expert on a level that Gray and I had never encountered before. We just loved him.

The cast was to be Ronnie Barker, Ronnie Corbett, Tim Brooke-Taylor, John Cleese, Graham Chapman and Marty Feldman (in the role of ‘Owltruss’). In April 1971 it was announced Cleese would star in the film, to be called Rentasleuth.

Frost failed to secure finance, so he sold the script to producer Ned Sherrin. Sherrin wrote in his memoirs that "Frost had paid richly for the script. With little prospect of getting together the money to film it, he was anxious to offload it. The prospect of a screenplay by Cleese and Chapman tailored to the Python team, whom we understood were keen to be in it, was exciting." (Cleese later said this comment was inaccurate, as the only Pythons involved in the film were him and Chapman.)

According to Sherrin, once the producer bought the script, the Pythons no longer wanted to be involved in the film forcing him to assemble a new cast. Cleese says they left the project because Sherrin did not want to use Charles Crichton as director. "We just didn't know why, and we never quite got an answer out of him," said Cleese. "He just didn't want to."

Intead Sherrin wanted to use Jim Clark as director and showed Cleese and Chapman a film Clark had made. Cleese called Clark "a very good editor" but "we didn't think Jim showed much understanding of how to direct comedy, except for pastiche — he did pastiche very well, because he was an editor with a wonderful eye. But he just didn't have a sense of how to work with actors on an original comedy." Sherrin insisted on Clark, so Chapman and Cleese left the project, as did the cast they had assembled.

Sherrin collected a new cast and said John Fortune and John Wells "did a little tailoring on the script."

Sherrin says Graham Dowson, the "heir apparent" to John Davis of Rank, who wondered why Sherrin had not made a film for that Organisation. Sherrin said he had a script and made an appointment with Frank Poole, who ran filmmaking for Rank, Rank agreed to finance. (Sherrin wrote "I got the impression from Graham that he indulged occasionally in a film project and this might be his annual treat. He also confessed ruefully that his other pet projects had rarely been winners.")

Jim Clark wrote in his memoirs that Sherrin offered him the script to direct when Clark was working on X Y & Zee (1972). Clark said he did not "remember the original script" but "in any case I wasn’t going to flounce out of this since I was keen to return to directing and found most of the revamped film amusing. It was a reasonably cheap film."

The script was retitled on the first day of shooting to Rentadick which Clark felt was a terrible title. It sounded like a gay porno movie." Clark later said, "it was a mystery that I was seen as a director of comedy, but the legacy of the Will Hay and George Formby comedies hung over me."

=== Shooting ===
Filming took six weeks mostly at place at a country house near Elstree Studios. Clark was influenced by the Will Hay comedy Ask a Policeman (1939). He wrote "Unfortunately I didn’t have the trio of comics, Hay, Marriott, and Moffat, to work with. But despite the many problems and my almost total inability to pull it off, I enjoyed directing the film and did not think it too bad."

Tsai Chin, who played a small role, recalled it "was great fun to make, because in the Carry On tradition the film starred all the British comic talents of its day: Spike Milligan, Frankie Howerd, and Donald Sinden, to name a few."

=== Cleese and Chapman remove names ===
After watching a screening of the movie, Chapman and Cleese instigated action to have their names removed from the finished print. Chapman wrote "Otherwise we would have felt like accessories to the theft of our own valuables. I am convinced that the original script could still be filmed: the connection between it and the one Mr Sherrin had produced would be unnoticeable."

This left Rentadick with very peculiar on-screen acknowledgements, the only writing credit is given to Fortune and Wells, who are explicitly credited only with "additional dialogue." Chapman referred to Fortune and Wells in his memoirs as "Jim Viles and Kurt Loggerhead."

However, the British company Network released a DVD in 2007 using a print that still shows the names of Cleese and Chapman during the opening titles (frames at 2:00 minutes into the presentation) and uses their names in its promotional material.

== Reception ==
Clark says the film previewed well but it was "slaughtered by the critics and nobody saw the film, which comes up regularly on late night television to embarrass me."

=== Box office ===
Sherrin says Rank lost its entire investment.

=== Critical response ===
According to Sherrin, "The film starts promisingly but somehow along the way the mixture of nonsense which Cleese and Chapman had concocted fails to rise."

Cleese called the film "a stinker" and Sherrin a "tasteless, slimy and incompetent" man, who "shortly afterwards... tried to cheat us financially... The one thing I’m grateful for is that Sherrin was still alive and kicking when Charlie won his Oscar nomination for Best Director for Wanda."

The Evening Standard called it "an abysmally unfunny series of episodes."

The Monthly Film Bulletin wrote: "The blessed relief of total insanity in the person of Spike Milligan's Arab Customs official ("Any fish derivatives? . . . sodium glutamates? . . . artificial ski slopes? . . . inflatable models of Raquel Welch? . . . hand-carved bidets ?") does not justify the previous ninety minutes of formless boredom."

Leslie Halliwell said: "Ineffective crazy comedy which never takes shape, preferring to aim barbs of satire in all directions."

Immediately after the film came out Sherrin said he was working on a possible followup script based on a script by Alan Bennett about an amorous vicar and curate in Yorkshire, called Rentascrubber.

Cleese was very unhappy with the film, and partly blamed Frost, who had sold the script to Ned Sherrin. The two men remained friends but their professional relationship was never as close again. Cleese declared "Ned had absolutely no talent at all for this type of comedy... I resented him very much, first of all for not using Charlie, and secondly for behaving very badly."

However Cleese was able to work with Charles Crichton on A Fish Called Wanda. Clark wrote "If their script had formed the basis of the Cleese/Crichton partnership, A Fish Called Wanda might never have been made. So, in a roundabout way, we did them a service."

Filmink wrote "Rank had once again, as it had with Peter Sellers after The Naked Truth, let slip an opportunity to work with the biggest comedy star (or stars, rather – Monty Python) of the decade."

== Bibliography ==
- Chapman, Graham (1980). A liar's autobiography, volume VII. Eyre Methuen.
- Clark, Jim (2010). Dream repairman: adventures in film editing. LandMarc Press.
