= Robert Eddison =

English actor (1908–1991)

Robert Eddison OBE
- Born: Robert Leadam Eddison; 10 June 1908; Yokohama, Empire of Japan
- Died: 14 December 1991 (aged 83); Westminster, London, England
- Occupation: Actor
- Years active: 1930–1991

Robert Leadam Eddison, OBE (10 June 1908 – 14 December 1991) was a British actor, who despite his lengthy career as a classical stage actor, is probably most widely remembered in the role of the Grail Knight in Indiana Jones and the Last Crusade. He also played Merlin in the BBC television series The Legend of King Arthur, and the tragic ferryman in The Storyteller episode "The Luck Child".

Eddison was an award winning actor, known for his mellifluously resonant, baritone voice and long, lean 6 ft 3 in (1.91 m) figure. Throughout his 60-year career he was constantly in demand as an actor and worked with many of Britain's greatest stage actors, often during the early formative years of their careers, including Ian McKellen, Derek Jacobi and Maggie Smith.

== Early life ==
Eddison was born in Yokohama, Japan, to Edwin Eddison and Hilda Muriel Leadham. He had a twin brother, Talbot Leadam Eddison, who later became a Rear Admiral in the Royal Navy and received the Distinguished Service Cross and The Most Honourable Order of the Bath. Another brother became a director of an engineering company, while the youngest brother was Roger Eddison.

From the age of five, Eddison knew that he wanted to be an actor. Both of his parents were members of the Yokohama Dramatic Club, where he often saw them both perform on stage. He recalls in his later memoir how "As they bent down to kiss me goodnight...the smell of the make-up and powder totally bewitched me. My father's make-up box had the same smell of spirit-gum and its effect on me was very potent".

His father was a civil engineer and died in 1917. Consequently, his mother decided to return to England with her four sons by way of British Columbia, Canada. It was here that Eddison along with his twin brother went to boarding school in Victoria for the next few years. After the Armistice in 1919, the family arrived back in England. Although his mother's family originally came from Leeds, she settled in Haywards Heath, Sussex.

== Education ==
Eddison, aged 14, along with his three other brothers, were all educated at Charterhouse School. He was extremely disappointed to discover that there was no dramatic society, especially considering that its past alumni included such theatre luminaries as Johnston Forbes-Robertson, Cyril Maude, Richard Goolden and Max Beerbohm.

It was anticipated that he would follow in the footsteps of his maternal grandfather and paternal uncle and become a doctor, consequently yet uncertain, Eddison later studied at Trinity College, Cambridge where he read medicine. During his time there he developed his passion for acting and the theatre. He was a member of the ADC and of The Marlowe Society and from 1929 to 1930 served as President of the Cambridge Amateur Dramatics Club. As President, he later recalled how he shamefully blackballed Alastair Cooke due to "A very suspect Lancashire accent". During his time there he played Virginia alongside George Rylands in Coriolanus and as Beatrice opposite Michael Redgrave as Florindo in Goldoni's A Servant of Two Masters.

It was whilst at Cambridge that Eddison made his professional debut at the Festival Theatre, Cambridge in Lady Audley's Secret on 23 June 1930 opposite Flora Robson as Lady Audley. Eddison later said he viewed this as his first professional credit, however "In fact, I drew no salary, but a silver cigarette-case at the end of the ten weeks."

As a result of his passions evidently remaining elsewhere, Eddison later revealed that he "came down" without a degree, but "didn't think it mattered at all, but had my chosen profession failed me, I would probably not have felt in any way light-hearted."

== Early career ==
In his early career, he spent a year at the Westminster Theatre, making his London debut in The Anatomist again with Flora Robson and Henry Ainley and directed by Tyrone Guthrie. He later spent a long period in weekly rep in Croydon. In 1934 he caught the attention of Ben Greet and until 1939 appeared in several productions, over the course of three seasons, at the Open Air Theatre, Regent's Park. He was seen and noted by Noël Coward whilst performing in a comedy titled Yes and No and later invited by Val Gielgud to appear in radio productions at the BBC.

During his varied career he played six seasons with the Old Vic. One of his first was taking over the roles of Le Beau and William from Alec Guinness with Edith Evans as Rosalind.

In 1938, and with war imminent, he "joined up" but soon temporarily postponed, in order to appear in as many plays as possible until he was truly needed. Consequently, in 1939, he was able to appear as Pericles and Oberon in Regent's Park. He was also free to accept an engagement from H.M. Tennent to appear alongside and in Noël Coward's This Happy Breed and his semi-autobiographical stage play Present Laughter in the part of Roland Maule. Eddison later recalled how "Sometimes in an actor's life there crops up a part that seems to be his own. Not often with me, but Roland Maule in 'Present Laughter' was one of them (and I think Noël meant it to be)". However the imminent productions were halted mid-rehearsal by the Second World War and to his regret he was not able to "create" Roland, this honour was given to James Donald. He did later appear in a revival in 1947, but in his own words "Some of the gilt was off the gingerbread." One of his last productions prior to leaving was Shakespeare's Romeo and Juliet in 1940, where he played Romeo opposite Pamela Brown's Juliet.

The war really exasperated him, as he had been due to appear in two sure-fire Coward hits in the West End, with a Broadway transfer expected. In 1940 he was called up to the Royal Navy, but officially became an enlisted man on 5 May 1941 and was trained at a naval establishment in Fareham, later moving barracks to Portsmouth. It was during a medical X-ray it was discovered that Eddison's heart was on the wrong side of his chest, but it was the view that if it had caused no trouble before that was no reason it should do now. He was drafted to HMS King George V at Rosyth. He soon rose through the ranks, being appointed a temporary sub-lieutenant in the Royal Naval Volunteer Reserve on 5 June 1942, and was sent to HMS King Alfred, which was a training depot for officers. As a result, he was now able to wear the uniform of an officer (he enjoyed the fact that it was tailor-made by Gieves). In 1943 he was promoted to temporary lieutenant and appointed to the aircraft carrier HMS Illustrious. Upon arriving on board he was greeted by another officer, Michael Hordern, who later also became an acclaimed actor. During his time there the ship was attacked by Kamikaze aircraft on Easter Day 1945. Eddison eventually spent three years aboard Illustrious, feeling very much "the man the Admiralty forgot" as appointments were usually only for two years.

Ian McKellen later recalled one anecdote of Eddison's wartime experience when he was performing the Gertrude Lawrence part in an officers' performance of Coward's Red Peppers and Fumed Oak: "After the show, the Petty Officer breathed heavily, what Robert always considered the best notice he ever had: 'You know, Eddison, I never knew you were so f*****g lovely!'"

Eddison was finally demobilized in March 1946. Not long after, he spent two further seasons at the Bristol Old Vic where he played Iago and was noted for his Hamlet, opposite Jane Wenham as Ophelia which later transferred to the St James' Theatre in 1948. Eddison eventually got to play the parts he had hoped to create opposite Coward in the revival of Coward's double bill which had been interrupted by the war.

In 1950 he was invited to join the prestigious Old Vic Company and was part of the company who reopened London's Old Vic Theatre after it had been severely damaged during the war. The opening production was Twelfth Night with Peggy Ashcroft as Viola and Paul Rogers as Malvolio; the production later toured Italy.

Throughout his career, Eddison had a steady stream of work and performed in Shakespeare and other classics, later playing the comic roles of Feste and Sir Andrew Aguecheek in Twelfth Night, and King Lear on the New York stage. He was also a familiar figure in plays by Ibsen, Chekhov, and Sophocles, and played Canon Chasuble in Oscar Wilde's The Importance of Being Earnest again alongside Flora Robson as Miss Prism.

In April 1958 he became an active committee member of the Society for Theatre Research and often gave lectures, later becoming its Chairman and Vice-President.

In 1960, he played Polonius to Jeremy Brett's Hamlet at the Strand Theatre. He was later to play Captain Hook in Peter Pan, as Alastair Sim refused to play twice daily.

== Later career ==
In 1967 he was engaged to play The Player in Tom Stoppard's Rosencrantz and Guildenstern Are Dead in New York. The play opened in Washington, with Variety saying he was "superb", but after five performances he was replaced, an experience which left him feeling very wounded. "It seemed that the trouble was that I wasn't Graham Crowden" he would later remember.

In 1969, he developed a lifelong friendship with Ian McKellen whom he first met when they appeared in the since legendary double bill Prospect Theatre Company productions of Shakespeare's Richard II and Marlowe's Edward II, with McKellen playing both leading parts on alternate nights and Eddison playing Lightborn and the Duke of York respectively. Eddison won the 1970 Clarence Derwent Award for 'Best male in a supporting role' for his performance of Lightborn. He later recalled that "I was ashamed at how much I enjoyed playing Lightborn in Edward II (surely one of the best small parts in dramaturgy!)"

When being interviewed by McKellen's biographer he reminisced that "It was a wonderful time… At the Piccadilly Theatre there were always queues at the Box Office and the younger members of the cast got very excited and I thought, poor things, they have been deprived". Eddison loved being in the company and had "the greatest admiration and affection for Ian. The Duke of York was a dull part, really, but I loved playing it - and Richard Cottrell exercised his considerable persuasive powers [as director] on me to do this and Lightborn. I was quite happy to do that as I thought it was the only possible part for me - I couldn't really see myself as one of those Lancastrian barons."

In 1974, he was invited to join McKellen and Edward Petherbridge's democratically run Actor's Company. The aim of the Company, through majority decisions, meant that the collective company of actors would all choose the plays on a democratic basis and to alternate between leading and supporting parts. Eddison later stated "I was very touched when I was asked to join the company. I was so much older than all the others. But it was all the greatest fun, huge fun, though I did find the meetings endless and ghastly. I never knew what to say!"

During the season he played the title role in King Lear, a part he played to great acclaim. Upon being offered the part Eddison later remembered "I was very touched to be asked to play Lear. I had been to do a play at Colchester and on my return I found this note from the rest of the company offering me the part. I wept, amazingly, for I had always wanted to do the part."

During this period he performed in both the UK and America. McKellen later recalled how when performing Chekhov's 'The Wood Demon' at the Brooklyn Academy of Music they shared the stage-level dressing-room where Enrico Caruso reputedly died.

He was part of the company at the National Theatre during its final performance at the Old Vic. On 4 October 1976 he delivered the first speech in the Olivier Theatre at the Royal National Theatre as the Prologue in Christopher Marlowe's Tamburlaine the Great. Eddison was quite proud to be able to say that he was the only actor in the world and forever will be, who opened both the South Bank and (six years later) The Barbican.

In 1978, he also won the Society of West End Theatre Award (now Laurence Olivier Award) for 'Best Actor in a Supporting Role' for his performances in Twelfth Night of Andrew Aguecheek / Feste, a part he had last played in 1950.

In 1985, he was later asked by his friend McKellen to join the new McKellen/Petherbridge Company at the Royal National Theatre, which sadly he was unable to join, but was again "touched to be asked".

Eddison also made his mark in radio, in countless BBC dramas through the decades, with some of his last roles including Death in The Canterbury Tales and parts in an adaptation of Japanese Noh plays. His television work included a bravura performance as Uncle Silas in a 1968 production for the Thames Television series Mystery and Imagination. His film career was limited, but included a supporting role in Peter Ustinov's 1948 comedy Vice Versa, the electrical 'Nick' in The Boy Who Turned Yellow (1972) and the college president in American Friends (1991).

However, Eddison's most notable, albeit small, role was in Indiana Jones and the Last Crusade as the ancient Grail Knight. The part was briefly considered to be played by Laurence Olivier, but he was too ill. Eddison was 81 at the time of filming. His line "He chose poorly" is one of the film's most famously quoted lines. Julian Glover, who played villain Walter Donovan, recalled Eddison was excited and nervous for his return to film, often asking if he had performed correctly. Recalling working with Eddison later on Glover said:

"He was such a wonderful actor, Robert. Fantastic voice too, a wonderful rolling voice. He came in and I thought he lent a tremendous gravitas to that part, but at the same time, he was able to take that wonderful line "He chose poorly" in such a dry way, that it was really funny. When I saw it, it got an absolute belly laugh"

His final production with McKellen was in Martin Sherman's Bent as Uncle Freddie in 1990, the same part McKellen was later to play in the 1997 film.

Eddison was awarded the OBE in the 1988 Queen's Birthday Honours List for his services to drama.

== Death ==
A lifelong smoker, and despite annually giving up smoking for Lent, Eddison died of bronchial pneumonia at a London hospital in 1991, aged 83.

Throughout his lengthy career, Eddison amassed an extensive personal collection of theatrical material. The collection included ceramics, architectural plans and drawings, and watercolours, prints, rare books and wax figures. The majority of the collection was built up following World War II, with acquisitions from well-known London dealers and from country outlets visited while on tour. It was regarded as "One of the finest collections of Georgian theatrical material in private hands, with a high proportion of the material being rare or unique and of national importance". Upon his death, the collection was later acquired by the Theatre Museum from the Executors of his estate as an acceptance in lieu of Inheritance Tax. His collection is now curated by the Victoria and Albert Museum.

He was later discovered to have written the beginnings of a memoir titled Majestic Service: An Autobiographical Memoir. The 22 pages were later published by the Society for Theatre Research in 1992.

Eddison was the great-uncle of the television presenter Dallas Campbell. Campbell later said "I remember sitting in the cinema as a ten-year-old in 1981 watching Harrison Ford in the first Indiana Jones film and immediately getting interested in archaeology. I was in my late teens when Uncle Bob was in the third film, The Last Crusade, and I was so proud of him. I remember going to the cinema and telling people he was my uncle, but nobody believed me."

== Filmography ==
Year	Title	Role	Notes
1936	Things to Come	Airman	Uncredited
1938	Sixty Glorious Years	Lanternist Professor	First credited film role
1940	Convoy	HMS Apollo Pilot	Uncredited
1946	School for Secrets	Air Traffic Control Radio Announcer	Uncredited
1948	Vice Versa	Mr. Blinkhorn	
1954	The Angel Who Pawned Her Harp	The Voice	Voice only
1964	Selkirk of Red River	Lord Selkirk	Short film
1966	I Was Happy Here		
1972	The Boy Who Turned Yellow	Nick	
1989	Indiana Jones and the Last Crusade	Grail Knight	
1991	American Friends	Rushden - The President	Final film

== Television ==
1938	Doctor 'My Book'		TV movie
1939	The Pilgrim's Progress	Faithful	TV movie
1939	The Anatomist	Raby	TV movie
1946	The Importance of Being Ernest	John Worthing	TV movie
1946	Two Gentlemen of Soho	Lord Withers	TV movie
1951	For the Children	Hermes	Episode: The Fate of the City
1952	Sunday Night Theatre	Hubert Manning	Episode: Ann Veronica
1952	Temple Folly	George Fitznoshus	TV movie
1953	The Affair at Assino	Tibaldi	TV movie
1953	The Wednesday Play	John Crestford in Happiness My Goal/Gabriel in Mac and the Atom	2 episodes
1953	The Disagreeable Man	Nicholas Drew	TV movie
1954	Sunday Night Theatre	Pontius Pilate	Episode: Caesar's Friend
1955	Sweet Coz	Hector Partridge	TV movie
1956	Sunday Night Theatre	Prospero	Episode: "The Tempest"
1957	Ordeal by Fire	King Charles VII	TV movie
1958	Sunday Night Theatre	Duke of Hermanos	Episode: The Noble Spaniard
1958	ITV Play of the Week	Don Pedro de Miura	Episode: The Strong Are Lonely
1959	ITV Play of the Week	Mr. Arcularis	Episode: Mr. Arcularis
1959	The Eustace Diamonds	Lord Thawn	5 episodes
1960	ITV Play of the Week	King Priam	Episode: Tiger at the Gates
1960	They Made History	Joseph Lister	Episode: Joseph Lister
1963	Maupassant	Henri d'Apreval	Episode: Fathers and Sons
1964	Thursday Theatre	Alexander MacColgie Gibbs	Episode: The Cocktail Party
1964	Theatre 625	Skuratov in All the Conspirators: The Just/Duchemin in Parade's End: Some Do Not	2 Episodes
1965	Out of the Unknown	Tzhilyantsi	Episode: Andover and the Android
1966	The Wednesday Play	Arch-Vicar	Episode: Ape and Essence
1967	Armchair Theatre		Episode: Don't Forget the Basics
1967	Theatre 625	Teacher	Episode: The Memorandum
1967	The Mock Doctor	Geronte	2 episodes
1968	Mystery and Imagination	Karswell in Casting the Runes/Silas Ruthyn in Uncle Silas	2 episodes
1970	The Tragedy of King Richard II	Duke of York	TV movie
1970	Edward II	Lightborn/Archbishop of Canterbury	TV movie
1973	Play of the Month	Prince Andronikov	Episode: Rasputin
1974	Play of the Month	Duke	Episode: The Adventures of Don Quixote
1975	2nd House	Actor in Knots	Episode: Toback's Gambler
1976	Sky	Goodchild	6 episodes
1977	The Velvet Glove	Father Andrew	Episode: Auntie's Niece
1979	The Legend of King Arthur	Merlin	2 episodes
1979	BBC2 Playhouse	Dr. Still	Episode: An Affinity with Dr. Still
1979	The Second Part of King Henry the Fourth, including his death and the coronation of King Henry the Fifth	Justice Robert Shallow	TV movie
1981	Bognor	John	6 episodes
1986	The Theban Plays by Sophocles	Chorus	2 episodes
1987	Porterhouse Blue	Old Master	1 episode
1987	Scoop	The Country - Troutbeck	TV movie
1987	The Lady's Not For Burning	The Chaplain	TV movie
1988	The Storyteller	Ferryman	Episode: The Luck Child
1989	Campion	Robert Skinn	Episode: The Case of the Late Pig: Part 2
1990	A TV Dante	Charon	Episode: Cantos 3 and 4
