= Michael Rothwell (actor) =

British actor (1936–2009)

Painting of Michael Rothwell by Peter Samuelson, 1959

Michael Rothwell (13 March 1936 – 24 January 2009) was an actor. Amongst his theatre work, he was part of the National Theatre's 1963/64 company, playing Roderigo in Olivier's Othello in 1964.

== Films ==
- Rentadick (1972 )
- Fragment of Fear (1970)
- Start the Revolution Without Me (1970)
- The Mummy's Shroud (1967)

== TV ==
- The Innes Book of Records (1979)
- Jude the Obscure (1971) as Dawlish
- The First Churchills (1969)
- Strange Report (1969)
- Mystery and Imagination - Casting the Runes (1968)
- Sexton Blake (1968)
- Vanity Fair (1967)
- The Pilgrim's Progress (1967)
- The Avengers (1967) (episode: The £50,000 Breakfast)
- The Plane Makers (1967)
- Write a Play (1967)
- Softly, Softly (1966)
- Thirty-Minute Theatre (1966)
- The Sandwich Man (1966)
