= Basil Henson =

English actor (1918–1990)

- Born: 31 July 1918; London, England
- Died: 19 December 1990 (aged 72); Sevenoaks, Kent, England
- Education: Royal Military Academy Sandhurst
- Occupation: Actor
- Years active: 1946–1990
- Spouses: First wife (died 1941); Eleanor Drew (divorced); Patricia Raine
- Children: 3

Basil Henson (31 July 1918 – 19 December 1990) was an English actor. He appeared on film, television, and the stage, where he was particularly known for his work at the National Theatre.

== Early life ==
Henson was born in London in 1918. He was educated at Malvern College and the Royal Military Academy Sandhurst, and served in the British Indian Army during World War II, where he was a major with the Garhwal Rifles.

== Career ==
Henson began his acting career in 1946 after returning to Britain, in a production of The Dancing Years at the London Casino. This began a long list of appearances on stage and television. His stage performances included a number of parts in Shakespeare productions, including The Merchant of Venice opposite Dustin Hoffman in London's West End and on Broadway. He also played in the original West End production of Terence Rattigan's Separate Tables at the St. James' Theatre in 1954. He appeared frequently at the National Theatre, including a part in the world premiere of Amadeus by Peter Shaffer. He had the very rare honour, along with his actor contemporaries Denis Quilley and Michael Bryant, of having a dressing room there named after him. His last appearance at the National Theatre was in a performance of Piano the week before his death.

He also appeared in many British films during his career. Among them Dr. Crippen (1962), the Edgar Wallace Mysteries series of second features, Darling (1965), The Frozen Dead (1966), Arthur? Arthur! (1969), The Walking Stick (1970), Cromwell (1970), The Final Programme (1973), and Galileo (1975).

Henson's television appearances included Emergency Ward 10, The Power Game, Sexton Blake, Casting the Runes, The Champions, Follyfoot, War and Peace, Fall of Eagles, the Judge, in Crown Court, and as Sir Horatio Manners in When the Boat Comes In. He also appeared as Dr. Abbott in the Fawlty Towers episode "The Psychiatrist" 1979.

== Personal life ==
Henson was married three times; he was married to his first wife for eighteen months, until her death in 1941. He was then married to actress Eleanor Drew, with whom he had two sons before their marriage ended in divorce. His third marriage was to Patricia Raine, with whom he had a daughter.

Henson died at his home in Sevenoaks, Kent, on 19 December 1990, at the age of 72.

== Partial Filmography ==
Year	Title	Role	Notes
1962	Dr. Crippen	Mr. Arditti	
1963	The Double	Derreck Alwyn	Edgar Wallace Mysteries
1965	Change Partners	Cedric Gallen	Edgar Wallace Mysteries
1965	Darling	Alec Prosser-Jones	
1966	The Frozen Dead	Dr. Tirpitz	
1969	Arthur? Arthur!	Coverdale	
1970	The Walking Stick	Insp. Malcolm	
1970	Cromwell	Hacker	
1970	The Man Who Haunted Himself	Casino Manager	Uncredited
1971	Quest for Love	Doctor	Uncredited
1973	The Final Programme	Dr. Lucas	
1975	Galileo	Infuriated Monk	
