= Jane Barrett =

English actress (1922–1969)

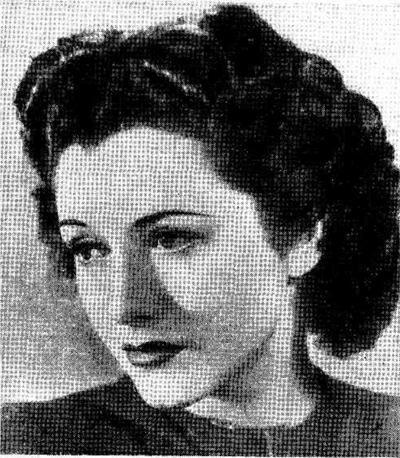
Jane Barrett in 1947

Jane Barrett was an English actress. Her birth name is Catherine Mary Cracknell.

Barrett was born in Highgate, May 7, 1922. She left school aged 14 and studied at the Royal Academy of Dramatic Art. She worked extensively in radio, theatre and television. It was estimated she appeared in over 2000 radio sessions on the BBC and by the end of the she had appeared on the air every day for four years.

Barrett made her film debut with a tiny role in The Citadel, but then focused on stage, television and radio until cast in a supporting role in The Captive Heart. This led to a six-year contract with the Rank Organisation.

Barrett married a Danish artist, Hans Helveg, in 1947 until her death and before with Derek Glynne (1939 - ?) (divorced).

While in Australia to make Eureka Stockade she signed a contract with the ABC to appear in several radio dramas. Filmink called Barrett's performance "dull, in part because of her unexciting screen presence, but mostly because of the script."

She died July 20, 1969 in Torbay, Devon, in England.

== Select credits ==
- The Captive Heart (1946)
- Colonel Bogey (1948)
- Eureka Stockade (1949)
- Time Gentlemen, Please! (1952)
- The Sword and the Rose (1953)
- Bond of Fear (1956)
- Change Partners (1965)

=== Australian radio credits ===
- The First Joanna
- Victoria Regina
- The Guinea Pig
