= Jennifer Gray (actress) =

British actress (1916–1962)

As Sheba in Dandy Dick, 1948

Jennifer Gray (5 November 1916 – 3 February 1962) was a British actress, frequently seen in the West End and on tour between 1934 and 1954. She made only two cinema films, but was often seen on BBC television in the late 1940s. Among the roles she created onstage were Daphne Stillington in Noël Coward's Present Laughter and Queenie Gibbons in his This Happy Breed, which premiered on successive nights in September 1942.

== Life and career ==
=== Early years ===
Gray was born in Hankow, China, on 5 November 1916, the daughter of Dr Alexander Hugh Skinner, and his wife Winifred Mary, née Beney. She was educated at Westonbirt School and then studied for the stage at the Central School of Speech and Drama under Elsie Fogerty. She made her first professional appearance on the stage at the Piccadilly Theatre, London on 16 December 1934, as Thetis in Dreams and Ditches.

After that she toured and played in repertory companies at Southend, Folkestone and Hull, before returning to the West End in 1935 in Closing at Sunrise. During the rest of the 1930s she appeared in Tovarich, Laughter in Court, In Theatre Street and This Money Business. In 1939–41 she toured as Bessie Watty in The Corn is Green, in Once a Crook and, in a company headed by Marie Tempest, Elsie Fraser in The First Mrs. Fraser. She was with the Harrogate Repertory Company in 1941–42.

In 1942 Gray created two Noël Coward roles in the space of two days. In a company headed by Coward, she played Daphne Stillington in Present Laughter on 20 September and Queenie Gibbons in This Happy Breed the following evening. After a 25-week tour, taking in 21 cities and towns in England, Scotland and Wales, the productions opened for a limited season of 38 performances at the Haymarket Theatre, London in April 1943. After that run finished, she joined the cast of Coward's Blithe Spirit at the Duchess Theatre, taking over the part of Edith.

At the Apollo Theatre in May 1944 she played Pauline Chester in How Are They at Home?; at the Q Theatre in December 1944 she appeared as Felicity in Not So Fast, My Pretty; at the Phoenix Theatre in February 1945 she played Maggie in Another Love Story and at the Q in May 1945 she appeared as Arline in Wait, My Love.

=== Post-war ===
From October 1945 Gray toured as Sheba in Pinero's farce, Dandy Dick with Sydney Howard as the Dean. In 1946 she appeared with the Old Vic company, which was then based at the Liverpool Playhouse, in James Bridie's comedy Mr Bolfrey. During 1946–47 Gray was with the repertory company at the Theatre Royal, Windsor, and she returned to the West End in October 1947 as Mrs Dallas-Baker in a revival of an early Somerset Maugham play, Smith.

In 1948 Gray again appeared as Sheba in Dandy Dick, in a production by Athene Seyler with décor by Cecil Beaton at the Lyric, Hammersmith in April 1948, with Denys Blakelock as the Dean. At the People's Palace in May, 1950 she appeared as Kerenhappuch in Bird-cage, in which she subsequently toured. In a production of A Streetcar Named Desire in 1951–52 she played Blanche du Bois. She toured in 1953 as Mrs James in The Gay Dog, a farce starring Wilfred Pickles. At the Globe Theatre in London she succeeded Gabrielle Brune as Hilda in Emlyn Williams's thriller Someone Waiting, in 1954, subsequently touring in the part with the author in the leading male role.

In addition to her stage roles, Gray appeared in two cinema films: Her Father's Daughter (1941) and an adaptation of The Gay Dog with Pickles and Petula Clark (1954). For the BBC she appeared as Sheba in adaptations of Seyler's production of Dandy Dick on radio in April 1948 and on television in July of that year. Other television appearances were in adaptations of Gas Light (1947), Trilby (1947), Tons of Money (1947) and George and Margaret (1948).

Gray was married to Robert Langford-Jones; she died in Johannesburg on 3 February 1962, aged 45.

== References and sources ==
=== Sources ===
- Mander, Raymond; Joe Mitchenson (2000) [1957]. Theatrical Companion to Coward. Barry Day and Sheridan Morley (2000 edition, ed.) (second ed.). London: Oberon Books. ISBN 978-1-84002-054-0.
- Parker, John; Freda Gaye; Ian Herbert (1978). Who Was Who in the Theatre. Detroit: Gale Research. OCLC 310466458.
