= Simon Coates (actor) =

British actor

Simon Coates is an Olivier-nominated British actor who has worked extensively with the National Theatre and the Royal Shakespeare Company, with whom he has appeared internationally, working with directors such as Sir Richard Eyre, Robert Lepage, Howard Davies, William Gaskill, Sir David Hare, Declan Donnellan, Tim Supple, Sir Tom Stoppard, David Farr, Lindsay Posner, Sean Holmes, Katie Mitchell, Indhu Rubasingham, Phyllida Lloyd, Thea Sharrock, Dame Vanessa Redgrave, Sir Trevor Nunn, Robert Icke, Simon Godwin, James Dacre, Rupert Goold, Sir Gregory Doran, Blanche McIntyre, Jonathan Munby and Sir Michael Boyd.

He has appeared in many productions including Robert Lepage's A Midsummer Night's Dream, Tim Supple's The Comedy of Errors, David Farr's Coriolanus, Parsons in 1984 (the version by Robert Icke and Duncan Macmillan for Headlong) and Declan Donnellan's As You Like It, for which he received an Olivier award nomination for Best Supporting Actor and a New York Drama Desk Award nomination for Outstanding Featured Actor.

Among the theatres he has performed at are the Royal National Theatre, Royal Shakespeare Company, Almeida, Shakespeare's Globe, Donmar Warehouse, Old Vic, Wyndhams, Duke of York's, Noël Coward, Harold Pinter, Playhouse, Young Vic, Liverpool Playhouse, Liverpool Everyman, Sheffield Crucible, Nottingham Playhouse, Bristol Old Vic, Hampstead Theatre, Manchester Royal Exchange, Chichester Festival, Kingston Rose, and the Dublin Gate Theatre.

On television he has appeared in Industry, Stephen, A Touch of Frost, EastEnders, The Bill, Dream Team, Doctors, The Amazing Mrs Pritchard and Holby City. Films include Tinker, Tailor, Soldier, Spy, Beginner's Luck, Richard III, All's Well That Ends Well, Sea Sorrow and Blueberry Inn.

Among the roles he has played are: Dr Frobisher in “The Browning Version”, Mr Fowler in “Table Number Seven”, Freddie in “Noises Off”, Lafew in “All’s Well That Ends Well “, Lord Stanley in “Richard III”, Dr Bradman in Blithe Spirit, Gayev in The Cherry Orchard, King Philip in King John, Dr. Yealland in Regeneration (an adaptation of Pat Barker's novel by Nicholas Wright)), Bishop of Ely in Richard III, Norman Tate in Donkeys' Years, Philinte in The Misanthrope, Sir Epicure Mammon in The Alchemist, Friar Lawrence in Romeo and Juliet, Cleante in Tartuffe, Sir Andrew Charleson in Plenty, Colonel Hennings in The Prince of Homburg, Captain Anson in Arthur and George (an adaptation of the Julian Barnes novel by David Edgar at the Birmingham Rep), Beralde in The Hypochondriac, Max in The Real Thing, Major Charles Ingram in Life After Scandal, John Middleton in The Constant Wife, Lockwood in Wuthering Heights, Captain Lancey in Translations, George Page in The Merry Wives of Windsor, Junius Brutus in Coriolanus, Hortensio in The Taming of the Shrew, Antipholus of Ephesus in The Comedy of Errors, Valere in The Miser, Celia in As You Like It, Valentine in Arcadia, Malcolm in Macbeth, Demetrius in A Midsummer Night's Dream, Freddie in Pygmalion and John Worthing in The Importance of Being Earnest.

His daughter, Bessie Coates, is also an actor.
