= Time Gentlemen, Please! =

1952 film by Lewis Gilbert

Time Gentlemen Please!
- Directed by: Lewis Gilbert
- Written by: Val Valentine; Peter Blackmore
- Based on: Nothing to Lose by R.J. Minney
- Produced by: Herbert Mason
- Starring: Eddie Byrne; Jane Barrett; Raymond Lovell; Sid James
- Cinematography: Wilkie Cooper
- Edited by: Manuel del Campo
- Music by: Antony Hopkins
- Production company: Group 3 Films
- Distributed by: Associated British-Pathé; Arthur Mayer-Edward Kingsley (US)
- Release dates: July 1952 (UK); 2 September 1953 (US)
- Running time: 79 minutes
- Country: United Kingdom
- Language: English

Time Gentlemen, Please! (also known as Nothing To Lose) is a 1952 British second feature ('B') comedy film directed by Lewis Gilbert and starring Eddie Byrne, Jane Barrett and Raymond Lovell. The screenplay was by Val Valentine and Peter Blackmore based on the 1946 novel Nothing to Lose by R.J. Minney. It was produced by Group 3 Films with funding from the National Film Finance Corporation and distributed by Associated British Picture Corporation.

Apart from occasional scene location within the bar (not critical to the plot) the title of the film (a phrase used at closing time in British bars) is not explained.

== Plot ==
The Ministry of Industrial Co-ordination is making a study of employment rates in British towns. The top will receive a visit from the Prime Minister. They are surprised that the best, allegedly at 99.9%, is Little Hayhoe, a small town in Essex with a population of 2,000 and only one unemployed.

The missing "0.1%" is Irishman Daniel "Dan" Dance, who is a homeless person but well-liked by most of the residents. The village council, however, are eager to put him out of the way before the Prime Minister arrives. When Dan leaves the pub without paying his bill, the landlord and councillor Eric Hace reports Dan to the village's only policeman, Police Constable Tumball, who arrests Dan. Sir Digby Montague, the head of the council and one of the local magistrates, plans to sentence him to a week in gaol.

When Sir Digby finds that his maid Sally, who is Dan's granddaughter, has been giving Dan Sir Digby's leftovers for dinner regularly, he promptly sacks her. The official reason that all get in trouble is theft of a fork.

Miss Mouncey, another councillor, comes up with the idea that Dan should be sent to live in one of the almshouses, which have been empty for 50 years. Vicar Reverend Simpson informs the Crouches, the custodians, that the regulations are to be strictly enforced, even though they are 400 years old. Among other things, the rules dictate that he be washed by the matron every night and wear a uniform in the manner of a Chelsea Pensioner. When Dan returns drunk the next night, he is put in stocks. Displeased by this, the villagers pelt Timothy Crouch with food, rather than pelt Dan as the councillor intended.

Bill Jordan, who is sympathetic to Dan's plight and attracted to Sally, reminds the councillors that an election will be held before the Prime Minister's visit.

When the vicar dies, he is replaced by the Reverend Soater, a much more lenient man and an Irishman himself. Soater examines the rules (written in Latin) to see if he can do anything to help his countryman. He discovers that the rents for the extensive lands indicated on a map are supposed to go to the upkeep of the almshouses, with any remainder distributed between the inmates daily. He estimates that the rents amount to almost £7,000 per annum. Dan, as the only inmate, is entitled to £20 a day. After consulting a lawyer the next day, Soater gives Dan £20, plus the arrears from when Soater arrived. The news spreads quickly and Dan treats everyone to drinks and gifts.

To get Dan to leave the almshouse, Sir Digby offers him a very easy job, though with a much smaller salary. When Dan refuses, Hace schemes to make Dan late for the daily 9.00pm closing of the almshouse gates, which would disqualify him, enlisting Miss Mouncey to help distract Dan, but Dan gets Miss Mouncey drunk and she blurts out the plot. Dan rushes back to the almshouse just in time.

Bill Jordan goes out on a date with Peggy Stebbins and, at her insistence, kisses her. Then he quickly drives over to Sally's lodgings and, without a word, kisses her, but when he admits Peggy put the idea into his head, Sally becomes annoyed and slams the door on him.

With the council elections coming up, Mr. Spink, who owns the local factory, suggests that Dan run for office. Dan is uninterested at first, but soon decides he will, and he is joined by Bill Jordan, Spink and Mary Wade, the shopkeeper who now employs Sally. Hace comes up with a scheme to make Dan look foolish by recruiting 11 tramps for the almshouse, but Soater cites a regulation that the additions must be approved by the residents, and Dan rejects them.

The new candidates are all elected, displacing the previous councillors. Sally is overjoyed and kisses Bill. Dan rushes back to the almshouse at 9.00, where he exacts revenge on the Crouches and then heads back to the festivities. He announces that now that he has disqualified himself, the money can go to more worthy causes and the almshouses will be converted to a day nursery for the workers' children. Spink offers Dan a job suitable to his talents: mattress tester. With that, Little Hayhoe reaches its goal of 100% employment and welcomes the visit of the Prime Minister.

== Cast ==
- Eddie Byrne as Dan Dance
- Jane Barrett as Sally
- Robert Brown as Bill Jordan
- Raymond Lovell as Sir Digby Montague
- Sidney James as the pub landlord, Eric Hace
- Marjorie Rhodes as Miss Mouncey
- Hermione Baddeley as Emma Stebbins
- Dora Bryan as Peggy Stebbins
- Thora Hird as Alice Crouch
- Ivor Barnard as Timothy Crouch
- Edie Martin as Mary Wade
- Sydney Tafler as Joseph Spink
- Joan Young as Mrs. Round
- Marianne Stone as Mrs. Pincer
- Patrick McAlinney as Rev. Soater
- Julian D'Albie as George Burton
- Nigel Clarke as Rev. Simpson
- Henry Longhurst as P.C. Tumball
- Peter Jones as Lionel Batts
- Peter Swanwick as Jeremiah Higgins
- Thomas Gallagher as Bob Cannon
- Freda Bamford as Mabel
- Ian Carmichael as Public Relations Officer for the Prime Minister
- Brian Roper as Cyril
- Harry Herbert as tramp
- Jack May as man with ear-trumpet
- Toke Townley as potman
- Tristan Rawson as Dr. Hawkes
- Donovan Winter as hairdresser
- Sheila Aza as manicurist
- Julie Milton as Manor house maid
- Michael Edmonds as Freckles
- Cora Bennett as P.R.O.'s secretary
- Audrey Noble as Spink's secretary
- Virginia Winter as vicarage maid
- Neil Gemmell as heckler
- Helen Boursnell as P.C. Tumball's little girl

== Production ==
It was the third film from Group 3 Films and was shot under the title Nothing to Lose. John Grierson head of Group 3 said it was "gentle nose thumbing" and hoped it could be as good as The Well Digger's Daughter or The Baker's Wife. The film's sets were designed by the art director Michael Stringer. It was shot at Southall Studios and on location at Thaxted in Essex.

Filming started September 1951. Part of the finance came from two rubber merchants, Colonels Weil and Prior.

== Home media ==
In 2007, Time Gentlemen, Please! was given a DVD release as part of the Long Lost Comedy Classics collection (Slam Dunk Media).

== Critical reception ==
The Monthly Film Bulletin wrote: "This is quite a nice little picture. The village scene – the film was largely shot in Thaxted – is prettily caught and the characterisations manage to escape the patronage which they so often receive in British films of this kind. While showing no particular flair for comedy, Lewis Gilbert's direction is competent; but the dialogue is often extremely laborious, intent on ramming home each gag. Eddie Byrne, clearly too youthful for the part of Dan, gives an agreeable enough performance, though lacking the personal magnetism which could carry a film of this type."

Variety wrote: "'Third production of Group 3, film-making unit established in Great Britain with government in to bolster picture production, Time Gentlemen Please! is patterned along the lines of its predecessors, Brandy for the Parson and The Brave Don't Cry. This pic takes an irreverent approach to things respectable in England. With the John Grierson (he turned out successful documentaries for Canada prior to going to Britain) touch as production chief, this turns out a sly British comedy which should go nicely in U. S. art theatres."

The film historians Steve Chibnall and Brian McFarlane regard Time Gentlemen, Please! as one of "the most attractive British 'B' films, noting that "it has the advantage of an amusing screenplay ... a central character engaging enough in concept and execution to hold the narrative together, and one of those prodigally rich casts of British character actors ... which can make much worse films than this enjoyable".
