= Beryl Measor =

British actress (1908–1965)

As Madame Arcati in Blithe Spirit, 1944

Beryl Measor (22 April 1908 – 8 February 1965) was a British actress. She created roles in plays by Noël Coward and Terence Rattigan. In addition to her stage career she broadcast frequently on BBC radio and television, and appeared in several cinema films.

== Life and career ==
Measor was born in Shanghai, China, on 22 April 1908, the daughter of Ernest Anthony Measor and his wife, Mary (née Humphreys). She was educated at St Margaret's School, Bushey, before enrolling at the Royal Academy of Dramatic Art in London. She was a star pupil, winning the RADA Silver Medal in 1931.

She made her first professional appearance on the stage at the Whitehall Theatre on 28 July 1931, walking-on in Take a Chance. In 1931–32, she toured as Luella Carmody in Late Night Final. From 1932 to 1934 she was a member of repertory companies in Worthing, Croydon, and Hull. From 1934 she appeared in West End productions, mostly of new plays, and at the Old Vic as Margaret in Much Ado About Nothing (1934). In 1942 she created two roles in Noël Coward plays: Monica Reed in Present Laughter and Edie in This Happy Breed, first during a long wartime provincial tour and then in the West End. She took over from Margaret Rutherford as Madame Arcati in the original production of Coward's Blithe Spirit during its record-breaking London run, and played the part on tour, with the author as Charles Condomine. In 1945 she married the actor Terence De Marney.

From 1941 to 1961 Measor was a frequent broadcaster on BBC radio and television. In addition to playing Madame Arcati in the first televised version of Blithe Spirit (performed live, 1948), her roles included Lady Fallowfield in Eric Maschwitz's 13-part series Family Affairs (1950) and Mrs Proudie in a six-part adaptation of Barchester Towers (1959). On radio she was a regular member of the cast of Navy Mixture (1946–47), with Jimmy Jewel and Ben Warriss.

Between 1946 and 1954, Measor played in the West End in eight new plays, mostly box-office successes, though not subsequently revived. Her next role in a notable play was in Terence Rattigan's double-bill Separate Tables as Miss Cooper, the proprietor of the hotel in which both plays are set. She received the Clarence Derwent Award for her performance in this production in London and made her first appearance on Broadway in the same role in October 1956, receiving a Tony nomination.

Her final West End roles were Cornelia Scott in Something Unspoken and Mrs Holly in Suddenly Last Summer in the Tennessee Williams double bill Garden District at the Arts Theatre in 1958. In 1959 she played Lady Saill in Eric Linklater's Breakspear in Gascony at the Edinburgh Festival.

Measor died in London on 8 February 1965 at the age of 56; her husband survived her. They had no children.

== Film and television roles ==
- Almost a Honeymoon – Mabel, the barmaid (1938)
- Richard of Bordeaux – Countess of Derby (1938)
- English Without Tears – Miss Faljambe (1944)
- Dual Alibi – Gwen (1947)
- Odd Man Out – Maudie (1947)
- The Mark of Cain – Nurse Brand (1947)
- While the Sun Shines – Woman in train (1947)
- Blithe Spirit – Madame Arcati (1948)
- Esther Waters – Mrs Spires (1948)
- Morning Star – Amarilla Arbuthnot (1956)
- Please Murder Me – cast member (1958)
- Uncle Harry – Hester Quincey (1958)
- Barchester Towers – Mrs Proudie (1959)
- No Wreath for the General Episode 3 – middle-aged woman (1960)

== Sources ==
- Parker, John; Freda Gaye; Ian Herbert (1978). Who Was Who in the Theatre. Detroit: Gale Research. OCLC 310466458.
- Payn, Graham (1994). My Life with Noël Coward. New York: Applause Books. ISBN 978-1-55783-190-3.
