= Blithe Spirit (play) =

Play written by Noël Coward

Margaret Rutherford (Madame Arcati), Kay Hammond (Elvira) and Fay Compton (Ruth), 1941

Blithe Spirit is a comic play by Noël Coward, described by the author as "an improbable farce in three acts". The play concerns the socialite and novelist Charles Condomine, who invites the eccentric medium and clairvoyant Madame Arcati to his house to conduct a séance, hoping to gather material for his next book. The scheme backfires when he is haunted by the ghost of his wilful and temperamental first wife, Elvira, after the séance. Elvira makes continual attempts to disrupt Charles's marriage to his second wife, Ruth, who cannot see or hear the ghost.

The play was first seen in the West End in 1941 and ran for 1,997 performances, a new record for a non-musical play in London. It also did well on Broadway later that year, running for 657 performances. The play was adapted for the cinema in 1945; a second film version followed in 2020. Coward directed a musical adaptation, High Spirits, seen on Broadway and in the West End in 1964. Radio and television presentations of the play have been broadcast in Britain and the US from 1944 onwards. It continues to be revived in the West End, on Broadway and elsewhere.

== Background ==
The title of the play is taken from Shelley's poem "To a Skylark", ("Hail to thee, blithe Spirit! / Bird thou never wert"). For some time before 1941 Coward had been thinking of a comedy about ghosts. His first thoughts centred on an old house in Paris, haunted by spectres from different centuries, with the comedy arising from their conflicting attitudes, but he could not get the plot to work in his mind. He knew that in wartime Britain, with death a constant presence, there would be some objection to a comedy about ghosts, but his firm view was that as the story would be thoroughly heartless, "you can't sympathise with any of them. If there was a heart it would be a sad story."

After his London office and flat had been destroyed in the Blitz, Coward took a short holiday with the actress Joyce Carey at Portmeirion on the coast of Snowdonia in Wales. She was writing a play about Keats, and he was still thinking about his ghostly light comedy. He later recounted:

We sat on the beach with our backs against the sea wall and discussed my idea exclusively for several hours. Keats, I regret to say, was not referred to. By lunchtime the title had emerged together with the names of the characters, and a rough, very rough, outline of the plot. At seven-thirty the next morning I sat, with the usual nervous palpitations, at my typewriter. ... I fixed the paper into the machine and started. Blithe Spirit. A Light Comedy in Three Acts. For six days I worked from eight to one each morning and from two to seven each afternoon. On Friday evening, May ninth, the play was finished and, disdaining archness and false modesty, I will admit that I knew it was witty, I knew it was well constructed, and I also knew that it would be a success.

== Synopsis ==
Charles Condomine is a successful novelist. At the start of the play, while dressing for dinner, he and his second wife, Ruth, discuss his first wife, Elvira, who died young, seven years earlier. He comments, "I remember her physical attractiveness, which was tremendous, and her spiritual integrity, which was nil". Among the Condomines' dinner guests is an eccentric medium, Madame Arcati, whom Charles has invited in the hope of learning about the occult for a story he is writing. He has arranged for her to conduct a séance after dinner. During the séance she plays a recording of Irving Berlin's song "Always" on the gramophone, inadvertently attracting the ghost of Elvira.

The medium leaves, unaware of what she has done. Only Charles can see or hear Elvira, and Ruth does not believe that Elvira exists, until a floating vase is handed to her out of thin air. The ghostly Elvira makes continued, and increasingly desperate, efforts to disrupt Charles's current marriage. Charles accuses her of being "feckless and irresponsible and morally unstable". She finally sabotages his car in the hope of killing him so that he will join her in the spirit world, but it is Ruth rather than Charles who drives off and is killed.

Ruth's ghost immediately comes back for revenge on Elvira, and though Charles cannot at first see Ruth, he can see that Elvira is being chased and tormented, and his house is in uproar. He calls Madame Arcati back to exorcise both the spirits, but instead of banishing them she unintentionally materialises Ruth. With both his dead wives now fully visible, and neither of them in the best of tempers, Charles, together with Madame Arcati, goes through séance after séance and spell after spell to try to exorcise them. It is not until Madame Arcati works out that the housemaid, Edith, is psychic and had unwittingly been the conduit through which Elvira was summoned that she succeeds in dematerialising both ghosts. Charles is left seemingly in peace, but Madame Arcati, hinting that the ghosts may still be around unseen, warns him that he should go far away as soon as possible. Coward repeats one of his signature theatrical devices at the end of the play, where the central character tiptoes out as the curtain falls – a device that he also used in Present Laughter, Private Lives and Hay Fever. Charles bids his vanished wives farewell and leaves at once; the unseen ghosts throw things and wreck the room as soon as he has gone.

== First production ==
Blithe Spirit was first produced at the Manchester Opera House on 16 June 1941, and then premiered in the West End on 2 July. During the long London run − 1,997 performances − it played at three theatres. It opened at the Piccadilly Theatre, transferred to the St James's Theatre on 23 March 1942 and then to the Duchess Theatre on 6 October 1942, closing on 9 March 1946. It was directed by Coward; sets and costumes were designed by Gladys Calthrop. The run set a record for non-musical plays in the West End that was not surpassed until September 1957 by The Mousetrap.

=== Original cast ===
- Charles Condomine – Cecil Parker (Note: Parker was replaced by Nicholas Phipps from June 1944; Alan Webb from November 1945. Holiday cover by Noël Coward, August 1942; Ronald Squire, January 1943; Dennis Price, August 1943; Nicholas Phipps, November 1943.)
- Ruth – Fay Compton (Note: Compton was replaced by Irene Browne from October 1942; Joyce Carey from June 1944. Holiday cover by Joyce Carey, November 1943.)
- Elvira – Kay Hammond (Note: Hammond was replaced by Judy Campbell from July 1943; Penelope Dudley Ward from June 1944. Holiday cover by Betty Ann Davies, December 1943.)
- Madame Arcati – Margaret Rutherford (Note: Rutherford was replaced by Agnes Lauchlan from December 1942; Beryl Measor from August 1943; Irene Browne from April 1945; Joyce Barbour from September 1945. Holiday cover by Ella Milne, November 1943.)
- Dr Bradman – Martin Lewis
- Mrs Bradman – Moya Nugent
- Edith, a maid – Ruth Reeves (Note: Replaced by Julia Lang.)

Source: Mander and Mitchenson.

There were several changes of cast during the run; all but two of the roles were played by different performers at one time or another. Only Martin Lewis and Moya Nugent stayed from the first night to the last. Irene Browne played two different characters during the run. After playing the steely Ruth from 1942 to 1944 she appeared for six months in 1945 as the ebullient Madame Arcati. As well as changes in the regular principals, other actors − including Coward − appeared for short spells of two or more weeks to allow the regulars to take a holiday.

While the play continued its London run several tours were organised. A company under the management of Ronald Squire began a British tour in February 1942. The cast included Squire (Charles), Browne (Ruth), Ursula Jeans (Elvira), and Agnes Lauchlan (Madame Arcati). A company headed by Coward presented the piece along with Present Laughter and This Happy Breed under the collective title of Play Parade, in a 25-week tour from September 1942. Coward played Charles; Joyce Carey, Ruth; Judy Campbell, Elvira; and Beryl Measor, Madame Arcati. Another tour went out in 1943, headed by John Wentworth as Charles and Mona Washbourne as Madame Arcati.

From February 1944 an ENSA company toured the Middle East and continental Europe with Blithe Spirit. Emlyn Williams played Charles; Jessie Evans and Elliott Mason shared the role of Madame Arcati, Adrianne Allen played Ruth; and Lueen MacGrath, Elvira. From October 1945 to February 1946 another ENSA company played Blithe Spirit (and Hamlet) in India and Burma for the armed forces. John Gielgud played Charles; Irene Browne, Madame Arcati; Marian Spencer, Ruth; and Hazel Terry, Elvira.

== Later productions ==
=== Britain ===
In July 1970 the play was revived in the West End at the Globe Theatre, starring Patrick Cargill as Charles, Phyllis Calvert as Ruth, Amanda Reiss as Elvira and Beryl Reid as Madame Arcati; it ran until January 1971. It was revived by the National Theatre in 1976 in a production directed by Harold Pinter, starring Richard Johnson as Charles, Rowena Cooper as Ruth, Maria Aitken as Elvira and Elizabeth Spriggs as Madame Arcati. Another London revival played in 1986 at the Vaudeville Theatre, starring Simon Cadell as Charles, Jane Asher as Ruth, Joanna Lumley as Elvira and Marcia Warren as Madame Arcati. A 1997 revival at the Chichester Festival Theatre, directed by Tim Luscombe, featured Steven Pacey (Charles), Belinda Lang (Ruth), Twiggy (Elvira) and Dora Bryan as Madame Arcati.

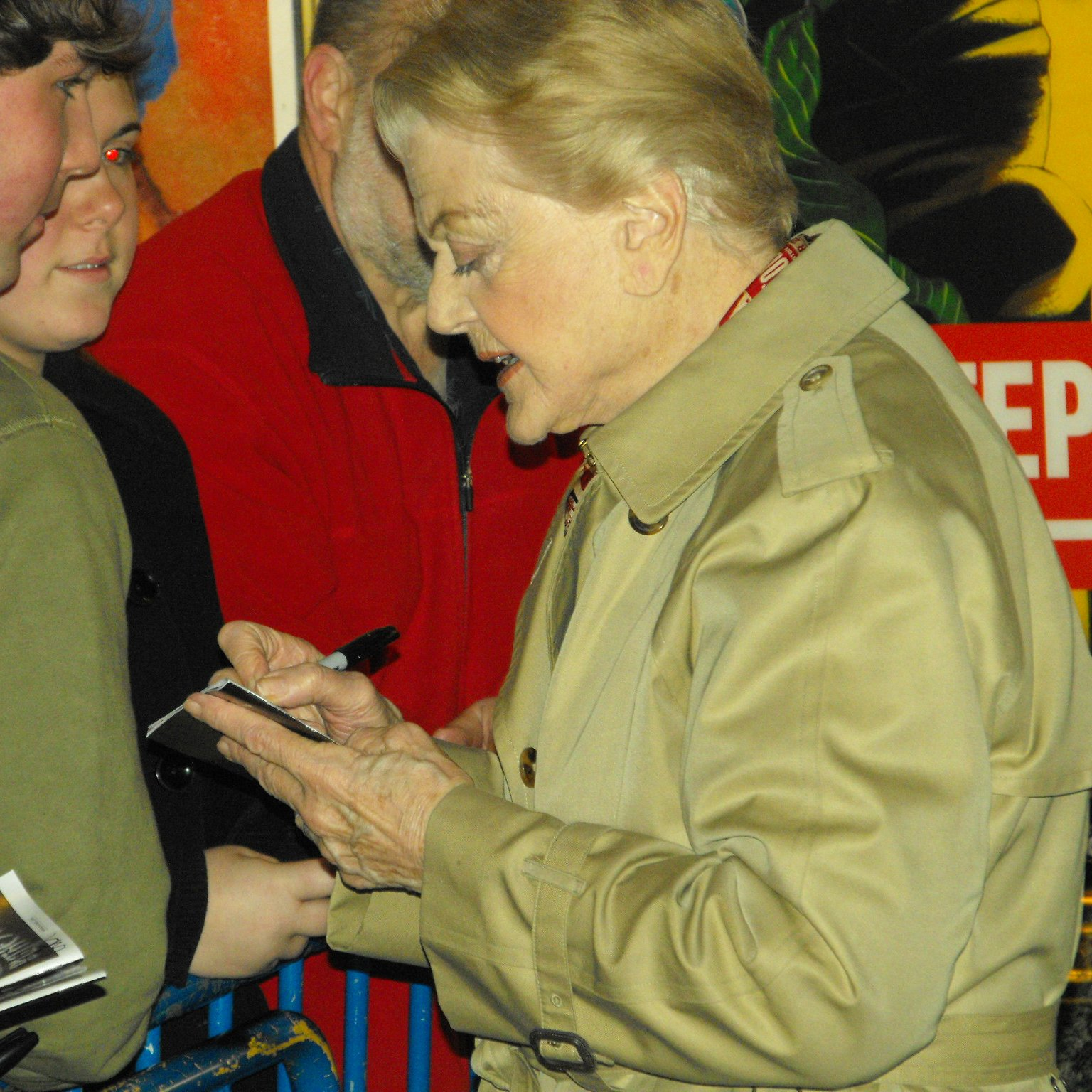
Angela Lansbury following a performance of the play in 2009

The piece was back in the West End at the Savoy Theatre in 2004, in a production directed by Thea Sharrock, starring Aden Gillett as Charles, Joanna Riding as Ruth, Amanda Drew as Elvira and Penelope Keith (succeeded by Stephanie Cole) as Madame Arcati. Matt Wolf wrote in Variety, "Sharrock and her company land every laugh in a play that induces an indecent amount of pleasure while never letting us forget the extent to which Blithe Spirit comes marinated in pain."

Sharrock directed a revival of her production of the play, which started as a UK tour and then moved to the Apollo Theatre, London. It ran there from March to June 2011, with a cast including Robert Bathurst as Charles, Hermione Norris as Ruth, Ruthie Henshall as Elvira and Alison Steadman as Madame Arcati.

A West End production, directed by Michael Blakemore, opened at the Gielgud Theatre in March 2014, with Charles Edwards as Charles, Janie Dee as Ruth, Jemima Rooper as Elvira, Angela Lansbury as Madame Arcati and Simon Jones as Dr Bradman, as in the 2009 Broadway production. It ran until June.

A revival at the Theatre Royal Bath in 2019 was followed by a UK tour and a West End run at the Duke of York's Theatre that opened in March 2020. After 12 performances, it was interrupted due to the COVID-19 pandemic. The production starred Jennifer Saunders as Madame Arcati and Richard Eyre directed. Geoffrey Streatfeild and Lisa Dillon played Charles and Ruth Condomine, Simon Coates and Lucy Robinson were Dr and Mrs Bradman, Emma Naomi played Elvira and Rose Wardlaw was Edith. Design was by Anthony Ward, lighting by Howard Harrison, sound by John Leonard and illusions by Paul Kieve.

The Eyre production returned to the West End for a limited run from September to November 2021 at the Harold Pinter Theatre with the same cast and crew, except that Madeleine Mantock played Elvira.

==== London casts, 1970 to 2019 ====
Roles	1970	1976	1986	2004	2011	2014	2019
	Globe	National Theatre	Vaudeville	Savoy	Apollo	Gielgud	Harold Pinter
Charles	Patrick Cargill	Richard Johnson	Simon Cadell	Aden Gillett	Robert Bathurst	Charles Edwards	Geoffrey Streatfeild
Ruth	Phyllis Calvert	Rowena Cooper	Jane Asher	Joanna Riding	Hermione Norris	Janie Dee	Lisa Dillon
Elvira	Amanda Reiss	Maria Aitken	Joanna Lumley	Amanda Drew	Ruthie Henshall	Jemima Rooper	Emma Naomi
Madame Arcati	Beryl Reid	Elizabeth Spriggs	Marcia Warren	Penelope Keith	Alison Steadman	Angela Lansbury	Jennifer Saunders
Dr Bradman	John Hart Dyke	Geoffrey Chater	Roger Hume	Derek Hutchinson	Bo Poraj	Simon Jones	Simon Coates
Mrs Bradman	Daphne Newton	Joan Hickson	Eira Griffiths	Barbara Kirby	Charlotte Thornton	Sandra Shipley	Lucy Robinson
Edith	Sylvia Brayshay	Susan Williamson	Lynette McMarrough	Michelle Terry	Jodie Taibi	Susan Louise O'Connor	Rose Wardlaw

=== America ===
The Broadway premiere was on 5 November 1941 at the Morosco Theatre, presented by Coward's American producer, John C. Wilson, with designs by Stewart Chaney. The play transferred to the Booth Theatre on 18 May 1942; it ran for a total of 657 performances. The play won the New York Drama Critics' Circle Award for Best Foreign Play for the 1941–1942 season. After closing at the Booth on 5 June 1943, a return engagement played 32 performances from 6 September to 2 October 1943 at the Morosco. Haila Stoddard took over as Elvira. While the first Broadway production was still running, Wilson mounted another in Chicago. It opened on 17 February 1942 at the Selwyn Theater.

Blithe Spirit was revived on Broadway at the Neil Simon Theatre on 31 March 1987 in a production directed by Brian Murray. It starred Richard Chamberlain as Charles, Judith Ivey as Ruth, Blythe Danner as Elvira and Geraldine Page as Madame Arcati. It ran for 104 performances. Page, who received a Tony Award nomination for Best Actress, died of a heart attack during the run; Patricia Conolly succeeded her in the role.

A Broadway revival played in 2009 at the Shubert Theatre. Blakemore directed, with Rupert Everett as Charles, Jayne Atkinson as Ruth and Christine Ebersole as Elvira; Lansbury and Jones played Madame Arcati and Dr Bradman, as they would on the US tour and in the 2014 West End production. The New York Times found the revival somewhat uneven, calling the opening performance "bumpy", but praised Lansbury's performance. (Note: The production won several awards. Lansbury won a Tony Award for Best Featured Actress. The play won the Drama League Award for Distinguished Revival of a Play)

A revival, directed by Blakemore with most of the West End cast (including Lansbury at age 89) except Charlotte Parry as Ruth, toured North America from December 2014 to March 2015, visiting Los Angeles, San Francisco, Toronto and Washington D.C.

==== American casts, 1941 to 2011 ====
Roles	1941	1942	1987	2009	2011
	Morosco	Selwyn	Neil Simon	Shubert	On tour
Charles	Clifton Webb	Dennis King	Richard Chamberlain	Rupert Everett	Charles Edwards
Ruth	Peggy Wood	Carol Goodner	Judith Ivey	Jayne Atkinson	Charlotte Perry
Elvira	Leonora Corbett	Annabella	Blythe Danner	Christine Ebersole	Jemima Rooper
Madame Arcati	Mildred Natwick	Estelle Winwood	Geraldine Page	Angela Lansbury	Angela Lansbury
Dr Bradman	Philip Tonge	Lowell Gilmore	William LeMassena	Simon Jones	Simon Jones
Mrs Bradman	Phyllis Joyce	Valerie Cossart	Patricia Conolly	Deborah Rush	Sandra Shipley
Edith	Doreen Lang	Belle Gardner	Nicola Cavendish	Susan Louise O'Connor	Susan Louise O'Connor

=== Australia ===
A production at the Comedy Theatre, Melbourne in April 1945 starred Edwin Styles as Charles, Aileen Britton as Ruth, Bettina Welch as Elvira and Letty Craydon as Madame Arcati. In 2003 Roger Hodgman directed a production by the Melbourne Theatre Company, with Miriam Margolyes as Arcati. It later played the Sydney Opera House.

=== France ===
A French translation, Jeux d'esprits, was presented at the Théâtre de la Madeleine, Paris, in November 1946, directed by Pierre Dux, with Robert Murzeau as Charles, Renée Devillers as Suzanne (Ruth), Simone Renant as Elvire (Elvira) and Jeanne Fusier-Gir as Madame Arcati. In Le Figaro Jean-Jacques Gautier acknowledged Coward as a master of comic absurdity but found the piece "thin, thin, thin" – the champagne a little lacking in sparkle.

== Critical reception ==
After the first performance in Manchester the reviewer in The Manchester Guardian thought the mixture of farce and impending tragedy "An odd mixture and not untouched by genius of a sort". After the London premiere, Ivor Brown commented in The Observer on the skill with which Coward had treated his potentially difficult subject; he ended his notice, "But here is a new play, a gay play, and one irresistibly propelled into our welcoming hearts by Miss Rutherford's Lady of the Trances, as rapt a servant of the séance as ever had spirits on tap." The London correspondent of The Guardian wrote, "London received Mr Noel Coward's ghoulish farce with loud, though not quite unanimous acclaim. There was a solitary boo – from an annoyed spiritualist, presumably." The Times considered the piece the equal not only of Coward's earlier success Hay Fever but of Wilde's classic comedy The Importance of Being Earnest. There were dissenting views. James Agate thought the play "common", and Graham Greene called it "a weary exhibition of bad taste".

When the piece had its first West End revival in 1970 the play was warmly though not rapturously praised by the critics, but by the time of the next major production, in 1976, Irving Wardle of The Times considered, "Stylistically, it is Coward's masterpiece: his most complete success in imposing his own view of things on the brute facts of existence," and Michael Billington of The Guardian wrote of Coward's influence on Harold Pinter. Coward's partner, Graham Payn, commented to Peter Hall that Coward would have loved the production (directed by Pinter) "because at last the play was centred on the marriage between Charles and Ruth; Elvira and ... Madame Arcati were incidentals". (Note: At the first rehearsal Pinter had told his cast, "Noël Coward calls this play an improbable farce. Well, I just wish to make one thing clear – I do not regard it as improbable and I do not regard it as a farce".) After the Broadway revival in 1987 Newsweek commented that the play reminds us that Coward was the precursor of playwrights like Pinter and Joe Orton.

In 2004 Charles Spencer of The Daily Telegraph wrote, "With Hay Fever and Private Lives, Blithe Spirit strikes me as being one of Coward's three indisputable comic masterpieces. [It is] the outrageous frivolity with which Coward treats mortality that makes the piece so bracing."

== Adaptations ==
=== Film ===
Blithe Spirit has twice been adapted for the cinema. A 1945 film was directed by David Lean, and starred two of the principals from the original stage production reprising their roles: Kay Hammond as Elvira and Margaret Rutherford as Madame Arcati. Constance Cummings played Ruth, and Rex Harrison Charles. Coward was out of the country during the filming and was therefore obliged to leave the direction to Lean. The author was less than impressed with the result. He found Lean's direction static and said that the film "wasn't entirely bad but it was a great deal less good than it should have been".

A 2020 film adaptation was directed by Edward Hall, with Dan Stevens as Charles, Isla Fisher as Ruth, Leslie Mann as Elvira and Judi Dench as Madame Arcati. In The Guardian Peter Bradshaw gave the film one star out of a possible five: "a festival of mugging and farcical overacting". The New York Times also published an unenthusiastic review: "more screw-loose than screwball ... a ludicrous adaptation of Noël Coward's 1941 stage play, reimagines its source material as little more than a slip-and-fall farce".

=== Radio ===
American radio adaptations were transmitted in 1944 (NBC, with Ronald Colman, Loretta Young and Edna Best), 1947 (ABC, with Clifton Webb, Leonora Corbett and Mildred Natwick), and 1952 (NBC, with John Loder and Mildred Natwick).

BBC Radio's first adaptation was broadcast in 1954, with Michael Denison (Charles), Thelma Scott (Ruth), Dulcie Gray (Elvira) and Winifred Oughton (Madame Arcati). A second version with Denison and Gray was broadcast in 1972, with Gudrun Ure as Ruth and Sylvia Coleridge as Madame Arcati. A 1983 version featured Paul Eddington as Charles, Julia McKenzie as Ruth, Anna Massey as Elvira and Peggy Mount as Madame Arcati. The short-lived British commercial radio station Oneword presented a 2002 adaptation co-produced with and subsequently released on CD by Naxos Audio Books. The director was Sheridan Morley and the cast was led by Corin Redgrave (Charles), Kika Markham (Ruth), Joanna Lumley (Elvira) and Thelma Ruby (Madame Arcati). A 2008 BBC Radio adaptation featured Roger Allam as Charles, Hermione Gulliford as Ruth, Zoe Waites as Elvira and Maggie Steed as Madame Arcati. In December 2014 an adaptation of the play featured cast members of The Archers in a supposed amateur production.

=== Television ===
An American television adaptation was broadcast in 1946, with Philip Tonge as Charles, Carol Goodner as Ruth, Leonora Corbett as Elvira, Estelle Winwood as Madame Arcati and Doreen Lang reprising the role of Edith. In Britain, BBC television broadcast a production in 1948, directed by George More O'Ferrall, with Frank Lawton as Charles, Marian Spencer as Ruth, Betty Ann Davies as Elvira and Beryl Measor reprising her stage role of Madame Arcati. On 14 January 1956 Coward directed a live American television adaptation for the Ford Star Jubilee series, in which he also starred as Charles, with Claudette Colbert as Ruth, Lauren Bacall as Elvira and Mildred Natwick as Madame Arcati. A British commercial television adaptation in 1964 was directed by Joan Kemp-Welch, with Griffith Jones as Charles, Helen Cherry as Ruth, Joanna Dunham as Elvira and Hattie Jacques as Madame Arcati. Another American television TV production was presented in 1966 on Hallmark Hall of Fame, with Dirk Bogarde as Charles, Rachel Roberts as Ruth, Rosemary Harris as Elvira and Ruth Gordon as Madame Arcati.

=== Musical ===
The play was adapted into the musical High Spirits in 1964, with book, music and lyrics by Hugh Martin and Timothy Gray. It had a Broadway run of 375 performances, starring Edward Woodward as Charles, Louise Troy as Ruth, Tammy Grimes as Elvira and Beatrice Lillie as Madame Arcati. It had a three-month West End run in 1964–1965, with Denis Quilley as Charles, Jan Walters as Ruth, Marti Stevens as Elvira and Cicely Courtneidge as Madame Arcati.

=== Novelisation ===
The play was novelised by Charles Osborne in 2004.

== Awards and nominations ==
=== 1987 Broadway revival ===
Year	Award	Category	Nominee	Result
1987	Tony Award	Best Actress in a Play	Geraldine Page	Nominated

=== 2009 Broadway revival ===
Year	Award	Category	Nominee	Result
2009	Tony Award	Best Featured Actress in a Play	Angela Lansbury	Won
2009	Tony Award	Best Costume Design of a Play	Martin Pakledinaz	Nominated
2009	Drama Desk Award	Outstanding Revival of a Play		Nominated
2009	Drama Desk Award	Outstanding Featured Actress in a Play	Angela Lansbury	Won
2009	Drama Desk Award	Outstanding Direction of a Play	Michael Blakemore	Nominated
2009	Drama Desk Award	Outstanding Costume Design	Martin Pakledinaz	Nominated
2009	Outer Critics Circle Award	Outstanding Revival of a Play		Nominated
2009	Outer Critics Circle Award	Outstanding Featured Actress in a Play	Angela Lansbury	Won
2009	Outer Critics Circle Award	Outstanding Featured Actress in a Play	Susan Louise O'Connor	Nominated
2009	Outer Critics Circle Award	Outstanding Costume Design	Martin Pakledinaz	Nominated
2009	Theatre World Award		Susan Louise O'Connor	Won

=== 2014 West End revival ===
Year	Award	Category	Nominee	Result
2015	Laurence Olivier Award	Best Actress in a Supporting Role	Angela Lansbury	Won

== Notes, references and sources ==
=== Sources ===
- Billington, Michael (2023). "Introduction". Hay Fever. London: Methuen. ISBN 978-1-35-035411-1.
- Citron, Stephen (2005). Noel & Cole: the Sophisticates. Milwaukee: Hal Leonard Corporation. ISBN 978-0-634-09302-9.
- Coward, Noël (1941). Blithe Spirit. London: Samuel French. ISBN 978-0-573-01044-6.
- Coward, Noël (1954). Future Indefinite. London: Heinemann. OCLC 5002107.
- Day, Barry (2005). Coward on Film: The Cinema of Noël Coward. Lanham: Scarecrow Press. ISBN 978-0-8108-5358-4.
- Gaye, Freda, ed. (1967). Who's Who in the Theatre (fourteenth ed.). London: Sir Isaac Pitman and Sons. OCLC 5997224.
- Hall, Peter (1984). Peter Hall's Diaries. London: Hamish Hamilton. ISBN 978-0-241-11047-8.
- Hoare, Philip (1995). Noël Coward: A Biography. London: Sinclair-Stevenson. ISBN 978-1-85619-265-1.
- Lahr, John (1982). Coward the Playwright. London: Methuen. ISBN 978-0-413-48050-7.
- Lesley, Cole (1976). The Life of Noël Coward. London: Cape. ISBN 978-0-224-01288-1.
- Mander, Raymond; Joe Mitchenson (2000) [1957]. Theatrical Companion to Coward. Barry Day and Sheridan Morley (2000 edition, ed.) (second ed.). London: Oberon Books. ISBN 978-1-84002-054-0.
- Payn, Graham (1994). My Life with Noël Coward. New York: Applause Books. ISBN 978-1-55783-190-3.
- Pryce-Jones, David (1963). Graham Greene. Edinburgh: Oliver and Boyd. OCLC 652411719.
