= Present Laughter =

Play written by Noël Coward

James Donald (Roland) and Noël Coward (Garry) in the original production of Present Laughter

Present Laughter is a comic play written by Noël Coward in 1939, but not produced until 1942, because the Second World War began while it was in rehearsal, and the West End theatres closed. The title is drawn from a song in Shakespeare's Twelfth Night that urges carpe diem ("present mirth hath present laughter"). The play has been frequently revived in Britain, the US and beyond.

The plot depicts a few days in the life of the successful and self-obsessed light comedy actor Garry Essendine as he prepares to travel for a touring commitment in Africa. Amid a series of events bordering on farce, Garry has to deal with women who want to seduce him, placate both his long-suffering secretary and his wife, cope with a crazed young playwright, and overcome his impending mid-life crisis (he has recently turned forty). The character is a caricature of the author's real-life persona, as Coward acknowledged.

Coward starred as Garry during the original run, which began with a long provincial tour to accommodate wartime audiences. He reprised the role in the first British revival and later in the United States and Paris. Subsequent productions have featured Albert Finney, Peter O'Toole, Donald Sinden, Ian McKellen, Simon Callow and Andrew Scott, and in the United States Clifton Webb, Douglas Fairbanks Jr., George C. Scott, Frank Langella and Kevin Kline.

== Background ==
In April and May 1939 Noël Coward wrote two contrasting comedies, both with titles drawn from Shakespeare. One, This Happy Breed, was set in a modest suburban household; the other, originally titled Sweet Sorrow, later Present Laughter, depicted the affairs of a star actor. The title "Present Laughter" is drawn from the song "O Mistress Mine" in Twelfth Night, Act 2, Scene 3, which urges carpe diem ("present mirth hath present laughter"). (Note: The word present in the title is pronounced as the adjective /ˈprɛzənt/, and not the verb /prɪˈzɛnt/. "This happy breed", referring to the English nation, is a quotation from Richard II, Act 2, Scene 1; "sweet sorrow" is from Romeo and Juliet, Act 2, Scene 2.) The plot of Present Laughter had been forming in Coward's mind over the previous three years, but he recalled in his memoirs that once he began writing it, the play was completed in six days. He described it as "a very light comedy ... written with the sensible object of providing me with a bravura part". He planned to appear in both the new plays in the autumn of 1939, and they were in rehearsal for a pre-London tour when the Second World War began on 2 September; all theatres were closed by government order, and the production was shelved.

Between the outbreak of war and 1942 Coward worked for the British government, first in its Paris propaganda office and then for the secret service. In 1942 the prime minister, Winston Churchill, told Coward that he would do more good for the war effort by entertaining the troops and the home front: "Go and sing to them when the guns are firing – that's your job!" Though disappointed, Coward followed this advice. He toured, acted and sang indefatigably in Europe, Africa and Asia.

== Original production ==
Present Laughter was first staged at the beginning of a 25-week tour of Britain by Coward and his cast. His producer, Binkie Beaumont, was opposed to so long a provincial tour, and wanted to open at the Haymarket Theatre in London. Coward countered that in wartime conditions, "the provinces can't come to the West End any more, therefore the West End must go to the provinces". Present Laughter was first produced in Blackpool on 20 September 1942; Coward directed, and the sets and costumes were designed by Gladys Calthrop. The repertory of the tour also consisted of This Happy Breed and Blithe Spirit; the three were advertised collectively as "Noel Coward in his Play Parade". After playing in twenty-two towns and cities in England, Scotland and Wales, the tour ended with a six-week run at the Haymarket.

=== Original cast ===
- Daphne Stillington – Jennifer Gray
- Miss Erikson – Molly Johnson
- Fred – Billy Thatcher
- Monica Reed – Beryl Measor
- Garry Essendine – Noël Coward
- Liz Essendine – Joyce Carey
- Roland Maule – James Donald
- Henry Lyppiatt – Gerald Case
- Morris Dixon – Dennis Price
- Joanna Lyppiatt – Judy Campbell
- Lady Saltburn – Gwen Floyd

== Plot ==
All three acts of the play are set in Garry Essendine's London flat. He is a successful West End actor, who has just turned forty.

=== Act I ===
Daphne Stillington, a young admirer of the actor Garry Essendine, has inveigled herself into the flat and has spent the night there. Garry is still asleep, and while waiting for him to wake, Daphne encounters in turn three of his employees: the housekeeper (Miss Erikson), valet (Fred), and secretary (Monica). None of them display any surprise at her presence. Garry finally wakes and with practised smoothness ushers Daphne out.

Liz Essendine, who left Garry years ago, nevertheless remains part of his tightly-knit 'family' along with Monica and his manager, Morris Dixon, and producer, Henry Lyppiatt. Liz tells Garry that she suspects that Morris is having an affair with Henry's glamorous wife Joanna, and is concerned that this might break up the family. Their discussion is interrupted by the arrival of Roland Maule, an aspiring young playwright from Uckfield, whose play Garry has rashly agreed to critique. Liz leaves, and Roland rapidly becomes obsessively fascinated by Garry, who gets him off the premises as quickly as he can.

Morris and Henry arrive and discuss theatrical business with Garry. Henry leaves for a business trip abroad, and Garry privately interrogates Morris, who denies that he is having an affair with Joanna. Garry telephones Liz to reassure her.

=== Act II ===
Scene 1, midnight, three days later.

Garry, alone in the flat, answers the doorbell to find Joanna. She claims (like Daphne in Act I) to have forgotten her own door key and asks Garry to accommodate her in his spare room. He correctly suspects her motives, but after much skirmishing allows himself to be seduced.

Scene 2, the next morning.

Joanna emerges from the spare room wearing Garry's pyjamas just as Daphne did in Act I. She too encounters Miss Erikson, Fred, and then Monica, who is horrified at her presence in such compromising circumstances. Liz arrives and puts pressure on Joanna by threatening to tell Morris that Joanna has spent the night with Garry. Joanna retreats to the spare room when the doorbell rings, but the caller is not Morris but Roland Maule, who says he has an appointment with Garry. Monica leads him to an adjacent room to wait for Garry.

Frantic comings and goings follow, with the flustered arrivals and departures of Morris and Henry, Roland's pursuit of Garry, and the arrival of a Lady Saltburn, to whose niece Garry has promised an audition. The niece turns out to be Daphne Stillington, who recites the same Percy Bysshe Shelley poem, "We Meet Not as We Parted", with which he bade her farewell in Act I. Joanna flounces out from the spare room, Daphne faints with horror, Roland is entranced, and Garry is apoplectic.

=== Act III ===
A week later, on the eve of Garry's departure on tour in Africa, he is once more alone in the flat. The doorbell rings and Daphne enters saying she has a ticket to sail with him to Africa. The doorbell rings again, and Daphne retreats to an adjoining room. The new caller is Roland, who announces that he too has a ticket for the voyage to Africa. Garry tries to get him to leave, but as the doorbell rings a third time Roland bolts into the spare room and locks the door. The third caller is Joanna, who has also bought a ticket for the Africa voyage and has written a letter to Henry and Morris telling them everything. Liz arrives and saves the tottering situation, announcing that she too is travelling to Africa.

Henry and Morris arrive and berate Garry for his night with Joanna. Garry fights back by revealing the details of Morris and Joanna's affair, and Henry's extramarital adventures. Joanna angrily slaps Garry's face and leaves for good. Her departure goes unnoticed because Garry, Henry and Morris have become embroiled in what for them is a much more serious row when it emerges that Henry and Morris have committed Garry to appear at what he considers a shockingly unsuitable theatre. Garry objects: "I will not play a light French comedy to an auditorium that looks like a Gothic edition of Wembley Stadium." When that row has blown itself out, it is business as usual and Henry and Morris leave in good humour.

Liz pours Garry a brandy and tells him she is not only going to Africa with him but is coming back to him for good. Garry suddenly remembers Daphne and Roland lurking in the adjoining rooms and tells Liz: "You're not coming back to me... I'm coming back to you", and they tiptoe out.

== Revivals ==
The play has been regularly revived. Coward directed and starred in the first West End revival, in 1947. It ran for 528 performances; Carey once again played Liz, Moira Lister played Joanna, and Robert Eddison played Roland. Coward handed on the lead role to Hugh Sinclair in July 1947. The first West End revival after that was in 1965, with Nigel Patrick as Garry. (Note: Avice Landon played Monica, Phyllis Calvert, Liz, Maxine Audley, Joanna, and Richard Briers, Roland Maule.)

Notable successors in the role of Garry include Albert Finney (1977), (Note: Finney's cast included Eleanor Bron as Liz, and Diana Quick as Joanna.) Peter O'Toole (1978), who also played the role in a production at the Kennedy Center, Washington, D.C., in the same year, Donald Sinden (1981), (Note: The production also featured Dinah Sheridan as Liz, Gwen Watford as Monica and Julian Fellowes as Roland Maule.) Tom Conti (1993), (Note: In this production Gabrielle Drake played Monica and Jenny Seagrove, Joanna.) Peter Bowles (1996), Ian McKellen (1998), Rik Mayall (2003), and Simon Callow (2006). The National Theatre revived the play in 2007 and 2008 with Alex Jennings as Garry. (Note: Monica was played by Sarah Woodward, Lisa Dillon played Joanna.) More recent Garrys have included Samuel West (Theatre Royal, Bath, 2016), Rufus Hound (Chichester Festival Theatre, 2018), and Andrew Scott (Old Vic, 2019). (Note: He won the Olivier Award for the role. The production, directed by Matthew Warchus also featured Indira Varma as Liz, who also won an Olivier, and Sophie Thompson as Monica.)

Present Laughter was first staged in the US in 1946; after an out-of-town tour it opened on 29 October 1946 at the Plymouth Theatre on Broadway. It featured Clifton Webb as Garry and closed in March 1947 after 158 performances. In 1958 Coward appeared in New York, San Francisco and Los Angeles as Garry with Eva Gabor as Joanna. American successors in the role of Garry Essendine have included Douglas Fairbanks, Jr. (1975), (Note: Fairbanks played Garry in a production at the Kennedy Center, Washington, D.C, in March 1975. Jane Alexander played Liz and Ilka Chase played Monica.) George C. Scott (1982), (Note: Scott directed and starred in a revival at Circle in the Square Theatre, with Elizabeth Hubbard as Liz, Dana Ivey as Monica and Nathan Lane as Roland Maule. It ran for 175 performances.) Frank Langella (1996), (Note: Langella starred in a production at the Walter Kerr Theatre from 18 November 1996, with Allison Janney as Liz.) Victor Garber (2010), (Note: This production was at the American Airlines Theatre, with Lisa Banes as Liz, and Harriet Harris as Monica.) and Kevin Kline (2017). (Note: Produced at the St. James Theatre, with Kate Burton as Liz, Reg Rogers as Morris, Cobie Smulders as Joanna, and Kristine Nielsen as Monica. It ran for 101 performances.)

== Adaptations ==
=== Stage ===
Coward directed and starred in a French translation, Joyeux Chagrins, with the central character renamed Max Aramont. The production toured, beginning in Brussels, before opening at the Théâtre Édouard VII in Paris in 1948. In September 1996 a new French adaptation, titled Bagatelle was presented at the Théâtre de Paris, starring Michel Sardou in the lead role, now named Jean Delecour.

In 2026 Tracy-Ann Oberman plays Garry as a woman, Geri Essendine, in her own adaptation. Authorised by the Noel Coward Estate, the adaptation includes other sex-changed characters and is set in New York in 1977 at the heyday of Studio 54. Lindsay Posner directed, with designs by Peter McKintosh, and the production opened at the Theatre Royal, Bath, on 27 August 2026 before a UK tour set to run to November, with James Dreyfus as Monty and Adrian Lukis as Len.

=== Radio ===
In September 1956, the BBC broadcast a radio production with John Gielgud as Garry, Nora Swinburne as Liz and Mary Wimbush as Joanna. In 1974, Paul Scofield played the lead role for the BBC, with Fenella Fielding as Joanna, Patricia Routledge as Monica, Miriam Margolyes as Daphne, and Joy Parker (Scofield's real wife) as Liz. In April 2013, a radio adaptation was broadcast on BBC Radio 4, starring Samuel West as Garry.

=== Television ===
As part of the Play of the Week series in August 1964, four Coward plays directed and produced by Joan Kemp-Welch were transmitted on ITV, including Present Laughter, with Peter Wyngarde as Garry Essendine, Ursula Howells as Liz, Barbara Murray as Joanna and James Bolam as Roland Maule. In 1967 ITV broadcast a production starring Peter O'Toole as Garry, with Honor Blackman as Liz. The 1981 West End production starring Donald Sinden was filmed for BBC Television.

== Autobiographical references ==
Coward acknowledged that the central character, the egocentric actor Garry Essendine, was a self-caricature. Ben Brantley called the play "among the most shameless, if liveliest, self-addressed valentines in theater history." Coward repeats one of his signature theatrical devices at the end of the play, where the main characters tiptoe out as the curtain falls – a device that he also used in Private Lives, Hay Fever and Blithe Spirit.

In the 1970s the director Peter Hall wrote, "what a wonderful play it would be if – as Coward must have wanted – all those love affairs were about homosexuals". Whether or not Coward would have agreed, in the 1940s the transformation of real-life gay relationships into onstage straight ones was essential. The play nevertheless contains many references to Coward's own life. Monica is "unmistakably Lorn Loraine", Coward's long-serving and much-loved secretary. Morris has been seen as Coward's agent and sometime lover Jack Wilson, and Henry as Binkie Beaumont. Liz, played originally by Joyce Carey, is thought to be based partly on the actress herself, who was a member of Coward's inner circle.

== Critical reception and analysis ==
The notices for the first production were excellent. The Observer commented, "Mr Coward's production is so inventive, and his own performance so adroit in its mockery of the vain, posturing, and yet self-scrutinising and self-amused matinee idol, that Present Laughter is likely to be future mirth for as long as Mr Coward cares to run it." The Manchester Guardian added, "One is tempted to cast discretion to the winds and predict that this will be remembered as the best comedy of its kind and generation ... one of those rare occasions when the critic must claim the privilege of his fellow-playgoers, simply to marvel, admire, and enjoy wholeheartedly." When Coward brought the play back to the Haymarket in 1947, The Times praised it as "a wittily impudent and neatly invented burlesque of a French farce." When it was first seen in the West End without Coward, in 1959, The Times commented, "plays as funny as this are no longer being written in England."

In 1993 Ned Sherrin wrote, "Present Laughter is one of Coward's four great comedies of manners, along with Hay Fever, Private Lives and Blithe Spirit. It presents a masterly, exaggerated picture not only of the playwright but of his whole household, his court, his admirers, his lifestyle and his era." Brantley observed in The New York Times in 1995, "Yes, Coward was a terrible snob, and there is a certain smugness about Present Laughter that it's best not to examine too closely", but, "The sneaking wisdom of Present Laughter lies in its suggestion that actorly exaggeration and inner honesty are not mutually exclusive." In 1998 John Peter said that despite its period setting the play was timeless, and commented, "As in all the greatest comedies in the language, those of Shakespeare, Congreve and Wilde, the wit is both in the situations and the language." Reviewing the 2016 revival starring Samuel West, Lyn Gardner, in The Guardian, found the play "deeply unpleasant ... misogynistic and snobbish". Two years later the same paper's chief drama critic, Michael Billington, called it an "imperishable comedy".

Reviewing the 2019 Old Vic production, a critic in The Hollywood Reporter noted that "beneath the frantic surface is a subtle depiction of a man trapped by fame and his own image. ... Garry ... eagerly milks melodrama, hammily proclaiming his misfortunes, namely of being in perpetual service to his entourage. And having "acted" for so long offstage, he's reached the point where no one is willing to believe him when trying to be himself." Another, in The Financial Times, remarked that Garry's "susceptibility to flattery stems from a deep well of loneliness ... neediness ... drives Garry's hunger for affection". The reviewer of The Independent agreed, noting that the leading character's surname, Essendine, is an anagram of "neediness", and commented, "Coward's comedy asks us to wonder: who needs whom most – the sun or the planets that orbit it?"

== Awards and nominations ==
=== 1982 Broadway revival ===
Year	Award	Category	Nominee	Result
1983	Drama Desk Award	Outstanding Revival		Nominated
1983	Drama Desk Award	Outstanding Featured Actor in a Play	Nathan Lane	Nominated
1983	Drama Desk Award	Outstanding Featured Actress in a Play	Dana Ivey	Nominated
1983	Drama Desk Award	Outstanding Director of a Play	George C. Scott	Nominated
1983	Theatre World Award		Kate Burton	Won

=== 1996 Broadway revival ===
Year	Award	Category	Nominee	Result
1997	Tony Award	Best Revival of a Play		Nominated
1997	Drama Desk Award	Outstanding Revival of a Play		Nominated
1997	Drama Desk Award	Outstanding Actor in a Play	Frank Langella	Nominated
1997	Drama Desk Award	Outstanding Featured Actress in a Play	Allison Janney	Nominated
1997	Drama Desk Award	Outstanding Scenic Design of a Play	Derek McLane	Nominated
1997	Drama Desk Award	Outstanding Costume Design	Ann Roth	Nominated
1997	Theatre World Award		Allison Janney	Won

=== 2010 Broadway revival ===
Year	Award	Category	Nominee	Result
2010	Tony Award	Best Scenic Design of a Play	Alexander Dodge	Nominated

=== 2017 Broadway revival ===
Year	Award	Category	Nominee	Result
2017	Tony Award	Best Revival of a Play		Nominated
2017	Tony Award	Best Actor in a Play	Kevin Kline	Won
2017	Tony Award	Best Costume Design of a Play	Susan Hilferty	Nominated
2017	Drama Desk Award	Outstanding Actor in a Play	Kevin Kline	Won
2017	Drama Desk Award	Outstanding Costume Design of a Play	Susan Hilferty	Nominated
2017	Drama Desk Award	Outstanding Wig and Hair Design	Josh Marquette	Nominated
2017	Theatre World Award		Cobie Smulders	Honoree

=== 2019 West End revival ===
Year	Award	Category	Nominee	Result
2020	Laurence Olivier Award	Best Revival		Nominated
2020	Laurence Olivier Award	Best Actor	Andrew Scott	Won
2020	Laurence Olivier Award	Best Actress in a Supporting Role	Indira Varma	Won
2020	Laurence Olivier Award	Best Actress in a Supporting Role	Sophie Thompson	Nominated

== Notes, references and sources ==
=== Sources ===
- Billington, Michael (2023). "Introduction". Hay Fever. London: Methuen. ISBN 978-1-35-035411-1.
- Coward, Noël (1954). Future Indefinite. London: Heinemann. OCLC 5002107.
- Coward, Noël (1979). Plays: Four. London: Methuen. ISBN 978-0-413-46120-9.
- Day, Barry (2007). The Letters of Noël Coward. London: Methuen. ISBN 978-0-7136-8578-7.
- Farley, Alan (2013). "Interview with Judy Campbell". Speaking of Noel Coward. Bloomington: Author House. ISBN 978-1-4817-7324-9.
- Hall, Peter (1983). Diaries 1972–1980. London: Hamish Hamilton. ISBN 978-0-241-11285-4.
- Hoare, Philip (1995). Noël Coward, A Biography. London: Sinclair-Stevenson. ISBN 978-1-85619-265-1.
- Lahr, John (1982). Coward the Playwright. London: Methuen. ISBN 978-0-413-48050-7.
- Lesley, Cole (1976). The Life of Noël Coward. London: Cape. ISBN 978-0-224-01288-1.
- Mander, Raymond; Mitchenson, Joe; Day, Barry Day; Morley, Sheridan (2000) [1957]. Theatrical Companion to Coward (second ed.). London: Oberon. ISBN 978-1-84002-054-0.
- Morley, Sheridan (1974). A Talent to Amuse. London: Penguin. ISBN 978-0-14-003863-7.
- Morley, Sheridan (2005). Noël Coward. London: Haus. ISBN 978-1-904341-88-8.
- Shakespeare, William (1936). William Aldis Wright (ed.). The Complete Works of William Shakespeare: The Cambridge Edition. New York: Garden City. OCLC 5156462.
