= Casting the Runes (Mystery and Imagination) =

1968 episode of ABC TV series Mystery and Imagination

"Casting the Runes" is the first episode of the third series of the supernatural television anthology series Mystery and Imagination produced by ABC Television in 1968. Running at 50 minutes, it was first broadcast on 22 March 1968. It was based on the ghost story "Casting the Runes" by British writer and academic M. R. James, first published in 1911 as the fourth story in More Ghost Stories of an Antiquary, James' second collection of ghost stories. It is the first television adaptation of the story, with John Fraser as Dunning and Robert Eddison as Karswell.

== Synopsis ==
In 1905 the thin-skinned Julian Karswell is quick to anger and seeks revenge for every perceived slight. As a demonologist he is able to summon dark unseen forces to carry out his vindictive commands. When an academic association rejects his paper "The Truth of Alchemy" he does not take the rejection well. He makes enquiries to discover who turned his paper down, and discovers it was Edward Dunning. Dunning earns Karswell's wrath and soon begins to experience strange and disturbing events. He is shocked and angry when he discovers a memorial to his death, a month hence, in the window of a tram. He complains to the conductor of the tram who tries to rub off the message, but it seems to be within the glass itself. After Dunning leaves, the driver and the conductor turn to the message – but it is gone. When a disguised Karswell passes a hidden curse written in runes to Dunning, he must work out a way of passing it back to the wary Karswell before their disagreement leads to terrible consequences.

== Cast ==
- John Fraser as Dunning
- Robert Eddison as Karswell
- Gordon Jackson as Gayton
- Michael Lees as Harrington
- Richard Huggett as Mason
- Basil Henson as Dr Ramsay
- Julie Wallace as Ellen
- Michael Rothwell as vicar
- Ron Pember as conductor
- Neal Arden as driver
- Henry Kay as attendant
- John Barrett as coachman
- Robert Hunter as railwayman

== Adaptation ==
The television drama was produced by ABC Television to a script by Evelyn Frazer and was directed by Alan Cooke. Only a short three-minute excerpt is known to have survived.
