= Change Partners (film) =

1965 British film by Robert Lynn

- Directed by: Robert Lynn
- Written by: Donal Giltinan
- Produced by: Jack Greenwood
- Starring: Anthony Dawson; Zena Walker; Kenneth Cope
- Cinematography: James Wilson
- Edited by: Derek Holding
- Music by: Bernard Ebbinghouse
- Production company: Warner-Pathé
- Distributed by: Anglo-Amalgamated Film Distributors
- Release date: 1965
- Running time: 63 minutes
- Country: United Kingdom
- Language: English

Change Partners is a 1965 British crime drama directed by Robert Lynn and starring Anthony Dawson, Zena Walker and Kenneth Cope. It was written by Donal Giltinan and made at Merton Park Studios originally as a Warner-Pathé release, prior to being included as a part of the long-running series of Edgar Wallace Mysteries.

== Plot ==
Ben Arkwright and (Cedric) Ricky Gallen are partners in the firm of Arkwright and Gallen; however, Ricky is having an affair with Ben's wife, Anna. Anna talks Ricky into killing her alcoholic husband, but things do not go according to plan.

== Cast ==
- Anthony Dawson as Ben Arkwright
- Zena Walker as Anna Arkwright
- Basil Henson as (Cedric) Ricky Gallen
- Kenneth Cope as Joe Trent
- Jane Barrett as Betty Gallen
- Pamela Ann Davy as Jean
- Peter Bathurst as McIvor
- Graham Ashley as police constable
- Josephine Pritchard as Sally Morrison
- James Watts as waiter
- Vivien Lloyd as secretary

== Critical reception ==
The Monthly Film Bulletin wrote: "Zena Walker is no Bette Davis, but then director Robert Lynn is no William Wyler. None the less, she puts up an intelligent display of growing malevolence in this absurdly compelling, up-dated Warners-type melodrama, and is virtually the film's only raison d'étre. Actors like Basil Henson and Anthony Dawson haven't the resource to subdue the stilted, stereotyped dialogue, and the direction only rises above the mediocre in two chillingly staged murders, and one or two nicely composed shots of Zena Walker machinating."
