= Robert Brown (British actor) =

English actor (1921–2003)

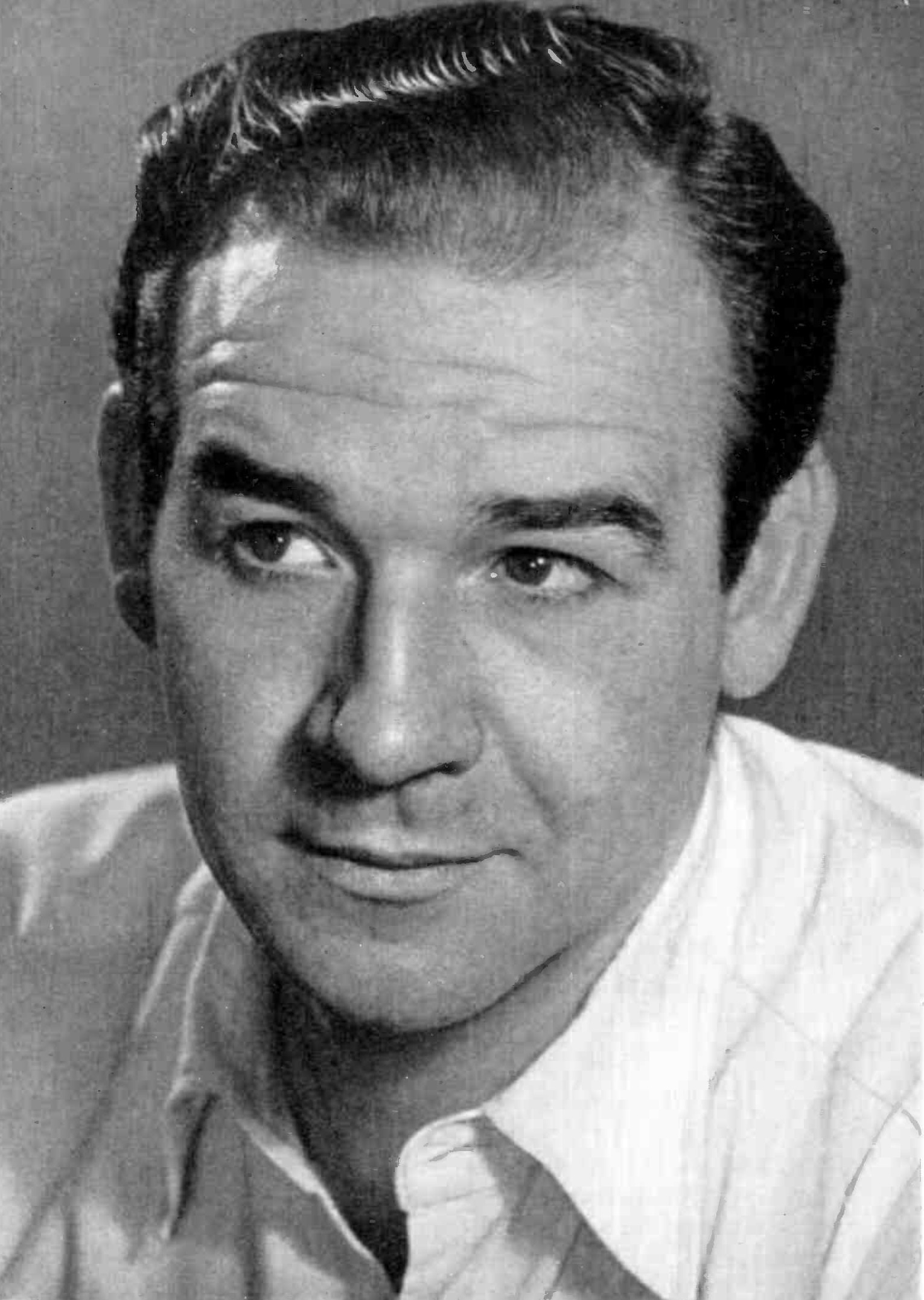
- Brown circa 1954
- Born: Robert James Brown; 23 July 1921; Swanage, Dorset, England
- Died: 11 November 2003 (aged 82); Swanage, Dorset, England
- Years active: 1949–1991
- Spouse: Rita Becker (m. 1955)
- Children: 2
- Parent: Robert Charles Brown

Robert James Brown (23 July 1921 – 11 November 2003) was an English actor, best known for his portrayal of M in the James Bond films from 1983 to 1989, succeeding Bernard Lee, who died in 1981.

Brown made his first appearance as M in Octopussy in 1983.

Brown was born in Swanage, Dorset, and later died there on November 11, 2003, aged 82. Before appearing in the Bond films, he had a long career as a supporting actor in films and television. He had a starring role in the 1950s television series Ivanhoe, where he played Gurth, the faithful companion of Ivanhoe, played by Roger Moore. He had previously made an uncredited appearance as a castle guard in the unrelated 1952 film Ivanhoe. He had an uncredited appearance as the galley-master in Ben-Hur (1959) and as factory worker Bert Harker in the BBC's 1960s soap opera The Newcomers. In One Million Years B.C. (1966), he played grunting caveman Akhoba, brutal head of the barbaric "Rock tribe".

Brown first started in the James Bond franchise in the film The Spy Who Loved Me as Admiral Hargreaves, appearing alongside Bernard Lee. After Lee's death in January 1981, Broccoli and the other producers decided to leave M out of For Your Eyes Only out of respect for Lee, and they assigned his lines to M's Chief of Staff, Bill Tanner. In 1983, Brown was hired to portray M on the recommendation of Bond actor Roger Moore, his Ivanhoe co-star and the father of Brown's goddaughter Deborah. It was never clearly established if Brown was the same M as Lee's character, or a different M, perhaps a promoted Hargreaves. In 1995, Brown was succeeded as M by Judi Dench in GoldenEye. Brown died from cancer in November 2003.

== Filmography ==
Altogether, Robert Brown starred in five James Bond films.

- The Spy Who Loved Me (1977) – Admiral Hargreaves (possibly the same character he played as M in subsequent films)
- Octopussy (1983) – M
- A View to a Kill (1985) – M
- The Living Daylights (1987) – M
- Licence to Kill (1989) – M

Other films:

- The Third Man (1949) – Policeman in sewer (coincidentally Bernard Lee is also in this film) (uncredited)
- Out of True (1951) – Dr. Dale
- The Dark Man (1951) – Policeman at Hospital (uncredited)
- Cloudburst (1951) – Carter
- Death of an Angel (1952) – Jim Pollard (uncredited)
- Derby Day (1952) – Foster – Berkeley's Butler (uncredited)
- Ivanhoe (1952) – Castle Guard (uncredited)
- Time Gentlemen, Please! (1952) – Bill Jordan
- The Gambler and the Lady (1952) – John – Waiter at Max's Dive (uncredited)
- Noose for a Lady (1953) – Jonas Rigg
- The Large Rope (1953) – Mick Jordan
- Passage Home (1955) – Shane
- The Dark Avenger (1955) – First French Knight
- Helen of Troy (1956) – Polydorus
- Lost (1956) – Farmer with Shotgun (uncredited)
- The Man Who Never Was (1956) – French (uncredited)
- A Hill in Korea (1956) – Private O'Brien
- Kill Me Tomorrow (1957) – Steve Ryan
- The Steel Bayonet (1957) – Company Sergeant Major Gill
- The Abominable Snowman (1957) – Ed Shelley
- Campbell's Kingdom (1957) – Ben Creasy
- Passport to Shame (1958) – Mike
- Shake Hands with the Devil (1959) – First Sergeant 'Black & Tans'
- Ben-Hur (1959) – Rowing Overseer (uncredited)
- Sink the Bismarck! (1960) – unnamed officer aboard HMS King George V (uncredited)
- The Challenge (1960) – Bob Crowther
- Sands of the Desert (1960) – 1st Tourist
- A Story of David (1961) – Jashobeam
- The 300 Spartans (1962) – Pentheus
- Live Now – Pay Later (1962) – (unconfirmed)
- Billy Budd (1962) – Arnold Talbot
- The Double, (Edgar Wallace Mysteries) – Richard Harrison
- Mystery Submarine (1963) – Coxswain Drage
- Dr. Syn, Alias the Scarecrow (1963) – Sam Farley
- The Masque of the Red Death (1964) – Guard
- Clash by Night (1963) – Mawsley
- Operation Crossbow (1965) – Air Commodore
- One Million Years B.C. (1966) – Akhoba
- Un hombre solo (1969)
- Private Road (1971) – Mr Halpern
- Fun and Games (1971) – Ralph
- Wreck Raisers (1972) – Cox'n
- Demons of the Mind (1972) – Fischinger
- Mohammad, Messenger of God (1976) – Otba
- Jesus of Nazareth (1977, TV Mini-Series) – Pharisee
- Warlords of Atlantis (1978) – Briggs
- The Passage (1979) – Major
- Lion of the Desert (1981) – Al Fadeel
- The Forgotten Story (1983, TV series) – Captain Stevens
- Jugando con la muerte (1982) – 2nd bodyguard

Acting roles
Preceded by Bernard Lee	M actor in James Bond films 1983 – '89	Succeeded by Judi Dench
