= A Place of One's Own =

1945 film

- Australian theatrical release poster
- Directed by: Bernard Knowles
- Written by: Brock Williams
- Based on: A Place of One's Own by Osbert Sitwell
- Produced by: R. J. Minney
- Starring: James Mason; Barbara Mullen; Margaret Lockwood; Dennis Price; Dulcie Gray
- Cinematography: Stephen Dade
- Edited by: Charles Knott
- Music by: Hubert Bath
- Production company: Gainsborough Pictures
- Distributed by: Eagle-Lion Distributors
- Release dates: 28 May 1945; (UK); 1949 (USA)
- Running time: 92 minutes
- Country: United Kingdom
- Language: English

A Place of One's Own is a 1945 British film directed by Bernard Knowles and starring James Mason, Barbara Mullen, Margaret Lockwood, Dennis Price and Dulcie Gray. It was written by Brock Williams based on the 1940 novel of the same title by Osbert Sitwell, and was one of the cycle of Gainsborough melodramas. The film was not released in the US until 1949.

== Plot ==
The Smedhursts, newly retired, buy Bellingham House, which has been vacant for over 40 years and is rumoured to be haunted by the previous owner, Elizabeth, who is widely believed to have been murdered by her guardians. Mrs Smedhurst employs a young lady, Annette, as a companion. Annette becomes haunted by Elizabeth, who is waiting for her lover, Dr Marsham. Mr Smedhurst asks the police to find Dr Marsham, and he comes to visit Annette/Elizabeth. The next morning, everyone in the house feels "lighter" and Annette wakes up recovered. A local policeman arrives and announces that Dr Marsham has been found but will not be able to visit as he has died...

== Cast ==
- Margaret Lockwood as Annette
- James Mason as Mr. Smedhurst
- Barbara Mullen as Mrs. Smedhurst
- Dennis Price as Dr. Robert Selbie
- Helen Haye as Mrs. Manning-Tutthorn
- Michael Shepley as Major Manning-Tutthorn
- Dulcie Gray as Sarah
- Moore Marriott as George
- O. B. Clarence as Perkins
- Helen Goss as Rosie, the barmaid
- Edie Martin as Cook
- Gus McNaughton as Police Constable Hargreaves
- Muriel George as nurse
- John Turnbull as Sir Roland Jervis
- Ernest Thesiger as Dr. Richard Marsham
- Henry B. Longhurst as Inspector
- Aubrey Mallalieu as Canon Mowbray

== Production ==
This was the first time Margaret Lockwood used a beauty spot on her cheek in a film, which became a trademark.

Vernon Sewell said he was going to direct the film but then Maurice Ostrer asked him to make Madonna of the Seven Moons instead. Sewell refused and left Gainsborough.

== Reception ==
According to Kinematograph Weekly the film performed well at the British box office in 1945. Tha paper worte: "Intriguing and holding story, very good characterisation, feminine angle and big star values."

The Monthly Film Bulletin wrote: "There is much charm in the settings, in the art work (in which Rex Whistler is credited with sharing), and in the warmly sympathetic roles written for Mason and Barbara Mullen. These two and Margaret Lockwood make an attractive team, and many will wish that they had better material than they have here."

The Daily Film Renter wrote: "Lavish grade 'A' production creates leisurely atmosphere of 1900's, Effective character studies by stars and supporting cast. Dependable popular entertainment with romantic appeal."

== Reflections by Mason ==
James Mason wrote in his memoirs that when he read the script "not only did I enthuse but I even asked that I might be permitted to play the role of the elderly retiree in the story."

Tthe film was considered a financial disappointment. Mason later wrote:

Of course it could have turned out a failure even if the most suitable actor in the world had played that part. But the reactions of the top brass at the studio did nothing to allay my own feeling of guilt for having volunteered my services. In any case it was not that I was incapable of turning my hand to a character part, it was just that I had amassed what I always realized was an absurd degree of popularity, and the fan population wanted me to appear only as some heroic young lady-killer; or better-still, ladybasher. ... Knowles deserved his share [of blame] because he had never got over Citizen Kane and still thought that it was a shortcut to success if one had the actors play immensely long sequences without any intercutting or covering shots. In Citizen Kane the director could afford to do this because Herman Mankiewicz had revised one strong situation after another.
