= The Double (1963 film) =

1963 British film by Lionel Harris

- Theatrical release poster
- Directed by: Lionel Harris
- Screenplay by: Lindsay Galloway
- Based on: a story by Edgar Wallace
- Produced by: Jack Greenwood
- Starring: Jeanette Sterke; Alan MacNaughtan; Robert Brown
- Edited by: E.B. Jarvis
- Production company: Merton Park Studios
- Distributed by: Anglo-Amalgamated
- Release date: 15 September 1963
- Running time: 56 minutes
- Country: United Kingdom
- Language: English

The Double is a 1963 second feature British film directed by Lionel Harris and starring Jeanette Sterke, Alan MacNaughtan and Robert Brown. Part of the series of Edgar Wallace Mysteries films made at Merton Park Studios, it is based on a story by Wallace.

== Plot ==
John Cleeve is suffering from amnesia. He believes he has killed a man named Derreck Alwyn. Mary Winston investigates. Her solicitor, Harrison, finds a photograph of the still-living Alwyn, whom Cleeve recognises the man he has "killed". Mary realises her investigations are being hampered by Harrison, who is in the pay of Alwyn. Cleeve regains his memory and Mary's sister Jane realises that Alwyn is an impostor, who had previously tried to kill Cleeve (the real Alwyn). On her way to move her car, Jane is waylaid and captured by the imposter; she is tied up (hand and foot) and gagged, and then left in a locked storage room. The impostor comes again to see Cleeve, in order to try and murder him. In a tense scene on top of a staircase, the police arrive in time, Cleeve jumps out of his wheelchair, and the impostor dies after falling down the stairs. Cleeve is able to knock down the locked storage room door, where he rescues and frees the bound and gagged Jane.

== Cast ==
- Jeanette Sterke as Mary Winston
- Alan MacNaughtan as John Cleeve
- Robert Brown as Richard Harrison
- Jane Griffiths as Jane Winston
- Basil Henson as Derreck Alwyn
- Anne Lawson as Sally Carter
- Diane Clare as Selena Osmonde
- Llewellyn Rees as Bradshaw
- John Miller as Sir Harry Osmonde
- Dorothea Rundle as Martha Bradshaw
- Hamilton Dyce as Det. Ins. Ames
- Henry McCarthy as Dr. Leighton
- Tony Wall as Logan
- Patrick Parnell as Cooper
- Arlette Dobson as Karen
- David Charlesworth as Charles
- Brian McGrellis as delivery boy
- Ron Eagleton as porter
- Derek Sumner as policeman
- Thelma Holt as Marie

== Critical reception ==
The Monthly Film Bulletin wrote: "Yet another Edgar Wallace thriller. This fundamentally uninteresting film tries hard to fill out its hour with unnecessary plot twists and a proliferation of characters. But the basis of the story becomes clear after approximately ten minutes, and the two well-timed and genuinely frightening moments of suspense seem wasted on such a glaringly inadequate script."
