= How Are They at Home? =

1944 play by J. B. Priestley

- Written by: J.B. Priestley
- Original language: English
- Genre: Comedy

Premiere
- Date premiered: 27 March 1944
- Place premiered: New Theatre in Oxford

How Are They at Home? is a 1944 comedy play by the British writer J.B. Priestley. It features a series of comical episodes revolving around life in wartime Britain.

It premiered at the New Theatre in Oxford before transferring to Apollo Theatre in London's West End where it ran for 164 performances from 4 May to 14 October 1944. The London cast included George Carney, Henry Charles Hewitt, Ralph Truman, John Slater, Peter Jones, John Salew, Patricia Laffan, Hella Kürty, Jennifer Gray, Mignon O'Doherty, Jane Carr and Betty Stockfield. It was produced by Basil Dean.

== Bibliography ==
- Fagge, Roger. The Vision of J.B. Priestley. A&C Black, 2011.
- Gale, Maggie B. J.B. Priestley. Routledge, 2008.
- Wearing, J. P. The London Stage 1940–1949: A Calendar of Productions, Performers, and Personnel. Rowman & Littlefield, 2014.
