= Hamilton Dyce =

English actor (1912–1972)

- Dyce in 1968
- Born: 14 March 1912; Sandhurst, Kent; England, UK
- Died: 8 January 1972 (aged 59); Surrey, England, UK
- Occupation: Actor
- Years active: 1937–1972

Hamilton Dyce (14 March 1912 – 8 January 1972) was an English stage, film and television actor.

Dyce's television work included the 1970 Doctor Who serial Spearhead from Space, in which he played General Scobie.

== Selected filmography ==
- Whistle Down the Wind (1961) - Mr. Reeves
- Mrs. Gibbons' Boys (1962) - PC Draper
- Master Spy (1963) - Airport Controller
- Dr. Crippen (1963) - Dr. Rogers
- The Double (1963)
- Becket (1964) - Bishop of Chichester
- The Comedy Man (1964) - Burial Minister (uncredited)
- King Rat (1965) - The Padre
- Sky West and Crooked (1966) - Bill Slim - grave digger
- The Wrong Box (1966) - Derek Lloyd Peter Digby
- Two Gentlemen Sharing (1969) - Dickson Senior
- Unman, Wittering and Zigo (1971) - Mr. Winstanley
- On the Run (1971) - Removal Man
- The Pied Piper (1972) - Papal Nuncio (Last appearance)
