= Harris and Selwyn Theaters =

Twin theaters in Chicago, Illinois, U.S.

Coordinates: 41.8848°N 87.6299°W

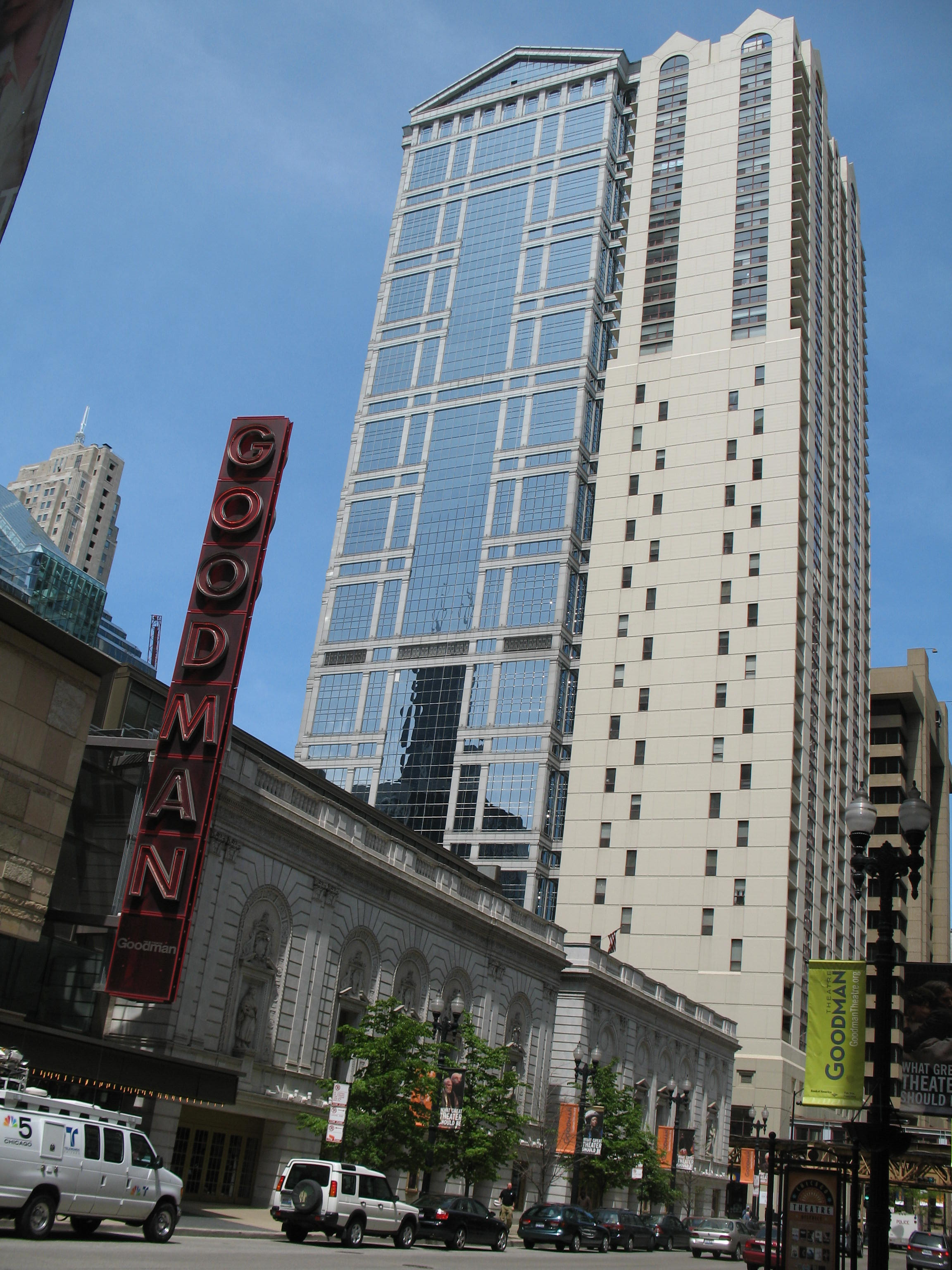
- Harris and Selwyn Theaters buildings (right foreground) with new Goodman Theatre occupant.

General information
- Location: 180-190 N. Dearborn St. Chicago, IL, Illinois, United States
- Completed: 1922

Design and construction
- Architects: C. Howard Crane and H. Kenneth Franzheim

Chicago Landmark
- Designated: March 31, 1983

The Harris and Selwyn Theaters are twin theatres located in the Loop community area of Chicago, Illinois. They were built by Sam H. Harris and Archie and Edgar Selwyn. They were designated a Chicago Landmark on March 31, 1983. They have been redesigned by the Goodman Theatre, which is located in them.

The Harris and the Selwyn originally operated as live playhouses. Among the plays presented at the Harris was the Chicago run of "A Streetcar Named Desire." Both theatres were purchased by producer Michael Todd and converted into movie theaters in the 1950s. The Harris was renamed The Michael Todd Theatre, and the Selwyn renamed Michael Todd's Cinestage. The Harris occasionally presented live performances during this period, such as a production of "Two for the Seesaw" starring Ruth Roman. Both theatres were closed by the beginning of the 1980s, but were briefly re-opened in 1986 as the short-lived Dearborn Cinemas.

In 2000, the two theaters were completely gutted and rebuilt as part of the Goodman Theatre. The landmarked exteriors were retained as part of the new building.
