= John Fraser (actor) =

Scottish actor and author (1931–2020)

- Picturegoer postcard, 1950s
- Born: John Alexander Fraser; 18 March 1931; Glasgow, Scotland
- Died: 7 November 2020 (aged 89)
- Occupations: Actor; writer
- Years active: 1952–1996
- Partner: Rodney Pienaar

John Alexander Fraser (18 March 1931 – 7 November 2020) was a Scottish actor and author. He is best known for his performances in the films The Dam Busters (1955), The Good Companions (1957), The Trials of Oscar Wilde (1960), El Cid (1961), Repulsion (1965) and Isadora (1968).

Fraser received a BAFTA nomination for Best British Actor for his performance as Lord Alfred Douglas in The Trials of Oscar Wilde.

== Career ==
One of his earliest roles was as Inigo Jollifant in the second film version of J.B. Priestley's The Good Companions (1957). Later, Fraser had leading roles in films such as El Cid, Tunes of Glory, The Trials of Oscar Wilde (playing Lord Alfred Douglas), Roman Polanski's Repulsion, Isadora and Schizo. He made appearances on television series including Danger Man (1964), Casting the Runes (1968), Randall and Hopkirk (1969), Columbo (1972), Doctor Who (1981), and The Bill (1995).

He released several singles in the late 1950s.

In 2004, he published his autobiography, Close Up, in which he wrote frankly about his gay life and friendships. In the book, Fraser wrote that actor Laurence Harvey was gay and that his long-term lover was his manager James Woolf. Of Dirk Bogarde, Fraser wrote, "Dirk's life with [Anthony] Forwood had been so respectable, their love for each other so profound and so enduring, it would have been a glorious day for the pursuit of understanding and the promotion of tolerance if he had screwed up the courage ... to make one dignified allusion to his true nature. Self-love is no substitute for self-respect."

== Personal life and death ==
Fraser was gay. He later said that he had refused to "live a lie", and believed that his sexuality had affected his career in an era when male homosexuality remained criminalised in Britain.

Fraser's long-term partner was Rodney Pienaar, an artist whom he met while working in South Africa in the 1970s. The couple later settled in Tuscany, but returned to live in London in 2010.

Fraser died from oesophageal cancer on 6 November 2020 at the age of 89, and was survived by his partner of 42 years.

== Awards and nominations ==
Year	Award	Category	Work	Result
1961	British Academy Film Awards	Best British Actor	The Trials of Oscar Wilde	Nominated

== Selected filmography ==
Year	Title	Role	Awards / Notes
1953	The Good Beginning	Johnny Lipson	
1953	Valley of Song	Cliff Lloyd	
1953	The Desert Rats	Artillery Man	
1953	Titanic	Steward	
1954	The Face That Launched a Thousand Ships	Drago	
1955	Touch and Go	Richard Kenyon	
1955	The Dam Busters	Flight Lieutenant John Hopgood DFC	
1957	The Good Companions	Inigo Jollifant	
1958	The Wind Cannot Read	Peter Munroe	
1960	The Trials of Oscar Wilde	Lord Alfred Douglas	BAFTA nomination
1960	Tunes of Glory	Corporal Piper Ian Fraser	
1961	El Cid	Prince Alfonso	
1961	Fury at Smugglers' Bay	Christopher Trevenyan	
1962	Waltz of the Toreadors	Lt. Finch	
1963	Tamahine	Richard Poole	
1965	A Study in Terror	Lord Carfax	
1965	Repulsion	Colin	
1965	Operation Crossbow	Flight Lieutenant Kenny	
1966	Doctor in Clover	Miles Grimsdyke	.
1968	Isadora	Roger	
1975	The Doll	Peter Matty	3 episodes
1976	Schizo	Leonard Hawthorne	
1978	Wilde Alliance	Colonel Stone	Episode: The Private Army of Colonel Stone
1980	Lady Killers	John Church	Episode: Not for the Nervous
1981	Lady Killers	Hawley Harvey Crippen	Episode: Miss Elmore
1981	Doctor Who: Logopolis	The Monitor	
1982	Young Sherlock: The Mystery of the Manor House	Uncle Gideon	6 episodes
1996	Truth or Dare	Gordon Hillan	

== Selected recordings ==
- 1957 - Bye Bye Love / Why Don't They Understand
- 1958 - Presenting John Fraser (EP) with Tony Osborne, the Beryl Stott Group, the Kim Drake Orchestra
- 1958 - Trolley Stop / Bye Bye Love with the Beryl Stott Group
- 1959 - Bye Bye Baby Goodbye
- 1960 - Jaula Dorada / Adios Adios Muchacha / Adios Amor / Por Que No Comprenden

== Bibliography of works ==
- Fraser, John (2007). The Wild Beast May Break Them. Troubador Publishing Ltd. ISBN 978-1-906221-26-3.
- Fraser, John (2004). Close Up. Oberon. ISBN 1-84002-504-2.
- Fraser, J. (1986). In Place of Reason. Macmillan. ISBN 0-333-40718-0.
- Fraser, J. (1978). The Bard in the Bush. Granada. ISBN 0-246-11014-7.
- Fraser, J. (1969). Clap Hands If You Believe in Fairies. Collins. ISBN 0-00-221116-5.
