= A Place of One's Own (novel) =

1940 novel

- First edition
- Author: Osbert Sitwell
- Language: English
- Genre: Mystery
- Publisher: Macmillan
- Publication date: 1940
- Media type: Print

A Place of One's Own is a mystery novel written by the British author Osbert Sitwell that was published in 1940. Belonging to the ghost story genre, the novel was an extension of a short story that Sitwell had previously written. The plot follows the lives of an elderly couple at the turn of the twentieth century who move into a new house, only to discover that it appears to be haunted.

== Adaptation ==
In 1945 it was adapted into a British film of the same title produced by Gainsborough Pictures. Directed by Bernard Knowles and starring James Mason and Margaret Lockwood, it was part of the group of Gainsborough Melodramas. Sitwell collaborated on the screenplay with Brock Williams.

== Bibliography ==
- Cevasco, George A. The Sitwells: Edith, Osbert, and Sacheverell. Twayne Publishers, 1987.
- Goble, Alan. The Complete Index to Literary Sources in Film. Walter de Gruyter, 1999.
- McFarlane, Brian . Four from the forties: Arliss, Crabtree, Knowles and Huntington. Manchester University Press, 2018.
- Parker, Elaine. The Price of Fame: The Biography of Dennis Price. Fonthill Media, 2018.
