= Graham Dowson =

Graham Randall Dowson (13 January 1923 – 10 June 2006) was a British business executive best known for being a close association with John Davis at the Rank Organisation.

Dowson was born in Southend, Essex, England on 13 January 1923.

For many years Dowson was Davis' deputy eventually becoming Chief Executive of Rank in 1974.

Dowson's appointment led to a power struggle with Rank, acerbated by the fact Dowson refused to marry a close friend of Davis' future wife. This resulted in Dowson being fired from Rank and given a pay out of £150,000.

In the 1960s Dowson had been marketing director of Rank for six years before being appointed Davis's assistant in 1967. After leaving Rank Dowson did various jobs, including working for Erskine House and Nimslo.

Dowson died on 10 June 2006, at the age of 83.
