= This Happy Breed =

Play by Noël Coward

Coward in This Happy Breed

This Happy Breed is a play by Noël Coward. It was written in 1939 but, because of the outbreak of World War II, it was not staged until 1942, when it was performed on alternating nights with another Coward play, Present Laughter. The two plays later alternated with Coward's Blithe Spirit. The title, a reference to the English people, is a phrase from John of Gaunt's monologue in Act II, Scene 1 of Shakespeare's Richard II.

The story of the play concerns the lower middle-class Gibbons family between the end of World War I and the outbreak of World War II. It anticipates the non-violent ways in which social justice issues might be incorporated into post-war national reconstruction, examines the personal trauma caused by the sudden death of sons and daughters and anticipates the forthcoming return of English men from the war. It is also an intimate portrait of the economy and politics of Great Britain in the 1920s and 1930s (such as the General Strike of 1926), as well as showing the advances in technology – the arrival of primitive crystal radio sets and telephones, home gas lights being replaced by electricity and mass broadcast radio.

This Happy Breed is one of a very few Coward plays to deal entirely with domestic events outside an upper class or upper middle class setting. A number of scenes are reminiscent of previous Coward works, such as Cavalcade (1931) or the short play Fumed Oak from Tonight at 8.30 (1936).

== Background ==
Coward completed the playscript for This Happy Breed (as well as that for Present Laughter) in 1939, in the months before World War II. The producer Binkie Beaumont originally wanted to stage Present Laughter on its own, but Coward insisted that, given the political situation at the time, it should be played alternately with the more sombre This Happy Breed. The original script called for the abdication speech of King Edward VIII to be heard on the radio by the Gibbons family in Act 3 scene 1, but the Lord Chamberlain (Britain's official play censor until 1968) objected to its inclusion, citing the embarrassment it would cause any member of the royal family who happened to see the play. The final dress rehearsal was held on 31 August 1939. The following day Germany invaded Poland; Britain declared war on Germany on 3 September, and the production was immediately abandoned.

Coward departed for Paris to meet Jean Giraudoux, who wanted the playwright to set up a Bureau of Propaganda and serve as a liaison with the Commissariat d'Information. Coward engaged in war work in intelligence and propaganda in Europe and America for the next two years. Winston Churchill advised Coward that he could do more for the war effort by entertaining the troops and the home front than by attempts at intelligence work: "Go and sing to them when the guns are firing – that's your job!" Though disappointed, Coward followed this advice. He toured, acted and sang indefatigably in Europe, Africa, Asia and America. This Happy Breed and Present Laughter were finally staged in September 1942 in Blackpool on Coward's wartime tour of Britain after he returned to acting. The sets and costumes were designed by Gladys Calthrop.

Coward later said, "I have always had a reputation for high-life, earned no doubt in the twenties with such plays as The Vortex. But, as you see, I was a suburban boy, born and bred in the suburbs of London, which I've always loved and always will." This Happy Breed, like his short play Fumed Oak, is one of his rare stage depictions of suburban life.

== Plot ==
=== Act 1 ===
Scene 1 – June 1919

The Gibbons family has just moved into 17 Sycamore Road in Clapham in South London. Ethel expresses her relief that her husband, Frank, has survived army service in World War I and her pleasure at moving into their new home. Their new next-door neighbour, Bob Mitchell, introduces himself. He turns out to be an old army colleague of Frank's, and the two reminisce.

Scene 2 – December 1925

After Christmas dinner the grown-ups (Frank and Ethel, Ethel's mother, Mrs Flint, and Frank's sister, Sylvia) have retired to another room to leave the young people (Frank and Ethel's children: Vi, "a pleasant nondescript-looking girl of twenty"; Queenie, "a year younger... prettier and a trifle flashy"; and Reg, aged eighteen, "a nice-looking intelligent boy", Reg's friend Sam and Queenie's friend Phyllis) alone. Sam indulges in a spot of socialist preaching against capitalism and injustice. The young women fail to accord him the respect he thinks he deserves, and he and Reg leave. Bob Mitchell's son Billy visits the house. He is left alone with Queenie, and there is a short love scene between them. Queenie baffles him by saying that she so hates suburban life that she would not make him a good wife and rushes out. Frank enters and encourages Billy. After Billy leaves, Ethel and Frank chat together, partly to avoid Sylvia's singing in the room next door and partly for the pleasure of each other's company.

Scene 3 – May 1926

It is the time of the General Strike of 1926. The women of the household bicker. Frank and Bob are strike-breaking as volunteer driver and conductor of a London bus. Reg, encouraged by Sam, is backing the strikers and has not been seen for some days. Frank and Bob enter, singing "Rule, Britannia!" at the top of their voices, having had a few drinks to celebrate their successful strike-breaking. Sam and Reg enter, the latter slightly injured from a fracas connected with the strike. Vi confronts Sam for leading Reg astray and throws him out. Left alone together, Frank and Reg exchange views, Frank's being traditionalist and Reg's idealistic. They bid each other good night on good terms.

=== Act 2 ===
Scene 1 – October 1931

On Reg's wedding day, Frank gives him paternal advice. The women of the household bicker. Queenie again complains of the tedium of suburban life. The family all leave for Reg and Phyl's wedding ceremony.

Scene 2 – November 1931, midnight

Queenie tip-toes downstairs in street clothes, carrying a suitcase. She puts a letter on the mantelpiece and leaves. Frank and Bob arrive after a convivial evening at a regimental dinner and amiably discuss the world in general. Ethel, woken by their noise, tells them off. Bob leaves. Frank and Ethel see Queenie's letter and open it. She has been having an affair with a married man and has run off with him. Ethel disowns Queenie as a member of the family. Frank is shocked at Ethel's intransigence. They retire to bed unhappily.

Scene 3 – May 1932

The older members of the family discuss a letter they have received from Queenie in France. They are interrupted by the news that Reg and his wife have been killed in a road accident.

=== Act 3 ===
Scene 1 – December 1936

The family have been listening to ex-king Edward VIII's abdication broadcast. In the intervening time, Mrs Flint has died, and Vi and Sam, now married, have become comfortably middle-aged. Billy enters with the news that he has run into Queenie in Menton. Her lover had left her and returned to his wife, leaving Queenie stranded. After some prevarication Billy says that Queenie is with him and indeed is now his wife. Queenie enters, and there is an awkward but loving reconciliation between her and Ethel.

Scene 2 – September 1938

It is the time of Neville Chamberlain's return from Munich and the false hopes of averting war. Sylvia is as delighted by the Munich Agreement as Frank is bitterly opposed to it. Bob comes in to say goodbye. He is moving to the country. He and Frank reminisce and look forward to the future anxiously.

Scene 3 – June 1939

Frank and Ethel are about to move to the country. The house is now almost empty of furniture as they prepare to leave. Frank is left alone with his youngest grandchild, also called Frank. He talks to the baby philosophically, in a long monologue about what it means to be British. Ethel calls him to supper.

== Original cast ==
- Mrs Flint – Gwen Floyd
- Ethel Gibbons – Judy Campbell
- Sylvia Gibbons – Joyce Carey
- Frank Gibbons – Noël Coward
- Bob Mitchell – Gerald Case
- Reg Gibbons – Billy Thatcher
- Queenie Gibbons/Mitchell – Jennifer Gray
- Vi Gibbons/Leadbitter – Molly Johnson
- Sam Leadbitter – Dennis Price
- Edie – Beryl Measor
- Billy Mitchell – James Donald

== Critical reception ==
The Times, noting that This Happy Breed had opened the night after the London première of Present Laughter, commented, "both plays, though widely separated in mood and kind, are successful, the one attaining to brilliant comedy, the other creating and sustaining an interest in a family of the lower middle class which may fairly be called absorbing.... Mr Coward keeps firm control of his narrative and in his own part occasionally permits himself to speak for an England which, though tired, is still possessed of an invincible stamina." The Manchester Guardian thought some of the scenes too long, but added "the author's skill is shown in each one, unabated and breaking fresh ground; the play obviously moved and excited the audience, and we must admit, once again, that Mr Coward remains one of the most remarkable men of the theatre of our time." The Daily Express wrote, "Mr Coward's Clapham cavalcade is perfectly acted. It is history dramatised in the back parlour and a most moving portrait of small people living greatly.

== Adaptations ==
A 1944 film adaptation, also called This Happy Breed, was directed by David Lean and starred Robert Newton and Celia Johnson.

In 1989 BBC Radio 4 broadcast a radio adaptation of the play, starring John Moffatt, Rosemary Leach, Anna Cropper and Doris Hare. The audio play was released on CD in 2011, part of the Classic Radio Theatre series.
