= Adaptations of works by M. R. James =

Ghost Writer

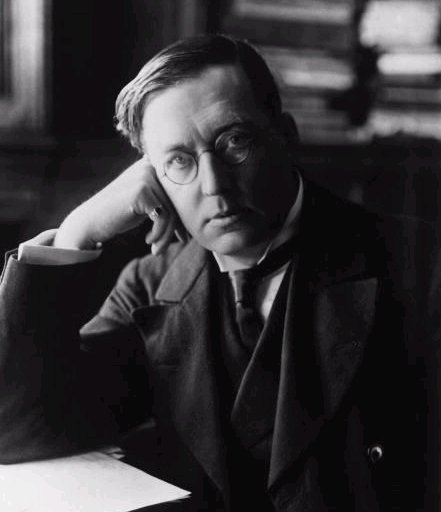
M. R. James, c. 1900

The author and medievalist M. R. James (1862–1936) wrote over 30 ghost stories, which have been widely adapted for television, radio, and theatre. The first adaptation of one of his stories was of A School Story for the BBC Midlands Regional Programme in 1932, the only one produced in James' lifetime. The only notable film adaptation is Night of the Demon (1957), directed by Jacques Tourneur and based on "Casting the Runes", which is considered one of the greatest horror films of all time. The most celebrated adaptations of his works are those produced for British television in the 1960s and 1970s, which have made him, according to critic Jon Dear, "the go-to folk horror writer for television."

== Television ==
There have been numerous television adaptations of James's stories. The very first TV adaptation was American – a 1951 version of "The Tractate Middoth" in the Lights Out series, called "The Lost Will of Dr Rant" and featuring Leslie Nielsen. It is available on several DVDs, including an Alpha Video release alongside Gore Vidal's Climax! adaptation of Doctor Jekyll and Mister Hyde, starring Michael Rennie.

The majority of television adaptations of James's works have been made in Britain. The best-known adaptations include Whistle and I'll Come to You (1968, directed by Jonathan Miller) and A Warning to the Curious (1972; directed by Lawrence Gordon Clark), starring Michael Hordern and Peter Vaughan respectively. The latter was part of an annual BBC series titled A Ghost Story for Christmas, which would ultimately produce five dramatizations of James's stories in the 1970s: The Stalls of Barchester (1971), A Warning to the Curious (1972), Lost Hearts (1973), The Treasure of Abbot Thomas (1974) and The Ash-tree (1975).

Although ITV produced four black-and-white adaptations of James's ghost stories between 1966 and 1968, no surviving copies are known to exist. However, a short preview trailer featuring several scenes from the 1968 adaptation of "Casting the Runes" survived and has been shown at cult film festivals. The trailer is also available on Network DVD's Mystery and Imagination DVD set. "Casting the Runes" was again adapted for television in 1979 as an episode of the ITV Playhouse series with Lawrence Gordon Clark directing and starring Jan Francis as the lead protagonist (a man in previous adaptations). It has been released by Network DVD which also includes a 20-minute adaptation of "Mr Humphreys and His Inheritance" (made in 1976 by Yorkshire Television as part of the Music Scene ITV Schools programme) and A Pleasant Terror, a 1995 ITV documentary about James.

In 1980, the BBC produced a series, aimed at older children, of readings of classic horror stories read by various actors entitled Spine Chillers. This included readings of James's stories "The Mezzotint", "The Diary of Mr Poynter" and "A School Story", all read by Michael Bryant. In December 1986, BBC2 broadcast partially dramatized readings by the actor Robert Powell of "The Mezzotint", "The Ash-Tree", "Wailing Well", "'Oh, Whistle, and I'll Come to You, My Lad'" and "The Rose Garden". In a similar vein, the BBC also produced a short series (M. R. James' Ghost Stories for Christmas) of further readings in 2000, which featured Christopher Lee as James, who (in character) read 30-minute adaptations of "The Stalls of Barchester Cathedral", "The Ash-tree", "Number 13" and "A Warning to the Curious".

The Ghost Story for Christmas strand was revived in December 2005, when BBC Four broadcast a new version of James's story "A View from a Hill", with "Number 13" following in December 2006. These were broadly faithful to the originals and were well received. A new version of Whistle and I'll Come to You, starring John Hurt, was broadcast by BBC Two on Christmas Eve 2010.

Ten of the BBC productions made between 1968 and 2010 (including three episodes of the Christopher Lee readings series) were released on DVD in October 2011 as a five-disc boxed set in Australia by Shock DVD, as The Complete Ghost Stories of M. R. James. A boxed set of the BBC's Ghost Stories For Christmas productions, including all of the M. R. James adaptations, was released in Britain in 2012, and an expanded six-disc set (including Robert Powell's series of readings from 1986, and readings from the BBC's 1980 Spine Chillers series for children) was released in 2013.

A new adaptation of "The Tractate Middoth", the directorial debut of Mark Gatiss, was broadcast on BBC Two on 25 December 2013. Gatiss also presented a new documentary, entitled M. R. James: Ghost Writer, which was screened directly afterwards; it featured scenes from the BBC television adaptations, along with Robert Lloyd Parry of the Nunkie Theatre Company performing as M. R. James himself and reading excerpts from his stories.

On 31 October 2014, the BBC daytime soap opera Doctors presented an adaptation of "'Oh, Whistle, and I'll Come to You, My Lad'" with Dr Al Haskey (played by Ian Midlane) substituted for Professor Parkins. "Whistle..." was written by Jeremy Hylton Davies and directed by Pip Short. The BBC website also produced a behind-the-scenes video of the production.

On Christmas Eve 2019, the BBC broadcast an adaptation of "Martin's Close", written and directed by Mark Gatiss, and starring Peter Capaldi. It became BBC Four's "most watched programme of 2019", with 1.5 million viewers.

In February 2021, the BBC announced another Christmas Gatiss adaptation: "The Mezzotint", now promoted to appear on BBC Two.

On 23 December 2022, continuing with the Gatiss Christmas ghost story adaptations, the BBC showed "Count Magnus" on BBC Two.

== Radio ==
1932 – The first broadcast of an M. R. James story was made on 27 October 1932 (four years before his death) during a Bach piano concert transmitted by the BBC Midlands Regional Programme. During the 20-minute interval, "A School Story" was read "from the studio" by Vincent Curran.

1938 – On 12 March, the BBC's London Regional Programme broadcast an adaptation of "Martin's Close" under the title Madam, Will You Walk? The 40-minute play was written by C. Whitaker-Wilson and produced by John Cheatle. The Radio Times printed the musical notation for the ghostly refrain and noted, "You will have had quite enough of that tune before the play has ended. You will hear it played by a string quartet... you will hear it sung by Judge Jeffries in court (an actual fact); and, worse still, you will hear it floating on a gale of wind, sung by a murdered girl near a lonely inn in a Devonshire village. That also is a fact."

1940 – The BBC broadcast a second version of "Martin's Close" on 4 April, this time as a 25-minute reading by John Gloag for the new Home Service.

1946 – World War II had done nothing to dampen the BBC's enthusiasm for "Martin's Close", and on 13 February, C. Whitaker-Wilson's 1938 script of Madam, Will You Walk? was remounted, this time produced by Noel Iliff. Whitaker-Wilson himself played the part of Judge Jeffreys in a 45-minute production for the BBC Home Service.

The same year, the anthology series Stories Old and New featured David Lloyd James reading a 20-minute version of "Lost Hearts" for the BBC Home Service on 16 September.

1947 – The BBC's Wednesday Matinee strand presented a version of "The Mezzotint", adapted by Ashley Sampson, with Martin Lewis as Dennistoun. The play was produced by John Richmond and transmitted on 21 May as the second half of a double bill, in an "approximate" 25-minute slot on the Home Service.

On 19 November, the fifteenth episode of the CBS radio series Escape was an adaptation of "Casting the Runes", dramatized by Irving Ravetch and John Dunkel.

1949 – "'Oh, Whistle, and I'll Come to You, My Lad'" became the second instalment of the new Man in Black series, arranged for radio by John Keir Cross. George Owen played Professor Parkins, Charles Lefeaux was Colonel Wilson, while Valentine Dyall starred as the eponymous host. The 30-minute play was transmitted on 7 February on the BBC Light Programme and repeated on the Home Service on 6 April.

On 16 June the Home Service broadcast a 15-minute reading of "Rats" performed by Anthony Jacobs.

1950 - On March 11, "Count Magnus" was dramatized for The Hall of Fantasy on the Mutual Broadcasting System, adapted by Richard Thorne and airing under the title "He Who Follows Me". A second production of the same story may have been aired in 1952 under the title "The Steps that Follow Me".

1951 – On 21 April, Saturday Matinee presented a version of "Casting the Runes" for the BBC Home Service. Roger Delgado appeared as Harrington, Derek Birch played Dunning and Australian actor Dodd Mehan starred as Karswell. The play was adapted by Simona Pakenham and produced by Leonarde Chase.

1952 – "The Uncommon Prayer-Book" was dramatised by Michael Gambier-Parry for the regional BBC Home Service West. Broadcast on 24 April, the play was billed as a "ghost story for St. Mark's Eve" ("The prayer books, though repeatedly closed, are always found open at a particular psalm... above the text of this particular psalm is a quite unauthorised rubric 'For the 25th Day of April'".) The 60-minute play was produced by Owen Reed and starred George Holloway as Henry Davidson. It was repeated on 26 November on BBC Home Service Basic as part of the Wednesday Matinee strand.

1954 – On 10 December, BBC Home Service Midland broadcast a version of "A Warning to the Curious", adapted by documentary maker Philip Donnellan.

1957 – The association between M. R. James and the festive period began on Christmas Day 1957 as "Lost Hearts" was read by Hugh Burden on the BBC Third Programme.

1959 – "The Tractate Middoth" was adapted as A Mass of Cobwebs by Brian Batchelor for the BBC's Thirty-Minute Theatre. It was produced by Robin Midgley and starred Peter Howell as William Garrett, with Edgar Norfolk as Eldred. It was first broadcast on the Light Programme on 28 April 1959 and received its first repeat 59 years later on 27 August 2018 on BBC Radio 4 Extra.

1963 – Charles Lefeaux had acted in the 1949 production of "'Oh, Whistle, and I'll Come to You, My Lad'", and fourteen years later he would produce three M. R. James adaptations of his own. The first of these was "The Diary of Mr. Poynter", an entry in the Mystery Playhouse strand for the Home Service. ("My hair! Give me back my hair! Give me back my beautiful brown hair" teased the Radio Times.) The 15-minute play was again adapted by Philip Donnellan and starred Marius Goring as Denton.

Lefeaux's second production was a new version of "Martin's Close", this time adapted by Michael and Mollie Hardwick, again for Mystery Playhouse and the Home Service. The 30-minute piece starred Donald Wolfit as Judge Jeffreys and was transmitted on 20 August 1963. ("What see you in the corner of the Court, that you fix your eyes on it and not on me, your Judge?" teased the Radio Times again.) The play was repeated on BBC Radio 4 Extra on 26 February 2018.

On 18 December 1963, "The Ash Tree" was dramatised for The Black Mass, an American anthology series broadcast on KPFA (Berkeley) and KPFK (Los Angeles). The series was produced by Eric Bauersfeld.

The final installment of Lefeaux's M. R. James trilogy came on Christmas Eve with another version of "'Oh, Whistle, and I'll Come to You, My Lad'". ("Easy enough to whistle – but there's no telling what will answer.") Again adapted by Michael and Mollie Hardwick, and again broadcast on the Home Service, the production is notable for the casting of Michael Hordern as Parkins – a role he would reprise for Jonathan Miller's TV adaptation five years later. The 30-minute play was repeated on BBC Radio 4 Extra on New Year's Day, 2018.

Sound effects for "Martin's Close" and "'Oh, Whistle, and I'll Come to You, My Lad'" were provided by the BBC Radiophonic Workshop, and the original sound-effects reel was preserved in their archive.

1964 – Eric Bauersfeld's The Black Mass broadcast a second M. R. James adaptation, with "An Evening's Entertainment" airing on Hallowe'en Night.

1965 – A supernaturally-themed edition of Story Time aired on the Home Service on 23 March. A number of performers read from "stories in prose and verse", including Scottish ballads and James's "Wailing Well".

1968 – Three years later, Story Time presented five M. R. James stories read by Howieson Culff. The 30-minute episodes were produced by David Davis and broadcast weekly on BBC Radio 4 FM between 20 August and 17 September. Episodes were "The Mezzotint", "The Rose Garden", "The Haunted Dolls' House", "The Uncommon Prayer-Book" and "A Neighbour's Landmark". Selected episodes were repeated as Three Ghost Stories the following year.

1971 – Radio 3's Study on 3 presented a four-part analysis of The Horror Story. The second episode ("Ghosts") was transmitted on 23 December 1971 – the day before the first Ghost Story for Christmas aired on BBC1 – and featured a discussion with Jonathan Miller and a reading of "Lost Hearts" by Bernard Cribbins. The series was repeated the following year.

1974 – On 12 January, the CBS Radio Mystery Theater, hosted by E. G. Marshall, presented the episode "This Will Kill You", which was an updated, loose adaptation of "Casting the Runes".

1975 – Radio 4's Story Time presented a "Ghost Trilogy", broadcast over three consecutive days in December. The second edition, on 23 December, was an abridged version of "Number 13" read by Peter Barkworth.

1977 – Michell Raper was a BBC producer who had already made documentaries about Peter Underwood and the London Ghost Club. On 27 December, he presented a 30-minute talk entitled The Ghosts of M. R. James, which also featured readings by Gerald Cross, Norman Shelley and Kenneth Fortescue from "Wailing Well", "Lost Hearts", "'Oh, Whistle, and I'll Come to You, My Lad'" and "Rats".

1978 – On 2 May, the CBS Radio Mystery Theater presented The Figure in the Moonlight, a loose and uncredited adaptation of "The Mezzotint". In Roy Winsor's script, "The Department of Fine Arts at Wheeler College, New Hampshire, is bequeathed a collection of mostly worthless art: reproductions, some photographs, an engraving or two. Upon closer inspection, one of the items stands out for its clarity and tone: an engraving of a Victorian mansion with a flagstone path and a wide front porch. A mysterious figure seems to appear and disappear from the engraving, as if re-enacting an earlier encounter."

In the UK, the Hallowe'en edition of Radio 4's Forget Tomorrow's Monday ("a Sunday morning miscellany") featured Peter Underwood (president of the Ghost Club) talking "about all things strange, from Alchemy to Zombies", and Peter Cushing, who gave a reading of "Lost Hearts".

1980 – On 19 December, "'Oh, Whistle, and I'll Come to You, My Lad'" became Radio 4's Book at Bedtime. It was read in a 15-minute slot by Robert Trotter.

1981 – On 2 January, BBC Radio 4 broadcast an Afternoon Theatre play called "The Hex", written by Gregory Evans and loosely based on "Casting the Runes", starring Conrad Phillips, Peter Copley, Carole Boyer and Kim Hartman. The play was subsequently transmitted, in translation, in several other countries. The 60-minute play has been repeated regularly on BBC Radio 4 Extra since December 2014.

1982 – Radio 4 transmitted two M. R. James stories in the 15-minute Morning Story slot in 1982. "The Rose Garden" aired on 14 June, and "Rats" followed on 15 November. Both stories were read by Richard Hurndall and the series was produced by Michell "Mitch" Raper.

1983 – Morning Story also produced "The Haunted Doll's House" [sic] on 11 February the following year. The 15-minute tale was read by David Ashford and broadcast on Radio 4 Long Wave only.

1986 – Morning Story transmitted another reading of "Rats" on 9 June on BBC Radio 4. James Aubrey was the storyteller, with Mitch Raper again in the producer's chair. The 15-minute show was repeated on 7 October 2018 on Radio 4 Extra.

1997–98 – After a hiatus of eleven years, M. R. James returned to the British airwaves in 1997. Running nightly from 29 December through to 2 January, The Late Book: Ghost Stories featured readings of five tales: "Canon Alberic's Scrapbook", "Lost Hearts", "A School Story", "The Haunted Dolls' House" and "Rats". The stories were abridged and produced by Paul Kent and read by Benjamin Whitrow. Episodes were repeated regularly on BBC 7 (Later becoming BBC Radio 7) from December 2003, then on Radio 4 Extra from 2011. According to the BBC Genome database, the episodes were originally transmitted in a 30-minute slot; however, these listings may be incomplete, as all subsequent broadcasts have been 15 minutes long.

2000 – Radio 4's Woman's Hour Drama presented The Red Room, a nine-part anthology of ghost stories by various authors, told as part of an overarching story ("At a Christmas party, the young Rebecca West meets a mysterious stranger. Literary passions, among others, are aroused. What does it take to tell a good ghost story? A challenge is proffered, a battle of wits begins, as does a descent into dark imaginings.") The third episode was a version of "Casting the Runes", with Sean Baker as Dunning, while episode five was a dramatisation of "Count Magnus", with Charlie Simpson as Wraxall. The Red Room was dramatised by Robin Brooks and directed by Clive Brill, and the nine 15-minute instalments were broadcast between 18 and 29 December, with several – including the M. R. James adaptations – actually listed as "Ghost stories for Christmas" in the Radio Times.

2006 − On 15 March, Radio 4's Afternoon Play featured The Midnight House by Jonathan Hall, a drama influenced by "The Mezzotint". The play was repeated on Radio 4 on 2 July 2007 and has appeared several times on Radio 4 Extra since December 2015.

2007 − Radio 4 presented more M. R. James adaptations in the form of M.R. James at Christmas, a series of five plays in the Woman's Hour Drama slot. Stories adapted were "'Oh, Whistle, and I'll Come to You, My Lad'" starring Jamie Glover as Professor Parkins, "The Tractate Middoth" with Joseph Mlllson as Garrett and John Rowe as Eldred, "Lost Hearts" with Peter Marinker as Abney, "The Rose Garden" with Anton Lesser as George and Carolyn Pickles as Mary, and "Number 13" with Julian Rhind-Tutt as Dr Anderson. The plays were adapted by Chris Harrald and directed and produced by Gemma Jenkins. Each episode was introduced by Derek Jacobi as James himself. The series ran from Christmas Eve to 28 December, culminating in an original Jamesian drama, A Warning to the Furious. The episodes were released on CD as Spine Chillers by BBC Audio in 2008. They were repeated on BBC 7 in December 2009 and (under the title M. R. James Stories) on Radio 4 Extra in 2011 and 2018.

These plays would be the last M. R. James radio adaptations for some time. Although repeats of older plays continued on BBC 7 and Radio 4 Extra, it would be more than 10 years before any new dramatisations were produced.

2009 − The series Classic Tales of Horror included a reading of "The Mezzotint" delivered by Robin Bailey. The episode was transmitted on BBC Radio 7 on 9 October 2009 and repeated on 20 May the following year.

2011 − Radio 3's Twenty Minutes, an "eclectic arts magazine programme", featured a version of "A Warning to the Curious" on 13 June. The twenty-minute reading was by Alex Jennings, and the script produced and abridged by Justine Willett.

2018 – Woman's Hour Drama had broadcast the last M. R. James dramatisations before the hiatus. The slot was subsequently rebranded as 15-Minute Drama, and in 2018 introduced a new series, The Haunting of M. R. James. "Five of the most powerful tales by this master of the ghost story" were adapted by Neil Brand: "The Mezzotint", "Casting The Runes", "The Stalls of Barchester Cathedral", "A Warning to the Curious and "Rats". As had happened in 2007, the five adaptations were followed by an original drama, this time entitled The Haunting of M.R. James. The series aired daily from 17 to 21 December and was directed by David Hunter.

Also on 21 December, a series apparently entitled Classic Stories: Tales for Christmas was uploaded to BBC Sounds. The episodes included a reading of "The Mezzotint" performed by Sam Dale and produced by Justine Willett. The provenance of this series is something of a mystery as it appears to never have been broadcast prior to its appearance online.

2019 – Another website-only production was added to BBC Sounds on 21 June. The 25-minute reading of "Wailing Well" was performed by Joseph Ayre and produced as part of Classic Stories: Stories for Summer by Julian Wilkinson.

The second radio adaptation of the year arrived in the form of Ghost Stories from Ambridge, a spin-off from The Archers. The second episode, which aired on Radio 4 on New Year's Eve, was a reading of "Lost Hearts" ("on a biting December night, in the darkened attic of Lower Loxley, Jim Lloyd enthrals an assembly of Ambridge residents with three chilling ghost stories from the turn of the last century", teased the BBC webpage.) John Rowe played narrator Jim Lloyd and the 14-minute script was abridged by Jeremy Osborne.

2020 – A full cast, audio adaptation of "'Oh, Whistle, and I'll Come to You, My Lad'" was produced under the title "Whistle" by White Heron Theatre of Nantucket, Massachusetts, and broadcast on Nantucket's NPR affiliate station, WNCK, on October 31, 2020. It was written and directed by Mark Shanahan with original audio production and music by John Gromada. The audio drama bears a contemporary setting and was set on Nantucket Island. Though it deviates from the source material in many aspects, it retains the original's core traits. The cast includes Steve Pacek, Alexandra Kopko, and Catherine Shanahan.

== Other audio productions ==
In the 1980s, a series of four double audio cassettes was released by Argo Records, featuring nineteen unabridged James stories narrated by Michael Hordern. The tapes were titled Ghost Stories (1982), More Ghost Stories (1984), A Warning to the Curious (1985) and No. 13 and Other Ghost Stories (1988). ISIS Audio Books also released two collections of unabridged James stories, this time narrated by Nigel Lambert. These tapes were titled A Warning to the Curious and Other Tales (four audio cassettes, six stories, March 1992) and Ghost Stories of an Antiquary (three audio cassettes, eight stories, December 1992).

In Spring 2007 UK-based Craftsman Audio Books released the first complete set of audio recordings of James's stories on CD, spread across two volumes and read by David Collings. The ghost story author Reggie Oliver acted as consultant on the project.

April 2007 also saw the release of Tales of the Supernatural, Volume One, an audiobook presentation by Fantom Films, featuring the James stories "Lost Hearts" read by Geoffrey Bayldon, "Rats" and "Number 13" by Ian Fairbairn, with Gareth David-Lloyd reading "Casting the Runes" and "There Was a Man Dwelt by a Churchyard". Volume Two was to follow in the summer.

Also in 2007, BBC Audio released Ghost Stories Volume One (including "A View from a Hill", "Rats", "A School Story", "The Ash Tree", and "The Story of a Disappearance and an Appearance") read by Derek Jacobi. Ghost Stories Volume Two followed in 2009 (including "A Warning to the Curious'" "The Stalls of Barchester Cathedral"', "The Mezzotint", and "A Neighbour's Landmark"').

In 2009, podcast 19 Nocturne Boulevard released a dramatization of "A School Story" under the title "Yew Will Know Me", followed by "Lost Hearts" in 2010; both were dramatized by Julie Hoverson.

As of 2010, the audiobooks site LibriVox offers a set of audio readings (available as free downloads) under the collective heading Ghost Stories of an Antiquary.

In 2019, Audible Originals released The Conception of Terror Volume 1, including full-cast audio adaptations of four of James's stories, updated to modern settings and often with additional characters and secondary plots added. Included are "Casting the Runes" (adapted by Stephen Gallagher), "Lost Hearts" (adapted by A. K. Benedict), "The Treasure of Abbot Thomas" (adapted by Jonathan Barnes), and "A View from a Hill" (adapted by Mark Morris).

Beginning in 2019, Shadows at the Door: The Podcast released several adaptations of James' stories, dramatized by Mark Nixon, including "Canon Alberic's Scrapbook" (2020), "Count Magnus" (2025), "Number 13" (2019), and "A Warning to the Curious" (2020); all parts in "Number 13" were performed by David Ault, while the subsequent productions featured a larger cast. Other episodes featured readings of "Rats" (2021, under the title "A Ghost Story for Christmas") and "There Was A Man Dwelt By a Churchyard" (2019) by David Ault.

In 2020, theater company Box Tale Soup released an audio drama of "Casting the Runes" which also incorporated elements of "The Mezzotint", dramatized by Mark Collier.

== Film ==
The only notable film version of James's work to date has been the 1957 British adaptation of "Casting the Runes" by Jacques Tourneur, titled Night of the Demon (known as Curse of the Demon in the US), starring Dana Andrews, Peggy Cummins and Niall MacGinnis. The Brides of Dracula (Terence Fisher, 1960) lifts the padlocked coffin scene from "Count Magnus", while Michele Soavi's 1989 film The Church—featuring a script co-authored by Dario Argento—borrows the motif of the "stone with seven eyes", as well as a few other important details, from "The Treasure of Abbot Thomas".

A new film adaptation of "Casting the Runes" was announced in 2013 by director Joe Dante. It was to be a modernised reimagining of the story, with James's character Dunning portrayed as a celebrity blogger, and Karswell as a successful motivational speaker and self-help guru with connections to the occult. Simon Pegg was attached to star. The film has yet to go into production.

== Stage ==
The first stage version of "Casting the Runes" was performed at the Carriageworks Theatre in Leeds, England, on 9–10 June 2006 by the Pandemonium Theatre Company.

In 2006–2007 Nunkie Theatre Company toured A Pleasing Terror round the UK and Ireland. This one-man show was a retelling of two of James's tales, "Canon Alberic's Scrap-Book" and "The Mezzotint". In October 2007 a sequel, Oh, Whistle ..., comprising "'Oh, Whistle, and I'll Come to You, My Lad'" and "The Ash-tree", began to tour the UK. A third James performance, A Warning to the Curious, comprising the eponymous story and "Lost Hearts", began touring the UK in October 2009. Although Robert Lloyd Parry of Nunkie said in 2009 that the last would probably be his final M. R. James tour, he continued to tour the three productions in subsequent years, and in 2012 he announced a fourth production, Count Magnus (consisting of "Count Magnus" and "Number 13"), to premiere on 28 September of that year.

In the summer of 2011 the Crusade Theatre Company toured a new stage adaptation of "'Oh, Whistle, and I'll Come to You, My Lad'" in England.

In 2020, "The Experiment" was adapted by Philip Franks into a West End theatre play, "The Haunting of Alice Bowles", starring Tamzin Outhwaite.
