= The Haunted Dolls' House =

1923 short story by M.R. James

"The Haunted Doll's House"
- Short story by M.R. James
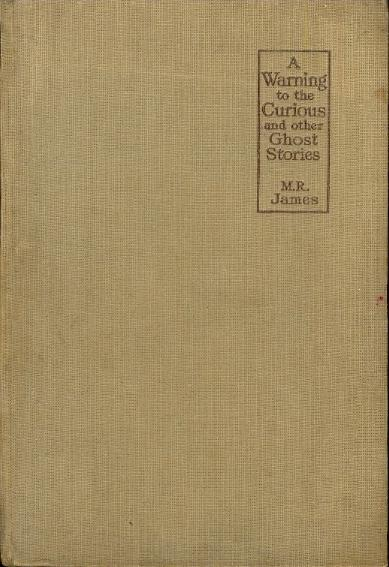
- "The Haunted Dolls' House" was collected in A Warning to the Curious in 1925

Text available at Wikisource
- Country: United Kingdom
- Language: English
- Genre: Horror

Publication
- Published in: The Empire Review and Magazine
- Publication date: February 1923

"The Haunted Doll's House" is a 1923 short story by M. R. James, first published in The Empire Review and Magazine in February 1923.

== Plot summary ==
The story opens in the middle of a conversation between the antique dealer, Mr. Chittenden, and his potential customer Mr. Dillet. They discuss a collector's item in Chittenden's stock and haggle over it; a price is agreed, the sale is made, and Dillet leaves. Chittenden's wife comments how she is glad the thing has gone, and gone to that customer.

Dillet has his purchase carefully driven home then unpacks it and examines it in detail. It is a dollhouse in Strawberry Hill Gothic, six feet long, with many dolls: a middle-aged couple, two children, an old man in bed, and various servants. Dillet retires to bed, but is suddenly woken up by the sound of a bell tolling one o'clock and notices the doll's house, now looking more like a real house in a real landscape, coming to life. The lady of the house visits the old man in his bedroom, where she and a nurse make him drink a posset, upon which he has a fit and dies. A man in black arrives in a coach, bearing papers, but is sent away. There is a second visionary scene in which a coffin stands in the house. The father jokingly frightens the children by pretending to be a ghost. After the children have gone to bed, a man-sized froglike creature enters their darkened bedroom; "it was busy about the truckle-beds, but not for long". Dillet sees the house in commotion, and again hears the clock tolling one. In a final scene, two small coffins are borne out of the house.

Dillet is frightened by these occurrences, and takes a holiday on the east coast, where he again meets Chittenden, recovering from his own experience of the same vision. They agree that the man in black was a lawyer bringing a draft will, and Chittenden says he thinks the dolls' house originated somewhere not very distant, prompting Dillet to investigate. He finds that the Merewether family of nearby Ilbridge House had lost two children in the mid-18th century, and their father was a promising architect, who had made at least one architectural model. Visiting Ilbridge House, he finds that it is in ruins and quite unrecognizable, but notes how the chime of the church clock is startlingly familiar.

== Publication ==
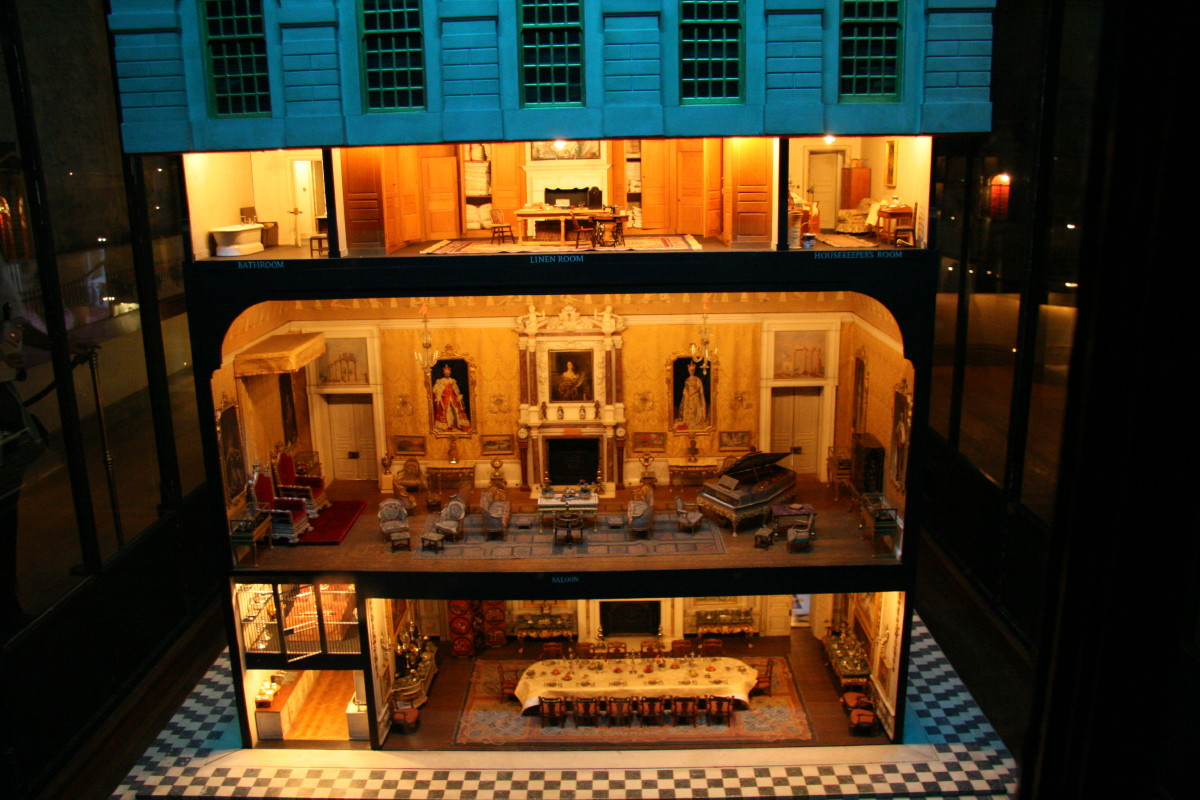
Queen Mary's Dolls' House

"The Haunted Doll's House" was commissioned by Mary of Teck, wife of George V, as a miniature book for her famous Queen Mary's Dolls' House. The Dolls' House, conceived in 1920 and built between 1921 and 1924 for display in Windsor Castle, included a library for which miniature books were commissioned from the leading writers of the day, including Max Beerbohm, Hilaire Belloc, Sir Arthur Conan Doyle, Thomas Hardy and James, at that time Provost of the nearby Eton College. James began a short story in response to this request, writing to a friend on 10 September 1922, "At intervals I try to get on with the Dolls' House story". It was sent four days later to Princess Marie Louise.

Most of the contributors to the Queen Mary's Dolls' House library made over their copyright to the Queen, but James did not, and he went on to place the story in volume XXXVIII of The Empire Review and Magazine, where it appeared in the February 1923 issue. He reprinted it in A Warning to the Curious and Other Ghost Stories (1925) and later in The Collected Ghost Stories of M. R. James (1931). The story has been translated into French (twice), German, Dutch, and Hungarian.

The location of James's original manuscript is unknown, but the tiny dolls' house manuscript copy, just 3.8 centimetres (1.5 in) high, bound by Sangorski & Sutcliffe in full vellum with gold tooling and with a bookplate designed by E. H. Shepard, remains in the Royal Collection (inventory number 1171452).

== Reception ==
"The Haunted Doll's House" is in many ways a typical James story, thematically linked to other works of his, especially "The Mezzotint". Though usually considered a story for adults, it has also been claimed as children's fiction.

=== Themes ===
The idea of a murder being periodically re-enacted by supernatural means was not a new one – it had for example been previously used by Bithia Mary Croker in her 1893 short story "The Dâk Bungalow at Dakor" – but James himself noted in a short afterword to "The Haunted Dolls' House" that his plot is essentially a variation on that of his earlier story "The Mezzotint". In both, as Rosemary Pardoe writes, "the action is observed secondhand by an unconnected witness, and ... the plot concerns supernatural vengeance wrought on innocent offspring for the sins of the parents". In these stories, and in "A View from a Hill", the temporal viewpoint is uncertain: one cannot tell whether the crimes presented are happening in the past or the future, or whether the protagonist can change them. In spite of these similarities Pardoe judges, as does S. T. Joshi, that "The Haunted Dolls' House" and "The Mezzotint" have sufficient variation for each to stand up in its own right. The theme of menace coming from a supernatural artefact was typically Jamesian, reminding one of the whistle in "Oh, Whistle, and I'll Come to You, My Lad", the crown in "A Warning to the Curious", and the gallows wood in "The Stalls of Barchester Cathedral". Julia Briggs has pointed out that beds are especially deadly in this and others of James's stories, and there is also what has been called a "comic Gothicisation of domestic drudgery" apparent in "The Haunted Dolls' House", "Oh, Whistle", "The Diary of Mr Poynter", and "The Malice of Inanimate Objects".

=== Settings ===
The haunting in this story takes place in the countryside, as is true of all of James's works apart from "An Episode of Cathedral History" and "The Stalls of Barchester Cathedral". More particularly, the setting of the story moves to the east coast, which, though James does not specify this, can be confidently narrowed down to the East Anglian coast. This too links "The Haunted Dolls' House" with other James stories, since "The Ash-tree", "The Tractate Middoth", "Rats", "A Vignette", and especially "Oh, Whistle" and "A Warning to the Curious" are East Anglian stories.

== Adaptations ==
On 3 September 1968, a reading of "The Haunted Dolls' House" by Howieson Culff aired on BBC Radio 4 FM's Story Time programme.

On 11 February 1983, a reading of "The Haunted Dolls' House" by David Ashford aired on BBC Radio 4's Morning Story programme.

On 2 January 1998, an abridged version of "The Haunted Dolls' House" by Paul Kent was read Benjamin Whitrow on BBC Radio 4 as part of The Late Book: Ghost Stories.

The story has been adapted as a short film by Stephen Gray.

The story was adapted into a play by Karen Henson, which has been produced by the Rumpus Theatre Company.

The story has been retold online in Toby Litt's "Slice" (part of the We Tell Stories alternate reality game) through the media of blogs, tweets and emails.

The artist Steve Manthorp created a full-size version of James's dolls' house.
