= The Collected Ghost Stories of M. R. James =

1931 book by M. R. James

- First edition
- Author: M. R. James
- Language: English
- Genre: Horror
- Publisher: Edward Arnold
- Publication date: 1931
- Publication place: United Kingdom
- Media type: Print (hardback)
- Preceded by: A Warning to the Curious and Other Ghost Stories

The Collected Ghost Stories of M. R. James is an omnibus collection of ghost stories by English author M. R. James, published in 1931, bringing together all but four of his ghost stories (which had yet to be published).

== Contents of the original edition ==
1. "Canon Alberic's Scrap-Book"
2. "Lost Hearts"
3. "The Mezzotint"
4. "The Ash-tree"
5. "Number 13"
6. "Count Magnus"
7. "'Oh, Whistle, and I'll Come to You, My Lad'"
8. "The Treasure of Abbot Thomas"
9. "A School Story"
10. "The Rose Garden"
11. "The Tractate Middoth"
12. "Casting the Runes"
13. "The Stalls of Barchester Cathedral"
14. "Martin's Close"
15. "Mr. Humphreys and His Inheritance"
16. "The Residence at Whitminster"
17. "The Diary of Mr. Poynter"
18. "An Episode of Cathedral History"
19. "The Story of a Disappearance and an Appearance"
20. "Two Doctors"
21. "The Haunted Dolls' House"
22. "The Uncommon Prayer-Book"
23. "A Neighbour's Landmark"
24. "A View from a Hill"
25. "A Warning to the Curious"
26. "An Evening's Entertainment"
27. "Wailing Well"
28. "There Was a Man Dwelt by a Churchyard"
29. "Rats"
30. "After Dark in the Playing Fields"

The four stories not collected in this volume are:

1. "The Experiment"
2. "The Malice of Inanimate Objects"
3. "A Vignette"
4. "The Fenstanton Witch"

== Reception ==
The 2011 edition, published by Oxford University Press, and edited with an introduction and notes by Darryl Jones, included the 30 original stories plus "The Experiment", "The Malice of Inanimate Objects" and "A Vignette".

Commenting on the 2011 edition of the collection, a starred review from Publishers Weekly stated that James "laid the foundations of the modern ghost story with the 33 well-wrought antiquarian tales collected here...James emphasized atmosphere and mood over shock tactics, but he always insisted that ghosts be malevolent and found very disquieting forms for them to take. Many of these stories are time-tested classics, and this volume, which also includes an informative introduction and notes by Darryl Jones, is indispensable for any fan of supernatural fiction."

== Sources ==
- "M.R. James: free web books, online". Archived from the original on September 30, 2009.
