= After Dark in the Playing Fields =

- Short story by M. R. James
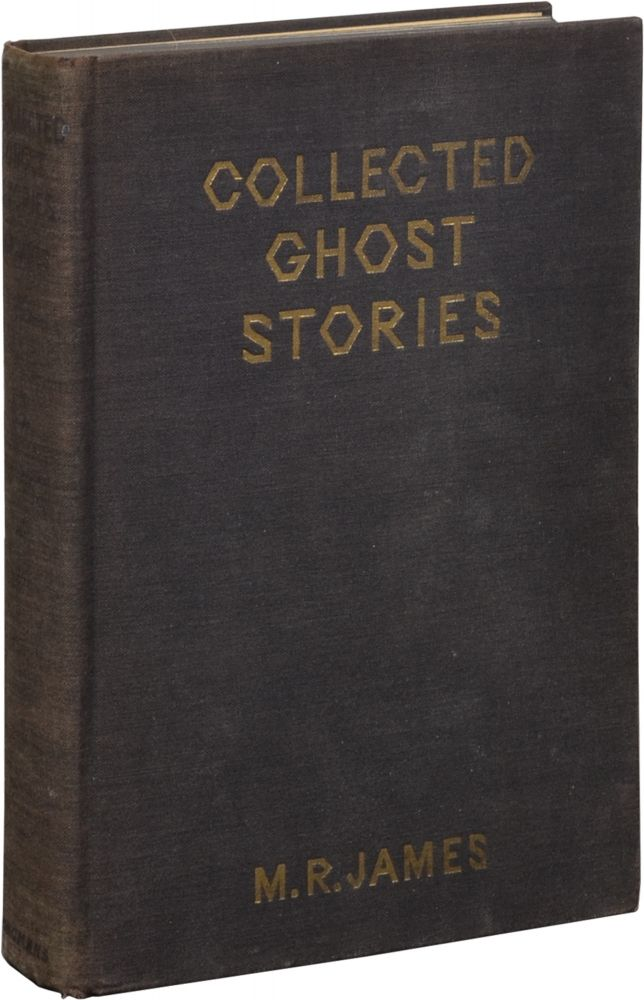
- "After Dark in the Playing Fields" was collected in The Collected Ghost Stories of M. R. James in 1931
- Country: England
- Language: English
- Genre: Ghost story

Publication
- Published in: College Days
- Publisher: Eton College
- Media type: Print, ephemeral
- Publication date: 28 June 1924

"After Dark in the Playing Fields" is a ghost story by the English writer M. R. James, first published in College Days on 28 June 1924.

== Plot summary ==
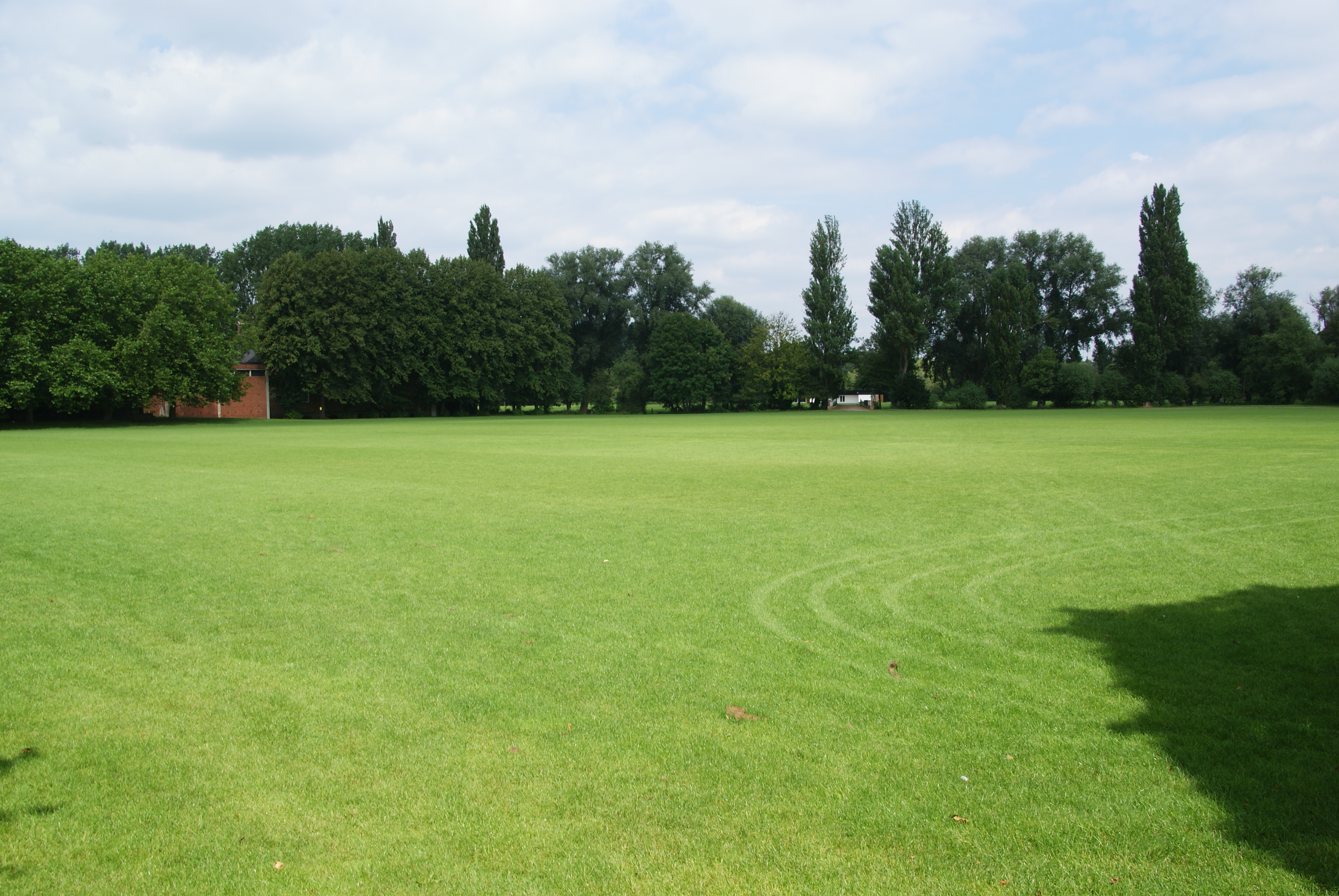
The playing fields of Eton College

The story begins one Midsummer evening with the unnamed narrator having crossed Sheeps' Bridge over the Thames onto the playing fields of Eton College. The narrator is startled by the hoot of an owl; after he points his stick at the owl, he is surprised to hear it talk. As the narrator talks to the surly owl, it screams in pain after an invisible fairy pulls out one of its tail-feathers. After the owl insults the fairies, they bind it with a grass rope and throw it into Fellows' Pond. Upon hearing the bells of Eton College toll midnight, the bedraggled owl - unable to fly - demands that the narrator place it into an elm tree, saying "They'll be coming in another minute". After depositing the owl in the tree, the narrator finds himself reluctant to cross the dark fields, and decides instead to hide in the shadow of the tree.

Reflecting on the experience several years later, the narrator states that he still visits the playing fields at night, but always comes in before midnight. The narrator adds that he does not enjoy seeing crowds after dark, as "...I see—such curious faces [...] looking close into your face, as if they were searching for someone—who may be thankful, I think, if they do not find him." The narrator states that some of the people look like they come "out of the water" and others "out of the ground", but advises that "it is best to take no notice of them, and not to touch them". The narrator closes with the words "I certainly prefer the daylight population of the Playing Fields to that which comes there after dark."

== Publication ==
"After Dark in the Playing Fields" was first published in issue 10 of College Days, an ephemeral magazine published at Eton College (where James was provost), on 28 June 1924. In 1931, it was collected in The Collected Ghost Stories of M. R. James. It has since been included in several anthologies.

== Reception ==
Mick Sinclair describes "After Dark in the Playing Fields" as "slight but curious". E. F. Bleiler describes it as "a mood piece about trees, birds, and the talking owl pursued by a something that may get the narrator, too".

Both S. T. Joshi and Peter Bell note similarities in atmosphere and tone between "After Dark in the Playing Fields" and James' 1922 children's fantasy novel The Five Jars. Similarly, the London Mercury described it as "...almost a meditation, and a pendant to the lovely, fear-touched imaginations of The Five Jars" that "may have in it something of Doctor James' personal belief". Rosemary Pardoe describes it as "a seriously underrated story" that "is more important than it at first seems", describing it as a more sinister "companion tale" to The Five Jars. Similarly, William Atkinson writes that "The invisible population of 'After Dark in the Playing Fields,' although more sinister, is reminiscent of the little people of The Five Jars." Rosemary Pardoe also suggests that "After Dark in the Playing Fields" inspired Ramsey Campbell's 1981 short story "The Burning".

Jane Mainley-Piddock notes "This tale is exceptional in that the narrator is none other than James himself. It is one of only two tales where the Jamesian tactic of narratorial distance is not maintained (the other being 'A Vignette'), which somewhat undermines the theories that many critics (and James) maintained that distance is necessary to maintain plausibility."
