= Tamzin Outhwaite =

English actress and dancer (born 1970)

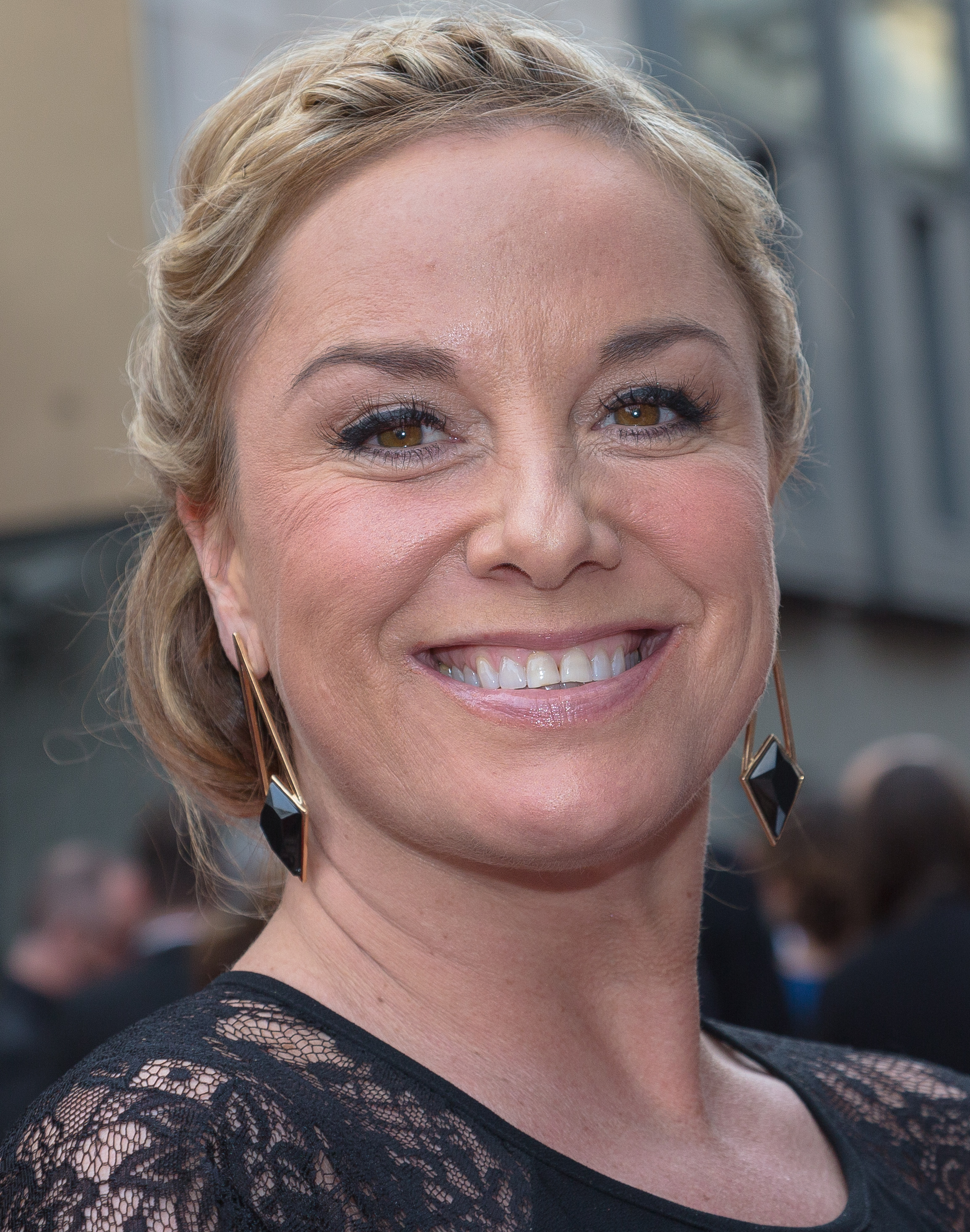
- Outhwaite in 2015
- Born: Tamzin Maria Outhwaite; 5 November 1970 (age 56); Ilford, Greater London, England
- Occupations: Actress; presenter; narrator
- Years active: 1989–present
- Spouse: Tom Ellis (m. 2006; div. 2014)
- Children: 2
- Awards: British Soap Award – Sexiest Female (1999, 2000); National Television Award – Most Popular Newcomer (1999)

Tamzin Maria Outhwaite (/ˈaʊθweɪt/; born 5 November 1970) is an English actress, dancer, presenter and narrator. From 1998 to 2002, and again from 2018 to 2019, she played the role of Mel Owen in the BBC soap opera EastEnders. She has also starred in a number of theatre and television productions, including army series Red Cap and crime drama New Tricks. She also played Rebecca Mitchell in the BBC drama series Hotel Babylon (2006–2009).

== Early life ==
The only daughter of Anna (née Santi) and Colin Frank Outhwaite, born in Ilford, Greater London, Outhwaite has two younger brothers. She was educated at Trinity Catholic High School, Woodford Green. Her mother is of Italian heritage. Her maternal great grandfather and his eldest son were born in Barga, Italy, and became naturalised British citizens in 1957, living first in Glasgow, Scotland, and then settling in Fishburn, England running an ice cream business.

Outhwaite attended the Stagestruck Theatre Company as a teenager, taking part in several productions during the mid-1980s. While at school, she studied part-time at Sylvia Young Theatre School, and on leaving school in 1987, she joined the London Studio Centre to study drama and dance.

== Career ==
=== Early career and EastEnders ===
On graduation from the London Studio Centre she started her career in the theatre, taking roles in productions including Grease and Oliver!, and work at the Stephen Joseph Theatre, before landing bit parts in television series The Bill and Men Behaving Badly.

She found national fame in 1998 when she was cast as Mel Healy in the popular BBC soap opera EastEnders. Her first appearance was aired in October 1998 and her final one was in April 2002. During nearly four years in Walford, Outhwaite's character was central to many storylines. Outhwaite left EastEnders in 2002, shortly after the departure from the soap of co-star Martin Kemp, who had played her on-screen husband Steve Owen.

She stated in 2006 that she would not rule out returning to EastEnders and her return was confirmed on 24 October 2017. Outhwaite departed the soap for a second and final time in November 2019, when Mel was killed off.

=== Further work ===
In 2007, Outhwaite appeared in a revival of Boeing Boeing at the Comedy Theatre, as well as the film Cassandra's Dream, which first premiered in June. In March 2008, she had a role in the ITV drama series The Fixer. In 2009, she played the lead in the sci-fi crime series for the BBC entitled Paradox, which first aired on BBC One on 24 November 2009. In 2010, she appeared in Over the Rainbow, a talent show casting for Andrew Lloyd Webber's stage production of The Wizard of Oz. That same year, she was a member of the judging panel on the UK television programme Don't Stop Believing broadcast on Channel 5.

In July 2013, Outhwaite joined the cast of the popular BBC One comedy-drama series New Tricks as DCI Sasha Miller, replacing Amanda Redman as head of the team in the show. Outhwaite had earlier appeared in series 9, episode 6 of the show, guest-starring as a different character who is brought to justice at the end of the episode. In March 2016, Outhwaite was cast to play Teresa Phillips in a revival of Alan Ayckbourn's How the Other Half Loves at the Theatre Royal Haymarket. Outhwaite has done introductory segments of true crime episodes of NBC's Dateline for British television audiences. In May 2020, Outhwaite played Indie Hendricks in Dun Breedin, a project by Julie Graham about women who are going through the menopause during lockdown due to the COVID-19 pandemic. Because of this, her scenes were filmed at her own house. The episodes were uploaded to YouTube weekly.

In 2020, Outhwaite starred in Philip Franks' West End theatre play "The Haunting of Alice Bowles" (an adaptation of M. R. James' short story "The Experiment"). In 2021, Outhwaite appeared on The Masked Dancer, masked as Scarecrow. She was unmasked in the final and finished in fourth place.

== Personal life ==
Outhwaite resides in north London. From 2006 to 2014, she was married to Welsh actor Tom Ellis, with whom she has a son and daughter. In 2013 the pair separated and Outhwaite had filed for divorce which was finalised in April 2014.

Outhwaite is cousin to Holly Willoughby's husband, Dan Baldwin.

Outhwaite acts as an ambassador for the Park Theatre in the Finsbury Park area of London.

In 2026, Outhwaite revealed that she had previously undergone a non-surgical facelift using a course of NeoGen nitrogen plasma treatments.

== Filmography ==
Film
Year	Title	Role	Notes
1996	Princess in love	Maid	
2002	Out of Control	Shelley Richards	
2004	When I'm 64	Caz	
2005	7 Seconds	Sgt. Kelly Anders	
2006	Backwaters	Lili Taylor	
2007	Cassandra's Dream	Emma	
2008	Radio Cape Cod	Jill Waters	
2011	Fast Freddie, The Widow and Me	Patsy Morgan	
2012	Great Expectations	Molly	
2020	What a Carve Up!	The Journalist	
2020	The Haunting of Alice Bowles	Alice Bowles	
2021	Bull	Sharon	
2023	Sumotherhood	Ambulance Worker	Cameo

Television
Year	Title	Role	Notes
1993	The Mystery of Dr Martinu	Girlfriend	Television film
1995	Men Behaving Badly	Girl in Pub	1 episode (season 4 episode 23)
1996	The Bill	Liz Crane	Episode: "Hers"
1998–2002, 2018–2019	EastEnders	Mel Owen	Regular role; 617 episodes
2000	Da Ali G Show	Melanie	Episode: "Gail Porter"
2003	Final Demand	Natalie Taylor	Television film
2003–2004	Red Cap	Sgt. Jo McDonagh	Main role
2004	Hustle	Katherine Winterborn	Episode: "A Touch of Class"
2004	Frances Tuesday	Frances West	Television film
2005	Walk Away and I Stumble	Claire Holmes	Television film
2006	Vital Signs	Rhoda Bradley	Main role
2006–2007	Hotel Babylon	Rebecca Mitchell	Main role (series 1–2)
2007	The Catherine Tate Show	Shelley	2007 Christmas special
2008–2009	The Fixer	Rose Chamberlain	Main role
2009	Paradox	D.I. Rebecca Flint	TV mini-series
2011	Law & Order: UK	Miriam Pescatore	Episode: "Immune"
2012	Silent Witness	Beth Gilston	Episodes: "Fear: Parts 1 & 2"
2012	New Tricks	Victoria Kemp	Episode: "Love Means Nothing in Tennis"
2013	Foyle's War	Brenda Stevens	Episode: "Sunflower"
2013	Doctor Who	Captain Alice Ferrin	Episode: "Nightmare in Silver"
2013	Agatha Christie's Marple	Mrs. Rogers	Episode: "Endless Night"
2013–2015	New Tricks	DCI Sasha Miller	Main role (series 10–12)
2016	Josh	Valerie	Episode: "Bed & Breakfast"
2017	Inside No. 9	Connie	Episode: "Empty Orchestra"
2017	Murdoch Mysteries	Penelope Marsh	Episode: "Up from Ashes"
2018	Midsomer Murders	Samantha Adler	Episode: "The Lions of Causton"
2020	Shakespeare & Hathaway: Private Investigators	Jessica Duke	Episode: "Teach Me, Dear Creature"
2021	Ridley Road	Barbara Watson	All 4 episodes
2022	Death in Paradise	Holly Faircroft	Episode: #11.2
2022	We Hunt Together	Shannon McBride	2 episodes
2022	Murder, They Hope	Diana	Episode: "Can't See The Blood For The Trees"
2023	The Tower	Cathy Teel	Series two
2023	Murder is Easy	Mrs Pierce	2 episodes
2024	The Wives	Sylvia Morgan	6 episodes
2025	Murder Before Evensong	Stella Harper	All episodes
2025	Silent Witness	Sally Alden	Episodes: "Broken: Parts 1 & 2"
2026	Benidorm Is Murder	Tiff (Dennis's wife)	

== Awards and nominations ==
Year	Award	Category	Work	Result	Ref.
1999	The British Soap Awards	Sexiest Female	EastEnders	Won	
1999	5th National Television Awards	Most Popular Newcomer	EastEnders	Won	
2000	The British Soap Awards	Sexiest Female	EastEnders	Won	
2000	6th National Television Awards	Most Popular Actress	EastEnders	Nominated	
2001	The British Soap Awards	Sexiest Female	EastEnders	Won	
2001	Maxim Awards	Woman of the Year	Herself	Won	
2002	The British Soap Awards	Best Actress	EastEnders	Nominated	
2002	The British Soap Awards	Sexiest Female	EastEnders	Nominated	
2003	9th National Television Awards	Most Popular Actress	Red Cap	Nominated	
2006	12th National Television Awards	Most Popular Actress	Hotel Babylon	Nominated	
2011	WhatsOnStage Awards	Best Actress in a Musical	Sweet Charity	Nominated	
2012	What's on TV	Soap's Greatest Legend	Eastenders	Nominated	
2015	20th National Television Awards	Drama Performance	New Tricks	Nominated	
2015	TV Choice Awards	Best Actress	New Tricks	Nominated	
2018	TV Choice Awards	Best Soap Actress	EastEnders	Nominated	
2019	The British Soap Awards	Best Actress	EastEnders	Nominated	
2019	Inside Soap Awards	Best Bad Girl	EastEnders	Nominated	
2019	Digital Spy Reader Awards	Best Soap Actor (Female)	EastEnders	Fifth	
2024	Romford Film Festival	Best Actress		Nominated	
