= We Tell Stories =

We Tell Stories is an alternate reality game launched in March 2008 by Six to Start in conjunction with Penguin publishers. Six authors have contributed stories to the project, one each week, which are displayed on the site using interactive internet media. Penguin are offering a prize of 1300 books to readers who can answer a series of questions based on the stories.

The site received nearly 50,000 unique visitors in its first week. In March 2009, at the SXSW Web Awards, We Tell Stories won the Award in the experimentation category and the overall Best of Show Award.

== The six stories ==
Each of the six stories is inspired by a Penguin classic novel.

1. Charles Cumming, "The 21 Steps"; based on The 39 Steps by John Buchan
  In this fast-paced thriller readers follow the protagonist, Rick, on his journeys by the medium of Google Maps.
2. Toby Litt, "Slice"; based on The Haunted Dolls' House by M R James
  A troubled American girl is brought to London by her parents to make a fresh start. The story unfolds through Livejournal, WordPress and Twitter accounts.
3. Kevin Brooks, "Fairy Tales"; based on Fairy Tales by Hans Christian Andersen
  This interactive story allows readers to input information and make "choose your own adventure" selections to create their own personalised fairy tale.
4. Nicci French, "Your Place and Mine"; based on Thérèse Raquin by Émile Zola
  A story about two people, Terry and Laurence, that was typed in real time, from 7 to 11 April 2008. During this time readers observed the trains of thought of the two as their relationship changed, and saw how their opinions of the situation differed. In the end Laurence ends the relationship, though both sides believe it to be for different reasons.
5. A story written by Matt Mason and designed by Nicholas Felton; based on Hard Times by Charles Dickens
6. Mohsin Hamid, the (Former) General in his Labyrinth; based on Tales from the Thousand and One Nights
