= When I'm 64 (film) =

- Genre: Drama
- Written by: Tony Grounds
- Directed by: Jon Jones
- Starring: Alun Armstrong; Paul Freeman; Tamzin Outhwaite; Jason Flemyng
- Country of origin: United Kingdom
- Original language: English

Production
- Producer: Pier Wilkie
- Running time: 90 minutes

Original release
- Network: BBC Two
- Release: 4 August 2004

When I'm 64 is a television film about two older men from different backgrounds who first become friends and then lovers. It was broadcast on BBC Two on 4 August 2004, and was also screened at several LGBT film festivals in 2005 and 2006.

== Plot ==
Jim (Alun Armstrong) is a Latin teacher who is retiring after a long career at the same public school he attended as a boy. He has led a sheltered and lonely life and is determined to see the world and fall in love. His plans are delayed when his father (David Morris) has a stroke.

The cab that picks Jim up from school is driven by Ray (Paul Freeman), a widower whose grown children, Caz (Tamzin Outhwaite) and Little Ray (Jason Flemyng), use him as an unpaid babysitter for their kids. Ray also feels lonely and unfulfilled, and the terminal illness of his friend Billy (Karl Johnson) has made him face his own mortality. He is inspired to take charge of his own life after learning of Jim's plans.

Despite their different backgrounds, shy academic Jim and former football hooligan Ray become friends. Although Jim is sexually inexperienced and Ray has lived a lifetime as a heterosexual, their friendship eventually develops into a romantic relationship. The situation is further complicated by the reactions of Ray's children.

== Background and production ==
The film was made as part of BBC Two's The Time of Your Life season, which featured programs focusing on people over 50. Writer Tony Grounds explained: "When I was asked to do something about this age group, I wanted to do something different. I didn't want to talk about pensions and bus passes." Executive producer Jessica Pope said: "The underlying theme that you're never too old to make changes in your life is universal. Jim and Ray take a course they couldn't contemplate in their youth, but they grasp the opposite now. They don't bow to others' expectations about how old men should behave."

Actor Alun Armstrong said he had some reservations about filming the love scene between Jim and Ray "because the taboos are so ingrained in us... But when I read the script I thought, 'It's a lovely story. It's such a good idea, with great twists in it and, all right, so they turn out to be gay.'"

The title of the film alludes to the Beatles song "When I'm Sixty-Four" although Armstrong’s character retires at age 65 in the film.

== Broadcast, distribution and reception ==
Airing on 4 August 2004, When I'm 64 had 3.17 million viewers. It was the second-highest-rated program of the week on BBC Two, though all the top 30 programmes on BBC One had higher viewing figures. It won the Prix Europa for Television Programme of the Year 2005 – TV Fiction.

The Independent observed When I'm 64 challenged TV conventions by depicting older people in a sexual relationship, while Nancy Banks-Smith of The Guardian found it "touching" and said the dialogue was "strikingly true to life." Dan Odenwald of Metro Weekly wrote: "When I'm 64 is richer and more subtle than most romances. The age and experience of the couple allow director Jon Jones to offer a deeper, more layered narrative."

The film was subsequently shown at various LGBT film festivals including the Frameline Film Festival in San Francisco in June 2005; the Reel Affirmations film festival in Washington, D.C., in October 2005; the Chicago International Gay and Lesbian Film Festival in November 2005; the Vues d'en Face festival in Grenoble, France, in April 2006; and the Out Takes film festival in New Zealand in June 2006. At the Philadelphia International Gay & Lesbian Film Festival in July 2005, it won the jury prize for best feature in the gay male category, and at the Out Takes Dallas film festival in November 2005, the film won the award for best feature and Alun Armstrong was awarded best lead actor in a feature.

When I'm 64 has not been released on DVD.
