= David Morris (actor) =

English painter and actor (1924-2007)

- Born: 11 September 1924; Folkestone, Kent, England
- Died: 29 October 2007 (aged 83); Watford, Hertfordshire, England
- Education: Magdalen College, Oxford
- Occupations: Painter, actor
- Spouse: Olwen Goodwin (m. 1957)
- Children: 4

David Cedric Morris (11 September 1924 – 29 October 2007) was an English painter and actor, perhaps best known for his role as Grandpa George in Charlie and the Chocolate Factory (2005). He made his debut as a professional actor at age 79.

== Life and career ==
Morris was born in Folkestone, Kent. He won a choral scholarship to Magdalen College School, Oxford, at age nine. Morris went on to read English at Magdalen College at the University of Oxford. His tutor was C. S. Lewis.

During World War II, Morris' brother was killed in North Africa. That and his own experiences serving in the war led Morris to become a peace activist. He later became an active member of the Campaign for Nuclear Disarmament and helped organize the first Artists for Peace exhibition in the 1980s.

After the war, Morris decided to become an artist, and he studied at the École des Beaux-Arts. Some of Morris' portraits and landscapes were exhibited by the Royal Society of Portrait Painters and the Royal Academy, and two of his murals depicting Christ in Bible stories in views from Waterloo Bridge were displayed at St. John's Church, Waterloo Road, London until the 2022 redevelopment of that church. It is not known where they are now stored or displayed. Morris taught art for 20 years in the Royal Academy Schools and lectured at various other schools in London, Oxford and Brighton.

Morris was an amateur actor who staged Shakespeare productions in a converted barn called the "Bottom Theatre" at his home in Roughwood, Buckinghamshire. In 2004, Morris was recommended for a role in the TV mystery series Jonathan Creek by his friend, director Sandy Johnson. Morris went on to appear in the TV film When I'm 64 and the comedy series Little Britain and Saxondale. In 2005, he played Grandpa George in Tim Burton's Charlie and the Chocolate Factory.

Morris married Olwen Goodwin, a pianist, in 1957 and they had four children: Sarah, Martin, Stephen and Anna. Morris died on 29 October 2007 from a heart attack, at age 83.

== Filmography ==
Year	Title	Role	Notes
2004	Jonathan Creek	Leo Laughton-Jones	Series 4, Episode 6: "Gorgons Wood"
2004	When I'm 64	George	TV film
2004	Little Britain	Welsh postman	Series 2, Episode 1; Series 2, Episode 6
2005	Charlie and the Chocolate Factory	Grandpa George	
2005	A Very Social Secretary		
2005	Saxondale	Old Interviewee	Series 1, Episode 1
2007	Flick	Father Carmichael	(final film role)
