= The Uncommon Prayer-Book =

- Short story by M. R. James
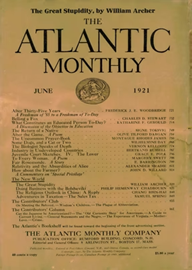
- "The Uncommon Prayer-Book" was first published in The Atlantic Monthly in June 1921.

Text available at Wikisource
- Country: England
- Language: English
- Genre: Ghost story

Publication
- Published in: The Atlantic Monthly
- Media type: Print, magazine
- Publication date: June 1921

"The Uncommon Prayer-Book" is a ghost story by the English writer M. R. James, first published in The Atlantic Monthly in June 1921, and collected in James' books A Warning to the Curious and Other Ghost Stories (1925) and The Collected Ghost Stories of M. R. James (1931). The story concerns supernatural activities surrounding unusual editions of the Book of Common Prayer commissioned by Anne Sadleir. It was adapted for radio by BBC Home Service West in 1952 and by BBC Radio 4 FM in 1968.

== Plot summary ==
The narrator, Mr. Davidson, is holidaying alone one January in Longbridge in the Tent valley. (Note: Speculated by Michael Cox to be based on the Teme valley.) While on a train journey to Kingsbourne Junction, from where he plans to walk back to Longbridge, Davidson meets an elderly man, Mr. Avery, who is travelling to visit his daughter, Mrs. Porter, who is the wife of the gamekeeper of Brockstone Court. Avery offers to arrange for Davidson to see the interior of Brockstone Court and the disused Brockstone Chapel. While touring Brockstone Court, Davidson sees a painting titled "Triumph of Loyalty and Defeat of Sedition", which depicts Oliver Cromwell and other Roundheads being tormented. Avery explains that the painting was commissioned by Anne Sadleir, who is said to have been the first person to dance on Cromwell's grave. Sadleir also commissioned Brockstone Chapel.

Davidson is impressed by the Chapel, which is a mid-seventeenth-century building in the Gothic style with a rich interior. Avery and Porter are nonplussed to see that eight copies of the Book of Common Prayer in the chancel are lying open; Porter explains that this has happened many times before despite the Chapel being securely locked. Davidson notes that the prayer-books, which date from 1653, are all standing open at Psalm 109, and that a rubric reading "For the 25th day of April" has been added. Davidson surmises that the prayer-books were printed specially for the Chapel.

After walking back to Longbridge, Davidson reflects that it is unusual that the prayer-books should have been printed in 1653, when the Book of Common Prayer was banned. While dining that evening, Davidson encounters a dealer, Mr. Homberger, who asks if he is aware of any likely spots to find rare books. Davidson, who has taken a dislike to Homberger, omits to mention Brockstone Court. While travelling home the next day, Davidson observes in his almanac that 25th April is Cromwell's birthday. Davidson speculates that Sadleir and others had held a "curious evil service" at Brockstone Chapel, and wonders if "anything exceptional" might happen in the Chapel on 25th April. Carrying out research, Davidson learns of rumours (stemming from letters sent by a person living near Longbridge) about a "special anti-Cromwellian issue" of the Book of Common Prayer having been published during the Commonwealth of England.

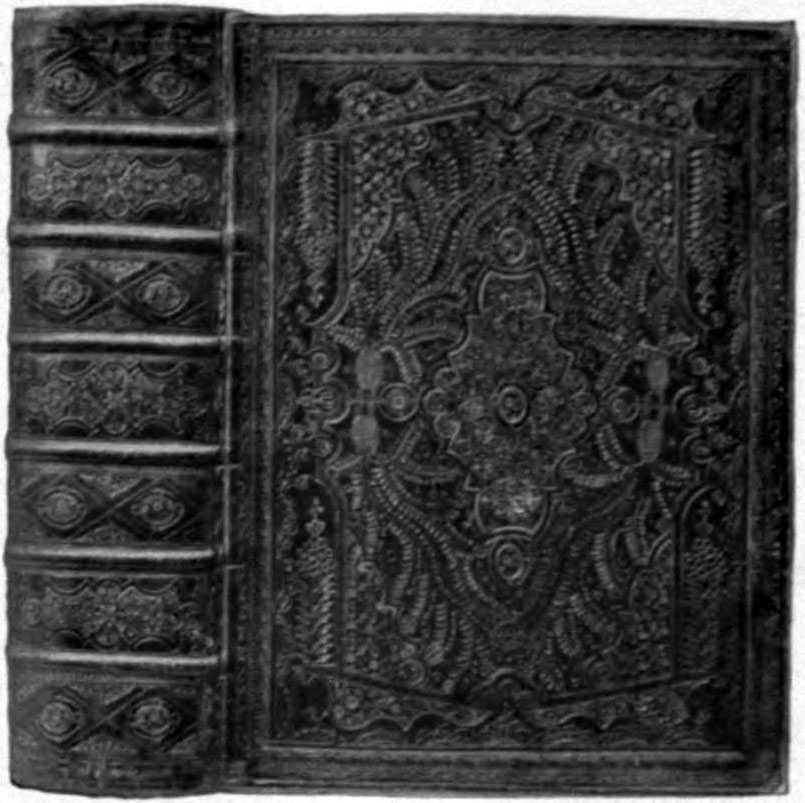
A copy of the Book of Common Prayer from 1678

On 25th April, Davidson and a friend, Mr. Witham, visit Brockstone Chapel, where they find that the prayer-books are unopened. After examining the prayer-books, Davidson finds that the original books have been replaced with substitutes. Porter recounts that a man calling himself Mr. Henderson (who matches the description of Homberger) had visited the Chapel in January, then returned in mid-April and asked to be left alone in the Chapel for an hour to take long-exposure photographs. Davidson surmises that Homberger has stolen the original books and left facsimiles in their place. Davidson and Witham decide to try and catch Homberger in the act of selling the stolen books.

Also on 25th April, in London, two police inspectors question a commissionaire and a clerk who are employees of "Mr. Poschwitz". They learn that Poschwitz had returned from a business trip earlier that week feeling unwell. That Saturday morning, the commissionaire saw Poschwitz open a safe in his office, upon which "a great roll of old shabby white flannel, about four to five feet high [with] a kind of a face in the upper end of it" and eyes like "two big spiders' bodies" fell out of the safe and landed on Poschwitz, with its "face" burying into his neck "like a ferret going for a rabbit". The commissionaire summons the police, who find Poschwitz dead with a wound to his neck; they speculate that he died from a snakebite. Examining the safe, they find a mound of dust and a photographer's box filled with prayer-books. The prayer-books are returned to the owners of Brockstone Hall, who decide to keep them in a safe deposit box in London rather than returning them to Brockstone Chapel, and the facts in Poschwitz's death are suppressed.

== Publication ==
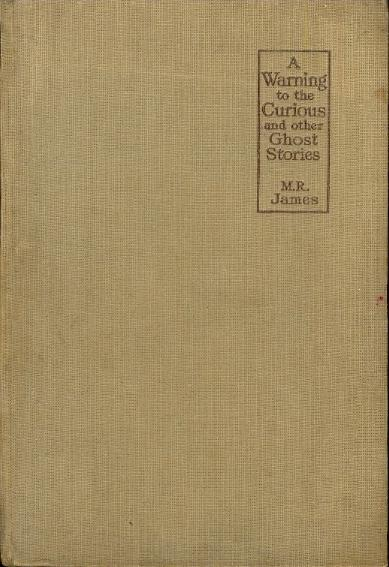
"The Uncommon Prayer-Book" was collected in James' book A Warning to the Curious in 1925

"The Uncommon Prayer-Book" was first published in volume 127, number 6 of The Atlantic Monthly in June 1921. In 1925, it was collected in James' book A Warning to the Curious and Other Ghost Stories. It has since been collected many times, including in The Collected Ghost Stories of M. R. James in 1931.

== Reception ==
Richard William Pfaff described "The Uncommon Prayer-Book" as "...one of the most adroitly constructed of all [James'] ghost stories". Arnold Hunt describes it as following a "classic Jamesian formula", and notes that the story "gains added plausibility from a leavening of verifiable historical fact". S. T. Joshi describes it as "a relatively elementary tale of supernatural vengeance".

B. W. Young cites "The Uncommon Prayer-Book" as an example of James' "dislike of the force of secularization" wherein "aspects of his Anglicanism assumed a vigorous, not to say vindictive, form in the sometimes repulsive logic of his fiction".

Tom Brass notes "The Uncommon Prayer-Book" as an example of how, as in James' 1925 work "A Warning to the Curious", "the supernatural is mobilized on behalf of kingship". Similarly, David Punter notes the "manifestations of the supernatural which reflect the power of the old over the new". Jane Mainley-Piddock suggests "...the moral is that the church is well-equipped and ruthless in its deployment of demons to protect its property and derives its authority to be so from its deity's equally jealous protection of the fruits of the trees of knowledge of good, evil and life."

Edward Wagenknecht writes "...while its supernaturalism is violent and unabashed, the reader is invited to concern himself with worldly matters much of the time."

== Adaptations ==
On 24 April 1952, "The Uncommon Prayer-Book" was dramatised by Michael Gambier-Parry for BBC Home Service West. The play was billed as a "ghost story for St Mark's Eve" ("The prayer books, though repeatedly closed, are always found open at a particular psalm [...] above the text of this particular psalm is a quite unauthorised rubric 'For the 25th Day of April'".) The 60-minute play was produced by Owen Reed and starred George Holloway as Henry Davidson. It was repeated on 26 November 1952 on BBC Home Service Basic as part of the Wednesday Matinee strand.

On 10 September 1968, "The Uncommon Prayer-Book" aired on BBC Radio 4 FM as part of its Story Time programme, read by Howieson Culff. It was repeated on 18 April 1969.
