= Wailing Well =

- Short story by M. R. James
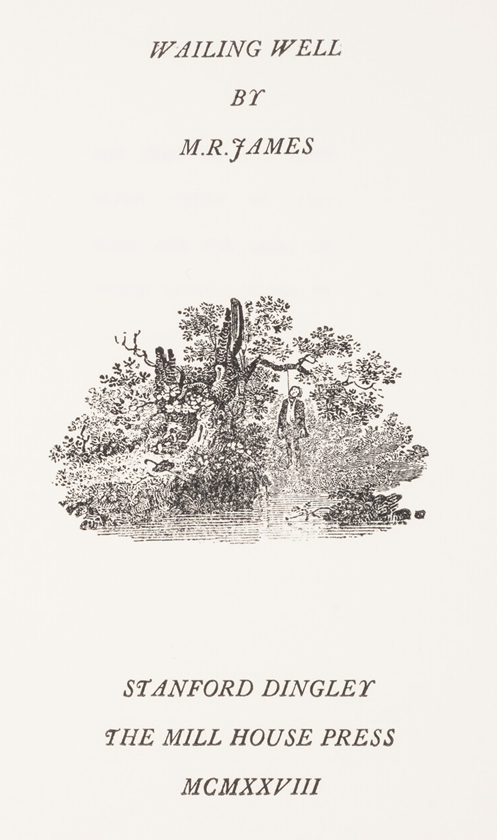
- Country: England
- Language: English
- Genre: Ghost story

Publication
- Publisher: The Mill House Press
- Media type: Print, booklet
- Publication date: 1928

"Wailing Well" is a ghost story by the English writer M. R. James, written in 1927 and first published in 1928 as a standalone volume with a limited print run. In 1931, it was collected in James' book The Collected Ghost Stories of M. R. James. Set in Worbarrow Bay, the story concerns a Scout troop who run afoul of a field haunted by vampiric undead entities. The story has been adapted several times, including radio productions for the BBC Home Service and BBC Radio 4 and a television episode for BBC2.

== Plot summary ==
The story opens by describing two members of a Scout troop attached to "a famous school": (Note: Identified by S. T. Joshi and Rosemary Pardoe as referring to Eton College.) Arthur Wilcox and Stanley Judkins. The boys are alike in age and appearance, but very different in personality. Wilcox wins multiple prizes and distinctions, including being named captain of the school and of the Oppidans, while Stanley Judkins is repeatedly in trouble with the school staff for his unruly behaviour.

In the Midsummer holidays of 19—, the Scout troop is camping in Worbarrow Bay in Dorset. While sitting on a down with two other Scouts, Wilfred Pipsqueak and Algernon de Montmorency, Stanley expresses an interest in a clump of trees in the middle of an overgrown field overlooked by the down, within which four sets of tracks can be seen. Wilfred notes that the field in question is marked with a red ring on their maps, indicating they are not to enter it. A passing shepherd tells them that the clump is called the "Wailin' Well", and that the surrounding field is disused despite being arable land. After Stanley declares he will take water from the well to make tea, the shepherd warns them against entering the field, telling them that is occupied by three women and a man who "was all bad 'uns when they was alive". The shepherd claims that he once saw the four dead people emerge from bushes in the field and slowly creep to the clump; he describes them as "flutterin' rags and whity bones" with visible teeth. The shepherd adds that the name "Wailing Well" originates from sounds that can be heard at dusk on winter evenings. Stanley dismisses the shepherd's warning, speculating that he has a still hidden in the clump. That evening, one of the Scout troop's leaders emphasises that the Scouts should not enter the red-ringed area.

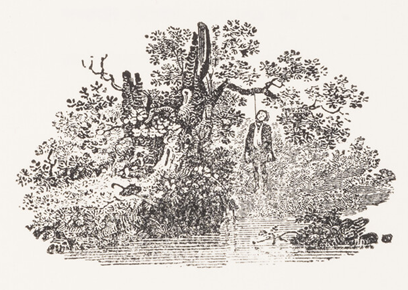
A woodcut from the original edition of "Wailing Well", depicting the fate of Stanley Judkins

The following afternoon, Stanley is found to be missing from the camp. Wilfred suggests he may have gone to the Wailing Well to fetch water. One of the Scout leaders, Mr. Hope Jones, along with Arthur, Algernon, and Wilfred, pursues him. Reaching a down overlooking the field, they see Stanley below, making his way through the field. After Algernon, to his terror, spots a woman crawling along one of the tracks on all fours, Mr. Hope Jones sends Arthur back to the camp to get help and himself descends to the field. Watching from above, Wilfred sees Mr. Hope Jones approach the field, then inexplicably break off at an angle. Looking at the field, he sees a "terrible figure—something in ragged black—with whitish patches breaking out of it" waving its arms towards Mr. Hope Jones, causing the air to "shake and shimmer" and inflicting "waviness and confusion" upon him. Wilfred sees a second figure waiting for Stanley in the clump, a third figure approaching the clump from another side, and a fourth following Stanley from behind. Wilfred and Algernon scream and whistle to warn Stanley, but it is too late; one of the figures seizes him from behind, while another places a rope around his neck. Mr. Hope Jones finally finds his way to the field, but finds only Stanley's body hanging from a branch, entirely drained of blood.

The next day, Mr. Hope Jones returns to the field with the intent of destroying the clump but finds that his axe makes no impression on the trees and he is unable to spark a fire. The story concludes with the narrator stating "I have heard that the present population of the Wailing Well field consists of three women, a man, and a boy."

== Publication ==
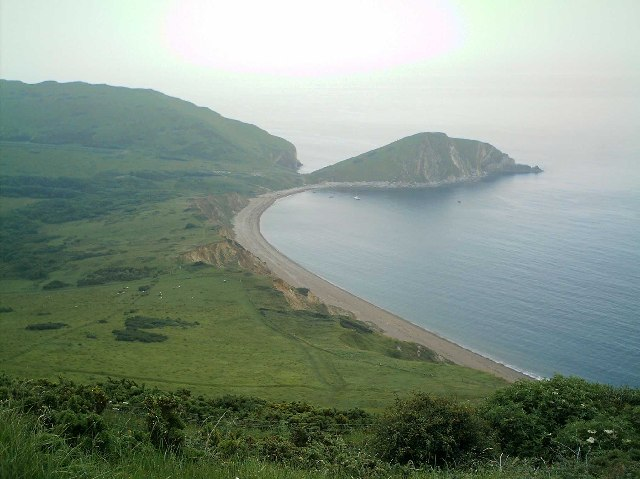
Worbarrow Bay

"Wailing Well" was originally written as a story for the Eton Boy Scouts, with James visiting them during a summer camp at Worbarrow Bay in July 1927 to read the story aloud by the campfire. Mark A. Fabrizi describes "Wailing Well" as "intended to be read aloud". It was first published as a standalone booklet in 1928, with a limited print run of 157 copies. In 1931, it was collected in James' book The Collected Ghost Stories of M. R. James. It has since been included in many anthologies, including collections of vampire fiction.

== Reception ==
Richard Bleiler describes "Wailing Well" as "[James] at his lightest, poking fun at school customs and student behaviour and misbehaviour before establishing a supernatural comeuppance". Christopher Roden observes that "James tempers his horrors with much humour". S. T. Joshi describes the story as "perhaps the most effective of the tales not included in [James'] four ghost story collections, containing rich characterisation of the schoolboy protagonists and a dark humour that underscores the grim horror of the scenario." Rosemary Pardoe states that the story "includes some excellent Jamesian chills and black humour". Hannah Smith describes it as "the most gruesome, and one of the most funny, of [James'] tales." Writing for The Spectator, Ettie Neil-Gallacher briefly describes "Wailing Well" as a "clunky howler". Charles Keeping describes it as "a little gem".

Jane Mainley-Piddock writes "The killing of the protagonist Stanley Judkins is redolent of a primal sex scene; his eviscerated corpse is hung from a tree, after the three female vampires have gorged themselves on his blood" and suggests that "Wailing Well" symbolises "James' desire to distance himself from women [...] as though if the temptation to give into the sexual urge is followed then the ending would be as an eviscerated corpse drained of life force, like Stanley Judkins". Mainley-Piddock notes that the selection of one male vampire and three female vampires parallels Dracula.

== Adaptations ==
On 23 March 1965, a supernaturally-themed edition of Story Time aired on the BBC Home Service. A number of performers read from "stories in prose and verse", including Scottish ballads and "Wailing Well".

On 27 December 1977, BBC producer Michell Raper presented a 30-minute talk entitled The Ghosts of M. R. James on BBC Radio 4, which featured a reading from "Wailing Well".

On 29 December 1986, BBC2 broadcast a partially dramatized reading of "Wailing Well" by the actor Robert Powell as part of its Classic Ghost Stories programme. A review by Mondo-Digital.com states "Featuring one of James's grisliest endings, this one would probably prove difficult to adapt in a more cinematic method but makes for one heck of a storytelling experience."

In 2010, a short film adaptation titled The Wailing Well directed by David Lilley and Stephen Gray was released.

On 21 June 2019, a 25-minute reading of "Wailing Well" performed by Joseph Ayre and produced as part of Classic Stories: Stories for Summer by Julian Wilkinson was added to the BBC Sounds website.
