= Mark Nixon =

Mark Nixon may refer to:

- Mark Nixon (rugby league) (born 1968), New Zealand rugby league footballer
- Mark Nixon (academic) (born 1958), British academic
