= Mark Morris =

Mark or Marc Morris may refer to:

== Arts and entertainment ==
- Mark Morris (author) (born 1963), English author
- Mark Morris (choreographer) (born 1956), American dancer and choreographer
- Mark Morris (cinematographer), known for his work on several films by Andy Sidaris, including Do or Die
- Marc Morris (producer), producer, writer
- Marc Morris (historian) (born 1973), British historian and TV presenter
- Mark Morriss (born 1971), English singer-songwriter

== Sports ==
- Mark Morris (footballer, born 1962), English football player and manager
- Mark Morris (footballer, born 1968), English football player for Wrexham
- Mark Morris (ice hockey) (born 1958), American ice hockey coach

== Other people ==
- Marc Morris (historian) (born 1973), British historian and TV presenter
- Marc Morris (politician), member of the Georgia House of Representatives
- Mark R. Morris (born 1957), American astrophysicist

== Other ==
- Mark Morris High School, a high school in Longview, Washington

== See also ==
- Marcus Morris Sr. (born 1989), American basketball player
- Marcus Morris (publisher) (1915–1989) English publisher and Anglican priest
- Markieff Morris (born 1989), American basketball player
