= There Was a Man Dwelt by a Churchyard =

"There Was A Man Dwelt By a Churchyard"
- Short story by M. R. James
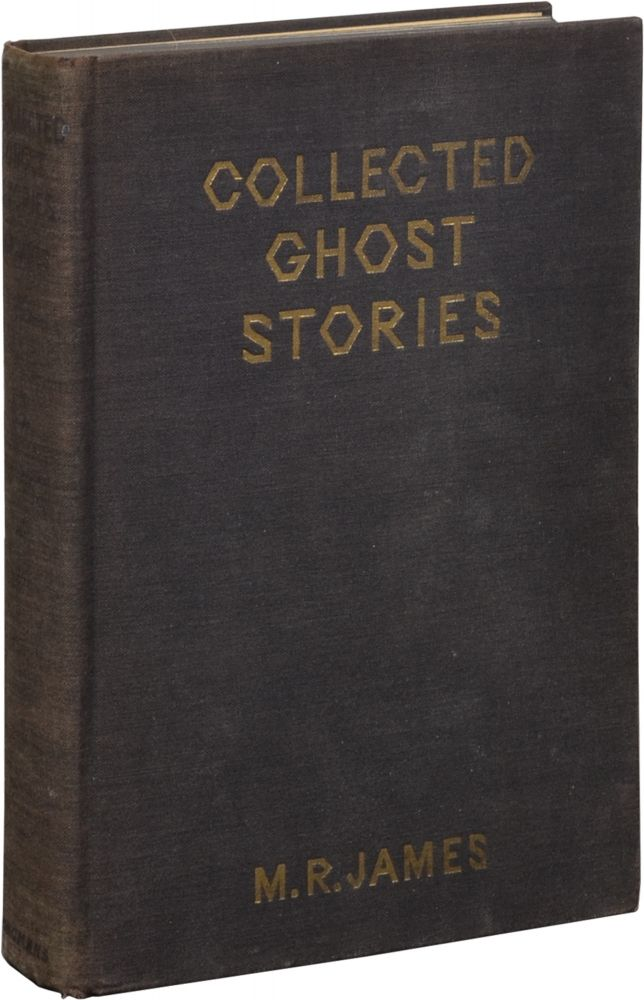
- "There Was a Man Dwelt by a Churchyard" was collected in The Collected Ghost Stories of M. R. James in 1931

Text available at Wikisource
- Country: England
- Language: English
- Genre: Ghost story

Publication
- Published in: Snapdragon
- Publisher: Eton College
- Media type: Print, magazine
- Publication date: 6 December 1924

"There Was a Man Dwelt by a Churchyard" is a ghost story by the English writer M. R. James, first published in Snapdragon on 6 December 1924.

== Plot summary ==
The story is presented as the finished version of the "sad tale [of] sprites and goblins" that Prince Mamilius begins to tell Queen Hermione and her court ladies in act two, scene one of the William Shakespeare play The Winter's Tale.

Set in the Elizabethan era, the story centres on John Poole, an elderly widower who is known as "something of a miser". Poole moves into a house that overlooks his village's churchyard after the former resident, the parish priest, insists on moving after claiming to have seen something in the churchyard at night. When funerals take place in the churchyard at night-time, Poole watches from his window, giving him a reputation of being "morbid".

One night, a wealthy but unpopular elderly women are buried. While not a churchgoer, upon her death, she bequeaths a purse of money to the church. During the funeral, the parson throws "something that clinked" into the grave and says, "Thy money perish with thee". The following day, the churchgoers rebuke the sexton for the untidy work he has made of filling in the grave; the sexton reflects that "he thought it was worse than he had left it".

Poole's nature becomes "half exulting [and] half nervous", and he begins visiting the village inn, where he hints at having come into money and of planning to move to a new house. The blacksmith remarks that he would not want to live next to the churchyard for fear of "somebody climbing up to the chamber window" and asks Poole if he has ever seen lights, which Pool denies.

Returning home late that night, Poole cannot sleep. He takes "something that clinked" out of a cupboard and puts it in his bedgown pocket. Looking out of his window, he sees something that resembles a shrouded figure sticking out of the ground "in a spot of the churchyard which John Poole knew very well". Lying in his bed, Poole hears the casement window rattle, and a figure enters the room. Poole hears earth rattle on the floor, faltering footsteps, and a "low cracked voice" saying "Where is it?". The figure opens the cupboard but finds it empty. The figure then stands next to the bed, raises its arms, and screams hoarsely "You've got it!"

In the framing device, Prince Mamilius then throws himself upon the youngest of the court ladies, causing her to scream. He is punished by Queen Hermione but permitted to remain after the court lady forgives him. Later, upon bidding them goodnight, Mamilius remarks that he "knew another story quite three times as dreadful as that one, and would tell it on the first opportunity that offered".

== Publication ==
"There Was a Man Dwelt by a Churchyard" was first published in Snapdragon, an Eton College magazine, on 6 December 1924. It was inspired by the story that Mamilius begins to tell Hermione in act 2, scene 1 of the William Shakespeare play The Winter's Tale, which James considered "...justified all ghost stories and put them in their rightful place- a tradition of storytelling at winter-time". In 1931, it was collected in The Collected Ghost Stories of M. R. James. It has since been included in several anthologies.

== Reception ==
R. Boerem offers "There Was A Man Dwelt By a Churchyard" as an example of James being "...a writer who wishes to let the reader feel a semblance of truth in the stories without forgetting that they are stories". Darrell Schweitzer describes the story as an example of works by James that are "merely elaborate methods of saying 'Boo!' - of making the reader or hearer jump [with] no philosophical or thematic freight". E. F. Bleiler describes the story as "James's version of an acted out terror tale for children". Rosemary Pardoe states "To call 'There was a Man' a story is really a misnomer, for it scarcely has a plot and is merely a small but mildly amusing joke." Dave Thompson describes it as "...one of the most effective ghost stories ever written".

== Adaptations ==
In April 2007, an audiobook titled Tales of the Supernatural was published by Fantom Films. The audiobook included a reading of "There Was a Man Dwelt by a Churchyard" by Gareth David-Lloyd.
