= The Experiment (short story) =

- Short story by M. R. James
- Country: England
- Language: English
- Genre: Ghost story

Publication
- Published in: The Morning Post
- Media type: Newspaper
- Publication date: 31 December 1931

"The Experiment" is a ghost story by the English writer M. R. James, first published in The Morning Post in 1931. One of James's later works, it concerns a revenant taking revenge for his murder. A play based on "The Experiment", "The Haunting of Alice Bowles", was staged in the West End in 2020.

== Plot summary ==
The story opens one evening in Norfolk with the Reverend Dr. Hall being informed by his housekeeper that Squire Francis Bowles has suddenly died. Dr. Hall visits the widow, Madam Bowles, and the Squire's stepson, Joseph Calvert, who state that the Squire's wishes were to be buried on the north side of the church, without a coffin. (Note: Traditionally, burials on the north side of a church would be reserved for "evil-doers", "nonconformists", and non-members of the Church of England.) The clerk, Wickem, is instructed to have the grave ready for the following night. The Squire's will leaves all his property to Madam Bowles, but no money is found besides a few hundred pounds held by agents. Looking through the Squire's papers, Joseph finds a draft of a letter to Mr. Fowler of Gloucester which reads:

"...for a time after death the soul is under control of certain spirits, as Raphael, and another whom I doubtfully read as Nares; but still so near to this state of life that on prayer to them he may be free to come and disclose matters to the living. Come, indeed, he must, if he be rightly called, the manner of which is set forth in an experiment. But having come, and once opened his mouth, it may chance that his summoner shall see and hear more than of the hid treasure which it is likely he bargained for; since the experiment puts this in the forefront of things to be enquired. But the eftest way is to send you the whole, which herewith I do; copied from a book of recipes which I had of good Bishop Moore."

Joseph writes to Mr. Fowler, who sends him a large package. One evening, Joseph leaves the Hall to carry out a mysterious experiment, taking with him a cloth that was intended to be laid over Squire Bowles' face upon his burial. The following morning, a frightened Joseph obliquely tells his mother of a conversation he has had, saying "Why in God's name did you leave his face bare?", "Oh, but he's angry", "He's free! And I daren't meet him! I daren't take the drink and go where he is! I daren't lie here another night", and "Oh, why did you do it? We could have waited."

Madam Bowles determines that they will sail from Yarmouth to Holland that evening, saying "such as they can't follow". At Yarmouth Quay, Madam Bowles and Joseph are met by a boatman, who mentions that there is one other passenger sailing that night. The boatman states that the passenger is hooded, has "a cur'ous way of speakin'," appears to know them, and is "a-comin' this way now." The story then refers to an entry in the Assize records of Norwich about a woman who confessed to poisoning her husband, and was strangled and then burnt at the stake; her son was hanged.

The story ends with an extract from Bishop Moore's "book of recipes", held in the University Library at Cambridge, reading:

"An experiment most ofte proved true, to find out tresure hidden in the ground, theft, manslaughter, or anie other thynge. Go to the grave of a ded man, and three tymes call hym by his nam at the hed of the grave, and say. Thou, N., N., N., I coniure the, I require the, and I charge the, by thi Christendome that thou takest leave of the Lord Raffael and Nares and then askest leave this night to come and tell me trewlie of the tresure that lyith hid in such a place. Then take of the earth of the grave at the dead bodyes hed and knitt it in a lynnen clothe and put itt under thi right eare and sleape theruppon: and wheresoever thou lyest or slepest, that night he will come and tell thee trewlie in waking or sleping."

== Publication ==
"The Experiment" was first published in The Morning Post on 31 December 1931. It was subtitled "A New Year's Eve Ghost Story". The story was written under both time and space restraints, which James found bothersome. It has since been anthologised many times.

== Reception ==
Rosemary Pardoe describes "The Experiment" as "a minor, weak and difficult tale". S. T. Joshi writes "It is a tale whose denouement is unclear because of the difficulty of interpreting the nature of the creature (Nares) [James] has invented for the tale."

Patrick J. Murphy suggests that "The Experiment" "...gives voice to something more generally harrowing in [James'] temporal position" and that "an intense sense of haste pervades the tale from beginning to end".

== Bishop Moore's book of recipes ==
The "book of recipes" belonging to John Moore, bishop of Ely, featured in the story is genuine, and is held in the special collections of Cambridge University Library (reference MS Dd.11.45, f. 144r); the passage describing the experiment set out in the story appears in the manuscript largely as written. At the time James wrote "The Experiment", he had recently finished re-cataloguing the Library's manuscripts; Rosemary Pardoe suggests "doubtless this particular manuscript struck him as an especially interesting item". When transcribing the instructions for the experiment, James incorrectly transcribed a word as "Raffaell", which he interpreted as "Raphael"; the manuscript in fact reads "Assaell", which is believed to refer to "Azazel". It is unclear where the word "Nares" derives from.

== Adaptations ==
In 2020, "The Experiment" was adapted by Philip Franks into a West End theatre play, "The Haunting of Alice Bowles", starring Tamzin Outhwaite.
