= The Malice of Inanimate Objects =

- Short story by M. R. James
- Country: England
- Language: English
- Genre: Ghost story

Publication
- Published in: The Masquerade
- Publisher: Eton College
- Media type: Print, magazine, ephemeral
- Publication date: June 1933

"The Malice of Inanimate Objects" is a ghost story by the English writer M. R. James, first published in The Masquerade in June 1933.

== Plot summary ==
The story opens with an observation that "in the lives of all of us, short or long, there have been days, dreadful days, on which we have had to acknowledge with gloomy resignation that our world has turned against us". Retelling the tale of "Squire Korbes", the narrator remarks "I know, the fact that Squire Korbes's visitors were not all of them, strictly speaking, inanimate. But are we sure that the perpetrators of this Malice are really inanimate either? There are tales which seem to justify a doubt."

Two men of "mature years", Mr. Manners and Mr. Burton, are sitting in a garden after breakfast. Manners reads in his newspaper that George Wilkins has died by suicide; he speculates that the "row" between Wilkins and Burton may have caused it. Burton angrily responds that Wilkins "...hadn't a leg to stand on: he couldn't bring a scrap of evidence." The two men take a walk, during which Burton suffers various misfortunes, including tripping over a kite string. The kite has been painted with two red eyes, and the letters "I C U" (Note: I.e. "I see you.") are printed in red text. As the two men turn a corner, they hear a muffled, choked voice say "Look out! I'm coming."; Manners initially assumes that the words were uttered by a caged parrot in an open window, but remembers the parrot is taxidermied. Over the remainder of the day, Burton continues to suffer mishaps, including breaking his pipe, tripping on a carpet, and dropping a book in the garden pond.

Burton is forced to cut his visit to Manners short after being summoned back to town. The next morning, he mentions that he plans to visit a doctor, as his hand is so shaky he dared not shave. Burton obtains a private compartment on the train home, but, the narrator notes, "these precautions avail little against the angry dead". Burton is found dead on the train, his throat cut, with a napkin on the chest bearing red letters reading "GEO. W. FECI". (Note: I.e. "I, Geo[rge] W[ilkins], did this.")

The narrator concludes that "there is something not inanimate behind the Malice of Inanimate Objects", that "when this malice begins to show itself we should be very particular to examine and if possible rectify any obliquities in our recent conduct", and that "like Squire Korbes, Mr Burton must have been either a very wicked or a singularly unfortunate man".

== Publication ==
"The Malice of Inanimate Objects" was first published in issue one of The Masquerade, an Eton College ephemeral magazine, in June 1933. The story subsequently fell into obscurity until being rediscovered by Michael Cox while researching for his 1983 book M.R. James: An Informal Portrait. In 1984, it was reprinted in issue six of the magazine Ghosts & Scholars with the permission of James' descendant N. J. R. James. It has since been anthologised several times. The story revisits a concept introduced by James in his November 1929 essay "Stories I Have Tried to Write".

== Reception ==
Jane Mainley-Piddock suggests that "The Malice of Inanimate Objects" depicts an "unstable, alienated world" in which "the invisible agent who torments [Burton]" is used "to illustrate the psychological conditions suffered by the protagonists". Drawing parallels to the character of Septimus Smith in Mrs Dalloway, Mainley-Piddock writes "there is the sense that the character has become increasingly divorced from reality; everything is newly different, and he is locked into a world where even the objects he depended on, like his razor or collar studs, are possessed by forces outside his control."

Penny Fielding writes "the story provocatively fails to establish a connection between the various annoying but trivial objects of Burton's day, including the kite, and the supposed ghost of 'Geo. W. Feci,' who never turns up in person", arguing "this uneasy relationship between objects and their ordering in the cause-and-effect narration of the ghost story characterizes James".

Bob Hodges writes that the title of the story "aptly summarizes [James'] oeuvre".

== See also ==
- Resistentialism
- Squire Korbes
