= A Vignette =

- Short story by M.R. James
- Cover for The London Mercury and Bookman (November 1936)
- Country: England
- Language: English
- Genre: Ghost story

Publication
- Published in: The London Mercury and Bookman
- Media type: Print, magazine
- Publication date: November 1936

"A Vignette" is a ghost story written in 1935 by the British author and academic M. R. James. At just over 2,000 words, it is the shortest of his stories and was the last he wrote. It is an unusually autobiographical story that seems to be based on an incident in James’s early life in Great Livermere when, it is said, he had an experience in a haunted Plantation. "A Vignette" was first published in November 1936 in the literary journal The London Mercury five months after his death.

== Plot summary ==
The story begins with the garden of a country rectory, the childhood home of the narrator, which is next to a large park separated from the Rectory by a strip of ancient trees, about thirty or forty feet in width. This strip of trees is known as the Plantation. Access to the Plantation is obtained through a gate of split oak from a path which circles the garden. For someone to open the gate they must reach through a small square hole in it and lift a hook. On passing through this gate another of iron is encountered which leads to the park.

The narrator describes how as a young boy he had walked home through the park one evening. For part of the way a villager walks with him until the boy reaches the iron gate leading to the Plantation, at which point the villager stops and watches him. By this time it is beginning to get dark. The boy feels that someone is in the woods with him. The person is not known to him and is wearing a hood or cloak. The boy hurries home, ensuring that he shuts the wooden gate behind him. On looking out of his bedroom window he thinks he sees something moving by the wooden gate.

Soon after, the narrator starts to have a recurring nightmare which always begins with himself looking out of his bedroom window and seeing the gardener and his assistants working. As evening approaches they leave as quickly as they can. From his window the narrator searches the now empty garden looking for movement. He notices some by the wooden gate. As he continues to look out of the window the narrator is aware of the sound of footsteps on the stairs behind him and a hand on his door. He wakes up.

He notices that people always walk quickly to get past the wooden gate and seem glad of company as they approach it.

On a bright and sunny afternoon when he is alone in his bedroom he is reading a novel when he reaches a frightening passage in the book. Looking out of the window at the Plantation he notices that the wooden gate is shut and that no-one is on the path beyond it. But he notices that something "white or partly white" can be seen through the small hole in the wooden gate. Wanting to know what this is, the narrator goes down to the gate and looks through the small hole - and sees a face on the other side. While its forehead seems to be fringed with a white shroud, the face is not ghostly or frightening. The face is pink and hot-looking with a blank expression but with large eyes which stare straight at the narrator. Despite the blankness of the face the narrator believes that its owner wishes him harm. In a panic he runs back into his bedroom where, once safely inside, he again looks out of the window - but he can see no sign of the figure in white at the wooden gate. However, he does see a hooded figure shuffling through the trees of the Plantation.

On their return the narrator's parents notice that their young son is upset over something but he manages to avoid telling them about the white figure outside the wooden gate. Even as an adult he remembers the chilling encounter and would still prefer not to walk past the gate to the Plantation.

The story concludes with the narrator considering if such creatures like the one he saw at the gate as a young boy were once a regular sight but are now only seen occasionally at specific locations.

== Background ==
An introduction written by Rolfe Arnold Scott-James, the editor of The London Mercury, when the story was first published in 1936 stated:

"A Vignette" is undoubtedly the last ghost story written by the late Dr. M. R. James, Provost of Eton, and probably his last piece of continuous writing intended for the Press. It came into being in this way. Mr. Owen Hugh Smith was good enough to ask Dr. James to try to recapture the mood in which he wrote Ghost Stories of an Antiquary, and to let me have something in similar rein for the Christmas number of The London Mercury (1935). The answer was that he would do his best. On December 12th of that jear he sent of to me the MS., written in pencil, from The Lodge, Eton College, with the following letter:

'I am ill satisfied with what I enclose. It comes late and is short and ill written. There have been a good many events conspiring to keep it back, besides a growing inability. So pray don't use it unless it has some quality I do not see in it.

I send it because I was enjoined to do something by Mr. Owen Smith.'

It was then too late for our Christmas number, or, indeed, for the January number; so it was agreed that it should be held over till one of the closing months of this year.

At the moment of going to press, I see it announced that the original manuscripts of his Ghost Stories are to appear at Sotheby's sale on November 9th (written on foolscap paper). The original of "A Vignette", of course, is not among them. Like the others, it is written on lined foolscap.-ED.]

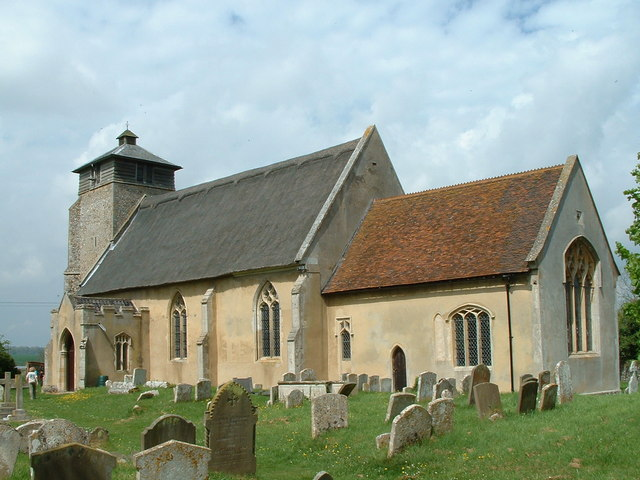
Church of St Peter in Great Livermere where James’ father was Rector from 1865

As with other of James’s ghost stories, "A Vignette" is written as a monologue in the first person with an anonymous narrator recalling some ghostly experiences during his childhood. Like James himself, who was brought up from the age of three in the Rectory in Great Livermere in Suffolk, it being his home from 1865 to 1909, the narrator grew up in a Rectory near a large tree-filled park that had a reputation locally as being haunted. As a young boy, the narrator was afraid of some parts of the park, was deeply affected by nightmares and saw a strange apparition with his own eyes. Even as an adult the narrator would be seized with fear each time he had to walk past the gate to the Plantation.

It has been speculated that the story may be based on a similar apparition seen by James as a boy growing up in Great Livermere where the local park similarly had a reputation for being haunted.

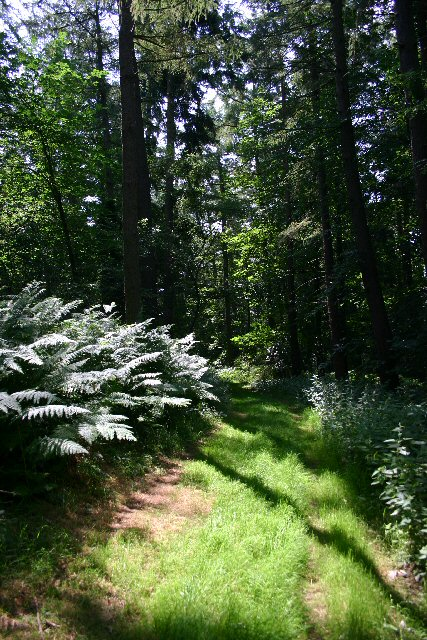
Footpath through the Oldbroom Plantation

As a boy in Great Livermere a favourite spot to play was the Breckland woodlands, at Oldbroom Plantation. James claimed that as a boy he suffered repeated nightmares in which he dreamt that on looking out of his bedroom window in the Rectory he would see strange movements in the garden as some unseen thing moved towards the house. As the sound of footsteps were heard coming up the stairs and an unseen hand reached for his bedroom door the young James would wake up. He begins to wonder if the house is haunted, and when he went into the garden to investigate further he saw a horrific pink, malevolent face with large staring eyes peering back at him through a hole in the gate. James ran back to the house in fear and, on looking back, he later claimed he saw a shrouded figure shuffling away among the trees. The incident was never confirmed or denied as having been an actual supernatural sighting. But if true, it may have been the root of James’s need to explore such themes in his ghost stories written in his adult life.
