= M. R. James =

British author and scholar (1862–1936)

M. R. James OM FBA
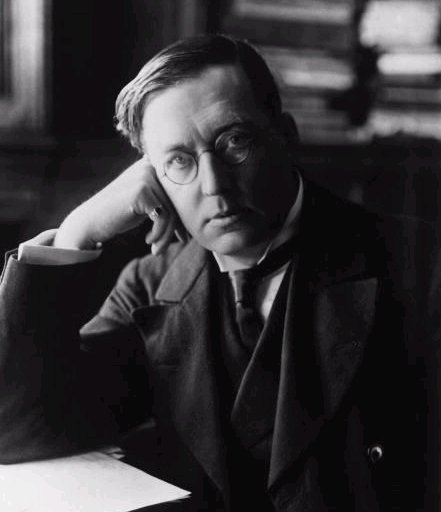
- M. R. James, c. 1900
- Born: Montague Rhodes James; 1 August 1862; Goodnestone, Kent, England
- Died: 12 June 1936 (aged 73); Eton, Buckinghamshire, England
- Education: Eton College; King's College, Cambridge
- Occupations: Author, scholar
- Writing career
- Pen name: M. R. James
- Genres: Horror; ghost stories

Montague Rhodes James (1 August 1862 – 12 June 1936) was an English medievalist scholar and author who served as provost of King's College, Cambridge (1905–1918) and of Eton College (1918–1936), as well as vice-chancellor of the University of Cambridge (1913–1915). James's scholarly work is still highly regarded, but he is best remembered for his ghost stories, which are considered by many critics and authors as the finest in the English language and widely influential on modern horror.

James originally read the stories to friends and select students at Eton and Cambridge as Christmas Eve entertainments, and received wider attention when they were published in the collections Ghost Stories of an Antiquary (1904), More Ghost Stories of an Antiquary (1911), A Thin Ghost and Others (1919), A Warning to the Curious and Other Ghost Stories (1925), and the hardback omnibus The Collected Ghost Stories of M. R. James (1931). James published a further three stories before his death in 1936, and seven previously unpublished or unfinished stories appeared in The Fenstanton Witch and Others: M. R. James in Ghosts and Scholars (1999), all of which have been included in later collections.

James redefined the ghost story for the new century by abandoning many of the formal Gothic clichés of his predecessors, and is noted for his use of realism and dry humour to ground the stories and contrast with the supernatural elements. He is known as the originator of the "antiquarian ghost story" and "the Father of Folk horror" for the way his plots and characters drew on his own scholarly interests in ancient folklore and the rural landscapes of East Anglia. This association has continued into the 21st century due to the many adaptations of his stories, which have made him, according to critic Jon Dear, "the go-to folk horror writer".

== Early life ==
James was born in a clergy house in Goodnestone, Dover, Kent, England, although his parents had associations with Aldeburgh in Suffolk. His father was Herbert James, an Evangelical Anglican clergyman, and his mother, Mary Emily (née Horton), was the daughter of a naval officer. He had two older brothers, Sydney and Herbert (nicknamed "Ber"), and an older sister, Grace. A cousin was Margaret Helen James.

Sydney James later became Archdeacon of Dudley. From the age of three (1865) until 1909 James's home, if not always his residence, was at the Rectory in Great Livermere, Suffolk. This had previously been the childhood home of another eminent Suffolk antiquary, Thomas Martin of Palgrave (1696–1771). Several of James's ghost stories are set in Suffolk, including "'Oh, Whistle, and I'll Come to You, My Lad'" (Felixstowe), "A Warning to the Curious" (Aldeburgh), "Rats" and "A Vignette" (Great Livermere).

In September 1873, he arrived as a boarder at Temple Grove School in East Sheen, west London, one of the leading boys' preparatory schools of the day.

From September 1876 to August 1882, he studied at Eton College, where he claimed to have translated the Book of Baruch from its original Ethiopic in 1879. He lived for many years, first as an undergraduate (1882–1885), then as a don and provost, at King's College, Cambridge, where he was also a member of the Pitt Club.

The university provides settings for several of his tales. Apart from medieval subjects, James toured Europe often, including a memorable 1884 tour of France in a Cheylesmore tricycle, studied the classics and appeared very successfully in a staging of Aristophanes' play The Birds, with music by Hubert Parry. His ability as an actor was also apparent when he read his new ghost stories to friends at Christmas time.

== Scholarly works ==
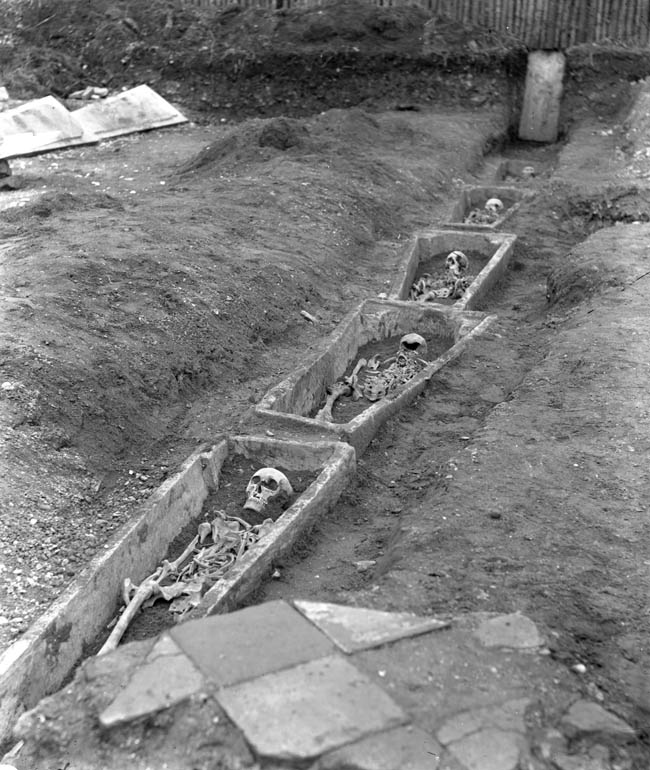
M. R. James's scholarly work uncovered the burial places of the abbots of Bury St Edmunds Abbey in 1903 (from front to rear): Edmund of Walpole (1248–1256); Henry of Rushbrooke (1235–1248); Richard of the Isle of Ely (1229–1234); Samson (1182–1211); and Ording (1148–1157).

James is best known for his ghost stories, but his work as a medievalist scholar was prodigious and remains highly respected in scholarly circles. Indeed, the success of his stories was founded on his antiquarian talents and knowledge. His discovery of a manuscript fragment led to excavations in the ruins of the abbey at Bury St Edmunds, West Suffolk, in 1902, in which the graves of several twelfth-century abbots described by Jocelyn de Brakelond (a contemporary chronicler) were rediscovered, having been lost since the dissolution of the monasteries.

He held the Sandars Readership in Bibliography two times, speaking on "Manuscripts in Cambridge" in 1902 and "The Pictorial Illustration of the Old Testament from the 14th Century to the 16th" in 1923.

He published a detailed description of the sculptured ceiling bosses of the cloisters of Norwich Cathedral in 1911. This included drawings of all the bosses in the north walk by C. J. W. Winter. His 1917 edition of the Latin hagiography of Æthelberht II of East Anglia, king and martyr, remains authoritative. In 1919, he published an English translation of John Blacman's biography of King Henry VI.

He catalogued many of the manuscript libraries of the colleges of the University of Cambridge. Among his other scholarly works, he wrote The Apocalypse in Art, which placed the English Apocalypse manuscripts into families. He also translated the New Testament apocrypha and contributed to the Encyclopaedia Biblica (1903). His ability to wear his learning lightly is apparent in his Suffolk and Norfolk (Dent, 1930), in which a great deal of knowledge is presented in a popular and accessible form, and in Abbeys.

He also achieved a great deal during his directorship of the Fitzwilliam Museum in Cambridge (1893–1908). He managed to secure a large number of important paintings and manuscripts, including notable portraits by Titian.

James was provost of Eton College from 1918 to 1936. He was admitted to the Order of Merit in 1930. He died in 1936 (age 73) and was buried in Eton town cemetery.

== Ghost stories ==
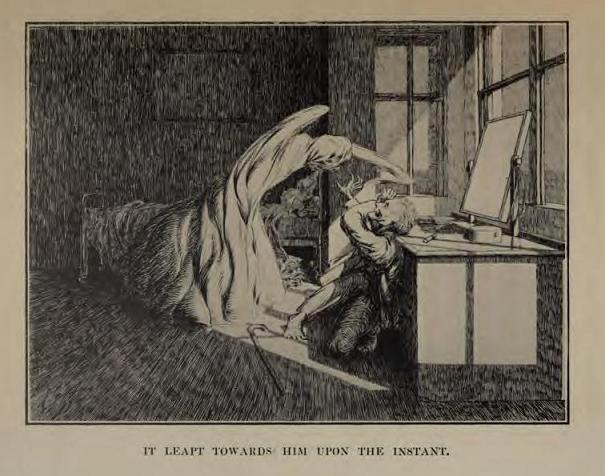
Illustration by James McBryde for M. R. James's story "'Oh, Whistle, and I'll Come to You, My Lad'". James was close friends with the illustrator, and the collection Ghost Stories of an Antiquary in 1904 was intended as a showcase for McBryde's artwork, but McBryde died having completed only four plates.

James's ghost stories were published in a series of collections: Ghost Stories of an Antiquary (1904), More Ghost Stories of an Antiquary (1911), A Thin Ghost and Others (1919), and A Warning to the Curious and Other Ghost Stories (1925). The first hardback collected edition appeared in 1931. Many of the tales were written as Christmas Eve entertainments and read aloud to friends. This idea was used by the BBC in 2000 when they filmed Christopher Lee reading James's stories in a candle-lit room in King's College.

James perfected a method of story-telling which has since become known as Jamesian. The classic Jamesian tale usually includes the following elements:

1. a characterful setting in an English village, seaside town or country estate; an ancient town in France, Denmark or Sweden; or a venerable abbey or university
2. a nondescript and rather naive gentleman-scholar as protagonist (often of a reserved nature)
3. the discovery of an old book or other antiquarian object that somehow unlocks, calls down the wrath, or at least attracts the unwelcome attention of a supernatural menace, usually from beyond the grave

According to James, the story must "put the reader into the position of saying to himself, 'If I'm not very careful, something of this kind may happen to me!'" He also perfected the technique of narrating supernatural events through implication and suggestion, letting his reader fill in the blanks, and focusing on the mundane details of his settings and characters to throw the horrific and bizarre elements into greater relief. He summed up his approach in his foreword to the anthology Ghosts and Marvels: "Two ingredients most valuable in the concocting of a ghost story are, to me, the atmosphere and the nicely managed crescendo. ... Let us, then, be introduced to the actors in a placid way; let us see them going about their ordinary business, undisturbed by forebodings, pleased with their surroundings; and into this calm environment let the ominous thing put out its head, unobtrusively at first, and then more insistently, until it holds the stage."

He also noted: "Another requisite, in my opinion, is that the ghost should be malevolent or odious: amiable and helpful apparitions are all very well in fairy tales or in local legends, but I have no use for them in a fictitious ghost story."

Despite his suggestion (in the essay "Stories I Have Tried to Write") that writers employ reticence in their work, many of James's tales depict scenes and images of savage and often disturbing violence. For example, in "Lost Hearts", pubescent children are taken in by a sinister dabbler in the occult who cuts their hearts from their still-living bodies. In a 1929 essay, James stated:

Reticence may be an elderly doctrine to preach, yet from the artistic point of view, I am sure it is a sound one. Reticence conduces to effect, blatancy ruins it, and there is much blatancy in a lot of recent stories. They drag in sex too, which is a fatal mistake; sex is tiresome enough in the novels; in a ghost story, or as the backbone of a ghost story, I have no patience with it. At the same time don't let us be mild and drab. Malevolence and terror, the glare of evil faces, 'the stony grin of unearthly malice', pursuing forms in darkness, and 'long-drawn, distant screams', are all in place, and so is a modicum of blood, shed with deliberation and carefully husbanded; the weltering and wallowing that I too often encounter merely recall the methods of M G Lewis.

Although not overtly sexual, plots of this nature have been perceived as unintentional metaphors of the Freudian variety. James's biographer Michael Cox wrote in M. R. James: An Informal Portrait (1983), "One need not be a professional psychoanalyst to see the ghost stories as some release from feelings held in check." Reviewing this biography (Daily Telegraph, 1983), the novelist and diarist Anthony Powell, who attended Eton under James's tutelage, commented that "I myself have heard it suggested that James's (of course platonic) love affairs were in fact fascinating to watch." Powell was referring to James's relationships with his pupils, not his peers.

Other critics have seen complex psychological undercurrents in James's work. His authorial revulsion from tactile contact with other people has been noted by Julia Briggs in Night Visitors: The Rise and Fall of the English Ghost Story (1977). As Nigel Kneale wrote in the introduction to the Folio Society edition of Ghost Stories of M. R. James, "In an age where every man is his own psychologist, M. R. James looks like rich and promising material. ... There must have been times when it was hard to be Monty James." Or, to put it another way, "Although James conjures up strange beasts and supernatural manifestations, the shock effect of his stories is usually strongest when he is dealing in physical mutilation and abnormality, generally sketched in with the lightest of pens."

In addition to writing his own stories, James championed the works of Sheridan Le Fanu, whom he viewed as "absolutely in the first rank as a writer of ghost stories", editing and supplying introductions to Madame Crowl's Ghost (1923) and Uncle Silas (1926).

James's statements about his actual beliefs about ghosts are ambiguous. He wrote, "I answer that I am prepared to consider evidence and accept it if it satisfies me."

== Views on literature and politics ==
James held strongly traditional views about literature. In addition to ghost stories, he also enjoyed reading the work of William Shakespeare, the detective stories of Agatha Christie, and the works of Charles Dickens and P. G. Wodehouse. He disliked most contemporary literature, strongly criticising the work of Aldous Huxley, Lytton Strachey and James Joyce (whom he called "a charlatan" and "that prostitutor of life and language"). He also supported the banning of Radclyffe Hall's 1928 novel about lesbianism, The Well of Loneliness, stating, "I believe Miss Hall's book is about birth control or some kindred subject, isn't it? I find it difficult to believe either that it is a good novel or that its suppression causes any loss to literature."

When he was a student at King's College, James had opposed the appointment of Thomas Henry Huxley as provost of Eton because of Huxley's agnosticism; he later became provost of Eton himself. In his later life James showed little interest in politics and rarely spoke on political issues. However, he often spoke out against the Irish Home Rule movement, and in his letters he also expressed a dislike for Communism. His friend A. C. Benson considered him to be "reactionary" and "against modernity and progress".

== Reception and influence ==
H. P. Lovecraft was an admirer of James's work, extolling the stories as the peak of the ghost story form in his essay "Supernatural Horror in Literature" (1927). Another renowned fan of James in the horror and fantasy genre was Clark Ashton Smith, who wrote an essay on him. Michael Sadleir described James as "the best ghost-story writer England has ever produced". Marjorie Bowen also admired his work, referring to his ghost stories as "the supreme art of M. R. James". Mary Butts, another admirer, wrote the first critical essay on his work, "The Art of Montagu James", in the February 1934 issue of the London Mercury. Manly Wade Wellman esteemed his fiction. In The Great Railway Bazaar, Paul Theroux refers to "The Mezzotint" as "the most frightening story I know". In his list "The 13 Most Terrifying Horror Stories", T. E. D. Klein placed James's "Casting the Runes" at number one. E. F. Bleiler stated that James is "in the opinion of many, the foremost modern writer of supernatural fiction", and he described Ghost Stories of an Antiquary as "one of the landmark books in the history of supernatural fiction" and characterised the stories in James's other collections as "first-rate stories" and "excellent stories". Ruth Rendell has also expressed admiration for James's work, stating, "There are some authors one wished one had never read in order to have the joy of reading them for the first time. For me, M. R. James is one of these." David Langford has described James as the author of "the 20th century's most influential canon of ghost stories".

Sir John Betjeman, in an introduction to Peter Haining's book about James, shows how influenced he was by James's work:

In the year 1920 I was a new boy at the Dragon School, Oxford, then called Lynam's, of which the headmaster was C. C. Lynam, known as 'the Skipper'. He dressed and looked like an old Sea Salt, and in his gruff voice would tell us stories by firelight in the boys' room of an evening with all the lights out and his back to the fire. I remember he told the stories as having happened to himself. ... they were the best stories I ever heard, and gave me an interest in old churches, and country houses, and Scandinavia that not even the mighty Hans Christian Andersen eclipsed.

Betjeman later discovered the stories were all based on those of M. R. James.

H. Russell Wakefield's supernatural fiction was strongly influenced by the work of James. A large number of British writers deliberately wrote ghost stories in the Jamesian style; these writers, sometimes described as the "James Gang", include A. N. L. Munby, E. G. Swain, "Ingulphus" (pseudonym of Sir Arthur Gray, 1852–1940), Amyas Northcote and R. H. Malden, although some commentators consider their stories to be inferior to those of James himself. Although most of the early Jamesian writers were male, there were several notable female writers of such fiction, including Eleanor Scott (pseudonym of Helen M. Leys, 1892–1965) in the stories of her book Randall's Round (1929) and D. K. Broster in the collection Couching at the Door: Strange and Macabre Tales (1942). L. T. C. Rolt also modelled his ghost stories on James's work, but, unlike other Jamesian writers, set them in industrial locations, such as mines and railways.

James's stories continue to influence many of today's great supernatural writers, including Stephen King (who discusses James in the 1981 non-fiction book Danse Macabre) and Ramsey Campbell, who edited Meddling with Ghosts: Stories in the Tradition of M. R. James and wrote the short story "The Guide" in tribute. The author John Bellairs paid homage to James by incorporating plot elements borrowed from James's ghost stories into several of his own juvenile mysteries. Several of Jonathan Aycliffe's novels, including Whispers in the Dark and The Matrix are influenced by James's work. Aycliffe/MacEoin studied for his PhD in Persian Studies at King's College, Cambridge. This makes three King's College authors of ghost stories (James, Munby and Aycliffe).

=== Works inspired by James ===
H. Russell Wakefield's story "'He Cometh and He Passeth By!'" (1928) is a homage to James's "Casting the Runes".

W. F. Harvey's ghost story "The Ankardyne Pew" (1928) is also a homage to James's work, which Harvey admired.

The composer Kaikhosru Shapurji Sorabji wrote two pieces for piano with a link to James: Quaere reliqua hujus materiei inter secretiora (1940), inspired by "Count Magnus", and St. Bertrand de Comminges: "He was laughing in the tower" (1941), inspired by "Canon Alberic's Scrap-Book".

Gerald Heard's novel The Black Fox, published in 1950, is an occult thriller inspired by "The Stalls of Barchester Cathedral".

Kingsley Amis's 1969 novel The Green Man is partly a homage to James's ghost stories.

Between 1976 and 1992, Sheila Hodgson authored and produced for BBC Radio 4 a series of plays which portrayed M. R. James as the diarist of a series of fictional ghost stories, mainly inspired by fragments referred to in his essay "Stories I Have Tried to Write". These consisted of Whisper in the Ear (October 1976), Turn, Turn, Turn (March 1977), The Backward Glance (22 September 1977), Here Am I, Where Are You? (29 December 1977), Echoes from the Abbey (21 November 1984), The Lodestone (19 April 1989), and The Boat Hook (15 April 1992). David March appeared as James in all but the final two, which starred Michael Williams. Raidió Teilifís Éireann also broadcast The Fellow Travellers, with Aiden Grennell as James, on 20 February 1994. All the stories later appeared in Hodgson's collection The Fellow Travellers and Other Ghost Stories (Ash-Tree Press, 1998).

On Christmas Day 1987, The Teeth of Abbot Thomas, a James parody by Stephen Sheridan, was broadcast on Radio 4. It starred Alfred Marks (as Abbot Thomas), Robert Bathurst, Denise Coffey, Jonathan Adams and Bill Wallis.

In 1989, Ramsey Campbell published the short story "The Guide", which takes an antiquarian on a macabre journey to a ruined church after following marginalia in a copy of James's guidebook Suffolk and Norfolk. In 2001, Campbell edited the anthology Meddling with Ghosts: Stories in the Tradition of M. R. James.

The novelist James Hynes wrote an updated version of "Casting the Runes" in his 1997 story collection Publish and Perish.

In 2003, Radio 4 broadcast The House at World's End by Stephen Sheridan. A pastiche of James's work, it contained numerous echoes of his stories while offering a fictional account of how he became interested in the supernatural. The older James was played by John Rowe, and the younger James by Jonathan Keeble.

Chris Priestley's Uncle Montague's Tales of Terror (2007) is a volume of ghost stories influenced by James in mood, atmosphere, and subject matter, as the title suggests.

In 2008 the English experimental neofolk duo The Triple Tree, featuring Tony Wakeford and Andrew King from Sol Invictus, released the album Ghosts on which all but three songs were based upon the stories of James. One of the songs, "Three Crowns" (based on the short story "A Warning to the Curious"), also appeared on the compilation album John Barleycorn Reborn (2007).

Helen Grant's novel The Glass Demon (2010) was inspired by "The Treasure of Abbot Thomas".

In February 2012, the UK psychedelic band The Future Kings of England released their fourth album, Who Is This Who Is Coming, based on James's "'Oh, Whistle, and I'll Come to You, My Lad'". An instrumental work, it evokes the story from beginning to end, with the tracks segueing into one another to form a continuous piece of music.

On 23 February 2012 the Royal Mail released a stamp featuring James as part its "Britons of Distinction" series.

In 2013, the Fan Museum in London hosted two performances of The Laws of Shadows, a play by Adrian Drew about M. R. James. The play is set in James's rooms at Cambridge University and deals with his relationships with his colleague E. F. Benson and the young artist James McBryde.

On 9 January 2019, in the third episode of the seventh series of the BBC One programme Father Brown, titled "The Whistle in the Dark", the character Professor Robert Wiseman reads a collection of ghost stories by M. R. James and later suggests that the whistle in his possession is the one described in James's "'Oh, Whistle, and I'll Come to You, My Lad'".

Comedian and writer John Finnemore is a fan of the ghost stories of M. R. James. His radio sketch series John Finnemore's Souvenir Programme, first broadcast in 2011, features the recurring character of a storyteller (a fictionalised version of Finnemore) who tells tall tales partly influenced by M. R. James's ghost stories. During the ninth series broadcast in 2021, which underwent a format change due to the coronavirus pandemic, Oswald 'Uncle Newt' Nightingale, analogous with Finnemore's storyteller character, meets M. R. James during the Christmas of 1899 as a young boy, who proceeds to tell him the story of The Rose Garden. Later in Uncle Newt's life (or earlier in the series), he tells an iteration of said story whilst babysitting Deborah and Myra Wilkinson.

In 2022, British post punk band Funboy Five released "Kissing the Ghost of M R James" and "A Warning to the Curious (Disturbed Mix)", a remix of a song, based on the James story, that first appeared on their 2019 release An Autumn Collection.

== Adaptations ==
There have been numerous adaptations of the works of M. R. James for radio and television, as well as a 1957 film adaptation of "Casting the Runes" by Jacques Tourneur, titled Night of the Demon (US title Curse of the Demon).

== Personal life ==
James became guardian to Jane, the daughter of James and Gwendolen McBryde, after James McBryde's death, which occurred shortly after their marriage, when he was 29 or 30. His subsequent letters to Jane and Gwendolen were published in 1956 as Letters to a Friend, which Gwendolen (also an artist and writer) edited.

== Works ==
=== Scholarly works ===
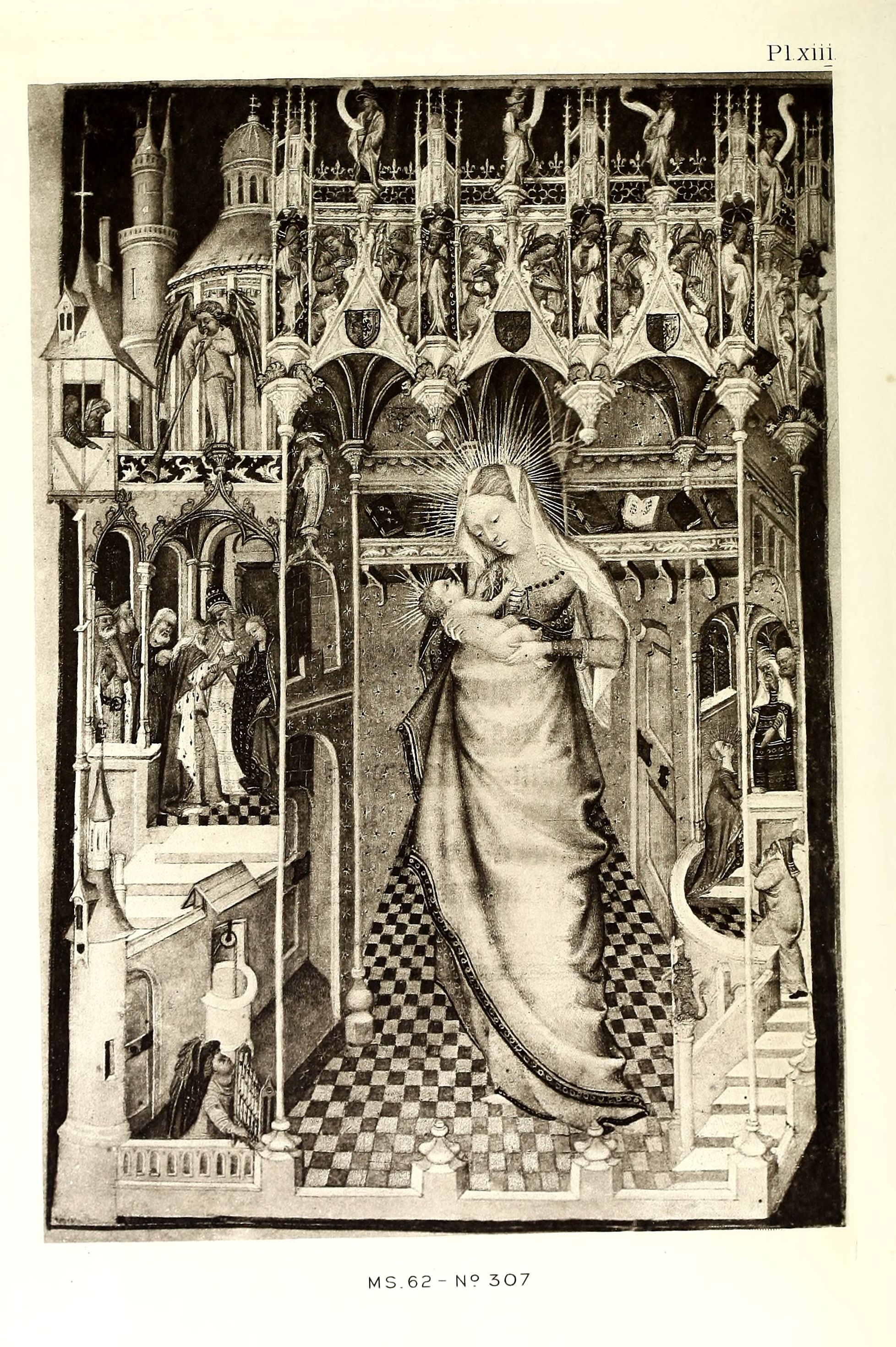
The Virgin Mary: page from a 15th-century book of hours from the catalogue of the Fitzwilliam Museum

- A Descriptive Catalogue of the Manuscripts in the Library of Peterhouse. Cambridge University Press, 1899. Reissued by the publisher, 2009. ISBN 978-1-108-00307-0
- Walter Map : De Nugis Curialium (ed.) Anecdota Oxoniensia; Mediaeval and Modern Series 14. Oxford : Clarendon Press, 1914.
- A Descriptive Catalogue of the Library of Samuel Pepys. Sidgwick and Jackson, 1923. Reissued by Cambridge University Press, 2009. ISBN 978-1-108-00205-9
- A Descriptive Catalogue of the Manuscripts in the Fitzwilliam Museum. Cambridge University Press, 1895. Reissued by the publisher, 2009. ISBN 978-1-108-00396-4
- A Descriptive Catalogue of the Manuscripts in the Library of Corpus Christi College, Cambridge. Volume 1; Volume 2. Cambridge University Press, 1912. Reissued by the publisher, 2009. ISBN 978-1-108-00485-5
- A Descriptive Catalogue of the Manuscripts in the Library of Gonville and Caius College. Volume 1; Volume 2. Cambridge University Press, 1907. Reissued by the publisher, 2009; ISBN 978-1-108-00248-6
- A Descriptive Catalogue of the Manuscripts in the Library of Jesus College. Clay and Sons, 1895. Reissued by Cambridge University Press, 2009. ISBN 978-1-108-00351-3
- A Descriptive Catalogue of the Manuscripts in the Library of Pembroke College, Cambridge. Cambridge University Press, 1905. Reissued by the publisher, 2009. ISBN 978-1-108-00028-4
- A Descriptive Catalogue of the Manuscripts in the Library of St John's College, Cambridge. Cambridge University Press, 1913. Reissued by the publisher, 2009. ISBN 978-1-108-00310-0
- St. George's Chapel, Windsor : the woodwork of the choir. Windsor : Oxley & Son, 1933.

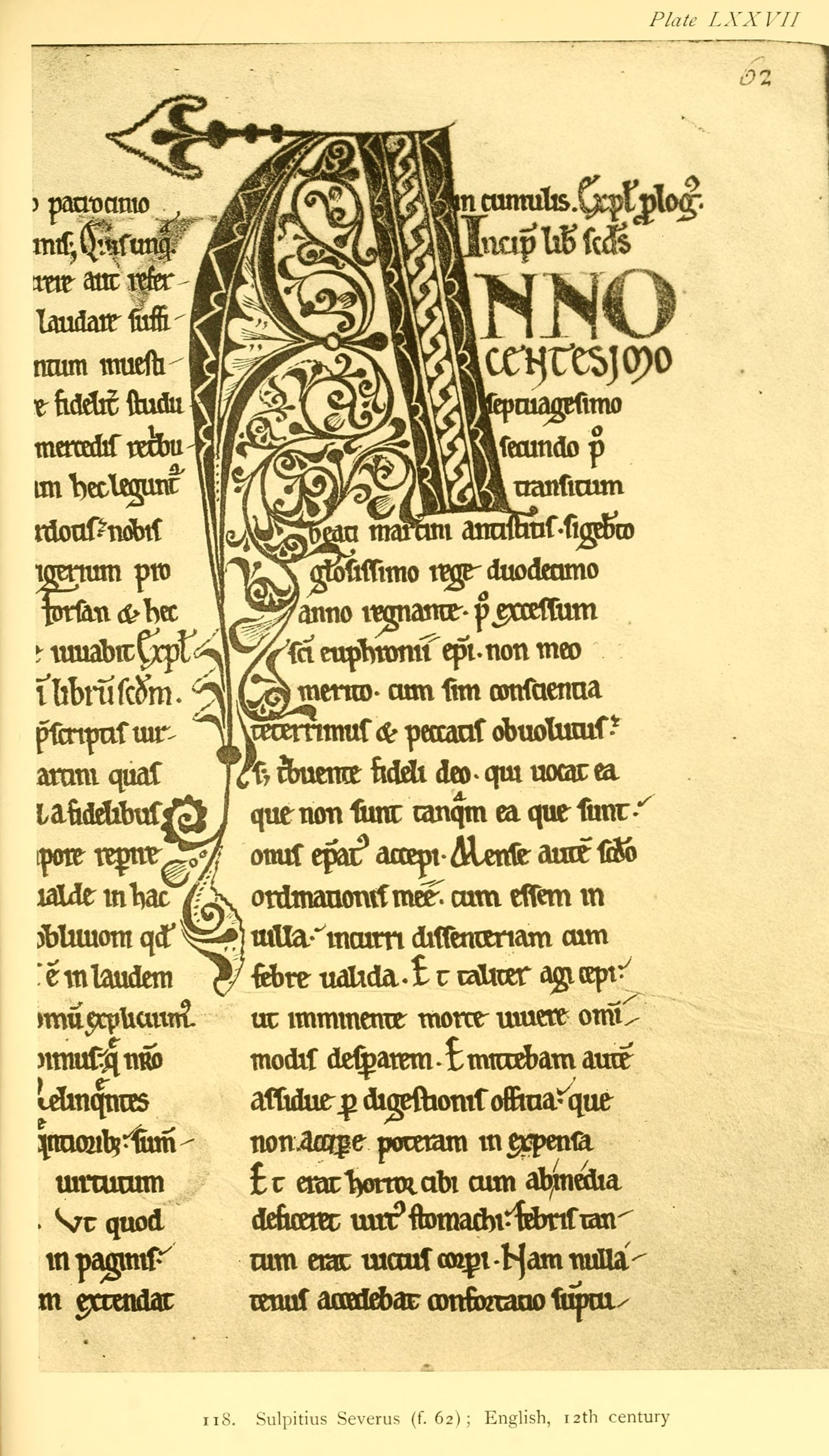
Page of a 12th-century English manuscript from the catalogue of the McClean Collection, Cambridge

- A Descriptive Catalogue of the McClean Collection of Manuscripts in the Fitzwilliam Museum. Cambridge University Press, 1913. Reissued by the publisher, 2009. ISBN 978-1-108-00309-4
- Apocrypha Anecdota. 1893–1897.
- Descriptive Catalogues of the Manuscripts in the Libraries of Some Cambridge Colleges. Cambridge University Press, 2009. ISBN 978-1-108-00258-5
- Address at the Unveiling of the Roll of Honour of the Cambridge Tipperary Club.. 1916.
- Henry the Sixth: A Reprint of John Blacman's Memoir. 1919.
- Lists of manuscripts formerly in Peterborough Abbey library: with preface and identifications. Oxford University Press, 1926. Reissued by Cambridge University Press, 2010. ISBN 978-1-108-01135-8
- "New and Old at Cambridge", article on the Cambridge of 1882, in Fifty Years: Memories and Contrasts, various contributors, Thornton Butterworth, 1932
- Latin Infancy Gospels: A New Text, With a Parallel Version from Irish. Cambridge University Press, 1927.
- The Apocalypse in Art. Schweich Lectures for 1927.
- The Apocryphal New Testament. 1924.
- The Bestiary: Being a Reproduction in Full of the Manuscript Ii.4.26 in the University Library, Cambridge. Printed for the Roxburghe club, by John Johnson at the University Press, 1928.
- The Biblical Antiquities of Philo. 1917.
- The Lost Apocrypha of the Old Testament. Vol. 1, 1920.
- The Wanderings and Homes of Manuscripts. 1919.
- Two Ancient English Scholars: St Aldhelm and William of Malmesbury. 1931.
- The Western Manuscripts in the Library of Emmanuel College. Cambridge University Press, 1904. Reissued by the publisher, 2009. ISBN 978-1-108-00308-7
- The Western Manuscripts in the Library of Trinity College. Volume 1; Volume 2; Volume 3; Volume 4. Cambridge University Press, 1904. Reissued by the publisher, 2009. ISBN 978-1-108-00288-2

=== Ghost stories ===
==== First book publications ====
- Ghost Stories of an Antiquary. 1904. 8 stories.
- More Ghost Stories of an Antiquary. 1911. 7 stories.
- A Thin Ghost and Others. 1919. 5 stories.
- A Warning to the Curious and Other Ghost Stories. 1925. 6 stories.
- Wailing Well. 1928 (tale), Mill House Press, Stanford Dingley.

==== First magazine publication of uncollected tales ====
- "After Dark in the Playing Fields", in College Days (Eton ephemeral magazine), no. 10 (28 June 1924), pp. 311–312, 314
- "There Was a Man Dwelt by a Churchyard", in Snapdragon (Eton ephemeral magazine), 6 December 1924, pp. 4–5
- "Rats", in At Random (Eton ephemeral magazine), 23 March 1929, pp. 12–14
- "The Experiment: A New Year's Eve Ghost Story", in Morning Post, 31 December 1931, p. 8
- "The Malice of Inanimate Objects", in The Masquerade (Eton ephemeral magazine), no. 1 (June 1933), pp. 29–32
- "A Vignette", written 1935, in London Mercury 35 (November 1936), pp. 18–22

==== Reprint collections ====
- The Collected Ghost Stories of M. R. James. 1931. Contains the 26 stories from the original four books, plus "After Dark in the Playing Fields" (1924), "There Was a Man Dwelt by a Churchyard" (1924), "Wailing Well" (1928), and "Rats" (1929). It does not include three stories completed between 1931 and James's death in 1936.
- Best Ghost Stories of M. R. James. 1944.
- The Ghost Stories of M. R. James. 1986. Selection by Michael Cox, including an excellent introduction with numerous photographs.
- Two Ghost Stories: A Centenary. 1993.
- The Fenstanton Witch and Others: M. R. James in Ghosts and Scholars. 1999. Contains seven unpublished or unfinished tales or drafts: "A Night in King's College Chapel" (1892?), "The Fenstanton Witch" (1924?), "John Humphreys" (unfinished, pre-1911), "Marcilly-le-Hayer"(story draft, pre-1929), "Speaker Lenthall's Tomb" (unfinished, 1890s?), "The Game of Bear" (unfinished) and "Merfield House" (unfinished).
- A Pleasing Terror: The Complete Supernatural Writings. 2001. Ash-Tree Press. Contains 40 stories: the 30 stories from Collected Ghost Stories, the three tales published after them and the seven items from The Fenstanton Witch and Others. It also includes some related non-fiction by James and some writings about him by others. It is the only complete collection of his ghost fiction, although revised versions of unfinished tales and drafts have subsequently appeared on the Ghosts and Scholars website, following further deciphering of James's handwriting.
- Count Magnus and Other Ghost Stories: The complete ghost stories of M. R. James, Volume 1. 2005. Edited, with an introduction and notes, by S. T. Joshi.
- The Haunted Dolls' House and Other Ghost Stories: The complete ghost stories of M. R. James, Volume 2. 2006. Edited, with an introduction and notes, by S. T. Joshi.
- Curious Warnings: The Complete Ghost Stories of M. R. James. 2012. Edited, reparagraphing the text for the modern reader, by Stephen Jones.

=== Guidebooks ===
- Abbeys. 1925.
- Suffolk and Norfolk. 1930.

=== Children's books ===
- The Five Jars. 1922.
- As translator: Forty-Two Stories, by Hans Christian Andersen, translated and with an introduction by M. R. James. 1930.

=== Memoirs ===
- Eton and King's: Recollections, Mostly Trivial, 1875–1925, Cambridge University Press, 1925. ISBN 978-1-108-03053-3.

Academic offices
| Preceded by John Henry Middleton | Director of the Fitzwilliam Museum; 1893–1908 | Succeeded by Sir Sydney Cockerell |
| Preceded by Augustus Austen Leigh | Provost of King's College, Cambridge; 1905–1918 | Succeeded by Walter Durnford |
| Preceded by Edmond Warre | Provost of Eton; 1918–1936 | Succeeded by Lord Hugh Cecil |
