= A View from a Hill (short story) =

- Short story by M. R. James
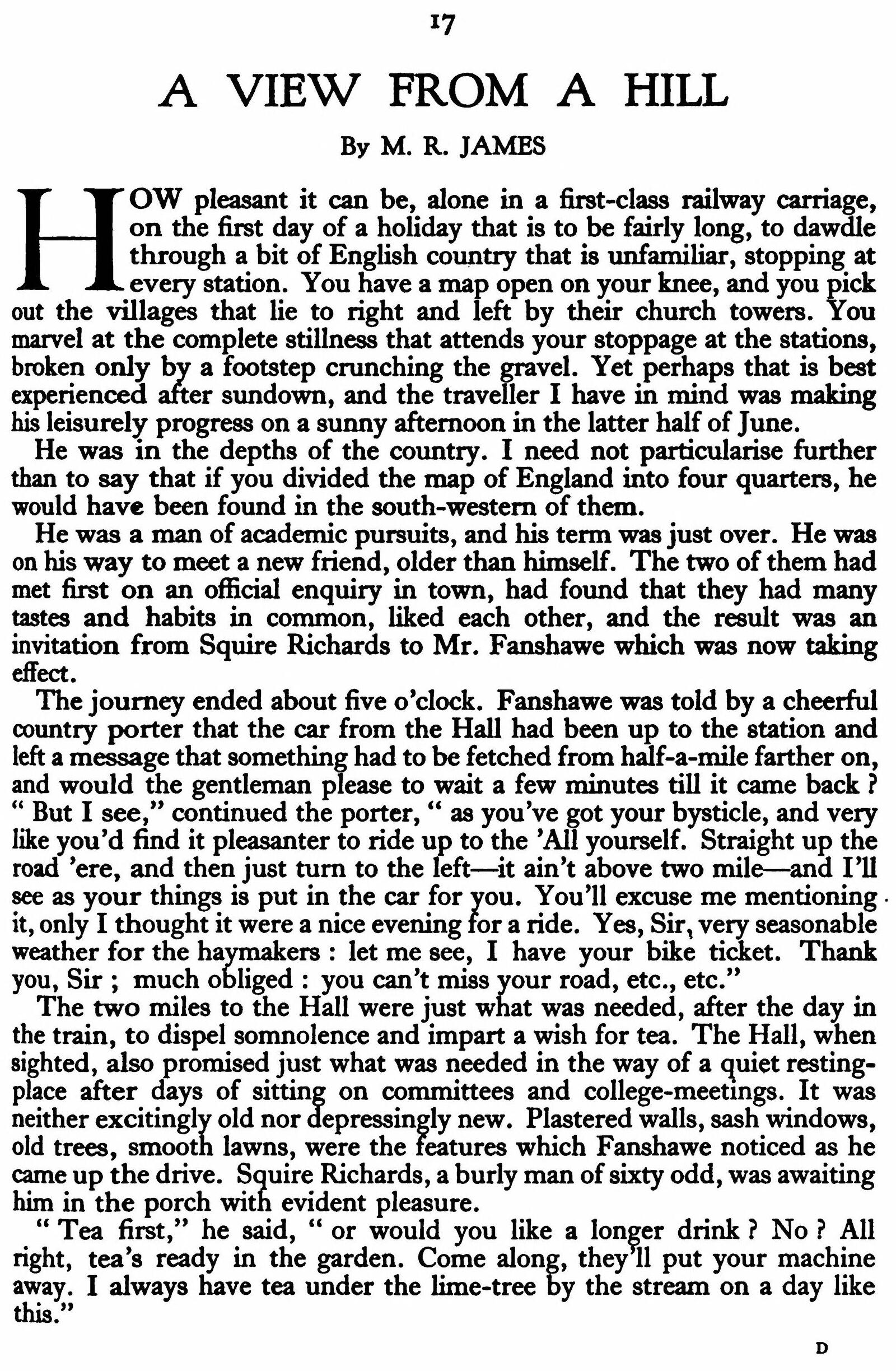
- The first page of "A View from a Hill" as it appeared in the London Mercury.

Text available at Wikisource
- Country: United Kingdom
- Language: English
- Genre: Ghost story

Publication
- Published in: London Mercury
- Publication type: Print, magazine
- Publication date: May 1925

"A View from a Hill" is a ghost story by British writer M. R. James, first published in the London Mercury in 1925, and collected in James' books A Warning to the Curious and Other Ghost Stories (1925) and The Collected Ghost Stories of M. R. James (1931). It concerns a mysterious set of binoculars that show scenes from the past. It was adapted for television by the BBC in 2005 as part of its series A Ghost Story for Christmas.

== Plot summary ==
Academic Fanshawe visits his friend, squire Henry Richards, in the English countryside (Note: James stated that the story is imagined to take place in Herefordshire.) for a summer retreat. On the first evening, they decide to climb a hill with a view of the area. Fanshawe, lacking binoculars, borrows a heavy, old-fashioned pair from Richards, which are stored in a difficult-to-open box. After Fanshawe sustains a minor cut opening it, they set out, with Richards pointing out the local landmark known as "Baxter's Roman villa." He explains that Baxter, an unpopular watchmaker and amateur archaeologist, crafted the binoculars and subsequently uncovered various artifacts later acquired by Richards.

At the hill's summit, Richards instructs Fanshawe to observe Fulnaker Abbey through the binoculars. Fanshawe, however, insists the tower he sees is impressive, which Richards disputes, suggesting he's mistakenly viewing Oldbourne Church. Fanshawe, through the binoculars, also perceives a disturbing scene on Gallows Hill: a gibbet and a crowd around it, which, Richards assures him, does not exist. When Fanshawe looks without the binoculars, he sees only trees. Puzzled but intrigued, Fanshawe decides to investigate Oldbourne Church and Gallows Hill the following day.

That night, Fanshawe has a nightmare involving a stone marked with a warning signed by Richards' elderly butler, Patten, and a hand emerging from the ground. The next morning, Fanshawe reviews archaeological journals containing Baxter's work and finds his tone arrogant and dismissive. One journal includes Baxter’s sketch of Fulnaker Abbey's priory tower, showing a structure identical to the one which Fanshawe saw through the binoculars, though no such tower remains.

That afternoon, Fanshawe sets off by bicycle to explore Oldbourne Church and Gallows Hill. At Richards' suggestion, he also visits Lambsfield Church to see its stained-glass window. There, he attempts to use the binoculars to read the window's inscriptions but finds they do not work inside the church. Oldbourne Church's tower appears entirely different from what he saw the day before. When he arrives at Gallows Hill, he discovers it densely wooded, with no sign of the gibbet. Feeling watched, he experiences unsettling sensations of unseen figures around him and flees after finding three stones on the hill, without stepping between them.

Back at Richards' home, Patten shares troubling stories about Baxter, who behaved suspiciously and refused religious practices. A priest who once visited Baxter refused to speak about the encounter, hinting at something sinister. Baxter reportedly spent many nights on Gallows Hill, and, after a bizarre scalding incident, he exhibited strange behaviour, moving as if controlled by an unseen force. He was later found dead between the three stones on Gallows Hill, his neck broken.

The next morning, Fanshawe attempts to look through the binoculars but sees only darkness. (Note: The glasses ceased to work due to having been taken inside Oldbourne Church.) When Richards tries, he sees the same. They drop the binoculars, which crack open, releasing a foul-smelling black liquid. Richards realizes Baxter may have used boiled bones from hanged men to make the binoculars, attempting to let viewers "see through a dead man’s eyes". However, the spirits of the deceased likely retaliated against Baxter, leading to his grim fate. Finally, Richards decides the binoculars must be buried, putting Baxter's misdeeds to rest.

== Publication ==
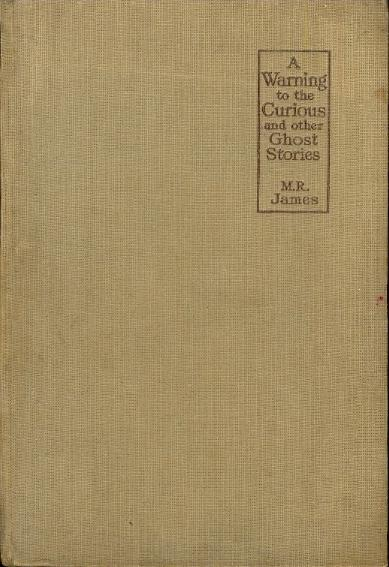
"A View from a Hill" was collected in James' book A Warning to the Curious in 1925

"A View from a Hill" was first published in volume XII, number 67 of the London Mercury in May 1925. Later that year, it was collected in James' book A Warning to the Curious and Other Ghost Stories. It has since been collected many times, including in The Collected Ghost Stories of M. R. James in 1931 and in The Sleeping and the Dead in 1947.

== Reception ==
Vybarr Cregan-Reid describes "A View from a Hill" as an example of "folk horror" and "as much a warning to the nostalgic as it is to the curious; a little nostalgia can be dangerous thing". Sam Wiseman notes "A View from a Hill" as reversing the trope of "an area's previous woodland character casting a temporal shadow", noting that "trees are not the source of Gothic energy, but rather a relatively new presence that masks the site's disturbing past". Rosemary Pardoe and Darroll Pardoe state that "A View from a Hill" "...contains one of [James'] most vivid evocations of landscape". Robert McFarlane notes that James conceives the English landscape as "constituted by uncanny forces, part-buried sufferings, and contested ownerships", adding that for James, landscape "is never a smooth surface or a simple stage-set, there to offer picturesque consolations. Rather it is a realm that snags, bites, and troubles. [James] repeatedly invokes the pastoral—that green dream of natural tranquility and social order—only to traumatize it".

Stephen Daniels draws parallels between "A View from a Hill" and Alfred Watkins' book The Old Straight Track (also published in 1925), interpreting "A View from a Hill" as "an oblique warning to those who might seek to follow in Watkins' footsteps". Similarly, Timothy Jones writes that "Watkins's reading of the British landscape echoes M. R. James, who in tales like 'A View from a Hill' or 'A Warning to the Curious', describes the land as containing and revealing the violence and contested ownership of its history". Rosemary Pardoe and Darroll Pardoe suggest that James may have read, and been inspired by, Watkins' 1922 work Early British Trackways, Moats, Mounds, Camps and Sites.

Patrick J. Murphy describes Baxter, the villain of "A View from a Hill" as one of James' examples of "...compelling villains precisely because their scholarly transgressions defy easy categorization, their monstrosity comprising an admixture of antiquarian excess and occupational degradation".

Jane Mainley-Piddock notes "The Jamesian object, like the scrapbook in 'Canon Alberic's Scrapbook' or the mezzotint in the story of the same name is, again, one of Reza Negarestani's inorganic demons or cursed objects" and that "The combination of schoolboy pranking, disdain for over-reacting, black humour and inorganic demons could only be found in a James story".

Jack Sullivan writes "Though James's rendering of dialect is skillful and idiomatic, he tends to overuse these servant recapitulations of horror scenes. After a while, the cockney narrators—in 'A View from a Hill,' and 'An Episode of Cathedral History,' among others—become an annoying mannerism."

"A View from a Hill" is referenced in the 1948 novel The Skeleton in the Clock by John Dickson Carr, which makes mention of "that grisly ghost story by M. R James, in which [...] glasses contain a fluid brewed from dead men's bones".

== Adaptations ==
"A View from a Hill" was adapted as the ninth TV movie in the BBC series A Ghost Story for Christmas. The film, the first one in the series to be produced since 1978, was first shown on UK television on December 23, 2005. It stars Mark Letheren as Fanshawe, Pip Torrens as Squire Richards, David Burke as Patten and Simon Linnell as Baxter. In the adaptation, Fanshawe and Squire Richards are not friends and there is never anything more than a business relationship between them. Fanshawe works for a museum and has been sent to Richards' home to catalogue the collection of historical artifacts which Richards inherited from his father. The impoverished Richards plans to sell off the collection. As a result of his unpleasant experiences, Fanshawe never finishes cataloguing the collection. Fanshawe is often attacked by invisible ghosts. At the film's climax, he is dragged to Gallows Hill and hanged. Fanshawe escapes death because a search party, led by Squire Richards and Patten, reaches him in time.
