= An Evening's Entertainment =

- Short story by M. R. James
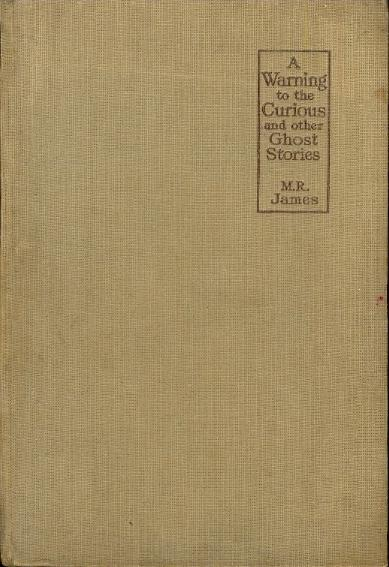
- "An Evening's Entertainment" was first published in A Warning to the Curious and Other Ghost Stories in 1925

Text available at Wikisource
- Country: England
- Language: English
- Genre: Horror short story

Publication
- Published in: A Warning to the Curious and Other Ghost Stories
- Publisher: Edward Arnold
- Media type: Print (hardback)
- Publication date: 1925

"An Evening's Entertainment" is a horror short story by the English writer M. R. James, first published in his book A Warning to the Curious and Other Ghost Stories in 1925, and collected in his book The Collected Ghost Stories of M. R. James in 1931. The story concerns the legacy of two men who become involved in sun worship and devil worship before meeting a grisly end. In 1964, it was adapted into a radio drama for The Black Mass.

== Plot summary ==
In the framing device for the story, a woman tells her grandchildren that if they sit quietly and avoid waking their father she will take them to pick blackberries the next day. After her grandson says that the best blackberries are to be found "in the little lane that goes up past Collins's cottage", she tells him he must never pick blackberries in that lane. When the children ask why not, she tells them a story which her mother had told her.

Long ago a man named Davis had lived in a cottage on the lane. Davis was independently wealthy, and did not associate with the other people of the parish. One day, a young man moved into his cottage; the relationship between the two being unclear. The two men are known to roam around the downland and woods late at night and early in the morning, and regularly visit a hill figure, camping there overnight during the summer. When the squire remarks that the hillside must be lonely during the night, the young man replies "we don't want for company at such times". Davis speculates that the barrows on the down predate Roman Britain.

Around three years later, a woodcutter finds the body of the young man hanging from an oak tree in a clearing deep in the woods, dressed in a white gown and with a bloody hatchet at his feet. When a party led by the parson go to retrieve the body, they find an old-looking "little ornament like a wheel" hanging on a chain round its neck. A boy is sent to Davis' cottage to notify him, but is found lying in the village street. When the horse on which the body is being transported nears Davis' cottage it rears with fear, throwing the body to the ground. When the party carry the young man's body into the cottage, they find Davis' body lying on a table bound with linen bands, with an axe wound in the chest which has split the sternum. Searching the house, they find sleeping potions in the cottage; it is surmised that the young man drugged and murdered Davis, then killed himself out of remorse. Papers found in the cottage suggest that the men were guilty of idolatry.

The residents of the parish are unwilling to have Davis and the young man given a christian burial in the consecrated ground of the churchyard; it is agreed to bury the two men at a crossroads. While the bodies are being transported, gouts of blood from Davis' body fall to the ground, leaving large, bloodstained patches on the lane. The next day, the squire rides past the lane and finds that the patches of blood are covered with large black flies. The squire orders that the patches be covered with clean earth from the churchyard. As the (consecrated) earth is thrown onto the blood, the flies disperse in a solid cloud, eliciting from the old sexton the remark "Lord of flies". The squire arranges for the cottage and its contents to be burned.

Following these events, people claim to see the ghosts of Davis and the young man in the wood and in the lane, particularly in the spring and autumn. One March evening, when the grandmother and her future husband have strayed inadvertently on to the lane while out courting, she is bitten on the back of her hand by a large black fly of an unusual kind, causing her hand and arm to swell up painfully. A "wise man" from a nearby village visits and cures her hand; remarking that "When the sun's gathering his strength [...] and when he's in the height of it, and when he's beginning to lose his hold, and when he's in his weakness, (Note: I.e. at the equinox and solstice) them that haunts about that lane had best to take heed to themselves." The grandmother hears of other people suffering similar incidents, but notes they are growing less frequent.

The story closes with the grandmother sending the children to bed, telling them "that's the reason [why] I won’t have you gathering me blackberries, no, nor eating them either, in that lane; and now you know all about it, I don’t fancy you'll want to yourself."

== Publication ==
"An Evening's Entertainment" was first published in James' 1925 book A Warning to the Curious and Other Ghost Stories. S. T. Joshi suggests it was written specifically to "flesh-out" the book. In 1931, it was collected in James' book The Collected Ghost Stories of M. R. James. In 2004, it was collected in The Wordsworth Book of Horror Stories.

== Reception ==
"An Evening's Entertainment" forms part of what critic Michael Kellermeyer describes as James' "puzzle-story phase," consisting of oblique tales that require an unusual amount of interpretation. S. T. Joshi observes that it is "one of the relatively few tales by [James] that do not involve an actual ghost", adding "...the tale, in spite of its almost flippant opening, carries powerful implications of horror under its seemingly bland surface." Jim Moon describes the story as an attempt to recreate "lost folklore". Rosemary Pardoe describes the story as "...an oddity in that it is the closest [James] ever came to straight-forward grand guignol."

Peter Bell describes it as "one of [James'] least favoured tales, perhaps because of its narrative structure [which] makes for a laboured beginning and a colloquial style", noting that it "may appear as too obscure for its own good, and certainly off-piste", but suggests that it "repays careful study", adding it is "an unusual foray by James into paganism".

Rosemary Pardoe notes that the story seemingly blends two strands of theology: the "revival of the Druidic worship of a pagan sun deity" and the "Judaeo-Christian demon Beelzebub". Pardoe suggests this may stem from a historic association between the Cerne Abbas Giant and the character "Beelzebub" in the Mummers' play.

Jane Mainley-Piddock writes "The protagonists in 'An Evening's Entertainment' offer a personification of this homosexual, Jungian pairing of a younger man, and an idealisation of an older man as teacher, lover, and father-figure" and that "It features a male relationship, which, while the relationship is not explicitly sexual, is surprising for the homophobic time and society in which James wrote it, especially as it appears to be both cross-age and cross-class."

== Adaptations ==
On 31 October 1964, Erik Bauersfeld's radio drama The Black Mass broadcast an adaptation of "An Evening's Entertainment" on KPFA and KPFK starring Pat Franklin as "Grandmother" and Donald Page as Mr. Davis.
