= A View from a Hill =

A View from a Hill may refer to:

- "A View from a Hill" (short story), a 1925 ghost story by M. R. James
- A View from a Hill (film), a short film, part of the British supernatural anthology series A Ghost Story for Christmas
