= The Black Mass =

1960s radio horror program

The Black Mass was an American horror-fantasy radio drama produced by and starring Erik Bauersfeld. The series aired on KPFA (Berkeley) and KPFK (Los Angeles) from 1963 to 1967, on an irregular schedule. Bauersfeld was also the Director of Drama and Literature at KPFA from 1966 to 1991.

Bauersfeld was the lead actor for The Black Mass, and the only actor in some episodes. The series featured adaptations of short stories -- mostly older classics but also some more contemporary pieces. The sound designer for most of the episodes was John Whiting, KPFA's production director. Their collaborations were later credited in a Ph.D. dissertation with "keeping radio drama alive in America in the 1960s."

Music for the series was by several Bay Area composers, including composer Charles Shere, also KPFA's Music Director.

Bauersfeld's Black Mass productions were an influence on writer-producer Thomas Lopez of ZBS Foundation, who noted, "In the 1960s, I was inspired by someone at KPFA in Berkeley, Eric Bauersfeld, who did a series called The Black Mass, adaptations of H. P. Lovecraft and such. He helped me a lot. I consider Eric my mentor. He also did some fine Eugene O'Neill plays for radio."

== Episodes ==
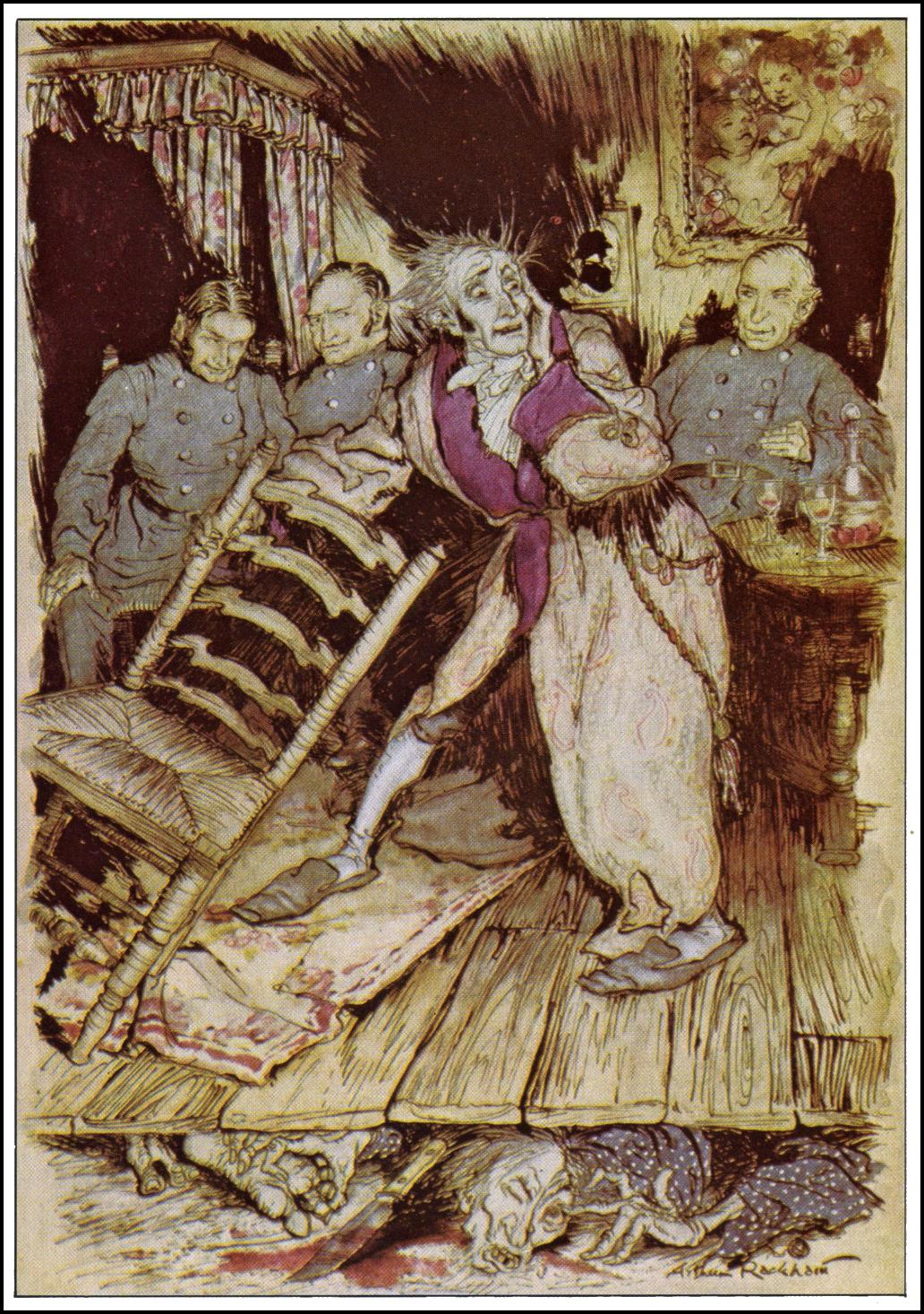
"The Tell-Tale Heart" by Edgar Allen Poe (illustrated here by Arthur Rackham for a 1935 publication) was adapted for The Black Mass.

Except as noted, these are in the Pacifica Radio Archives and on the Official Black Mass site:

- "The Flies" (by Anthony Vercoe)
- "O Mirror, Mirror" (by Nigel Kneale) and "Shiddah and Kuziba" (by Isaac Bashevis Singer)
- "Evening Primrose" (adaptation of John Collier's short story)
- "An Evening's Entertainment" (by M. R. James)
- Two by Edgar Allan Poe: "A Predicament" and "The Tell-Tale Heart"
- "Nightmare" (by Alan Wykes)
- "A Haunted House" (by Virginia Woolf)
- "Bartleby, the Scrivener" (by Herman Melville)
- "A Country Doctor" (by Franz Kafka)
- "The Ash Tree" (by M. R. James)
- "Atrophy" (by J. Anthony West)
- "The Judgment" (by Franz Kafka)
- "Oil of Dog" (by Ambrose Bierce) and "Esmé" (by Saki)
- "The Jolly Corner" (by Henry James)
- "Diary of a Madman" (by Nikolai Gogol)
- "Legend of the Island of Falles" (by Betty Sandbrook) ("lost" episode")
- "All Hallows" (by Walter de la Mare)
- "The Dream of a Ridiculous Man" (by Fyodor Dostoyevsky)
- "The Death of Halpin Frayser" by (Ambrose Bierce)
- "Moonlit Road" (by Ambrose Bierce)
- Two by Poe - "The Man of the Crowd" and "MS. Found in a Bottle"
- Six Tales by Lord Dunsany
- "The Outsider" (by H. P. Lovecraft)
- "Proof Positive" (by Graham Greene) and "Witch of the Willows" (by Lord Dunsany)
- "The Renegade" (by Albert Camus) ("lost" episode)
- "The Squaw" (by Bram Stoker)
- "The Rats in the Walls" (by H. P. Lovecraft)

The following are listed from KPFA, KPFK or KQED airchecks, not the Pacifica Archives: Great American Scream - KPFK:

- "The Boarded Window" by Ambrose Bierce
- "A Haunted House" by Virginia Woolf
- "The Feeder" by Earl Linder
- "The Imp of the Perverse" (by Poe from KQED, San Francisco [15"])

== Releases of Black Mass episodes ==
- Dream of a Ridiculous Man - Pacifica Radio Archive #BB5499 36:00 This tape has no opening, closing or credits; an older copy is listed as 37:40. A cast of six is listed on the label. With sound effects and original music by Ian Underwood, the show aired 1/29/67.
- Erik Bauersfeld's dramatic adaptations of Lovecraft's "The Rats in the Walls" and "The Outsider" were released in the 1970s on an unauthorized limited LP pressing of 1,000 copies.

== Listen to ==
- episodes of The Black Mass on RadioEchoes.com
