= A Warning to the Curious and Other Ghost Stories =

Fourth and final collection of ghost stories by M.R. James

- First edition
- Author: M. R. James
- Language: English
- Genre: Horror short stories
- Publisher: Edward Arnold
- Publication date: 1925
- Publication place: United Kingdom
- Media type: Print (hardback)
- Preceded by: A Thin Ghost and Others
- Followed by: The Collected Ghost Stories of M. R. James

A Warning to the Curious and Other Ghost Stories is the title of M. R. James' fourth and final collection of ghost stories, published in 1925.

Montague Rhodes James (1862–1936) was a medievalist scholar; Provost of King's College, Cambridge. He wrote many of his ghost stories to be read aloud in the long tradition of spooky Christmas Eve tales. His stories often use rural settings, with a quiet, scholarly protagonist getting caught up in the activities of supernatural forces. The details of horror are almost never explicit, the stories relying on a gentle, bucolic background to emphasise the awfulness of the otherworldly intrusions.

== Contents of the original edition ==
- "The Haunted Doll's House"
- "The Uncommon Prayer-Book"
- "A Neighbour's Landmark"
- "A View from a Hill"
- "A Warning to the Curious"
- "An Evening's Entertainment"

== Sources ==
- "M.R. James: free web books, online". Archived from the original on 30 September 2009.
