= Bib Fortuna =

Character in Star Wars

- Star Wars character
- Michael Carter as Bib Fortuna in Return of the Jedi (1983)
- First appearance: Return of the Jedi (1983)
- Last appearance: "Chapter 16: The Rescue" (2020) (The Mandalorian)
- Created by: Lawrence Kasdan; George Lucas; Elliot Taylor; Phil Tippett; Nilo Rodis-Jamero; Ralph McQuarrie
- Portrayed by: Michael Carter (Episode VI); Matthew Wood (Episode I, The Mandalorian, The Book of Boba Fett); Alan Ruscoe (Episode I, deleted scene)
- Voiced by: Erik Bauersfeld (Episode VI); Other: David Dukes (Return of the Jedi radio drama); Matthew Wood (Smugglers Habit radio drama, The Mandalorian, The Bad Batch)

In-universe information
- Species: Twi'lek
- Gender: Male
- Occupation: Daimyo; Majordomo; Chief aide to Jabba the Hutt
- Affiliation: Jabba the Hutt
- Relatives: Beezer Fortuna (cousin)
- Homeworld: Ryloth

Bib Fortuna is a fictional character in the Star Wars franchise. The Twi'lek majordomo and chief aide of the crime lord Jabba the Hutt, Bib is Jabba's closest associate, succeeding him as daimyo after his death before ultimately being killed himself by Boba Fett. Fortuna first appeared in Return of the Jedi (1983), the final entry in the original Star Wars trilogy. He also appeared briefly in the prequel trilogy film The Phantom Menace (1999) and in the second season of Disney+ series The Mandalorian (2020) and The Bad Batch (2021). The character has also appeared in other Star Wars media, including novels, comic books, video games, and radio dramas.

Fortuna was created by Return of the Jedi co-writers Lawrence Kasdan and George Lucas, and was designed by Phil Tippett based upon early sketches by concept artists Nilo Rodis-Jamero and Ralph McQuarrie. The character was portrayed by Michael Carter in Return of the Jedi, who was cast based upon his stage acting experience; the actor did not know it was a Star Wars film until after he accepted the role. Erik Bauersfeld provided the voice of Fortuna in Return of the Jedi, and sound editor Matthew Wood portrayed the character in The Phantom Menace and The Mandalorian.

Although few details about him were revealed in his film appearances, other Star Wars works have established Fortuna's back story, including his past as a slave trader who was sentenced to death on his home planet of Ryloth. Although he outwardly appears loyal and obedient to Jabba, Fortuna secretly despises his master and actively plots to assassinate him and take over his criminal operation. Fortuna survives the events of Return of the Jedi in the Star Wars Legends canon, which encompasses all licensed Star Wars stories outside of the films prior to The Walt Disney Company acquiring the franchise in 2012. The new set of official canon created after that acquisition also establishes that Fortuna was not killed during the climactic battle in Return of the Jedi, and he assumed Jabba's place as crime lord until being killed and succeeded by Boba Fett five years later.

It took about eight-and-a-half hours to apply the character's makeup for the first time in Return of the Jedi, which included extensive casts and molds, a large rubber headpiece, day glow orange contact lenses, sharpened false teeth, and claw-like finger extensions. Fortuna has been described as a fan-favorite and one of the most memorable characters from Star Wars, and has been included on several lists of the best characters in the franchise. Several toys and merchandise works have been created for the character, and an original action figure prototype sold for £36,000 in a 2019 auction.

== Character biography ==
=== Backstory ===
Bib Fortuna is a member of the Twi'lek species, humanoids distinguished by the pair of long tentacular appendages that protrude from the back of their heads, which are known as lekku. Fortuna is the first Twi'lek character to appear in Star Wars, although the species did not receive a name until the publication of the Star Wars Sourcebook, a 1987 sourcebook for Star Wars: The Roleplaying Game. With pale, mucus-covered skin and sharp, snaggly teeth, Fortuna is originally from the planet Ryloth, the Twi'lek homeworld. Fortuna works as the majordomo and chief aide for Jabba the Hutt, a slug-like alien and one of the most powerful crime lords in the galaxy. In this capacity, Fortuna controls most operations within Jabba's palace on the desert planet of Tatooine. Among these duties are welcoming visitors who come to the palace, and vetting them before they appear before Jabba. Fortuna's dialogue in the film is delivered in Huttese, the fictional language also spoken by Jabba.

Outside of the films, Bib Fortuna's back story was established through media in the Star Wars Expanded Universe, which encompasses all licensed stories in the Star Wars universe outside of the nine main feature films, such as novels, comic books, video games, and television shows. With the 2012 acquisition of Lucasfilm by The Walt Disney Company, most of the licensed Star Wars novels and comics produced since the originating 1977 film were rebranded as Star Wars Legends and declared non-canon to the franchise in April 2014. As a result, storylines and character histories established for Fortuna before April 2014 are part of the Legends canon, but not the Disney canon.

In his back story established by the Expanded Universe, Bib Fortuna is born into a family engaged in the Outer Rim portion of the galaxy. He grows wealthy as a slave trader before working for Jabba the Hutt, selling fellow members of his own species into servitude. Fortuna is also a smuggler of an illicit substance called spice, and is one of the first to widely sell a highly addictive drug called ryll from Ryloth to other planets. This brings Ryloth to the attention of the Galactic Empire, and leads to a planetwide breakdown of order. Fortuna becomes infamous as a result, and is sentenced to death on his home planet, but he escapes and flees to the planet Tatooine. There he becomes the head of Jabba the Hutt's smuggling operations for a drug called glitterstim, the first in a series of successively more prominent positions that eventually leads him to becoming Jabba's majordomo. Fortuna later returns to Ryloth with an army of Jabba's henchmen to enact revenge for his death sentence, burning seven of the planet's cities and capturing slaves and riches for Jabba. Fortuna harbors ambitions of one day returning to Ryloth and ruling the planet.

Other Star Wars books and media have established that Fortuna is responsible for the presence of several of the creatures and characters in Jabba's palace during Return of the Jedi. For example, the rancor that Jabba keeps underneath a trap door in his throne room was originally presented to him by Fortuna as a birthday gift. Fortuna kidnaps Oola, the green-skinned Twi'lek female who appears in scenes in Return of the Jedi as a slave and dancer for Jabba. After abducting her, Fortuna arranged for her to be trained in exotic dancing and told her stories about Jabba's palace that falsely portrayed it as a glamorous and exciting place, making Oola so eager to be there that she rejected opportunities to escape. Fortuna also originally captured Salacious B. Crumb, a small creature that sat beside Jabba's tail on his throne and served as a court jester in the palace. Crumb was a stowaway thief aboard Jabba's ship when Fortuna captured him and presented him to Jabba before the events of the film.

=== Return of the Jedi ===
Bib Fortuna makes his first appearance in Return of the Jedi (1983), the final film in the original Star Wars trilogy. The film begins with Han Solo, one of the protagonists of the Star Wars franchise, being held captive by Jabba the Hutt and frozen in a slab of metal substance called carbonite. Bib Fortuna is first seen in the film when he greets the droids C-3PO and R2-D2, who enter the palace to deliver a message to Jabba. Fortuna greets them coldly at first, but becomes intrigued upon learning they have a gift for the Hutt. He attempts to obtain more information about the gift, but the droids insist their instructions are to give it only to Jabba himself. Fortuna brings the droids before Jabba, where they deliver a holographic message from the Jedi Knight Luke Skywalker seeking to bargain for the release of Han Solo. Fortuna whispers advice into Jabba's ear and feeds him information as Jabba sits on his throne. He is later present with Jabba when Princess Leia Organa, who infiltrated the palace by disguising herself as a bounty hunter named Boushh, is captured while freeing Han Solo from carbonite.

Jabba gives orders to Fortuna that Luke Skywalker is not to be admitted to the palace. When Skywalker later arrived, Fortuna is among the first to intercept him and initially forbids him from speaking to Jabba. However, Luke uses the Force to influence Fortuna's mind, convincing him to take Skywalker before Jabba. When Jabba realizes Skywalker used a "Jedi mind trick" on Fortuna, he angrily scolds Fortuna, calls him a "weak-minded fool", and throws him off the throne room dais. Fortuna later travels with Jabba aboard the Hutt's sail barge to the planned executions of Skywalker, Solo, and Solo's first mate Chewbacca at the Great Pit of Carkoon, where they are to be fed to a creature called a sarlacc. A skirmish breaks out between Skywalker and his friends and Jabba's thugs, resulting in the death of Jabba and the destruction of the sail barge. Fortuna's fate after these events is left ambiguous in the film.

In the Expanded Universe/Star Wars Legends continuity, Fortuna survives the battle, escaping before the sail barge's destruction and returning to Jabba's palace to attempt to take over his criminal enterprise. His fate in the official canon is similar.

=== The Phantom Menace ===
Bib Fortuna appears briefly in The Phantom Menace (1999), the first film in the Star Wars prequel trilogy. He stands alongside Jabba the Hutt during the podrace, from which a young Anakin Skywalker emerges victorious. At one point, Fortuna wakes up Jabba after the Hutt crime lord falls asleep during the podrace. Since The Phantom Menace was set 32 years before the events of the first Star Wars film, Fortuna's presence establishes that he has been employed by Jabba the Hutt for more than three decades, dating back to the final years of the Galactic Republic.

=== The Mandalorian ===
In a post-credits scene of the second-season finale "Chapter 16: The Rescue" of The Mandalorian, a corpulent Bib Fortuna is depicted as the new owner of Jabba's palace. During this time as owner he has put his own mark on the palace, added his own humanoid throne upon Jabba's old plinth, taken up having his own slave girl and indulged in eating fine foods and putting on weight. He is killed by Boba Fett, who takes his throne. In The Book of Boba Fett episode "Chapter 4: The Gathering Storm", Bib Fortuna's death at Boba Fett's hand is briefly shown again via archive footage from "Chapter 16: The Rescue".

=== Other Star Wars media ===
==== Legends canon ====
One of Bib Fortuna's first non-film appearances is in "A Rancor Comes to Tatooine", a short story included in The Star Wars Sourcebook (1987). The story describes the rivalry between Fortuna and a Corellian named Bidlo Kwerve, both of whom are competing to become Jabba the Hutt's majordomo in a period prior to Return of the Jedi. Kwerve and Fortuna acquire the rancor as a birthday gift for Jabba, and Fortuna earns the majordomo job, while Kwerve is ultimately eaten by the rancor. This storyline is expanded upon in Tales from Jabba's Palace, a 1995 anthology book written from the perspectives of multiple background characters in the Jabba's palace scenes of Return of the Jedi. In the book, after Jabba receives the rancor gift, he offers Fortuna and Kwerve a choice of two rewards: one can become his majordomo, while the other will receive an unspecified "greater honor". Sensing a trap, Fortuna accepts the majordomo position, thus saving his own life and ensuring Kwerve's death when the greater honor turns out to be the distinction of being the first person Jabba feeds to his new rancor.

Fortuna appears in several of the stories in Tales from Jabba's Palace, and the book establishes that Fortuna despises Jabba and is actively plotting to assassinate the Hutt, steal his wealth, and take over his criminal operation. It also establishes Fortuna's personality as cunning and calculating, and that Fortuna's deferential attitude toward his employer is a facade. Fortuna's back story is particularly expanded upon in the short story "Of the Day's Annoyances: Bib Fortuna's Tale", by M. Shayne Bell. In that story, Fortuna protects his friend Nat Secura, whom Jabba wants to kill by feeding him to the rancor. Secura is the last descendant of a great Twi'lek house, and Fortuna uses Secura's power to sell other Twi'leks into slavery. To protect Secura, Fortuna seeks assistance from his allies, the mysterious B'omarr monks, religious beings that have transplanted their brains into nutrient-filled jars attached to spider-like droid walkers. Fortuna has the monks remove Secura's brain shortly before Secura's body, under Jabba's orders, is thrown to the rancor and eaten. When Jabba is later killed on his sail barge by Princess Leia at the Great Pit of Carkoon, Fortuna watches the Hutt die and does nothing to prevent it. Fortuna then flees on his private skiff and returns to Jabba's palace, where he expects to take over the criminal operation. There, however, the monks decide the best fate for Fortuna is for his own brain to be transferred into one of their droid walkers, and they remove and transfer his brain against his will.

Fortuna appears in his disembodied droid walker form in a four-issue arc of the Star Wars: X-wing Rogue Squadron comic book entitled Battleground: Tatooine (1996). In it, he is the captive of Firith Olan, a fellow Twi-lek criminal who Fortuna had called to Tatooine prior to the death of Jabba the Hutt. Upon arriving and finding Fortuna's brain trapped in a droid walker, Olan begins operating his own criminal enterprise out of Jabba's palace, taking delight in mocking and torturing the helpless Fortuna. After Olan becomes injured, Fortuna has his own consciousness transferred into Olan's body, leaving Olan's brain now trapped within the droid. Afterward, Fortuna resumes his life of crime. Fortuna is also one of the main characters in the comic book Star Wars: Jabba the Hutt: Betrayal (1996), which is set before Return of the Jedi. In the comic, Fortuna plots a revolt among Jabba's slaves, with the intention of capturing Jabba and taking over his criminal enterprise. The plot fails when it is interrupted by a separate assassination attempt against Jabba. One of Fortuna's co-conspirators, a red-skinned alien named Nivek, nearly gives Fortuna's plot away in front of Jabba, but Fortuna shoots him in the head to silence him.

Fortuna appears in the 2000 video game Star Wars: Demolition, in which the player participates in vehicular combat contests at the behest of Jabba the Hutt. Fortuna can be seen in the menu screen describing the various terrains the player could choose for the battles. Fortuna is a playable character in the video games Lego Star Wars II: The Original Trilogy (2006) and Lego Star Wars: The Complete Saga (2007). He also appears in the webcomic Star Wars: The Clone Wars: The Valsedian Operation, which was first published between 2010 and 2011. In the comic, a group of Jedi including Anakin Skywalker, Obi-Wan Kenobi, and Ahsoka Tano investigate an illegal mining operation using slave labor in the Valsedian asteroid belt. The Jedi are informed of it by Jabba the Hutt, who believes his distant cousin Torpo is running the operation. However, upon investigation, the Jedi learn that the venture is secretly masterminded by Bib Fortuna. Fortuna plays a supporting role in Smuggler's Gambit, a radio drama recorded live at Star Wars Celebration VI in Orlando, Florida in August 2012. The story follows Han Solo, Chewbacca, and Princess Leia searching for a location for a new Rebel base following the events of the first Star Wars film. After Solo and Chewbacca are captured and placed on sale at an auction, Fortuna attempts to buy them on behalf of Jabba the Hutt, entering into a bidding war with Prince Xizor of the Black Sun criminal organization.

==== Official canon ====
Fortuna appears in the mobile strategy game Star Wars Commander (2014), in which he becomes involved in a conflict with a mercenary named Saponza. After Saponza kills multiple henchmen of Jabba the Hutt who had interfered with his property on Tatooine, Fortuna arranges for Saponza's home to be burned down. Fortuna makes a brief appearance in the first issue of the Star Wars: Darth Vader comic book series, released by Marvel Comics in February 2015. In the comic, Darth Vader forcibly enters Jabba's palace to meet with the Hutt, and Fortuna briefly tries to stop him, but becomes frightened and allows him to pass after Vader threatens him with his lightsaber. The scene mirrors that of Fortuna confronting Luke Skywalker as he enters the palace in Return of the Jedi, but establishes a direct contrast between Luke's non-aggressive behavior toward Fortuna and Vader's more threatening manner.

Fortuna gets his own anthology story written by Kwame Mbalia in the 2023 book From a Certain Point of View: Return of the Jedi. The story, titled Fortuna Favors the Bold, reveals that Fortuna had plotted to overthrow Jabba during the events of Return of the Jedi.

A Twi'lek character named Beezer Fortuna, a cousin of Bib Fortuna, appears in the Star Wars anthology film Rogue One (2016), which is set shortly before the events of the first Star Wars film. Beezer's look is based upon preliminary sketches of Bib Fortuna from Return of the Jedi. His nickname among Rogue One's crew during production was "Cousin Bib", so Lucasfilm executive Pablo Hidalgo made their familial connection official while writing Beezer's back story. The character's first name derives from the "High Beeser of Hoth", a title belonging to Bib Fortuna in early Return of the Jedi drafts, but which was ultimately abandoned in later versions. In Rogue One, Beezer is one of the chief strategists of an extremist rebel faction led by Saw Gerrera, and he can be seen in the group's hideout on the planet Jedha. According to Beezer's back story, he resents his family's participation in the criminal underworld, and is more politically minded than his other relatives. The actor who portrayed Beezer Fortuna was fitted with contact lenses to make him more closely resemble Bib Fortuna.

== Characterization ==
Outwardly, Bib Fortuna appears very loyal and obedient to Jabba the Hutt, hardly ever leaving his side, and regularly supplying him with advice and counsel. He demonstrates tremendous patience when dealing with Jabba's bad habits, enduring his mood swings, and occasionally violent outbursts. Fortuna also employs this patience while dealing with Jabba's visitors, who range from drunken thugs to overbearing emissaries. However, Star Wars media and works outside of the films have established that Fortuna's obedience and good manners toward Jabba are almost entirely an act, and that internally he serves his own interests and actively plots against his employer. In reality, Fortuna feels a deep contempt for Jabba, as he reveals to his co-conspirators during a plot to kidnap and eventually assassinate the Hutt in the 1996 comic book Star Wars: Jabba the Hutt: Betrayal:

Hate? What a tiny, insignificant, useless word. What I feel for Jabba can only be expressed by causing every nerve in his body to experience the greatest possible pain for the longest possible time. Every moment I spend in his company is an eternity of loathing. The overpowering stench that pours from his open mouth, the sight of his thick, greasy, pustule-covered flesh. His unspeakable acts of depravity... he is the most revolting monster in the galaxy!

Fortuna is a powerful and dreaded individual in the galaxy's underground community, though also somewhat cowardly, and has a large capacity for cruelty and violence. His sadism is on display in Return of the Jedi, where he looks forward to seeing Luke Skywalker and his friends get fed to the sarlacc. Fortuna has a very vindictive personality, demonstrated by his attack against his home planet of Ryloth as an act of revenge for the death sentence he previously received there. He often resorts to underhanded means to achieve his objectives, acting out against friends and foes alike. This was exemplified by his willingness to kill one of his allies, the alien Nivek in Jabba the Hutt: Betrayal, when he risked exposing Fortuna's plot to assassinate Jabba. Fortuna is cunning and manipulative, illustrated by the way in which he presents himself to Jabba as meek and passive in order to achieve his goals. However, Skywalker's use of the Force to influence his mind in Return of the Jedi indicates Fortuna lacks a strong will, as Jedi mind tricks are more effective against weak-minded and susceptible individuals. Michael Carter, the actor who portrayed Bib Fortuna in Return of the Jedi, said he found the character "stupid in an endearing way" and "quite innocent, yet quite scary", and believed he could have led a good life if he had been raised in a different place.

== Concept and creation ==
=== Conception ===
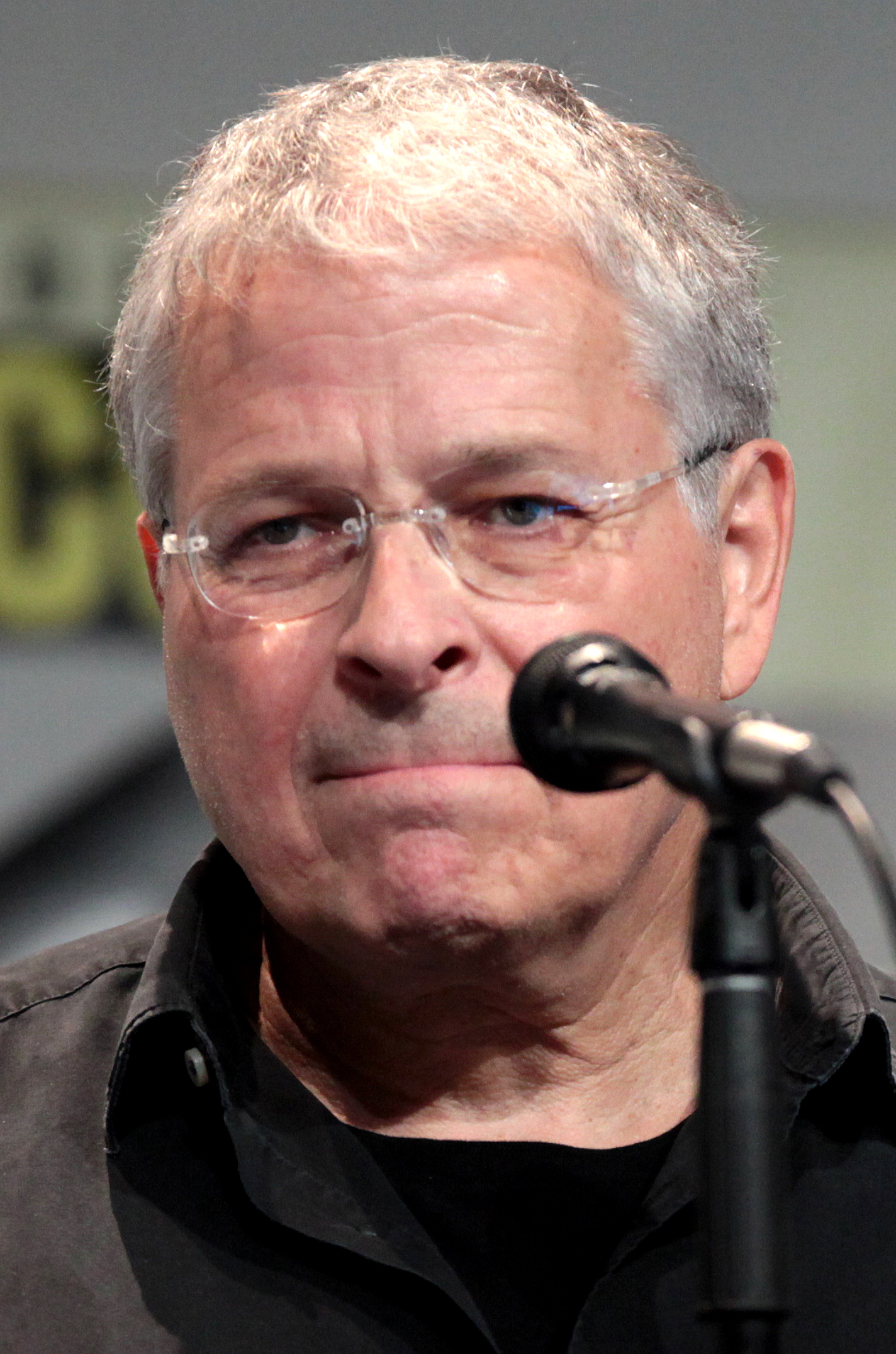
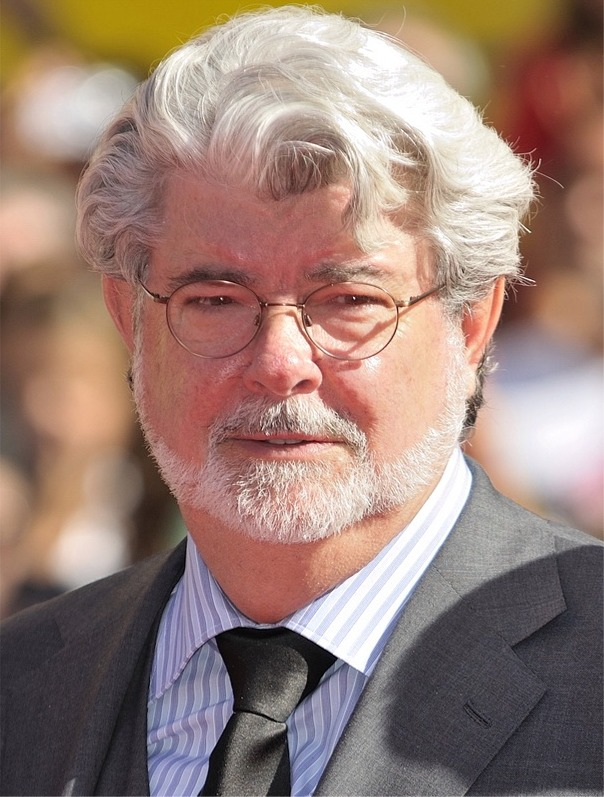
Lawrence Kasdan (left) and George Lucas (right) created Bib Fortuna in the screenplay of Return of the Jedi.

Bib Fortuna was created by Lawrence Kasdan and George Lucas, co-writers of the Return of the Jedi screenplay. In early drafts of the script, Fortuna was referred to by the title "High Beeser of Hoth", a reference to the planet Hoth, the ice planet that served as the home of a secret Rebel base in the Star Wars film The Empire Strikes Back. Initially, the Return of the Jedi screenplay did not specify that Fortuna belonged to an alien species, but he was described in the final script as "a humanlike alien with long tentacles protruding from his skull".

Fortuna was designed by Phil Tippett, the visual effects artist who designed most of the creatures for Return of the Jedi. Early sketches of the character were drawn by concept artists Nilo Rodis-Jamero, and Ralph McQuarrie. Several of these sketches looked very different from Fortuna as he appeared in the final film. For example, one of Rodis-Jamero's sketches portrayed Fortuna with a thin, cylindrical head with gills along the sides, and another with a flat-topped, triangularly-shaped head. Those discarded sketches served as the basis for another Star Wars species called the Adnerem, which appear in the Star Wars: The Roleplaying Game and other later works. Other variations by Rodis-Jamero presented Fortuna in blue, priest-like robes, occasionally holding a sceptre, with a lined, elongated face and narrow slits for eyes and nostrils.

McQuarrie's early sketches of Bib Fortuna were, in his words, "more human" than the final design. He drew several versions with a variety of alien faces, as well as various costume elements like a tall top hat, and silver snow goggles, the latter of which George Lucas particularly enjoyed. McQuarrie said his early Bib Fortuna sketches were among his favorite renderings from the entire Star Wars trilogy, though he said the final version was better and "weirder" than his early designs. One of Rodis-Jamero's concepts was the one ultimately selected, and maquettes of the character were created by "Monster Shop" of Industrial Light & Magic, the motion picture visual effects company founded by Lucas.

=== Costume and makeup ===
Bib Fortuna's costume in Return of the Jedi was designed by Rodis-Jamero and Aggie Guerard Rodgers, and Nick Dudman worked as a makeup artist on the character. Fortuna involved the first prosthetic makeup Dudman worked upon. Michael Carter, the actor who portrayed Fortuna, spent three months undergoing extensive makeup casts and tests for the character at Elstree Studios before shooting began. Molds were made from his hands and head. Several foam appliances were sculpted to conform to Carter's face, and molds were made and cast into foam latex, which were then trimmed and carefully glued to the actor's face. It took about eight-and-a-half hours to apply the makeup to Carter the first time, though the process was eventually reduced to slightly under an hour. Carter had been told a great deal of makeup would be involved with the part, but he said, "I did not know what I was letting myself in for when it came to having to wear so much makeup. It did come as a bit of a shock."

Carter wore a large rubber headpiece, which included two large, slug-like tentacles that twisted around his neck. Each tentacle was five feet long and draped ornamentally around Fortuna's shoulders. The headpiece included a large waddle dangling underneath his chin, and large bulges above each of his eyes, which were intended to be sensory brain areas. An intricate set of "air bladders", or foam and latex bubbles, were fitted onto Carter's temples and brows and inflated via hoses operated off-screen to give the impression of pulsation. Once the headpiece was placed on, Carter had to wear it for the remainder of the shooting day, which was often difficult for the actor. During one day, Carter had an itch for six hours that became so uncomfortable that Dudman split the headpiece down the middle so Carter could scratch it. After that point, the headpiece was specifically designed so it could be opened up the middle. As Carter sweated due to the heat under the costume, the makeup would start to come loose and the glue would dissolve, requiring it to be constantly reapplied.

Carter wore dayglow orange contact lenses, which created a glowing effect for the character's eyes, something specifically requested by director Richard Marquand. Carter felt they gave Bib Fortuna "a feminine look". They were hard contact lenses, which covered the entire surface of Carter's eyeballs, except for holes drilled through the middles. This gave him tunnel vision and severely limited his ability to see, and he kept accidentally walking into parts of the set as a result. An optician was available for Carter at all times during filming to apply the lenses. Carter said the contacts were made in "too much of a rush" and were too small, so he suffered abrasions of the cornea, slightly hindering his vision until about a week after filming ended. Carter also wore sharp, pointed teeth, which were filed down to create what Tippett called a "ghastly focal point" for his dialogue scenes. The teeth would occasionally slip out of Carter's mouth during shooting, at times striking against actors or crew members around him. The teeth made it difficult for the actor to speak, and he had to strongly articulate Fortuna's lines to make the lip-movement look appropriate.

The costume consisted of a three-layer velveteen overcoat over a turquoise faille gown, with knee-high boots custom made by London shoemaker Anello & Davide. The shoes were soft-soled, and meant to allow for silent movement. Carter wore lifts on his feet to make himself taller, and props inside his costume made his arms appear longer. Claws were placed on his fingertips, fitted through fingerless gloves that Tippett said gave Fortuna "a spidery reach". Carter said the makeup had "an immediate effect" and once it was fully applied he would "kind of meditate it for a moment" because it ultimately helped dictate his performance. However, he also said the large amount of makeup made acting more difficult, adding: "I was a big pile of moving rubber. And when I wasn't moving, I was like a piece of furniture." Due to strict security measures to prevent secrets of the film being leaked to the public, whenever Carter was brought outside to be moved to and from the set at Elstree Studios, he was covered with a dustbin liner so he would not be seen. Carter would stand very still between takes to avoid disrupting the makeup, and occasionally crew members, seeing him standing among the various puppets and alien props, would believe he was a prop and attempt to lift him.

Makeup artist Shaune Harrison worked on the Bib Fortuna character in The Phantom Menace, as well as several other creatures and aliens in the film, including Jar Jar Binks.

=== Filming ===
It took five weeks to film Bib Fortuna's scenes for Return of the Jedi. Michael Carter initially received little information about the character except that he was "an alien, and not a very nice one". Due to the secrecy surrounding the film, Carter was only given the script pages that included his specific scenes. He got them about four days before filming began, with all dialogue and information about other characters redacted. Since Fortuna's dialogue was in an alien language, and since he had little knowledge about the rest of the film, Carter did not know anything about the storyline of Return of the Jedi during the filming process. In order to realistically deliver dialogue in a fictional language, Carter would make up his own meaning for the words he was speaking, which made it easier for him to find the correct vocal delivery and facial expressions for the performance.

Carter was present from the very first day of shooting on January 11, 1982, which marked the final costume test on Stage 6 of Elstree Studios, in the set for the corridor of Jabba's palace. The scenes in which Bib Fortuna and Luke Skywalker meet at the palace entrance were filmed on January 12 and 13. During filming for Bib Fortuna's first chronological appearance in the film, when he first meets R2-D2 and C-3PO, Carter could not see the mark on the ground where he was supposed to stop due to the limited visibility caused by his contact lenses. As a result, the crew set up a 2-by-4 piece of wood on the ground for him to stop his feet against. During the first take of the shot, Carter tripped over the board and fell. During another scene, Bib Fortuna lifts a captured Princess Leia and pushes her toward Jabba the Hutt, so he can lick her. While filming the scene, Carter misjudged actress Carrie Fisher's weight, and lifted her so quickly that he nearly pushed her straight into the mouth of the Jabba puppet, causing her to scream.

Several scenes involving Fortuna were cut from Return of the Jedi, including one in which Salacious B. Crumb, the small creature that sits at the tail of Jabba the Hutt, vomits into Fortuna's beverage. In another cut scene, Fortuna engages in a provocative dance with Jess, one of Jabba's dancers, who was portrayed by Amanda Noar. George Lucas eliminated the scene because he felt it was inappropriate for children. Another cut scene involved a longer exchange between Luke Skywalker and Fortuna after Skywalker first appeared at Jabba's palace. In the original scene, the two had a long period of dialogue while walking down the corridor, with both actors speaking the fictional language of Huttese. During one take, Carter had to shout at Skywalker, and his false teeth accidentally came out and hit actor Mark Hamill's face. The scene was ultimately cut and a shorter scene with Fortuna and Skywalker speaking in a stairway was used instead. During filming, both actors spoke in English, but Fortuna's dialogue was dubbed in Huttese later.

== Portrayals ==
=== Michael Carter ===
I liked Bib, I enjoyed playing him. He was stupid in an endearing way – quite innocent, yet quite scary. I thought maybe, if he'd been brought up in another place, he might have turned out to be a rather sweet bloke.

— Michael Carter

The role of Bib Fortuna was cast very early in the production process for Return of the Jedi because makeup artist Stuart Freeborn wanted to get started on creating the character's look as quickly as possible. Michael Carter came to the attention of Return of the Jedi casting director Mary Selway, who saw him perform in a musical in the West End theatre section of London in the early 1980s. Director Richard Marquand had also seen and enjoyed Carter's theater work, and wanted to cast him as Fortuna; Marquand described him as a "terrific actor". He was also drawn to Carter for the role because he wanted Fortuna to be very tall, and Carter was about six feet tall.

Marquand invited Carter to meet at a studio in Elstree Studios to discuss a role he was casting in a film, which Marquand would only identify by its fake working title Blue Harvest. Carter was performing on a television series at the time. Carter's train was late and Marquand was in a meeting when he arrived, and the front desk forgot to inform Marquand that he arrived, so Carter waited for an hour without being called in. Marquand happened upon Carter as he was leaving for the day, and the meeting took place. During the 30-minute meeting, Marquand informed him the part was an alien in a science-fiction film, also describing it as a children's film, and that Carter could have the role without auditioning if he wanted it, but Marquand could not discuss any details about the character or film because it was a "top secret Hollywood movie". Carter was initially not sure the part interested him, but Marquand persisted, and Carter reluctantly agreed. Only then did Marquand reveal that it was a Star Wars film. Carter was sworn to secrecy about the role, but he told his family about the part anyway, and the next day his daughter discussed it publicly with a friend at her school.

Carter had never seen the original Star Wars film, and had only seen the sequel, The Empire Strikes Back, because he was working at the time in a theater production with Anthony Daniels, who played C-3PO in the film. Following his appearance in Return of the Jedi, Carter was offered several alien roles or parts that involved heavy amounts of prosthetics. For example, he was cast in the role of Radu Molasar, a monster and warlord in the Michael Mann film The Keep (1983), as a direct result of his work in Return of the Jedi. Carter received letters and autograph requests from Star Wars fans for decades after the film's release, and has made appearances at sci-fi and fantasy conventions. Carter was offered the opportunity to reprise the role of Bib Fortuna in the prequel The Phantom Menace, but he declined due to the rigors associated with the makeup application.

=== Erik Bauersfeld ===
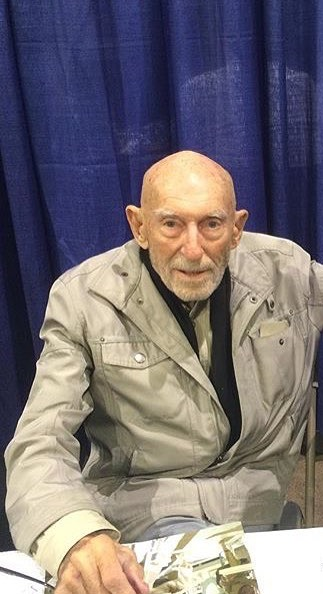
Erik Bauersfeld, pictured here in 2015, provided the voice of Bib Fortuna in Return of the Jedi.

The voice of Bib Fortuna in Return of the Jedi was performed by Erik Bauersfeld, a radio dramatist who also voiced the alien character Admiral Ackbar in the film, and had unsuccessfully auditioned to voice Yoda in The Empire Strikes Back. He was cast after Star Wars sound designer Ben Burtt approached him in 1983, while Bauersfeld was producing a radio drama with Lucasfilm sound designer Randy Thom and suggested he audition for the part of Ackbar. The recording session for Fortuna's dialogue took about 30 minutes, and Bauersfeld made up the voice on the spot after looking at a photograph of Fortuna, without having any other information about the character. Since Fortuna spoke in the Huttese alien language, Bauersfeld had no idea what the character was saying when he recited the lines. He said of the process: "Ben (Burtt) gave me a general idea and I just did it."

Bauersfeld did not receive an on-screen credit for his roles as Fortuna or Ackbar, and his association with the characters was unknown for years after the film was released. Michael Carter did not know another actor's voice was used, as late as 2004 he believed it was his own voice, saying in an interview: "It sounded like my voice." Eventually fans learned Bauersfeld played the parts and he began to receive multiple fan letters every week, which continued for the rest of his life. Bauersfeld said he appreciated the passion of fans and responded to every autograph request, but that he was not particularly knowledgeable about Star Wars himself; in a 2011 interview, he said he had not seen Return of the Jedi since it first came out, still had not seen the first Star Wars film, and knew no details about Fortuna, asking the interviewer: "He was the bad guy, wasn't he?"

=== Matthew Wood ===
Matthew Wood, a sound editor who has worked on multiple Star Wars films, portrayed Fortuna in the podrace scenes in The Phantom Menace, which marked his first acting role. Wood has also provided the voices of General Grievous, Ello Asty, battle droids, and various other minor Star Wars characters. Wood was offered the part after George Lucas saw him in a doorway during a meeting and felt he looked right for the part. According to Wood, Lucas told him, "You're kind of skinny and creepy" before offering him the part and sending him to wardrobe to be fitted with prosthetics.

Although in the scene Fortuna appears alongside Jabba and several other characters inside a private booth, Wood was alone when his scenes were filmed, and his footage was digitally combined with footage of the other characters later in post-production. Wood interacted with a light stand during filming, which was later replaced by a visual effect creating Jabba. The moment when Wood woke up a sleeping Jabba at the end of the podrace was a joke conceived by the motion picture visual effects company Industrial Light & Magic during the making of the film, which George Lucas loved. Wood reprised the role of Fortuna in the Smuggler's Gambit radio drama, recorded live at Star Wars Celebration VI in Orlando in August 2012. This time he provided the voice for the character, something he did not do in the film.

Wood reprised the role for the season two finale of The Mandalorian.

In The Book of Boba Fett, Wood also portrays Bib Fortuna.

=== Other portrayals ===
Bib Fortuna was voiced by David Dukes in the radio dramitization of Return of the Jedi released in 1996 by Highbridge Audio. Alan Ruscoe, who portrayed the Jedi master Plo Koon and the Neimoidian captain Daultay Dofine in The Phantom Menace, also portrayed Fortuna in a scene before the Galactic Senate, but it was ultimately cut from the final film.

== Cultural impact ==
=== Critical reception ===
The name and first photo of Bib Fortuna were first revealed to the public in a Return of the Jedi poster book published by Paradise Press in May 1983, the first of four such magazines released in advance of the film. In his 1983 review of Return of the Jedi, Desmond Ryan of The Philadelphia Inquirer cited Fortuna as one of the diverse types of alien species in the film that "reaffirms the inventiveness and inspiration of Lucas and his legions of craftsmen and technicians". Ryan also said Fortuna "looks like David Bowie with a large bratwurst sausage growing out of his ear".

Fortuna was ranked No. 25 on Rolling Stone's list of the 50 best Star Wars characters, and was also included among The Daily Telegraph's list of the best characters from the franchise. CNET writer Sam Stone called Fortuna "one of the most memorable" characters and alien races from Return of the Jedi and described him as "a fan-favorite character". Star Wars Insider writer Calum Waddell described Bib Fortuna as "one of the standout supporting characters" of Return of the Jedi. Scott Chernoff of Star Wars Insider said Michael Carter conveyed "a touching vulnerability through his makeup and contact lenses, transforming what could have been a stock character into a sadly haunting figure".

Fortuna's line "De wanna wanga", which he speaks upon first meeting C-3PO and R2-D2 in Return of the Jedi, has become a well-known line of Star Wars dialogue. Michael Carter has noted the character he portrayed became far more famous than the actor himself, joking: "Bib Fortuna's very famous; I'm hardly known within my own family." Daniel Mallory Ortberg, an author and editor who has written a Star Wars short story for the anthology book From a Certain Point of View (2017), has said Tales from Jabba's Palace and reading the back story of Bib Fortuna and other characters was one of the first times the franchise strongly resonated with him. Comedian and actor Nick Swardson called Bib Fortuna one of his favorite Star Wars characters.

=== Merchandise ===
An action figure of Bib Fortuna was released by Kenner Products in 1983, coinciding with the release of Return of the Jedi. The toy was distributed in Europe by the company Palitoy. The action figure came with a miniature staff, and Fortuna wears a brown cloak in most versions, but five known prototypes exist in which he wears a white cloak, and they are considered among the most rare and valuable Star Wars toys. Several other Bib Fortuna products were released in 1983, including an eraser by Butterfly Originals, and a cookie by Pepperidge Farm. A Bib Fortuna toy was released in 1993 as part of the Star Wars Bend-Ems line by JusToys, a collection of rubber figures that could be easily bent and twisted.

In 1996, Bib Fortuna was one of the Star Wars characters to receive its own Micro Machines mini-transforming playsets by Galoob. The toy line included miniature versions of the head of each character, which opened to reveal a small set from the film and a figurine of the character itself. The Fortuna playset was sold as part of a collection that also included an Imperial Scout Trooper and Figrin D'an, one of the Mos Eisley Cantina band members. Fortuna was also included in a Micro Machines playset of the planet Tatooine, which included both Jabba's palace and the Great Pit of Carkoon. A Bib Fortuna action figure was released in 1997 as part of Kenner's The Power Of The Force toy line, as part of the 20th anniversary of the release of the first Star Wars film. The toy came with a small gun described as a "black hold-out blaster". Also in 1997, Kenner released a two-pack of 12-inch figures of Fortuna and Luke Skywalker.

A ceramic mug of Fortuna was released in 1996 as part of the Star Wars Classic Collectors Series Figural Mug line by the toy company Applause. Between 1997 and 1999, the Japanese company JAP Inc. created a series of large silver sculpted Star Wars rings from the various Star Wars characters, including Bib Fortuna. A Lego figurine of Bib Fortuna was created and released as part of multiple Lego Star Wars toy sets, including one of the front gate of Jabba's palace released in 2003, and another of the interior of the palace released in 2012. Fortuna was one of 55 Star Wars skins released in November 2014 for the Xbox 360 and Xbox One versions of the video game Minecraft. A Funko Pop figurine of Fortuna was released in 2015. In 2017, the company Gentle Giant made a limited run of 750 miniature busts of Bib Fortuna, utilizing 3-D technology to create a 1:6-scale replica of the character.

An auction was held by the Dallas-based Heritage Auctions in August 2018 for a collection of 33 rare Star Wars action figures that were expected to sell for about $360,000. The collection, which was sold by an anonymous collector from Dubai, included one of the five known original prototypes of Fortuna's action figure, which alone was expected to sell for about $30,000. The 1980s master model of the Bib Fortuna toy by Kenner Products was sold at the Thornaby-based Vectis Auctions for £36,000 in April 2019. It had an estimated value of £12,000 before the auction, but sold for the highest amount of any of the Star Wars prototypes auctioned, including an Emperor's Royal Guard that sold for £28,800 and Ewok named Logray that sold for £12,000. The models were saved by a Palitoy tooling manager who had kept them following the release of the figures. A rare encapsulated Bib Fortuna action figure included in an auction in Pennsylvania in November 2019 was expected to seek between $10,000 and $75,000.

In 2021 and 2023, Hasbro released two super-articulated action figures of Bib Fortuna based on his appearances in both Return of the Jedi and The Book of Boba Fett.
