= Admiral Ackbar =

Fictional character in the Star Wars franchise

- Star Wars character
- Timothy D. Rose as Admiral Ackbar in Return of the Jedi (1983)
- First appearance: Star Wars comic strip (1982)
- Last appearance: Ahsoka (2023)
- Created by: George Lucas; Lawrence Kasdan; Richard Marquand; Nilo Rodis-Jamero
- Portrayed by: Timothy D. Rose (Episode VI-VIII); Elden Bennett (Ahsoka)
- Voiced by: Erik Bauersfeld (Episode VI–VII, Star Wars Battlefront: Elite Squadron and Star Wars: X-Wing); Tom Kane (Episode VIII, Star Wars: Battlefront (2004 video game), Star Tours – The Adventures Continue, Lego Star Wars: The Padawan Menace, Disney Infinity 3.0, Hyperspace Mountain (Disneyland and Hong Kong Disneyland), Lego Star Wars: The Force Awakens and Star Wars: Battlefront 2 (2017 video game)); Artt Butler (Star Wars: The Clone Wars); Other: Mark Adair Rios (Return of the Jedi radio drama); Terence McGovern (Star Wars: X-Wing Alliance); Peter McConnell (Star Wars Rogue Squadron II: Rogue Leader); Chris Cox (Star Wars Rogue Squadron III: Rebel Strike); Edmund Dehn (Star Wars: Empire at War); Andrew Chaikin (Star Wars Battlefront: Renegade Squadron); Breckin Meyer (Robot Chicken and Star Wars Detours); Trevor Devall (Lego Star Wars: The Yoda Chronicles, Lego Star Wars: Droid Tales, Lego Star Wars: The Resistance Rises, Lego Star Wars: The Freemaker Adventures, Lego Star Wars: All Stars, and Lego Star Wars: Rebuild the Galaxy)

In-universe information
- Full name: Gial Ackbar
- Species: Mon Calamari
- Gender: Male
- Title: Fleet Admiral
- Occupation: Supreme Commander of the Alliance Fleet
- Affiliation: Rebel Alliance; New Republic; Resistance
- Children: Aftab Ackbar (son)
- Relatives: Jahidul Akber - Ivan Akber (niece, deceased) (Legends); Cilghal (niece); (Legends)
- Homeworld: Mon Calamari

Fleet Admiral Gial Ackbar is a fictional character from the Star Wars franchise. A member of the amphibious Mon Calamari species, Ackbar was the foremost military commander of the Rebel Alliance and led the attack against the second Death Star in Return of the Jedi (1983), the final entry in the original Star Wars trilogy. Although his time in the film was brief, Ackbar became a prominent character in other Star Wars media, including novels, comic books, video games, and television shows, and later made appearances in the sequel trilogy films Star Wars: The Force Awakens (2015) and Star Wars: The Last Jedi (2017), and the television series The Clone Wars.

With his distinctive salmon-colored skin, webbed hands, high-domed head, and large fish-like eyes, Ackbar was realized in Return of the Jedi through the use of either a half-body puppet or full-body costume, depending on the camera angle required. In all three films he was portrayed by puppeteer Timothy D. Rose, who originally played other characters, but requested to also play Ackbar after seeing his sculpt on a display stand. Ackbar was voiced by Erik Bauersfeld, who made up the voice on the spot after looking at a photograph of Ackbar. Bauersfeld voiced the character in Return of the Jedi and The Force Awakens, but died before the filming of The Last Jedi, in which he was replaced by Tom Kane, who had voiced Ackbar in other works of Star Wars media.

Ackbar was originally planned to be more conventionally humanoid, but after Star Wars creator George Lucas decided to make him an alien, he allowed Return of the Jedi director Richard Marquand to pick from various designs. Marquand picked a sketch by concept artist Nilo Rodis-Jamero, over the objections of other members of the film crew who thought the character looked too silly or ugly. Ackbar made his first appearance not in the film, but in a Star Wars newspaper comic strip that ran a few months before Return of the Jedi was released. Lucas was not entirely pleased with the final result of the character in the film and felt it was a compromise. Ackbar's first name, Gial, was not established until April 2012.

Ackbar had just 14 lines of dialogue in Return of the Jedi, and his total screen time across all three film appearances totaled only three minutes and 30 seconds. Nevertheless, he is considered a fan favorite among Star Wars characters, and was ranked No. 16 in a 1998 list of the "Top 20 Star Wars Characters" in the magazine Star Wars Insider. His line "It's a trap!" from Return of the Jedi became one of the most famous, quoted and beloved lines from the original Star Wars trilogy, as well as a popular Internet meme.

== Character biography ==
=== Backstory ===
Admiral Ackbar was best known for his appearance in the film Return of the Jedi, the final entry in the original Star Wars trilogy. However, before the May 1983 debut of that film, the character made his first chronological appearance in the Star Wars newspaper comic strip by Archie Goodwin and Al Williamson. Published by the Los Angeles Times Syndicate, the strip ran in newspapers across the United States from November 1982 to January 1983. In the comic, Ackbar was portrayed as the leader of the Mon Calamari, an alien species of fish-like, amphibious humanoids with salmon-colored skin, webbed hands, high-domed heads, and large fish-like eyes, and who can breathe both on land and underwater. They are allies of the Rebel Alliance in their conflict with the Galactic Empire. In the comic, which is set before the events of the film The Empire Strikes Back (1980), Ackbar and his crew are stranded on the planet Daluuj after an Imperial attack, and they are rescued by Han Solo, Luke Skywalker, and Princess Leia Organa in the Millennium Falcon. Ackbar demonstrates his tactical abilities by agitating water monsters in a ploy to raise the sunken Falcon from a mud swamp.

Ackbar's backstory was not explained in Return of the Jedi, but has been established in Star Wars books and other media since the film was released. He is from the planet Mon Cala, a world almost entirely covered by water, where his species built giant floating cities. Ackbar is the leader of his home town, Coral Depths City, when forces from the Galactic Empire invade and nearly destroy the planet. Despite the Mon Calamari's attempts to make peace, the Imperial forces destroy several of their cities, steal their technology, and enslave its population. Ackbar is one of the first to be enslaved, and becomes an interpreter and personal servant to Grand Moff Tarkin, a secondary antagonist from the first Star Wars film. During this time, Ackbar learns much about both the Empire and military tactics in general, as well as about the Rebel Alliance and the Death Star, a moon-sized superweapon Tarkin is developing at the time. Ackbar takes detailed notes about what he observed with the hopes of eventually escaping back to his people and using the information against the Empire.

Ackbar is freed from captivity during a failed attempt by Rebel forces to capture Tarkin. He joins the Rebel Alliance, where the knowledge he obtained during his captivity made him indispensable. Ackbar returns to the Mon Calamari people and, after leading them through numerous conflicts, convinces them to formally support the Rebel cause, bringing with them the massive Mon Calamari cruisers that drastically improves the strength of the Rebel fleet. Starting with the rank of Commander, Ackbar helps design the B-wing, a powerful line of starfighters. This success prompts Rebel leader Mon Mothma to promote him to Admiral, news he reacts to heavily due to the weight of the responsibility. Following events in the film Star Wars, including the destruction of the Death Star, Admiral Akbar helps the other Rebel leaders establish new bases of operation and manage a Rebel mobile task force in starships spread across the galaxy. He rises up the ranks until Mothma promotes him to commander of the entire Rebel fleet and head of military operations, as well as one of her top advisers.

=== Return of the Jedi ===
Admiral Ackbar was the first character not resemblant of a human shown in a leadership position in the Star Wars films. In Return of the Jedi, when Rebel spies discover plans for a partially constructed second Death Star, Ackbar and Mon Mothma plan a surprise assault on the battle station as it orbits the forest moon of Endor. The attack, known as the Battle of Endor, involves General Han Solo leading a strike team on the moon's surface to destroy the Death Star's energy shield generator, while Ackbar and General Lando Calrissian lead a battle against the station itself. Ackbar personally leads the assault from his flagship, the Mon Calamari cruiser Home One. The attack does not go as planned, however, because Emperor Palpatine was expecting the assault and had in fact allowed the Death Star plans to fall into Rebel hands. On Palpatine's order, Imperial forces launch a massive counterattack against the Rebel fleet with TIE starfighters and Star Destroyer capital ships, which leads Ackbar to realize that the fleet is heading into a trap. He initially calls for a tactical retreat, but Calrissian convinces him to move forward with the attack and give Solo's team more time to destroy the energy shield. The Rebel forces suffer heavy casualties, but ultimately succeed in destroying the second Death Star and defeating the Empire.

=== The Clone Wars ===
An animated version of Ackbar in Star Wars: The Clone Wars, which is set roughly 20 years before the events of the first Star Wars film

Ackbar appeared in the first three episodes of the fourth season of the animated series Star Wars: The Clone Wars, which is set roughly 20 years before the events of the first Star Wars film. In the show, Ackbar is a chief adviser of the Mon Cala king, Yos Kolina, and captain of the Mon Calamari royal guard, where he hones the abilities that later serve him as an Admiral. The fragile peace between Mon Cala's two primary species, the Calamari and the Quarren, is disrupted after King Kolina is assassinated by Riff Tamson, an agent for the Confederacy of Independent Systems, also known as the Separatists, one of the primary antagonists of the series. Attempting to spark a civil war on the planet, the Separatists use Quarren insurgents to obstruct Mon Cala Prince Lee-Char's succession to the throne, and Ackbar attempts to protect Lee-Char and rally the Mon Calamari people as a battle for the planet begins. The battle is lost, despite the assistance of the Jedi Ahsoka Tano, Anakin Skywalker, and Kit Fisto. Ackbar is captured, leaving Ahsoka and Lee-Char to fend for themselves. However, after learning that Tamson plans to install himself as the new king, the Quarren betrays the Separatists at Lee-Char's public execution ceremony. Afterwards, Ackbar is freed and helps lead a counterassault to retake the planet. Tamson is killed by Lee-Char, who is crowned the new king.

Dave Filoni, supervising director on The Clone Wars, said he had planned on featuring Ackbar in the series since the second season due to the character's relevance to the original trilogy, and because he was old enough in those films to have been alive when The Clone Wars was set. Keith Kellogg, animation supervisor for the series, said of the character: "To see him as his younger self commanding an army in the field was really fun, and to be able to see him mentor Lee-Char was great."

=== Sequel trilogy ===
Ackbar as he appeared in Star Wars: The Force Awakens (2015), which was released 32 years after Return of the Jedi

Admiral Ackbar appeared in the first two films of the Star Wars sequel trilogy, which were distributed by Walt Disney Studios Motion Pictures after The Walt Disney Company acquired Lucasfilm in 2012. His character is retired from military service before the events of the films, but Leia Organa convinces him to come out of retirement to fight against the First Order, a military dictatorship that was formed from the remnants of the original Empire. He regains his prior rank of Admiral and serves as one of the leaders of the Resistance, a paramilitary organization led by Leia, who is now a General. Ackbar is in command of the Resistance fleet, with the Mon Calamari cruiser Raddus as his flagship. Ackbar is widely respected by the Resistance personnel as one of the few living commanders to have faced the Empire during the height of its power. In the first film, Star Wars: The Force Awakens (2015), Ackbar appears at the headquarters of the Resistance, and helps develop the plan to destroy the First Order's new superweapon, Starkiller Base. He later monitors the successful attack against the weapon alongside Leia from the Resistance base on the planet D'Qar.

Members of the cast and crew were particularly excited to film a scene with Ackbar. Ben Rosenblatt, a co-producer with The Force Awakens, said having Ackbar on the set was "the moment that meant the most to me, personally", adding: "Security has been so tight, we're not allowed to take pictures or anything, but I had to take a picture of Ackbar on set and show it to my brothers because we loved Ackbar." Actor John Boyega, who portrayed Finn, said of performing with Ackbar: "as a Star Wars fan, it doesn't get any cooler than that." Gary Whitta, a writer who has worked on several Star Wars projects, said: "When I went to the set of The Force Awakens, the first thing I had to do was put on the Admiral Ackbar mask, and I did. It was a big deal, and I've always loved that character."

In the trilogy's second film, Star Wars: The Last Jedi (2017), Ackbar leads the Resistance as they evacuate their base on D'Qar, and orders the ships to jump to hyperspace to escape the First Order. The First Order fleet pursues the Resistance, sending Kylo Ren and other TIE fighters after the MC85 Star Cruiser Raddus, on which Ackbar and other senior Resistance leaders are aboard. First Order TIEs open fire on the main bridge of the Raddus, causing a massive explosion and blowing all occupants into the vacuum of space. Ackbar is killed, along with everyone else on the bridge except for Leia, who is saved by her use of the Force. Although Ackbar had no lines of dialogue during his death scene in the film, the comic book adaptation of The Last Jedi revealed that his last words were: "Torpedoes inbound. It's been an honor serving with you all." Whitta, who wrote the comic book adaptation, said he was saddened Ackbar died so quickly in the film, so he wanted to give him "a little bit of a moment before he dies".

Ackbar's total screen time across all three of his Star Wars film appearances totaled only three minutes and 30 seconds. He was originally planned to appear in Rogue One (2016), a standalone anthology film separate from the sequel trilogy. During the initial screenwriting process, he appeared leading a space fleet during the climactic space battle at the end of the film. However, he was removed in later script revisions and his part replaced by Admiral Raddus, who, in an homage to Ackbar, was also a member of the Mon Calamari species. Whitta, who co-wrote the story of the film, said he wanted Ackbar included, but since he was already featured in The Force Awakens, the team behind Rogue One decided the character should not appear in two films released so closely together.

=== Ahsoka ===
Ackbar makes a non-speaking appearance at Hera Syndulla's disciplinary hearing on Corusant.

=== Other Star Wars media ===
Although his role in the Star Wars films was relatively brief, Admiral Ackbar became a prominent character in the Star Wars Expanded Universe, which encompasses all licensed stories in the Star Wars universe outside of the nine main feature films, such as novels, comic books, video games, and television shows. With the 2012 acquisition of Lucasfilm by The Walt Disney Company, most of the licensed Star Wars novels and comics produced since the originating 1977 film Star Wars were rebranded as Star Wars Legends and declared non-canon to the franchise in April 2014. As a result, Ackbar has two separate storylines and character histories outside of the feature films: one in the Legends canon encompassing all Star Wars media before April 2014, and one in the official Disney canon for all media after April 2014.

==== Legends continuity ====
Ackbar was a central character in Strike Force: Shantipole, an adventure book for use with the Star Wars: The Roleplaying Game released in June 1988 by West End Games. Set before the chronological events of Return of the Jedi, the book portrayed Ackbar's secret development of the B-wing starfighters and his efforts to recruit the Verpine, the alien species building the ships, into the Rebel Alliance. In the storyline, the B-wings are designed in a research facility on an asteroid named Shantipole, and the project is nearly compromised by an Imperial spy, forcing Ackbar and other characters to repel an Imperial attack and escape. Ackbar appears in Dark Empire, a six-issue comic book series that detailed the resurrection of Emperor Palpatine, as well as Luke Skywalker's brief conversion to the dark side of the Force. In the comics, Ackbar and Mon Mothma attempts to lead the Rebel Alliance through the crisis, and Ackbar later organizes a response when his home world is attacked by the Empire's new superweapons, the World Devastators.

In the Star Wars novels written between 1991 and 1998, following the events of the Return of the Jedi, Ackbar maintains a key position in the command hierarchy of the Rebel Alliance, as well as that of the New Republic, the government established to replace the Empire. He was a signatory on the formal declaration of the New Republic and one of nine individuals to join the New Republic Provisional Council, the initial governing body of this new form of government. Ackbar is part of the many mop-up operations that targets the Empire's dwindling territories, including the defeat of Grand Admiral Peccati Syn during the liberation of the Wookiee planet Kashyyyk, and the defeat of Imperial warlord Zsinj. Before his death, Zsinj brainwashes several aliens and forces them to make assassination attempts against several high-profile Rebel leaders, including Ackbar.

Ackbar appeared in the Heir to the Empire trilogy of books written by Timothy Zahn and published from 1991 to 1993, which were widely credited with rejuvenating interest in Star Wars at the time. In those books, which are set five years after Return of the Jedi, Ackbar is instrumental in working with Luke Skywalker, Han Solo, Leia Organa, and Mon Mothma in reestablishing the New Republic and defeating Grand Admiral Thrawn, the new leader of the remaining forces of the Empire. In the second novel of the series, Dark Force Rising, Thrawn attempts to frame Ackbar for treason by placing stolen money into his personal accounts. Borsk Fey'lya, a political rival of Ackbar, exploits this and has him arrested and placed on trial, but Han Solo and Lando Calrissian obtain evidence that proves his innocence, and he is restored to his military position. Ackbar plans a raid against Thrawn on the planet Bilbringi, seeking to severely damage the Grand Admiral's shipbuilding capability and steal Imperial technology. Thrawn learns of the raid and sets a trap for Ackbar and his forces, but the New Republic ultimately win the battle after Thrawn is assassinated by his own bodyguard.

Ackbar played a prominent supporting role in the Star Wars: X-wing series of novels, which detailed Ackbar leading the successful campaign to recapture the capital planet of Coruscant, among other events. This series also portrays the death of Ackbar's niece, Jesmin Ackbar, a Rogue Squadron starfighter pilot who is killed in action. Ackbar played a supporting role in the Jedi Academy Trilogy, a set of novels by Kevin J. Anderson released in 1994 and set two years after the Heir to the Empire trilogy. In those novels, Ackbar's personal starfighter crashes on the planet of Vortex in an incident that kills numerous innocent aliens and nearly kills Ackbar himself. In disgrace, he resigns from his post and retires to his home planet. It is later revealed that the crash was the result of Imperial sabotage, and Leia tries to persuade Ackbar to return to military service. During that time, Mon Calamari is attacked by Imperial Admiral Natasi Daala, one of the primary antagonists of the Jedi Academy trilogy. Ackbar leads the successful defense of his planet and defeats Daala, and later returns to his military post.

Ackbar retires from military service before the beginning of The New Jedi Order series of Star Wars novels, which were first published in 1999 and were set about 25 years after the original trilogy. However, even as his body begins to fail him due to his advanced age, he comes out of retirement when the Yuuzhan Vong attempt to conquer the galaxy in a bloody war that nearly destroys the New Republic. He appeared in the book Destiny's Way (2002), and upon his return to military service, the message "Ackbar is back!" is transmitted to the entire Defense Force, inspired by a similar real-life transmission "Winston is back!" reportedly issued to the British fleet about Winston Churchill during World War II. In the book, Ackbar serves in a command post in the newly formed Galactic Alliance government, where he formulates strategies that result in a major victory against the Yuuzhan Vong, the Battle of Ebaq, ultimately helping turn the tide of the war. It is revealed in The Unifying Force (2003), the final novel of the New Jedi Order series, that Ackbar dies of old age shortly before the end of the war, after which he receives a grand memorial service. His death, which occurs 29 years after the events of the first Star Wars film, does not occur within the prose of the novel; rather, the characters are notified that his death occurred. A Galactic Alliance Star Destroyer is named in his honor; the Admiral Ackbar first appears in the novel The Unseen Queen (2005), set several years after the character's death.

Ackbar has appeared in several Star Wars video games, starting with the 1993 LucasArts space simulation computer game Star Wars: X-Wing, in which he provided military briefings for the pilot character controlled by the player. Ackbar made an appearance in Star Wars Galaxies, an MMORPG developed by Sony Online Entertainment and first released in 2003. The game is set shortly after the events of the first Star Wars film, and Ackbar has a rank of Captain. Ackbar also appeared in the 2007 video game Star Wars Battlefront: Renegade Squadron, in which he was kidnapped by the bounty hunter Boba Fett and handed over to the Empire, who imprisoned him aboard an Imperial cruiser. In the game, the player is a member of Renegade Squadron, a military unit formed by Han Solo composed of pirates and smugglers, and the rescue of Ackbar is one of the game's playable missions. Ackbar can be played as a hidden character in the Nintendo Wii version of the 2008 video game Star Wars: The Force Unleashed if the player entered the cheat code "ITSATWAP".

==== Official canon ====
Admiral Ackbar appeared in Star Wars: Aftermath, a 2015 canon novel by Chuck Wendig set immediately after the events of Return of the Jedi. During one passage, Ackbar made an impassioned speech, warning his fellow officials in the newly formed New Republic that while the Empire suffered a heavy loss with the death of Emperor Palpatine and the destruction of the Death Star II, the Empire was still a threat and the war was not yet over. In the novel, Ackbar participated in the New Republic's efforts to seek out the remnants of the Empire hiding in the Outer Rim region of the galaxy, and he communicated with his colleague Wedge Antilles before Antilles' disappearance on the planet Akiva, where much of the book's story was set.

Ackbar appeared in Aftermath's two sequel books, Life Debt (2016) and Empire's End (2017), also written by Wendig. In Life Debt, Ackbar led the successful assault against Kuat Drive Yards, a major starship manufacturer that had previously been supplying the Empire. In Empire's End, Ackbar commanded the New Republic fleet during the Battle of Jakku, a decisive victory that resulted in the destruction of the Empire and the end of the Galactic Civil War. In an interview with USA Today, Wendig said Ackbar was his favorite established Star Wars character to write for in the novel: "One of the great things about the universe is that we have all of these characters who get a small amount of screen time but who impact us in huge ways. .. Ackbar for me was always this amazing, grizzled war veteran, and getting to inhabit him and his voice for the new book made me pretty giddy."

Ackbar has a minor part in the novel Star Wars: Bloodline (2016) by Claudia Gray, which focused largely on Leia Organa prior to the events of The Force Awakens. The novel included the public disclosure that Organa is the daughter of Darth Vader, which nearly destroyed her reputation and led many to condemn her. Ackbar, however, sent her messages of support after the public revelation, an indication of his respect for her. In a storyline that crossed over between the comic book Star Wars: C-3PO and the Disney XD television series Lego Star Wars: The Resistance Rises (both released in 2016), it was established that Ackbar was captured by the First Order some time after his recruitment into the Resistance. In the story, the droid C-3PO obtained information that Ackbar had been imprisoned aboard an Imperial battlecruiser, and the droid worked with fellow Resistance operatives BB-8 and Poe Dameron to infiltrate the ship and rescue him from Captain Phasma.

Ackbar played a supporting role in the "Burning Seas" story arc from the comic book series Darth Vader: Dark Lord of the Sith, which was released in 2018 but was set about one year after the events of Revenge of the Sith, the final movie in the Star Wars prequel trilogy. In the story arc, entitled "Burning Seas", Ackbar was a commander and Chief of Security for Mon Cala King Lee-Char, and Darth Vader and his forces visited the planet to strengthen the Empire's influence there. Ackbar set a trap for the Empire by luring their aerial landing platforms closer to the planet, then firing special undetectable missiles at them once they were in range. The victory proved temporary, however, as Grand Moff Tarkin escalated hostilities as a result and ultimate overtook the planet, resulting in King Lee-Char's capture and eventual death.

Ackbar appeared briefly in the 2017 Star Wars Battlefront II video game developed by EA DICE. During the prologue of the story mode, in which Imperial agent and the game's protagonist Iden Versio has infiltrated a Mon Calamari cruiser, a hologram of Ackbar discussing the Rebel Alliance's plans to attack the second Death Star is briefly visible.

A Mon Calamari named Aftab Ackbar, Admiral Ackbar's son, was created to appear as a minor character in Star Wars: The Rise of Skywalker (2019), the final film in the sequel trilogy. He was created as a result of early script conversations between The Rise of Skywalker co-writers J. J. Abrams and Chris Terrio, who provided the voice for the character. Terrio was a fan of Admiral Ackbar and said he "went into mourning a bit" when the character was killed. Prior to the film's debut, Aftab first appeared in comic book miniseries Star Wars: Allegiance released in October 2019. The miniseries is set after the events of The Last Jedi, and features Leia Organa and her allies visit Mon Cala to seek allies and resources for the Resistance. Aftab assists her, and it is revealed that Admiral Ackbar was seldom present for Aftab's childhood due to his military career, but Aftab studying all of his battle tactics and still felt a strong connection to his father. Aftab is a Colonel with the Resistance in The Rise of Skywalker, He appears in several scenes, including a Resistance meeting to discuss the resurrection of Emperor Palpatine, and the final space battle over Exegol, during which he pilots a B-wing starfighter.

== Characterization ==
Ackbar is portrayed as a military genius, with a masterful grasp of warfare tactics and strategy, a forward-thinking vision, and a prowess for organizational, administrative, and technical details that make him a highly effective commander. Across all his appearances in the Star Wars franchise, he possesses tactical intelligence and strong leadership skills, and is widely admired and respected by his troops. Ackbar has a methodical style, and tends to be cautious and conservative, as demonstrated by his initial call for a tactical retreat during the Battle of Endor upon learning that it was a trap. He prefers to personally lead major assaults, fearlessly flying into the battlefield along with his soldiers. Ackbar is resourceful and uses outside-the-box methods to improve himself as an officer. For example, in the novel Aftermath, Ackbar practices with melee weapons against holograms of Imperial stormtroopers. Though he acknowledges that he is unlikely to face melee combat as a high-ranking officer, he engages in the practice because he feels staying proficient in fighting techniques helps him stay sharp, flexible, and ahead of his enemies. Ackbar also studies various forms of weaponry and fighting, and has strong design skills, made evident by his role in designing the B-wing starfighter.

Ackbar is also regularly portrayed as wise, with a noble personality and a quiet but firm temperament. Rising from humble beginnings, he is a peaceful being who is forced to learn war due to tyranny of the Empire, and never stops working for peace despite understanding the necessity of war. Despite his success as a warrior, his actions are usually shown to be tempered by justice, honor, and concern. In the Star Wars sequel trilogy and other media set around that time period, Ackbar is portrayed as more gruff in his older age, during which he commands officers many years or even decades younger than him, sometimes referring to them as "fry". His dedication to his career and duty left little time for a personal life or romances, and as a result he does not have a family of his own, with the exception of two nieces.

== Concept and creation ==
=== Conception ===
I think he ended up commanding the troops not so much because of my performance, but because of his look. He had a screen presence. He was originally just a background character. They created a whole series of characters, and they had these roles they needed filled. He ended up filling it because he just had the magic. He had the charisma. When you came into the workshop, somehow you looked at him instead of the four other creatures. ... Ackbar became a character in the process of building him.

— Timothy D. Rose

In the original script for Return of the Jedi, Ackbar's appearance was more conventionally humanoid, with blue skin and more physically attractive; the second draft of the screenplay described him as a "pale blue nonhuman". Star Wars creator George Lucas later decided he should be an alien creature instead, and gave the film's director, Richard Marquand, the option to pick a look for Ackbar from a collection of about 50 alien designs, despite Marquand's initial insistence that Lucas himself make the choice. Marquand picked a painting by concept artist Nilo Rodis-Jamero of an anonymous alien with no established backstory or personality.

Rodis-Jamero's first Ackbar sketch was created in the fall of 1981, two years before Return of the Jedi was released, and was known at the time simply as a "Calamari man"--Calamari being the Italian word for squid in reference to the creature's quasi-mollusk appearance. The original image mostly resembled how Ackbar ended up in the final film, except with a larger chin, slightly more misshapen head, and a hunchback. The hunch was inspired by Industrial Light & Magic technician Stuart Ziff, who regularly joked about his own slightly hunched posture. Marquand said he "picked the most delicious, wonderful creature out of the whole lot, this big wonderful Calamari man with a red face and eyes on the side". Others working on the film opposed the choice, believing the character looked too silly or ugly and would be mocked, but Marquand insisted upon the choice and their objections were rejected. Marquand said of those concerns: "I think it's good to tell kids that good people aren't necessarily good-looking people and that bad people aren't necessarily ugly people."

Ackbar's first name, Gial, was not established until the April 2012 release of the Star Wars reference book The Essential Guide to Warfare. Co-author Paul R. Urquhart told the website TheForce.net said the name was taken from Gial Gahan, a Mon Calamari Senator character who played a minor role in the Star Wars: Legacy comic book series. While the name Gial was established in material that has since been rebranded as part of the Legends canon, the first name is still considered part of the official canon, and has been re-confirmed as Ackbar's name in canon reference books like Star Wars: Absolutely Everything You Need To Know, as well as other canon Star Wars novels.

=== Costume and puppet ===
"Ackbar represented the ingenuity in creature and costume development at the time. Neither the full-body nor close-up version of Ackbar were capable of generating a complete performance on their own, but shot separately and seamlessly edited together, they gave the admiral a realistic feel."

— Brandon Alinger, author of Star Wars Costumes: The Original Trilogy

Ackbar's appearance in the film was created using a combination of either a half-body puppet or a full-body costume, depending on the camera angle required for the shot. The puppet and mask were created by the "Monster Shop" of Industrial Light & Magic, the motion picture visual effects company founded by Lucas. In close-up scenes of Ackbar that required dialogue, puppeteer Timothy M. Rose sat inside the chest of the character and operated the head like a traditional hand puppet from below. Rose moved the mouth using his hand, while Mike Quinn operated the eyes via cables. The jumpsuit of that version of the costume was cut off at the waist, and each sleeves included additional access points where a puppeteer could insert his or her arm to control Ackbar's hands.

For wider shots that showed Ackbar's full body, Rose wore the mask and costume while Quinn operated the mouth via remote. Though most other Rebel officers in the Return of the Jedi briefing room scene wore earth tones, Rodis-Jamero felt Ackbar's costume should be more crisp and distinctive: "He was an admiral. He was more military. His costume looks hard." Costume designer Aggie Guerard Rodgers helped create the Ackbar costume, for which Rose wore a beanbag-like piece around his belly to create Ackbar's distinctive silhouette. Rose wore a white nylon jumpsuit over it, which had a pattern loosely based on ski jumpsuits used in costuming other background characters, as well as yellow striping down the side of the legs. The artificial fabric used on the jumpsuit made a distinct scratching sound whenever the actor walked, which Rodgers said was a nuisance for the film's sound crew.

Over the jumpsuit, Rose wore a vest made of white felt, along with a white plastic utility belt, a rank badge on the left side of his chest, and a large collar to accommodate the unique profile of Ackbar's head. The white boots Ackbar wears in the film are the same design as those worn by Imperial stormtroopers. A white helmet with an elongated back to accommodate Ackbar's large oval-shaped head was featured in original character sketches and was created for Ackbar. However, it created too many complications with the operation of the puppet head, so it was worn by another Mon Calamari character instead. Edwina Pellikka, a textile artist who handled the breakdown and aging of costumes in the film, said she was unhappy with the final result of Ackbar's costume. She later reflected that the all-white costume could have used more aging, saying: "I had to airbrush it, which was done very fast and it does look kind of like it's outlined. Not enough was done with that."

=== Filming ===
Ackbar has 14 lines of dialogue in Return of the Jedi, and the character's scenes took six weeks to shoot. Due to uncertainty whether the mouth about movement Ackbar puppet would look realistic while delivering dialogue, alternative scenes were shot with General Crix Madine, a human character portrayed by Dermot Crowley, delivering Ackbar's most important lines, in case they had to be used instead. None of these shots ultimately had to be used in the final film. Occasionally, members of the film crew jokingly referred to the Ackbar character as "Ernie Ackbar", and his name appeared that way on some of the film's progress reports. When the inside of the costume became hot, visual effects artist Phil Tippett, who designed most of the film's creatures, would use a hair dryer to blow cool air through the mouth of the Ackbar mask to keep Rose comfortable.

Although the character was created with the best available puppetry technology at the time, Lucas was not entirely pleased with the final result and felt it was a compromise. According to the book Star Wars Costumes: The Original Trilogy, published in 2014, the original masks used for the Ackbar costumes are "in a fragile state today." During filming of the 2005 Star Wars film Revenge of the Sith, Lucas was so impressed with the animatron mask used on the Mon Calamari character Meena Tills that he briefly considered reediting Return of the Jedi and replacing footage of Admiral Ackbar with an improved mask. This ultimately never occurred.

== Portrayals ==
=== Timothy Rose ===
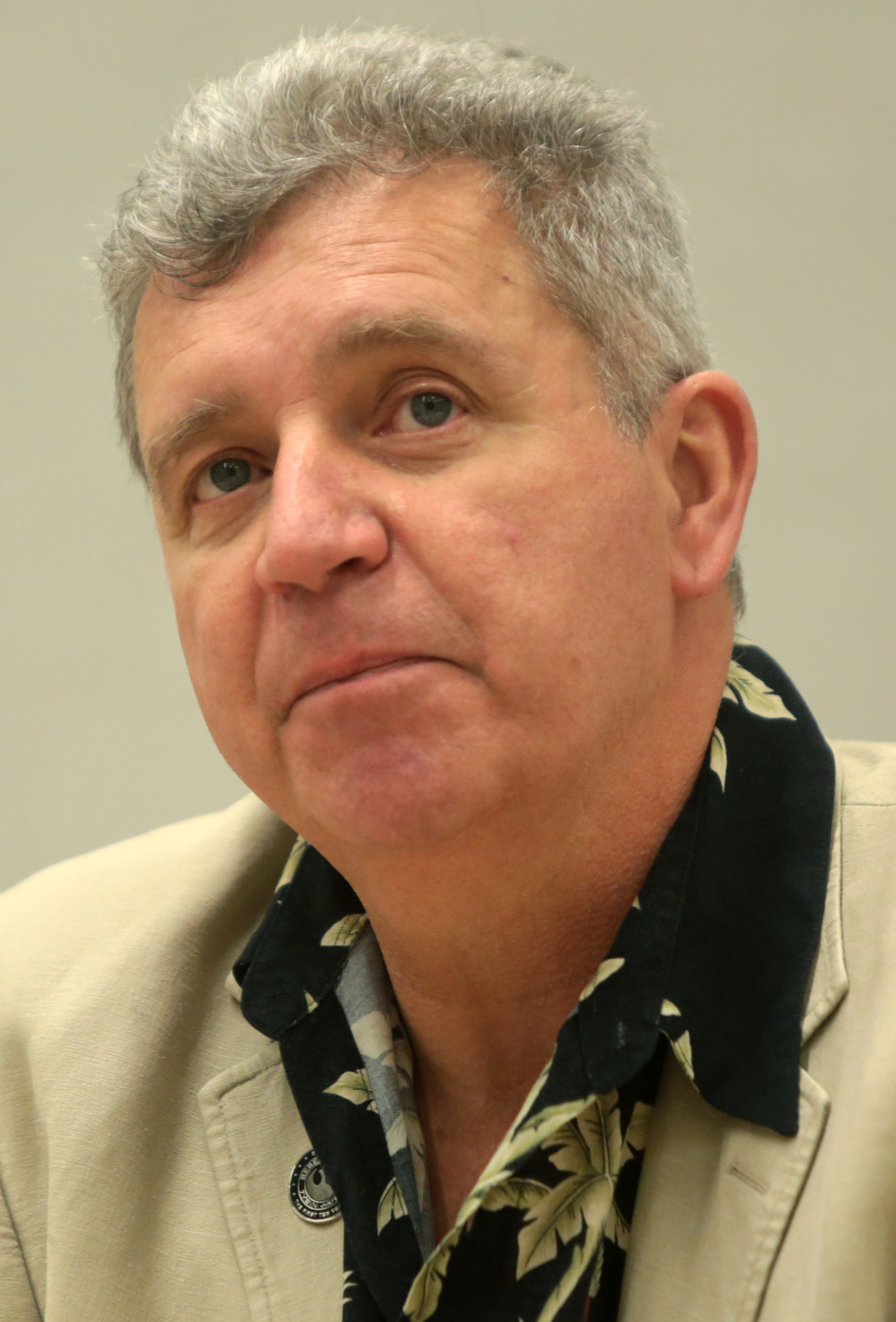
Timothy Rose, pictured here in 2016, portrayed Ackbar in all three Star Wars films.

Timothy Rose had been a puppeteer working on several projects for The Jim Henson Company (including The Dark Crystal), when Jim Henson directed him and others from the company to work on Return of the Jedi. He was not originally hired to portray Admiral Ackbar, but instead to help build and operate the Sy Snootles puppet for the Max Rebo Band, which performs at the palace of the alien crime lord Jabba the Hutt. While backstage at the workshop where several alien puppets were stored, Rose saw Ackbar's sculpt on a display stand and asked Phil Tippett if he could play the part. Tippett told him it was a background character, and Rose did not know Ackbar would play a major supporting role in the film. He only asked to portray him because he liked the look of the character, and said he was "thinking he was going to be in the third row in a new cantina sequence or something". Rose was not required to audition for the part of Ackbar before being given the role.

Rose returned to portray Ackbar in The Force Awakens and The Last Jedi. Each day he was provided with pages from the script only for the specific scenes that were being shot, so he knew little about the final role Ackbar would play in the films until shooting took place. Rose was frustrated by the amount of secrecy on the set, which he felt prevented him and the other actors from having everything they needed to do their jobs as well as possible. Many of Ackbar's scenes were cut from the first film, which Rose said was a disappointment to him "after waiting 30 years to reprise Ackbar". After the character's scenes in The Last Jedi were complete, the crew took footage of Rose in the Ackbar's costume saying "It's a wrap", a reference to the character's death and his famous "It's a trap" line. That shot was featured in behind-the-scenes footage shown at the 2017 D23 Expo. Although intended as a joke, Rose found the gesture offensive and said he was "in tears in the suit".

=== Erik Bauersfeld ===
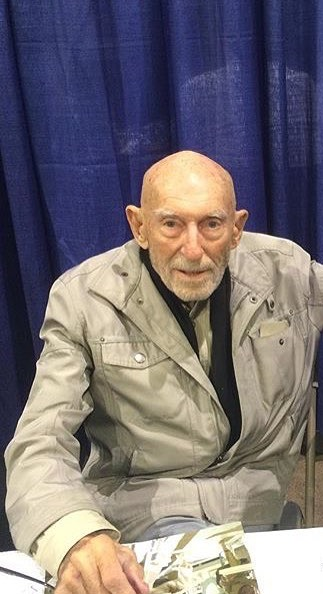
Erik Bauersfeld, pictured here in 2015, provided the voice of Ackbar in Return of the Jedi and The Force Awakens.

The voice of Admiral Ackbar in Return of the Jedi was performed by Erik Bauersfeld, a radio dramatist who also voiced the alien character Bib Fortuna in the film, and had unsuccessfully auditioned to voice Yoda in The Empire Strikes Back. He was cast after Star Wars sound designer Ben Burtt approached him in 1983, while Bauersfeld was producing a radio drama with Lucasfilm sound designer Randy Thom and suggested he audition for the part of Ackbar. The recording session took one hour, and Bauersfeld made up the voice on the spot after looking at a photograph of Ackbar, without having any other information about the character. According to Bauersfeld: "I saw the face, and I knew what he must sound like."

Bauersfeld did not receive an on-screen credit for his roles as Ackbar and Bib Fortuna, and his association with the characters was unknown for years after the film was released. In a 1999 interview, Timothy Rose said he did not know who provided the voice, and thought it was possible that it was his own voice modified with a synthesizer. Eventually fans learned Bauersfeld played the parts and he began to receive multiple fan letters every week, which continued for the rest of his life: he was described as "flattered but a bit perplexed" by the continuing attention for performing Ackbar. Bauersfeld said he appreciated the passion of fans and responded to every autograph request, but that he was not particularly knowledgeable about Star Wars himself; in 2011 interview, he said he had not seen Return of the Jedi since it first came out, still had not seen the first Star Wars film, and had trouble imitating Ackbar's voice because he could not remember what it sounded like.

Bauersfeld reprised the role in the 1993 computer game Star Wars: X-Wing. Film director J. J. Abrams requested that Bauersfeld once again play Ackbar in the 2015 film Star Wars: The Force Awakens. It was Bauersfeld's final role before his death in April 2016.

=== Other performers ===
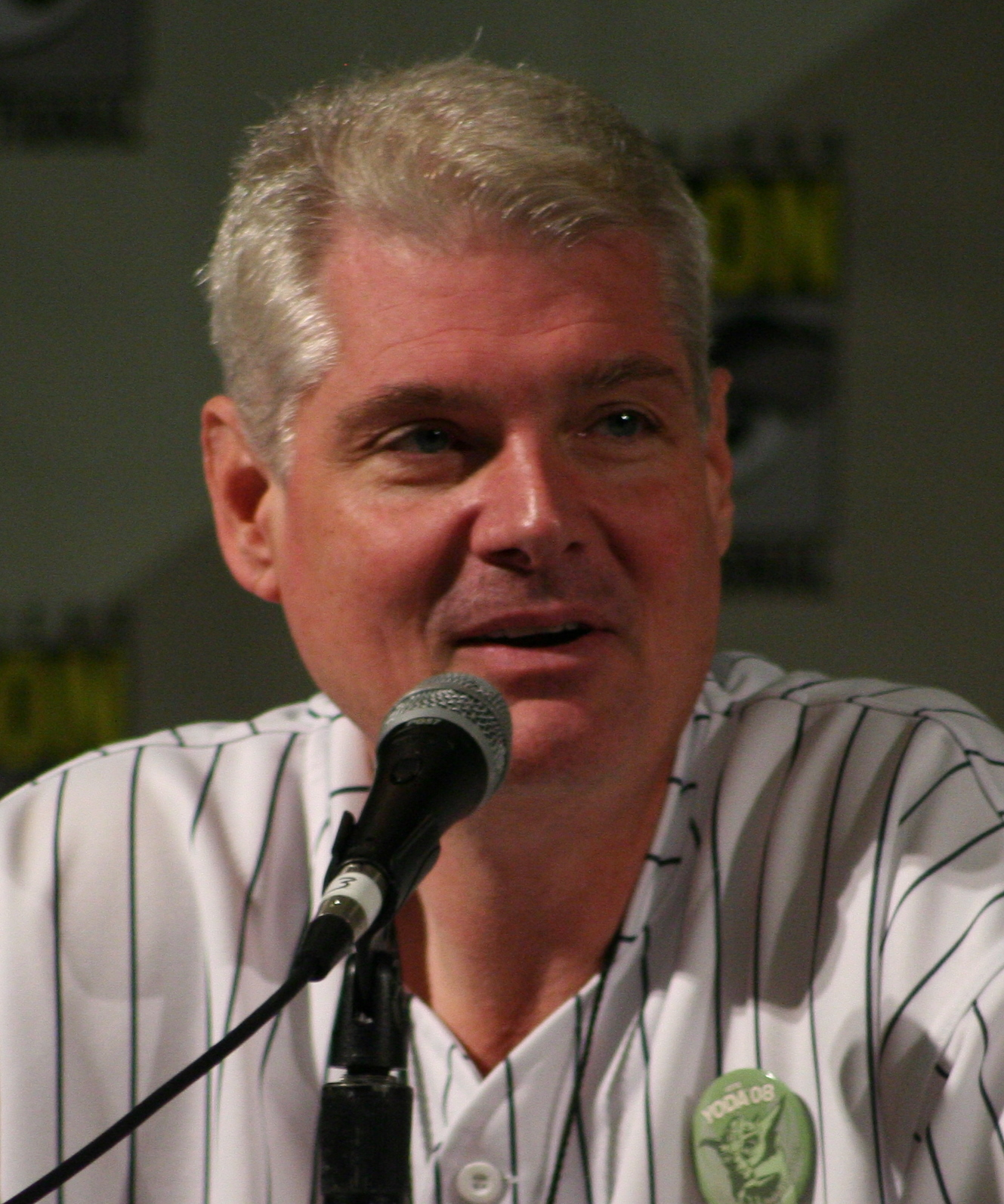
Tom Kane, pictured here in 2008, voiced Ackbar in The Last Jedi and other works of Star Wars media.

Bauersfield was replaced by Tom Kane in The Last Jedi. Kane has portrayed Ackbar in several other works of Star Wars media, including the 2004 and 2015 versions of Star Wars: Battlefront, the video game Lego Star Wars: The Force Awakens (2016), and the Disney attraction Star Tours – The Adventures Continue. Voice actor Artt Butler, who was a fan of Ackbar ever since watching the Star Wars films as a child, portrayed the character in the television series The Clone Wars. Dave Filoni, supervising director for the series, said the staff debated whether the younger version of Ackbar would still have the same "iconic voice" as in Return of the Jedi or whether he would sound different on the show, but they ultimately went with a similar-sounding voice.

Breckin Meyer portrayed Ackbar in the Robot Chicken: Star Wars series, a Star Wars-themed version of the stop motion sketch comedy television series Robot Chicken on Adult Swim dedicated entirely to Star Wars parodies. Meyer, who also wrote for the series, called voicing Ackbar "my favorite (experience) in the history of the world". Meyer said he tries to mimic Ackbar's voice from Return of the Jedi as best he can, but that the humor comes through because "the actual voice is just funny". Robot Chicken co-creator Seth Green said of Meyer's performance: "When Breckin does Ackbar, it splits me every time. No matter what he says, it's always funny."

== Cultural impact ==
=== Critical reception ===
Despite his small role in Return of the Jedi, Admiral Ackbar is considered a fan favorite among Star Wars characters. Dave Filoni, a Lucasfilm animation producer who has worked on several Star Wars television shows, said of the character: "Ackbar has a crazy level of fame for the amount of time he's spent onscreen. It's the Boba Fett phenomenon, where you've got a character who doesn't really do a lot, but is so beloved that it eventually spreads outside the realm of fandom." He was ranked No. 16 in a 1998 list of the "Top 20 Star Wars Characters" featured in the magazine Star Wars Insider. That same issue included a separate list ranking the characters based on an index that accounted for their popularity ranking in proportion to the number of lines they speak in the films, to "take into consideration the amount of dialogue a character had to make an impression on fans". With only 14 lines in Return of the Jedi, Ackbar ranked third on that list, behind only Boba Fett and Wedge Antilles. Ackbar was also ranked No. 12 in The Daily Telegraph's ranking of 66 characters from the franchise, No. 14 in The Huffington Post's ranking of 93 characters, No. 21 on IGN's list of the Top 25 Star Wars Heroes, and No. 19 in USA Today's ranking of 75 characters.

Scott Chernoff, a writer for Star Wars Insider, called Ackbar's character "one of the most visually striking and memorable characters introduced in the final installment of the saga". Chernoff added that Ackbar performer Timothy Rose was one of the most-requested subjects by readers for his magazine column interviewing Star Wars actors. The Independent writer Christopher Hooton called Ackbar "easily the best character from the original Star Wars films". Jonathan Wilkins, editor at large for Star Wars Insider, called Ackbar "an iconic figure in the Star Wars universe, despite the fact that he had just a handful of lines in Return of the Jedi. Steve Tilley of The Edmonton Sun wrote, "He was so funny-looking yet somehow authoritative and almost regal, though, that he was impossible not to love." Rebecca Hawkes of The Daily Telegraph credited Erik Bauersfeld in particular with "bringing the much-loved Ackbar to life, imbuing the fish-eyed orange monster with a voice, a forceful personality, and a lasting cult appeal". During the 2000 United States presidential election, several websites were established jokingly proposing Admiral Ackbar as a write-in candidate for president.

=== "It's a trap!" ===
Admiral Ackbar's line, "It's a trap!", which he says during the Battle of Endor in Return of the Jedi, became one of the most famous and beloved lines from the original Star Wars trilogy. The line has become a popular Internet meme, with The Independent calling him "perhaps the franchise's most memed character". More than 1,000 fan videos have been created on the video-sharing website YouTube featuring or parodying Ackbar and that line of dialogue, including trap music and techno remixes built around it. The line did not appear in the original script for Return of the Jedi, and instead was first written as "It's a trick!", but it was changed in post-production after the filmmakers decided it was not as effective a line as they had originally hoped.

Erik Bauersfeld said of the line: "The fans who write say they'll never forget 'It's a trap!' I don't even remember how I said it." International Business Times writer Amy West said the line has "become somewhat cult-like in the eyes of the Star Wars fanbase". Ben Sherlock of Screen Rant called the line "one of the most memorable quotes in the saga's history, for reasons that are unknown yet somehow obvious, and it immortalized what could've been a forgettable character". Renaldo Matadeen of Comic Book Resources called the line "a pop culture touchstone".

Footage of Ackbar reciting the line was featured on both Comedy Central comedy shows The Daily Show and The Colbert Report on February 11, 2010, alongside clips of various Republican Party politicians insisting a White House invitation by President Barack Obama was a trap. "It's a Trap!", the 2011 episode of the animated comedy series Family Guy spoofing Return of the Jedi, took its name from Ackbar's famous line; Ackbar himself makes an appearance in the episode, portrayed by the character Klaus Heissler – a talking goldfish – from the animated series American Dad!. Additionally, a smartphone app was developed with the sole purpose of playing Ackbar's "It's a trap!" line whenever the user pushes a button.

In 2018, the comic strip story in which Ackbar made his debut in 1982 was retroactively titled after the character's famous line.

=== Response to Ackbar's death ===
Several fans expressed disappointment with Ackbar's sudden death in The Last Jedi, calling it abrupt and unceremonious. Fans particularly criticized that Ackbar was only featured in the background of the shot where he dies, with the camera focused primarily on Leia Organa, and that his death is mentioned only in passing by other characters later. Screen Rant writer Ben Sherlock wrote of Ackbar's death: "It was such a fleeting moment that many fans didn't even realize it had happened. They looked down for one second to get a handful of popcorn, and when they looked back up, Ackbar was gone". Nate Jones of New York magazine's website Vulture, called the death scene "disrespectful" and "unfathomably rude", and that Ackbar "deserved better than to go out in a throwaway moment".

Ackbar actors Tim Rose and Tom Kane also said they were disappointed with how the character's death was handled. Rose hoped Ackbar would have a more substantial role in The Last Jedi than he had in the latter film, and was unhappy the character again received little screen time and was abruptly killed. Rose said: "Each day I would come to work going, 'Is today the day when Ackbar gets something a bit more involving?' And I looked at my script and I went, 'Oh, Ackbar's going out of the window. Well, that's that then!'". Kane likewise thought the death scene was poorly handled, and believed Ackbar should have been given the larger role in The Last Jedi that went to Vice-Admiral Amilyn Holdo, a new character played by Laura Dern. The Last Jedi editor Bob Ducsay said he was also disappointed with how the scene was handled, saying it was "slightly incidental", though he said the scene was intentionally designed that way and he did not come to have second thoughts about it until after watching the completed film. Gary Whitta, who co-wrote the story for the film Rogue One and wrote several other Star Wars projects, said he was saddened by how quickly Ackbar died.

Others defended the way Ackbar's character was killed. Alex Leadbeater, features editor of the website Screen Rant, felt the scene was widely misunderstood by fans and served to advance the storyline, particularly to establish the ensuing conflict between Holdo and Resistance pilot Poe Dameron. Leadbeater wrote: "Ackbar had no place in The Last Jedi's narrative. ... You can argue he should have had a greater send off (but) it must be said that to do so would undercut the entire set piece." In The Last Jedi episode of the comedic animated webseries How It Should Have Ended, which parodies and reimagines aspects of popular films, Ackbar's character survives the bridge attack after claiming he has to go to the bathroom at the time the bridge is shot, and he assumes control of the Resistance afterward.

=== Cultural references ===
The first Admiral Ackbar action figure was released in 1983, the same year as Return of the Jedi. In 1996, Ackbar was one of the Star Wars characters to receive its own Micro Machines mini-transforming playsets by Galoob. The toy line included miniature versions of the head of each character, which opened to reveal a small set from the film and a figurine of the character itself. The Ackbar playset was sold as part of a collection that also included an Boba Fett and a Gamorrean guard. A Lego figurine of Ackbar was created and released as part of multiple Lego Star Wars toy sets, including with the Lego Home One Calamari cruiser in 2009, the Lego A-Wing Starfighter in 2013, and the Lego Resistance Troop Transporter in 2015. Ackbar's full-sized costume from Return of the Jedi was featured in a 200-piece exhibition of Star Wars costumes, props, and other memorabilia at the Smithsonian Institution called "Star Wars: The Magic of Myth". The exhibit opened at the Washington, D.C. museum complex in 1997 and later went on a national tour that lasted until 2002 and visited various museums, including the San Diego Museum of Art, the Minneapolis Institute of Arts, the Field Museum of Natural History in Chicago, the Museum of Fine Arts, Houston, the Toledo Museum of Art, and the Brooklyn Museum.

Ackbar has repeatedly appeared in the Robot Chicken: Star Wars series, most prominently featured in a sketch portraying a commercial for "Admiral Ackbar Cereal", with Ackbar presenting the breakfast cereal to two children and declaring, "Your tongues can't repel flavor of that magnitude!", a spoof of his line from Return of the Jedi. Several additional Ackbar skits were conceived but never completed, including one in which he is a Costco greeter, and another in which he contracts gonorrhea from a stripper and is told by a doctor "It's the clap!", in reference to Ackbar's famous line "It's a trap!" The "It's a trap!" line was also referenced on the television comedy show The Big Bang Theory. Ackbar was featured in a 2009 CollegeHumor video called "Ackbar! The Star Wars Talk Show", where he played the host of a talk show similar to The Jerry Springer Show. Morgan Phillips, an independent hip hop musician and disc jockey, included a song about the character called "Admiral Ackbar Please" on his album Star Wars Breakbeats.

In 2010, when the University of Mississippi began a process to find a new mascot to replace Colonel Reb, students Matthew Henry, Tyler Craft, Joseph Katool, and Ben McMurtray started a campaign to have Admiral Ackbar selected. Although their efforts started out as a joke, some students began to seriously push for the idea, while others strongly opposed it and felt it was an embarrassment for the university. Some students went so far as threatening to transfer out of the school if he was chosen, and some prospective parents said they would not let their children attend there. The campaign quickly went viral and received national news media attention. Lucasfilm ultimately declined to give the school the rights to use the character, and issued a tongue-in-cheek statement about the matter which read: "The last time we checked in with Admiral Ackbar he was leading the Rebel Alliance Fleet on a critical mission so it will be difficult for him to show up for the games." A black bear was instead chosen as the new mascot.
