= Erik Bauersfeld =

American radio dramatist and voice actor

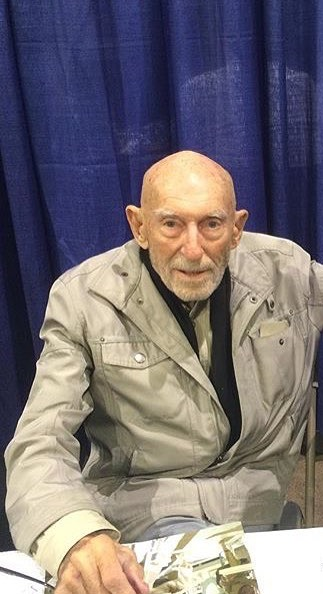
- Bauersfeld at Rhode Island Comic Con in 2015
- Born: June 28, 1922; Brooklyn, New York City, U.S.
- Died: April 3, 2016 (aged 93); Berkeley, California, U.S.
- Occupations: Radio dramatist, voice actor
- Years active: 1961–2015

Erik Bauersfeld (June 28, 1922 – April 3, 2016) was an American radio dramatist and voice actor.

He worked at radio station KPFA-FM over 30 years, where he created The Black Mass, a horror radio series. He was also noted for providing the voices of Admiral Ackbar and Bib Fortuna in Return of the Jedi (1983), the third film of the original Star Wars trilogy. He subsequently reprised the Ackbar role in Star Wars: The Force Awakens (2015).

== Early life ==
Bauersfeld was attracted to radio work at a very young age. During World War II, he served in the United States Navy. His post-secondary education included time studying at Cooper Union in New York, and then at the University of California, Berkeley, where he concentrated on aesthetics and painting.

== Career ==
Bauersfeld was teaching at the San Francisco Art Institute, when he began working at Pacifica Radio station KPFA-FM in Berkeley, beginning in 1961. He served as the Director of KPFA's Drama and Literature Department for 31 years. While at KPFA, he created and starred in the 1960s radio horror series The Black Mass. Outside of radio, he dabbled in voiceover work in films and video games. Severe stage fright prevented his planned career in theatre or live action film, but Bauersfeld found voice and radio work more rewarding.

Bauersfeld was working for Lucasfilm on a radio project, with sound designer Randy Thom, when eventually he was approached by Star Wars sound designer Ben Burtt to perform voice work for Return of the Jedi. Burtt asked him to read for the part of Ackbar. According to Bauersfeld, he was shown a picture of Ackbar and instantly created the character's voice. Ackbar's lines, including the memorable exclamation "It's a trap!", took an hour for Bauersfeld to record. He then spent an additional 30 minutes reading for the voice of Bib Fortuna who spoke entirely in a fictional language. Bauersfeld initially received no screen credit, but he recalls fans of the Star Wars films eventually identified him as the uncredited voice actor. He was respectful of the Star Wars films and their devoted fan base, but also said he had not watched Return of the Jedi since its original release and was described as "flattered but a bit perplexed" by the continuing attention for performing Ackbar.

He had earlier read for the part of Yoda in The Empire Strikes Back, a role that eventually went to puppeteer Frank Oz.

He also voiced several characters in the 1979 Highbridge audio productions of The Hobbit and The Lord of the Rings.

Bauersfeld reprised his role as the voice of Admiral Ackbar in several video games (including Star Wars: X-Wing and Star Wars Battlefront: Elite Squadron), as well as in Star Wars: The Force Awakens. Following his death in 2016, the role of Ackbar was taken over by veteran Star Wars voice actor Tom Kane for Star Wars: The Last Jedi.

== Personal life and death ==
He was a close friend of poet and activist Lawrence Ferlinghetti. In 2015, he attended the Star Wars Celebration at Anaheim.

Bauersfeld died at his home in Berkeley, California, on 3 April 2016, at the age of 93.

== Filmography ==
=== Films ===
Year	Title	Role	Notes	Ref.
1983	Return of the Jedi	Admiral Gial Ackbar / Bib Fortuna (voice)		
2001	A.I. Artificial Intelligence	Gardener (voice)		
2015	Crimson Peak	Additional voices		
2015	Star Wars: The Force Awakens	Admiral Gial Ackbar (voice)	Final film role	

=== Video games ===
Year	Title	Voice role	Ref.
1993	Star Wars: X-Wing	Admiral Gial Ackbar	
2009	Star Wars Battlefront: Elite Squadron	Admiral Gial Ackbar	
