= Vybarr Cregan-Reid =

British author, academic and broadcaster

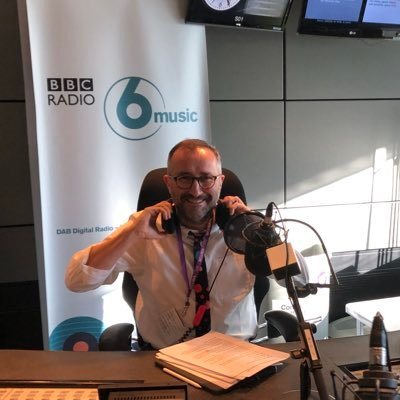
Vybarr Cregan-Reid recording at the BBC World Service

Vybarr Cregan-Reid (/ˈvaɪbɑː ˌkriːɡənˈriːd/ VYE-bar KREE-gən-REED; born 1969) is a British author and academic. He works at York St John University. He is the author of Footnotes: How Running Makes us Human (2016), and Primate Change: How the World We Made is Remaking Us (2018) and We Are What We Read: a life within and without books (2024). Before that, he published Discovering Gilgamesh: Geology, Narrative & the Historical Sublime in Victorian Culture (2013). He has appeared on Sky and ITV, and made programmes for the BBC. His work has been translated into twelve languages.

== Education and career ==
Cregan-Reid grew up in Manchester and studied English at the University of Sussex. He did a two-year Leverhulme Research Fellowship at Sussex from 2004–2006. He currently works at York St John University.

== Books ==
- Discovering Gilgamesh: Geology, Narrative & the Historical Sublime in Victorian Culture (2013) is an academic monograph on the impact that the rediscovery of The Epic of Gilgamesh made in 1872.
- Footnotes: How Running Makes us Human (2016), is a blend of memoir, literary criticism and nature-writing. It looks at humans' relationship with running, what running means, what it does for us and where it came from, and asks why we run. It was widely praised by critics and readers. The Washington Post, described it as 'accessible and thought-provoking’ and compares it to the writing of the novelist Haruki Murakami.
- Primate Change: How the World We Made is Remaking Us (2018) is a wide-ranging, polemical look at how and why the human body has changed since humankind first got up on two feet. Spanning the entirety of human history—from primate to transhuman—the book investigates where we came from, who we are today and how modern technology will change us beyond recognition. The Guardian called it "a work of remarkable scope". It was a Science 'Book of the Year' in the Financial Times, and Christmas Pick for The Mail. It has been translated into 7 languages.
- We Are What We Read: a life within and without books (2024) - a memoir about education and the war on the humanities (2024).

== Journalism and radio ==
As a journalist, Vybarr Cregan-Reid has written widely on the subjects of literature, nature, health and the environment. He has had work commissioned by The Barbican and the British Council. He has written for The Guardian, The Observer, The Daily Telegraph, The Daily Mail, The Sunday Times, The Literary Review, The I, Wanderlust, The Big Issue and Countryfile. He has hosted live radio on BBC Radio 5Live, read his work and been interviewed a number of times of BBC Radio 3 and BBC Radio 4. He has also been on radio stations throughout the world such as NPR and Canadian CBC. He has also written and presented two series for the BBC World Service, Changing World, Changing Bodies, which looked at how different parts of the modern body (like feet, backs, and faces) are changing in different parts of the world. The second series looked at how modern life affects sleep, how it has driven our height, and longevity.
