= A Warning to the Curious =

1925 short story by M. R. James

- Short story by M. R. James
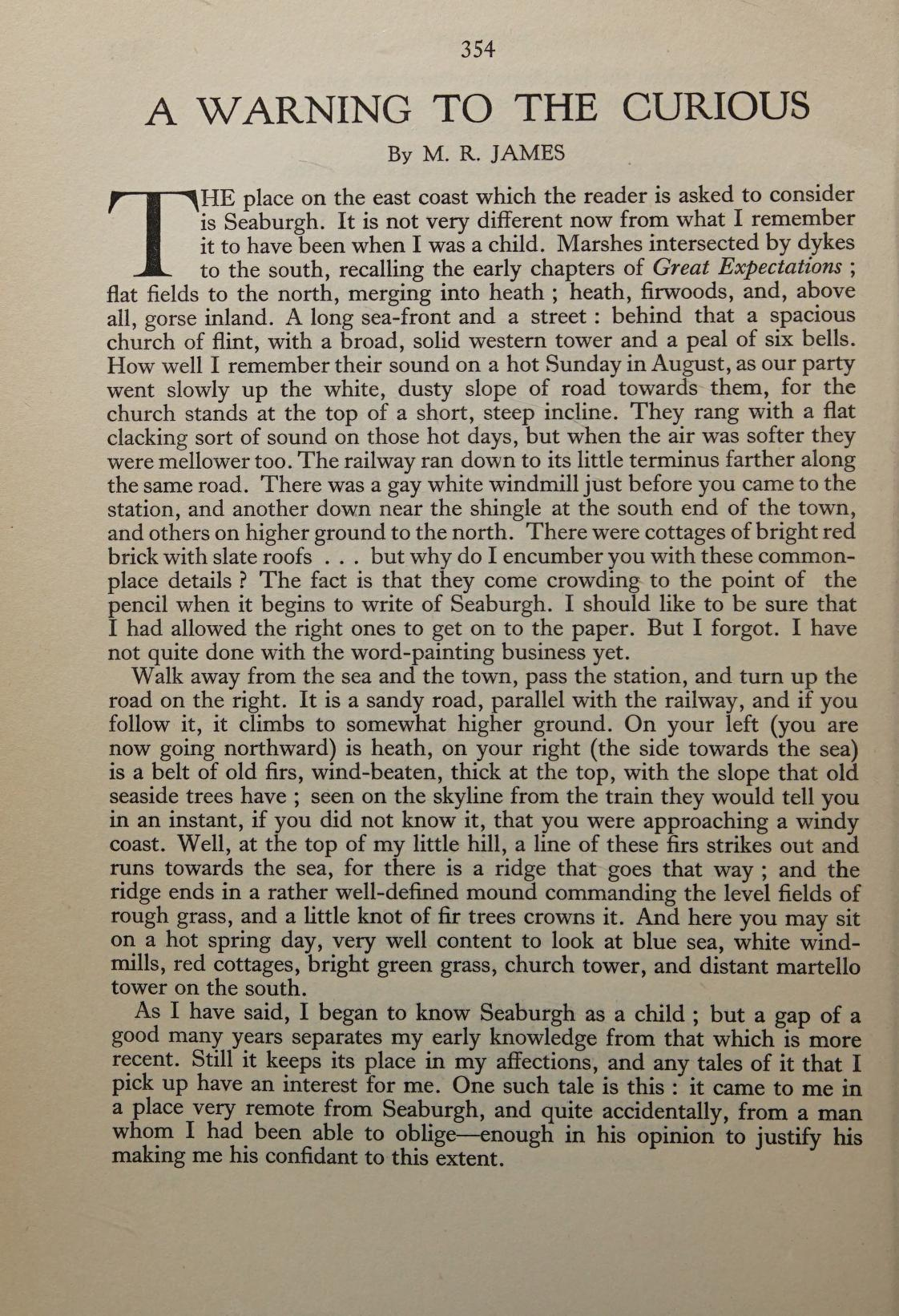
- The first page of "A Warning to the Curious" by M. R. James as it originally appeared in the London Mercury.

Text available at Wikisource
- Country: United Kingdom
- Language: English
- Genre: Horror

Publication
- Published in: London Mercury
- Publication date: August 1925

"A Warning to the Curious" is a ghost story by English writer M. R. James, first published in the London Mercury in August 1925 and collected in James' book A Warning to the Curious and Other Ghost Stories that same year. The tale tells the story of Paxton, an antiquarian and archaeologist who holidays in "Seaburgh" (a disguised version of Aldeburgh, Suffolk) and inadvertently stumbles across one of the three lost crowns of East Anglia, which legendarily protect the country from invasion. Upon digging up the crown, Paxton is stalked by its supernatural guardian. Written a few years after the end of the First World War, "A Warning to the Curious" ranks as one of M. R. James's bleakest stories.

== Summary ==
The story is written in James's typical style, and uses a multi-layered narrative device to tell the tale. Time is taken to describe a pleasant traditional Victorian holiday resort, Seaburgh. The narrator states that he collects stories about the area as a result of his happy memories there as a child, and that this is one he was told by a man for whom he had done a favour.

We now hear the story first-hand from the second narrator, who describes being on holiday at Seaburgh some years earlier with his friend, Henry Long, when they are approached by another guest, Paxton, who has a tale of woe to tell.

Paxton explains that he has some interest in the architecture of medieval churches, and whilst visiting one such place he learns of a local legend about a buried Anglo-Saxon crown that protects the country from invasion; linked to this are a deceased family, called Ager, who were sworn to guard the crown.

Paxton states that he found and exhumed the crown but has been stalked ever since, to the point of desperation, by its supernatural guardian. Both the narrator and Long are moved by Paxton's story, and decide to help him return the crown. During their successful mission, both men have some appreciation of being under surveillance by a supernatural presence.

The next day the narrator and Long are to meet Paxton for a walk, but discover him gone; a servant states that she saw Paxton running towards the beach, having heard his friends call for him. The two men set off after Paxton onto the beach, where a thick sea mist descends, making visibility poor; they also notice two sets of footprints in the sand, one wearing shoes and the other being "the track of a bare foot, and one that showed more bones than flesh". The two men finally come across the body of Paxton, who has met a violent end. An independent witness at the subsequent inquest absolves them of any involvement. The narrator states that he and Long resolved to keep the location of the crown secret, finishing by saying that he has never been back to, or even near, Seaburgh since.

== Publication ==
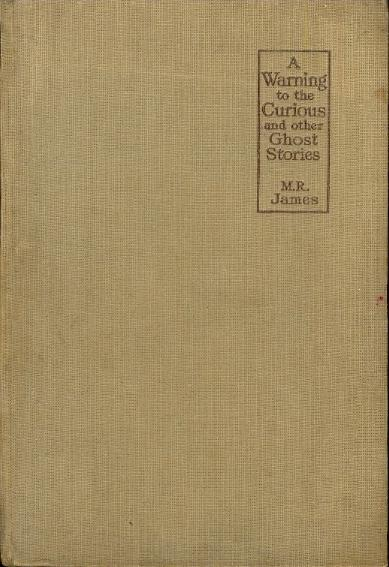
"A Warning to the Curious" was collected in James' book A Warning to the Curious and Other Ghost Stories in 1925

"A Warning to the Curious" was first published in volume XII, number 70 of the London Mercury in August 1925. It was collected in James' book A Warning to the Curious and Other Ghost Stories later that year.

== Reception ==
Bob Hodges offers "A Warning to the Curious" as an example of how "James's post-World War I stories largely surrendered his occasional prior interest in French and Scandinavian settings, and James's fiction turned to an English setting eerie with hidden landscapes and threatening yet never fully apprehensible history".

== Adaptations ==
On 10 December 1954, BBC Home Service Midland broadcast a radio version of "A Warning to the Curious", adapted by documentary maker Philip Donnellan.

In 1972, the story was adapted as A Warning to the Curious by Lawrence Gordon Clark as the second instalment of the BBC's A Ghost Story for Christmas strand. As with the previous instalment, it was first broadcast on BBC 1 at 11pm on Christmas Eve. In adapting the story, Clark changed the protagonist of the original from a young, innocent amateur who discovers the crown by accident to a middle-aged man (Peter Vaughan) who travels to Seaburgh specifically to find the crown. The era is updated to the 1930s, the background of the Depression adding an extra layer to Paxton's search for the treasure. The narrative layering of the original James story is dispensed with and a chronological narrative is used instead. Clark also included the character of Dr. Black (Clive Swift), who first appeared in The Stalls of Barchester. The adaptation was filmed around the north Norfolk coastline at Waxham, Happisburgh and Wells-next-the-Sea.

In 1986, Argo Records released a double audio cassette titled A Warning to the Curious featuring unabridged James stories narrated by Michael Hordern.

In March 1992, ISIS Audio Books released a collection of unabridged James stories narrated by Nigel Lambert titled A Warning to the Curious and Other Tales.

In 2000, a dramatized narration of the story with Sir Christopher Lee as James was produced by BBC Scotland as part of the series Christopher Lee's Ghost Stories For Christmas, adapted by Ronald Frame.

In December 2007, BBC Radio 4's Woman's Hour Drama programme presented an original Jamesian drama, A Warning to the Furious.

On 13 June 2011, BBC Radio 3's programme Twenty Minutes, an "eclectic arts magazine programme", featured a version of "A Warning to the Curious" read by Alex Jennings and based on a script produced and abridged by Justine Willett.

In December 2018, BBC Radio 4's 15 Minute Drama introduced a new series, The Haunting of M. R. James. Five of James's short stories were adapted by Neil Brand, including "A Warning to the Curious".

In 2020, the story was adapted by Shadows at the Door: The Podcast into a full-cast audio drama. In this adaptation, Paxton's gender was changed from male to female and the character of the narrator was expanded. Later into 2021 an updated version of this story entitled 'A Curious Tale' was made by an independent outfit and subsequently won three awards. The story was slightly changed whereby the protagonist was a musician seeking the fabled crown whilst on an archaeological break, which was set in the fictitious Sussex village of Snowgood. In 2023 the creator of 'A Curious Tale' made a full length film version of the story, 'The Presence of Snowgood', changing the protagonist to a private detective.

== Aldeburgh ==
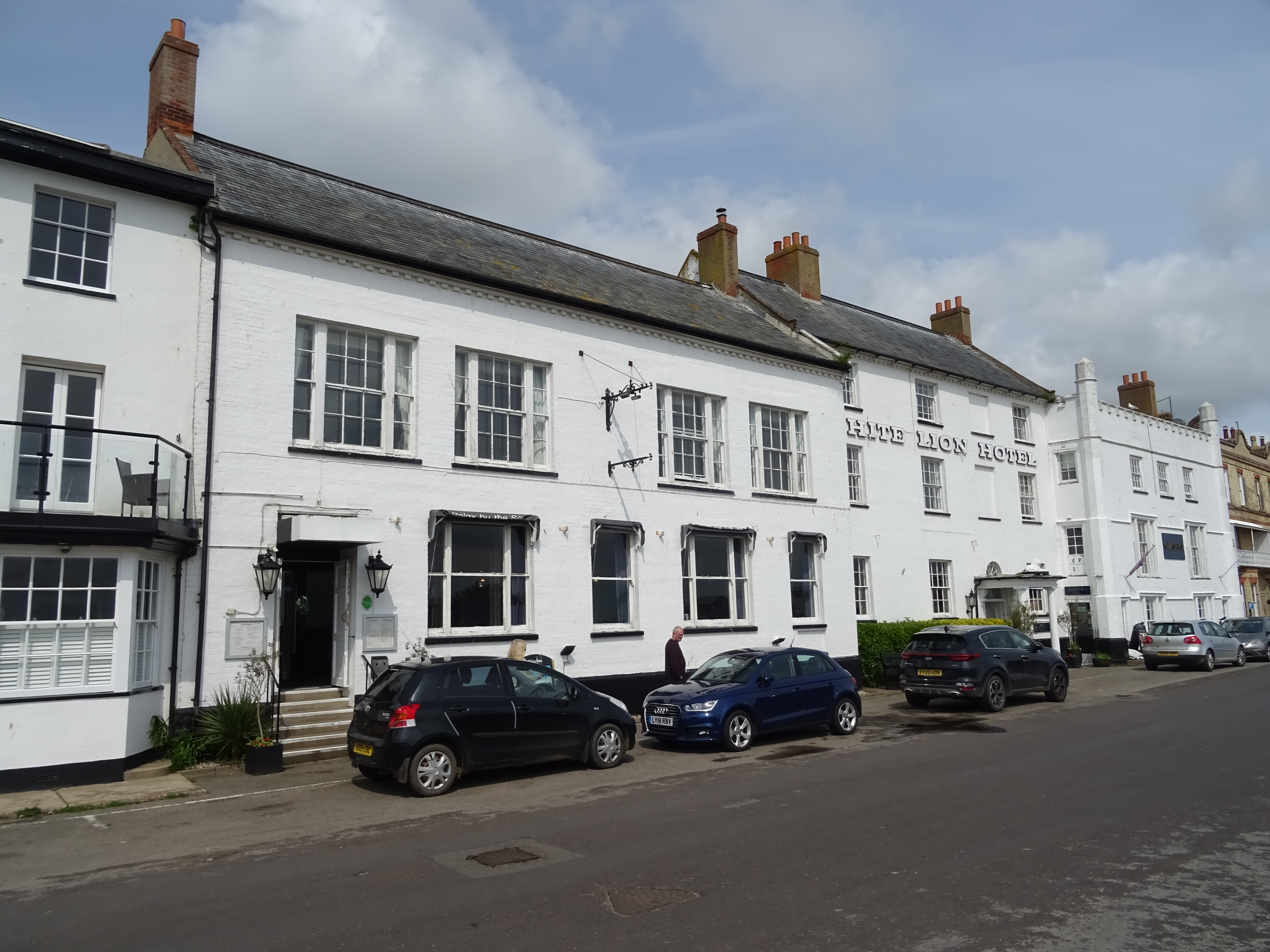
The White Lion hotel in Aldeburgh, the inspiration for "The Bear", the hotel where the protagonists stay.

The Suffolk setting of Seaburgh for "A Warning to the Curious" is a thinly veiled disguise for the seaside town of Aldeburgh, the home of M. R. James's maternal grandmother, whom he visited frequently until her death in 1870. The town suffers from the coastal erosion common to the east coast, but the majority of buildings mentioned in the story survive to this day; the Martello tower still stands and has been converted into a holiday residence by The Landmark Trust. The hotel where the characters stay, "The Bear", is a "thinly disguised" facsimile of the White Lion hotel in Aldeburgh. The White Lion hotel is a luxury hotel still, St Peter and St Paul's Church, Aldeburgh and the accompanying path through the graveyard similarly are relatively untouched. A few miles outside Aldeburgh is the small village of Friston, which is home to a church dating back to the medieval period and is likely the basis for Froston in the story, though it lacks the Three Crown motif.
