= Mr. Humphreys and His Inheritance =

- Short story by M.R. James
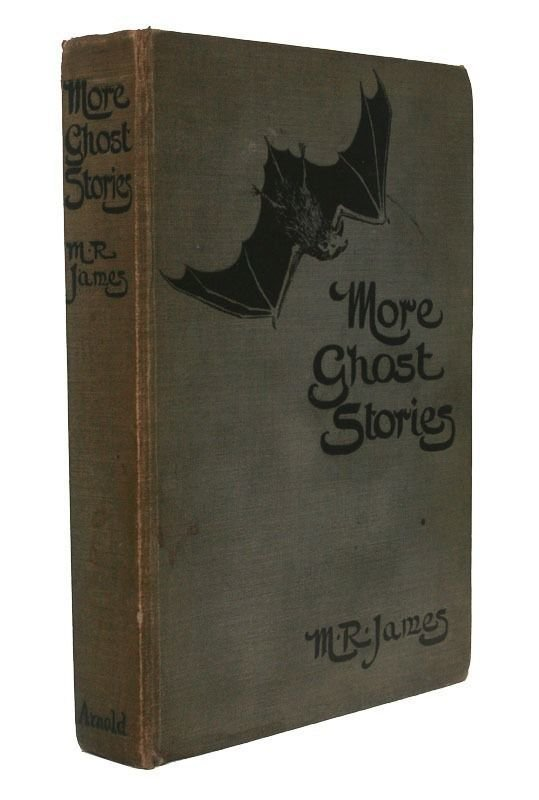
- "Mr. Humphreys and His Inheritance" was published in More Ghost Stories of an Antiquary in 1911

Text available at Wikisource
- Country: England
- Language: English
- Genre: Horror

Publication
- Published in: More Ghost Stories of an Antiquary
- Publisher: Edward Arnold
- Media type: Print (hardback)
- Publication date: 1911

"Mr. Humphreys and His Inheritance" is a ghost story by English writer M. R. James, included in his 1911 collection More Ghost Stories of an Antiquary.

== Plot summary ==
After inheriting an estate from his uncle, Mr. Humphreys relocates to Wilsthorpe, Eastern England to become a country gentleman. While touring the grounds of his new home with Mr. Cooper, the farm bailiff, Humphreys observes two unusual features: a marble "Temple of Friendship" containing stone blocks, and a locked yew hedge maze bearing the motto "Secretum meum mihi et filiis domus meae". (Note: Latin for "My secret is for me and the sons of my house".) Breaking the lock of the maze, Humphreys makes his way to the centre, where he finds a stone column bearing a copper globe. Cooper remarks that it is likely 30 to 40 years since anyone has entered the maze, and recounts an episode when Humphreys' uncle politely refused entry to Lady Wardrop, a maze enthusiast.

That evening, Humphreys explores the house's library. Browsing through the books, he finds a quarto of sermons from the late-seventeenth century. The quarto contains a parable in which a man enters a labyrinth in search of a jewel. After retrieving the jewel, the man remarks "I have brought back that with it that will leave me neither Rest at Night nor Pleasure by Day."

The next day, Cooper's wife and daughter visit the maze, but Humphreys finds himself unable to lead them to the centre. That same evening, he re-enters the maze and immediately finds his way to the middle. Returning to the maze the next day, Humphreys examines the copper globe, which he finds to be hollow, and engraved with "an assemblage of the patriarchs of evil, perhaps not uninfluenced by a study of Dante", including Absolon, Cain, Chore, and Hostanes. Humphreys speculates that his uncle brought the globe back from Italy. He is joined in the centre of the maze by Cooper, who remarks that the globe is hot to the touch, which Humphreys does not experience. The following evening, while looking out his bedroom window, Humphreys makes note of a small Irish yew incongruously located in the shrubbery in front of the maze. However, on the following night, he notes that the yew tree "was not really so obtrusive as he had fancied", but instead observes "a clump of dark growth" against the wall of the house.

Humphreys hosts a visit by Lady Wardrop, who is publishing a book of mazes. She deduces that the maze was built in 1780, and suggests that the stone blocks in the Temple of Friendship may be markers that were removed from the maze. After reaching the centre of the maze, Lady Wardrop remarks "haven't you felt ever since you came in here—that a watch is being kept on us, and that if we overstepped the mark in any way there would be a—well, a pounce? No? I do; and I don't care how soon we are outside the gate."

That evening, Humphreys sits in the library preparing a plan of the maze. While working with the window open, he has a sensation of "not a bat, but something more considerable—that had a mind to join him". Tracing the path to the centre of the maze on his drawing, Humphreys observes a hole that inexplicably "seemed to go not only through the paper, but through the table on which it lay. Yes, and through the floor below that, down, and still down, even into infinite depths." Gazing into the hole, Humphreys sees a creature with a "burnt human face" climbing towards him; as the creature prepares to grasp him, Humphreys throws himself back and knocks himself unconscious.

After recovering, Humphreys orders that the copper globe be opened up; his doctor tells him that the globe was half full of ashes from a cremation. Humphreys has the maze destroyed, and goes on to marry Lady Wardrop's niece. The quarto containing the parable is found to be mysteriously missing. Humphreys learns that his ancestor James Wilson, who built the maze and temple, had left a strangely generous legacy to his Italian servant. Examining the inscribed stone blocks in the Temple of Friendship, Humphreys finds that they spell out "Penetrans ad interiora mortis". (Note: Latin for "Penetrating into the interior places of death".)

== Publication ==
"Mr. Humphreys and His Inheritance" was first published in More Ghost Stories of an Antiquary in 1911; it was written to "fill up" the book. In 1931, it was collected in James' book The Collected Ghost Stories of M. R. James. It has since been anthologised many times.

== Reception ==
Rosemary Pardoe and Jane Nicholls write that "Mr. Humphreys and His Inheritance" "...is an oddity amongst [James'] corpus in that it splits his enthusiasts right down the middle. Some love it, some hate it. It scored highly in the 'Favourite Story' section of G&S 20's 'MRJ Survey', and elsewhere howls of disagreement from certain quarters greeted S. T. Joshi's description of it as 'incredibly tedious'. We can, perhaps, dismiss Joshi's opinion since he is notoriously out of sympathy with [James'] intentions, but even a James buff like Samuel Russell says that the tale is 'all at loose ends', with 'a disappointingly feeble climax'." Pardoe and Nicholls note that some interpretations of the story identify James Wilson as a Cainite.

Bohun Lynch offers "the malaproprieties of the agent in 'Mr. Humphreys and His Inheritance'" as an example of James' "delightfully and unusually shrewd reproductions of conversation".

Clark Ashton Smith describes "'Mr. Humphreys and His Inheritance" as "inferential" and "full of unfathomably baleful suggestion".

Jack Sullivan writes "'The Story of a Disappearance and an Appearance,' 'Two Doctors', 'Mr. Humphreys and His Inheritance" and 'Rats' read more like dark enigmas than finished works of fiction."

Jane Mainley-Piddock writes "Gothic modernist tropes are plentiful in James's later work, for example in the inheritance of madness through a defective bloodline in 'Mr Humphreys and His Inheritance', in which the nephew of a solitary academic inherits a decaying mansion, with a maze at its centre" and "The protagonist of the tale inherits a maze from his great uncle, which figuratively binds him to the expectations of his decaying bloodline. This inversion of the sunny pastoral, infected by the strain of madness passed down by inheritance, is another mark of gothic modernism."

== Adaptations ==
"Mr. Humphreys and His Inheritance" was adapted for television as part of an episode of the programme Music Scene, an educational series produced by the ITV Schools strand in 1976. The production was written, produced, and directed by Tony Scull and starred Geoffrey Russell as Mr. Humphreys. This production is available on DVD as an extra on the Network DVD of the 1979 ITV Playhouse production of Casting the Runes.
