= Two Doctors =

- Short story by M. R. James
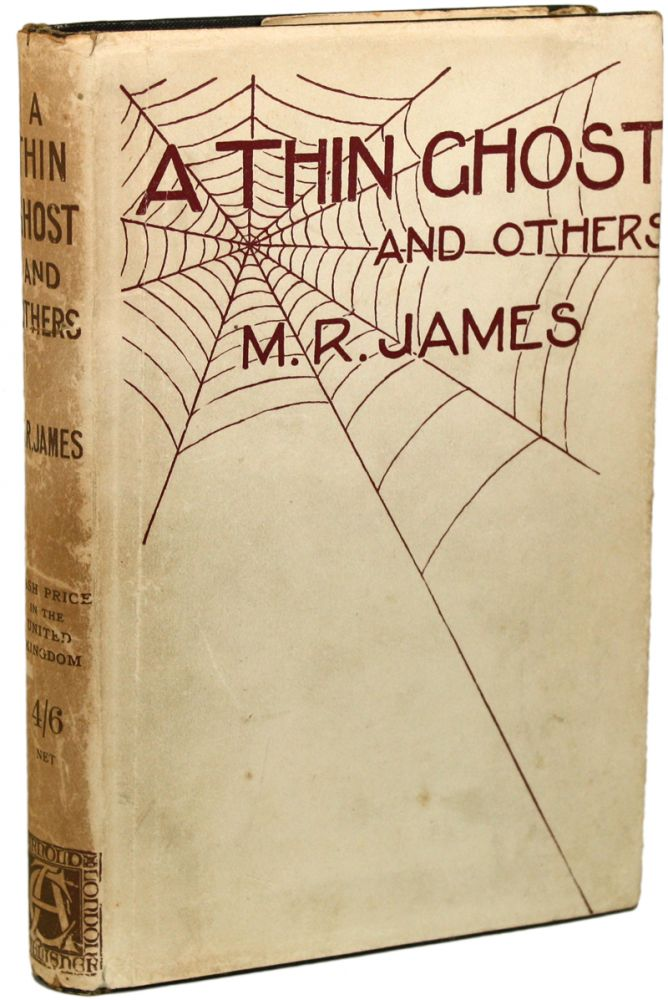
- "Two Doctors" was published in A Thin Ghost and Others in 1919

Text available at Wikisource
- Country: England
- Language: English
- Genre: Ghost story

Publication
- Published in: A Thin Ghost and Others
- Publisher: Edward Arnold
- Media type: Print
- Publication date: 1919

"Two Doctors" is a short story by the English writer M. R. James, first published in A Thin Ghost and Others in 1919.

== Plot summary ==
In the story's framing device, which takes place in 1911, the unnamed narrator purchases an old ledger, within which he finds a dossier belonging to a Gray's Inn lawyer. The narrator describes the lawyer's papers as "furnish[ing] a riddle in which the supernatural appears to play a part."

In Islington in June 1718, Dr. Abell is angered when his long-term servant Luke Jennett gives his notice, obliquely referring to an unpleasant incident concerning "the bedstaff in the dispensing-room". Jennett goes on to work for Dr. Quinn, who is also based in Islington.

Dr. Jonathan Pratt, the rector of Islington, knows both Dr. Abell and Dr. Quinn, describing Quinn as "a plain, honest believer" and Abell as "interest[ing] himself in questions to which Providence, as I hold, designs no answer to be given us in this state". Pratt recounts a conversation he had with Abell where Abell asked him about the fate of spiritual creatures who were neutral in the War in Heaven, referring to the satyr mentioned by Jerome in The Life of St. Paul the Hermit. Abell hints at having encountered such creatures while travelling country lanes at night-time. Abell is angered when Pratt jokes that he should report the satyr to the Royal Society. On another occasion, Pratt jestingly asks Abell if he has met again with his "odd friends"; Abell is alarmed by the question, saying "You were never there? I did not see you. Who brought you?" When Pratt suggests that Abell visit Quinn for a bolus, Abell angrily accuses Quinn of stealing his patients, aided by rumours spread by Jennett. When Pratt mentions his brother in the East Indies having seen juggling tricks at the court of the Rajah of Mysore, Abell remarks that it would be desirable to attain "the power of communicating motion and energy to inanimate objects". Abell stretches out his hand towards the fireplace; seemingly by coincidence, the poker falls over. Pratt warns that acquiring such power would entail "a heavier payment than any Christian would care to make; Abell remarks that "I have no doubt these bargains can be made very tempting, very persuasive."

Pratt dines with Quinn, who describes an unpleasant dream he has had repeatedly. In the dream, Quinn enters his garden on a moonlit night and digs in the shrubbery, uncovering a man-sized chrysalis. Reluctantly opening the chrysalis, he uncovers "his own face in a state of death". On each occasion, Quinn wakes from the dream struggling to breathe.

Jennett denies that he has spread gossip about Abell, who he fears, but admits to mentioning "the matter of the bedstaff" to other servants. On one occasion, while Quinn is out, a visitor matching Abell's description visits his house, entering Quinn's study, dispensing-room, and bedchamber. Immediately after the incident, Quinn begins dreaming of the chrysalis, and decides to purchase new pillows and bedsheets; he acquires a set decorated with a coronet and a bird, which he finds very comfortable. Jennett passes Abell in the street, who asks if he is looking for a new job; when Jennett replies that he is happy working for Quinn, Abell suggests he will be looking for new employment soon.

Pratt is summoned to Quinn's house one morning with the news that Quinn is dead or dying; the finds Quinn lying dead in his bed with the two ends of his pillow closed over his face, having died of suffocation. Pratt is puzzled as to why Quinn would not have pushed the pillow away from his face. The only routes into Quinn's bedroom were a sturdy locked door and a window showing no marks of entry. An autopsy carried out by a surgeon is inconclusive, with the verdict being "Death by the visitation of God".

The narrator mentions that there is one final paper in the dossier which originally he assumed to be misplaced, but on reflection understands its inclusion. The paper details a theft from a mausoleum in Middlesex, for which a dealer in north London was punished for receiving stolen goods. (Note: S. T. Joshi interprets that Abell cast a spell on Quinn's bedsheets to cause him discomfort, then somehow contrived to have Quinn purchase new bedclothes made from the burial sheets of a deceased nobleman, which then suffocated Quinn.)

== Publication ==
"Two Doctors" was first published in A Thin Ghost and Others in 1919. It has since been collected many times, including in The Collected Ghost Stories of M. R. James in 1931.

== Reception ==
"Two Doctors" forms part of what critic Michael Kellermeyer describes as James' "puzzle-story phase", consisting of oblique tales that require an unusual amount of interpretation. Similarly, S. T. Joshi describes it as "a supernatural puzzle in which the reader is challenged to piece together the solution". Rosemary Pardoe describes it as James' "weakest and most difficult story", noting "How Abell engineered matters so that Quinn would buy the bedding from [a] particular dealer is one of the unexplained mysteries and frustrations of the story." Michael Cox describes it as "one of [James'] least successful stories". Penny Fielding describes the story as "confusing" and as an example of works by James that "do not bother with any explanation at all". Bob Hodges describes "Two Doctors" as "highly elliptical" and "rely[ing] on the reader to make inferences from [its] sparse details." Jack Sullivan writes "'The Story of a Disappearance and an Appearance,' 'Two Doctors', 'Mr. Humphreys and His Inheritance" and 'Rats' read more like dark enigmas than finished works of fiction."

Both Joshi and Pardoe suggest that the main characters' names are a reference to Cain and Abel. Similarly, Jane Mainley-Piddock describes the story as "...an allegorical reworking of the Biblical tale of Cain and Abel", adding "...as Cain (Abell in James's tale) is the murderous brother, it is also possible to read him as having an unindividuated personality, and to argue that the Jungian shadow had taken over his personality, resulting in the murder of his "brother" Dr Quinn."

Nataliya Oryshchuk notes that Dr. Quinn's dream in "Two Doctors" "...demonstrates traditional Gothic framework: grave digging, moonlight, extracting of the corpse, and the horror of the discovery."

Gerald Adair speculates that Fritz Leiber's 1977 short story "The Pale Brown Thing" was inspired by "Two Doctors" and other works of James.
