= Casting the Runes (Playhouse) =

1979 British television ghost story

Casting the Runes DVD cover

Casting the Runes is a British supernatural television drama produced by Yorkshire Television for the ITV network in 1979. Running at 50 minutes, it is based on the story Casting the Runes by British writer and academic M. R. James, first published in 1911 as the fourth story in More Ghost Stories of an Antiquary, which was James' second collection of ghost stories. Directed by Lawrence Gordon Clark for the anthology series ITV Playhouse, it was first broadcast on 24 April 1979. Adapted by Clive Exton, it reimagines the events of James's story taking place in the late 1970s and changes the central protagonist to be a female character.

== Synopsis ==
The story begins in 1968 with John Harrington walking his dog in a deserted field. The dog becomes agitated by the presence of something unseen that is approaching them. Harrington is then savagely killed by a monstrous demonic creature we only glimpse.

A decade later, Prudence Dunning is the producer of an investigative journalism television programme and has just completed an episode about the occult, which included a section about N.I. Karswell, a wealthy American demonologist and cult figure who lives in a nearby rectory. In 1969, Karswell (who refers to himself as the 'Abbot of Lufford') self-published a book called "A History of Witchcraft". Karswell's philosophy is that everyone should believe in "Vice as the only true virtue, lust as the only true modesty, indecency the only true decorum and evil the only true good." After Prudence mocks Karswell's writings on-air as "mumbo-jumbo", the vengeful Karswell then begins using his knowledge of the dark arts to get even with her, and over the next few days, she is plagued by a series of bizarre supernatural occurrences. Karswell begins by placing a voodoo doll of Prudence on a bed in a dollhouse beside a model of a spider. A couple of nights later, Prudence is alone in her apartment (after her flatmate mysteriously falls ill and is hospitalised) and is horrified when a large demonic spider appears in her bed.

At the television studio, as Prudence is rewatching the episode of her show that mentions Karswell, she notices a mysterious caption appearing onscreen that refers to the deceased John Harrington who died a decade earlier, and the words "one month was allowed". Her editor checks the film and sees that the caption has somehow been printed into the finished show, but he cannot explain how or why.

Later, Prudence unknowingly encounters Karswell in the local library when he "accidentally" knocks over a pile of books she is about to borrow. He feigns an apology and picks the books up and hands them to her before leaving.

Derek Gayton, Prudence's boss at the TV studio, becomes concerned for her welfare and invites her to stay with him and his wife Jean. While there, Jean recalls knowing John Harrington, who was a reader at the publishing house she worked at, and links his mysterious death to Karswell. Prudence then meets John's brother Henry and learns how and why John was killed a decade earlier, after he was also critical of Karswell and caused his book to be rejected by the publishers. Henry also tells Prudence that a month before he died, John unwittingly received a strange piece of parchment paper from Karswell with a Runic inscription on it.

Prudence quickly deduces that Karswell isn't actually a charlatan as she originally thought, and that the dark forces plaguing her are his doing. This is confirmed when she finds a parchment with a runic inscription on in the library books she borrowed and realises Karswell secretly put it there when he knocked her books over in the library a couple of weeks earlier. She also realises Karswell has placed a curse on her, much like he did to John Harrington years earlier, that will result in her death in just over a week. She learns that the only way the curse can be lifted is to personally hand back the parchment to Karswell, thus transferring the curse to him. She goes to visit him using a disguise, however, Karswell knows who she is and outwits her. As time begins to run out, Prudence learns that Karswell is going abroad to Venezuela on the very day she is due to die. She and Derek concoct a desperate plan, arranging for her to be behind the ticket desk at the airport, again in a disguise. As Karswell arrives only moments before his flight is due to depart, Derek creates a brief distraction at the ticket desk, long enough for Prudence to take over from the existing ticket agent and hand Karswell his flight ticket along with the parchment folded inside it. Once Karswell realises who she is, he tries to hand the ticket back to her, but she refuses it. Karswell has no option but to board his plane.

Later, Prudence is watching the news when it is announced that the plane crashed not long after take-off, following some kind of disturbance in the passenger cabin. She realises Karswell's curse has indeed come to pass but with himself as its victim.

== Cast ==
- Jan Francis as Prudence Dunning
- Bernard Gallagher as Derek Gayton
- Joanna Dunham as Jean Gayton
- Edward Petherbridge as Henry Harrington
- Iain Cuthbertson as N.I. Karswell
- Christopher Good as John Harrington
- Patricia Shakesby as Elise Marriott
- David Calder as John Marriott
- Jane Lowe as Joanna
- Alan Downer as Peter
- Clifford Parrish as Wiggin
- Christine Buckley as housekeeper
- Abdul Ali as Doctor
- Simon Prebble as newscaster

== Reception ==
A review of the production in Horrified Magazine said:

"Exton and Clark work together to create a setting where the characters live in a definably real world that is being intruded by something ancient and unrelenting. There are some great performances, with Francis an anchor to everything as the unravelling Dunning. Cuthbertson has a grand time as the wicked Karswell, here a genuinely malevolent presence, a character who seems to revel in the power he wields. Filtering through a decade of that beguiling, bleak approach the play also has a suitably harsh conclusion as it fades out, the wreckage caused by Karswell extending far beyond the final shot of a devastated Dunning."

Robert Markworth, reviewing the piece for Spooky Isles in 2022, wrote:

"Casting the Runes may lack some of the polish of Clark's BBC films but, despite the slim budget afforded to this presentation, still carries enough of the director's familiar stamp of quality, and cleverly spooky flourishes, to ensure it fits comfortably within his supernatural oeuvre."

== Location ==
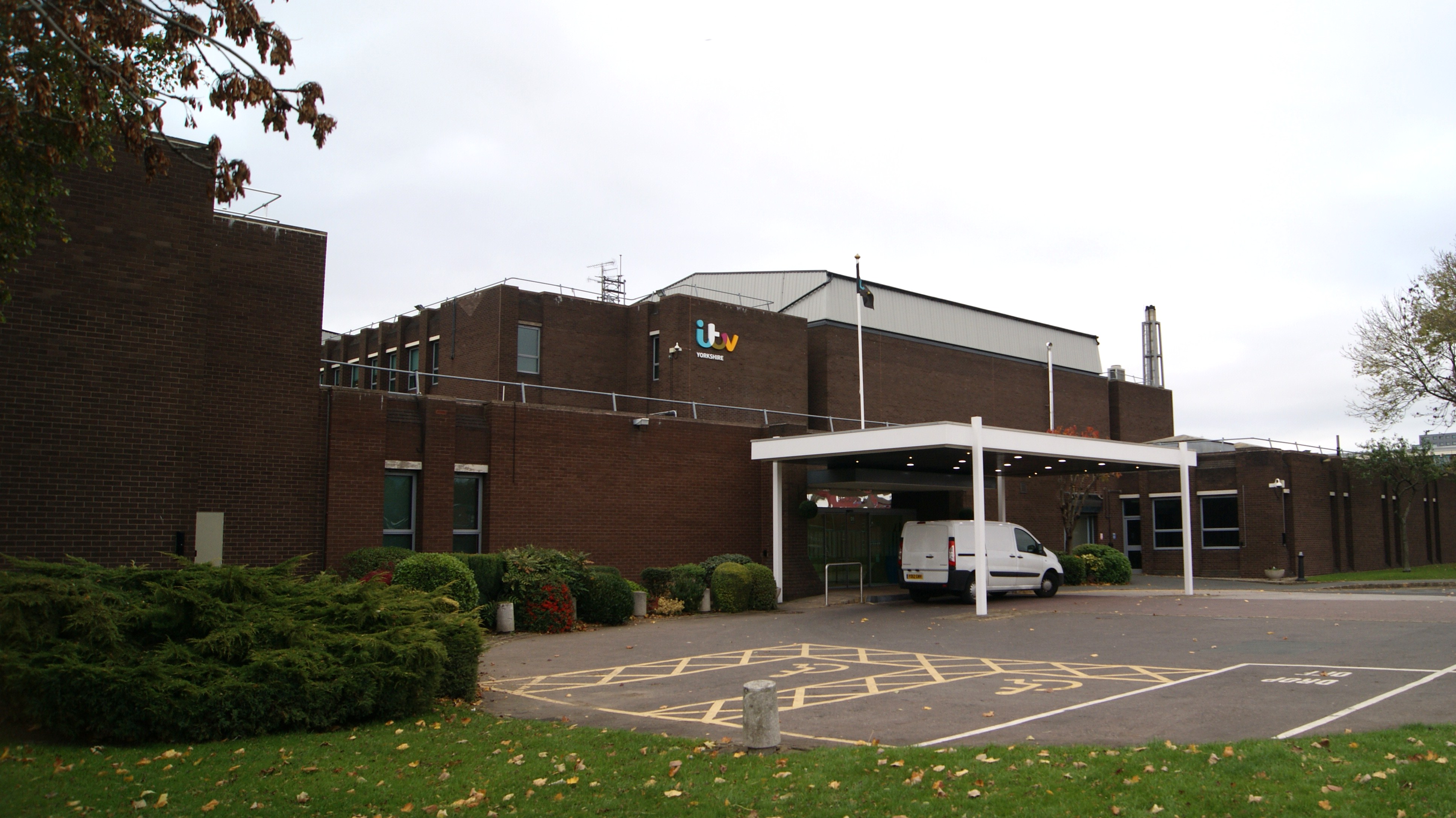
The Leeds Studios were used for exterior shots. Seen here in 2013

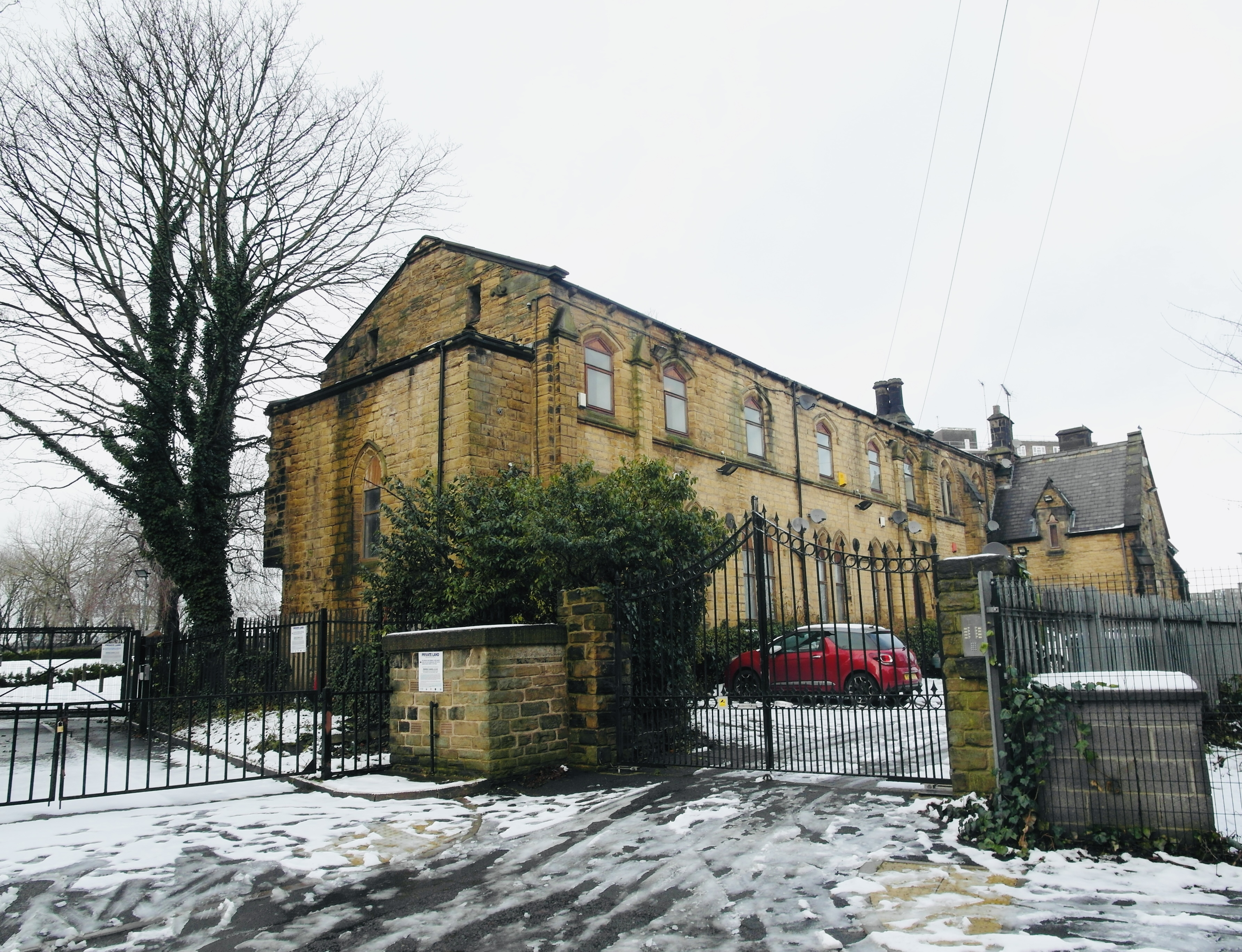
The former rectory/church hall on St Mary’s Street in Leeds was used as the home of Karswell

The drama was shot exclusively in a snowy Leeds and the surrounding area during the winter of 1978. The exterior shots of Dunning arriving at the television studios were filmed at The Leeds Studios of ITV Yorkshire on Kirstall Road in Leeds. The former rectory/church hall (now private flats) on St. Mary's Street served as the former rectory in which Karswell was living. St Mary’s church in Mabgate, which is seen in the drama, was demolished around 1980 after falling into disrepair. Other scenes were filmed in St. Mary’s Park while the shot of Karswell standing at the peak of a steep footbridge was filmed on St. Mary’s Street on the bridge crossing the New York Road. Karswell passes the curse to Dunning in the Brotherton Library at the University of Leeds.

== DVD release ==
Casting the Runes was released on DVD in the UK by Network DVD in 2007. In addition to the programme itself, the DVD also includes a 1976 episode of the educational series Music Scene which features a 15-minute screen adaptation of the M.R. James ghost story Mr. Humphreys and His Inheritance, as well as the 50 minute documentary A Pleasant Terror: The Life and Ghosts of M.R. James from 1995.
