= Night of the Demon =

1957 British horror film directed by Jacques Tourneur

- UK quad crown theatrical release poster
- Directed by: Jacques Tourneur
- Screenplay by: Charles Bennett; Hal E. Chester; Uncredited: Cy Endfield
- Based on: "Casting the Runes" (1911 story) by M. R. James
- Produced by: Frank Bevis; Hal E. Chester
- Starring: Dana Andrews; Peggy Cummins; Niall MacGinnis
- Cinematography: Ted Scaife
- Edited by: Michael Gordon
- Music by: Clifton Parker
- Production company: Sabre Film Production
- Distributed by: Columbia Pictures
- Release date: November 1957 (UK)
- Running time: 96 minutes (original); 82 minutes (US cut)
- Country: United Kingdom
- Language: English

Night of the Demon (released in the United States as Curse of the Demon) is a 1957 British horror film directed by Jacques Tourneur and starring Dana Andrews, Niall MacGinnis and Peggy Cummins. It was produced by Hal E. Chester and Frank Bevis, and was adapted from the M. R. James' short story "Casting the Runes", first featured in his 1911 collection More Ghost Stories of an Antiquary. The film's storyline concerns an American psychologist (Andrews) who travels to England to investigate a satanic cult suspected in more than one death.

Turbulent artistic differences arose between Chester on one side and Tourneur and the screenwriter Charles Bennett on the other over Chester's plan to show the demon on screen, but Chester prevailed. To accelerate the pace and make the film more commercial, the 96-minute original feature was trimmed down to 82 minutes prior to its release in the United States. This shortened version was retitled Curse of the Demon, playing in June 1958 as the second half of a double feature with either The True Story of Lynn Stuart (1958) or The Revenge of Frankenstein (1958), depending on the local film market.

Though not a significant commercial success on its initial release in 1957, Night of the Demon has been highly acclaimed by critics and filmmakers in retrospect, and is considered one of the greatest horror films of all time. At the film review aggregator website Rotten Tomatoes, the film holds an approval rating of 100% based on 17 reviews.

== Plot ==
In England, Professor Harrington begs his rival, Dr Karswell, to rescind a curse he inflicted on him; in return, Harrington will cease his investigation into Karswell's Satanic cult. After learning that a parchment he gave Harrington has been destroyed, Karswell merely promises to do what he can. As Harrington arrives home, he sees a cloud of smoke appear out of nowhere and a demon materialise from it. Harrington tries to escape in his car but crashes into power lines. The authorities declare accidental electrocution as the cause of death.

Dr Holden arrives in Britain to attend a convention at which Harrington had intended to expose the cult. He is informed that the only link between Harrington's death and the cult is a man suspected of murder, Rand Hobart, who has fallen into a catatonic stupor. While Harrington's collaborators consider the possibility of supernatural forces, Holden rejects such an option.

Holden meets Karswell apparently by chance at the British Museum Reading Room, when a rare book that Holden requests goes missing, Karswell offers to show Holden his personal copy at his mansion. At Harrington's funeral, Holden meets his niece, Joanna. She gives him Harrington's diary, which details the Professor's fear of Karswell's power. Holden remains sceptical, but goes with Joanna to Karswell's mansion, where Karswell is holding a Halloween party for local children. When a strong windstorm abruptly starts, Karswell claims to have created it with a spell. When Holden mocks him, Karswell claims that Holden will die in three days.

Holden and his colleagues discuss Karswell, making plans to examine Rand Hobart. Holden goes to dinner with Joanna and she shows him her uncle's diary. Harrington's diary mentions a parchment with runic writing on it that was passed to him by Karswell, and Holden finds a similar parchment that Karswell secretly passed to him at the library. A powerful wind comes through the window, blowing the parchment from his fingers towards the fireplace, only to be stopped by a fire screen. Holden recovers and pockets it.

Holden visits Hobart's family seeking permission to hypnotise Hobart to find out more about Harrington's death. The mother gives her consent but says that the family are "believers". As Holden leaves, the parchment is blown from his hand. Hobart's family becomes fearful and declares Holden to be "chosen". Later, Holden compares the parchment's runes to ones inscribed on nearby Stonehenge.

Joanna takes Holden to a séance at the invitation of Karswell's mother. A medium claims to channel Harrington, who tells them that Karswell has the key to reading the runes in his copy of the rare book. After Holden abruptly exits, dismissing the séance as nonsense, Joanna says she intends to search for the key and they drive to Karswell's mansion. Holden breaks into the house and is attacked by Karswell's cat which seems to morph into a panther. Holden is rescued by Karswell entering and switching on the light, saying he knew Holden would come. Against Karswell's warning, Holden leaves through the woods, chased by a cloud of smoke and fire before escaping.

Under hypnosis, the suspect Hobart reveals to Holden that he was "chosen" to die by having a runic parchment passed to him, but avoided death by passing it back to the person who had given it to him. When Holden shows Hobart the parchment he had received from Karswell, Hobart thinks he is trying to give it to him. He becomes hysterical and jumps through a window to his death.

Holden learns Karswell is taking a train to Southampton, and on the train discovers that he has kidnapped and hypnotised Joanna. As the time for Holden's predicted death draws near, the train stops at the next station, and Karswell tries to leave. Holden manages to sneak the parchment into Karswell's coat pocket, and when Karswell finds it, it flies from his hand. He chases it down the tracks, but as he reaches it the parchment combusts. As an oncoming train approaches, the demon manifests and savagely kills Karswell. When his corpse is found by the tracks, the police believe that he was struck and dragged by the train. Holden, instead of going to inspect the body, departs with Joanna.

== Cast ==
- Dana Andrews as John Holden
- Peggy Cummins as Joanna Harrington
- Niall MacGinnis as Doctor Karswell
- Maurice Denham as Professor Harrington
- Athene Seyler as Mrs Karswell
- Liam Redmond as Mark O'Brien
- Reginald Beckwith as Mr Meek
- Ewan Roberts as Lloyd Williamson
- Peter Elliott as Kumar
- Rosamund Greenwood as Mrs Meek
- Brian Wilde as Rand Hobart
- Richard Leech as Inspector Mottram
- Lloyd Lamble as Detective Simmons
- Peter Hobbes as Superintendent
- Charles Lloyd-Pack as Chemist
- John Salew as Librarian
- Janet Barrow as Mrs Hobart
- Percy Herbert as Farmer
- Lynn Tracy as Air Hostess

== Production ==
Screenwriter Charles Bennett owned the rights to the original story "Casting the Runes" and wrote a screenplay loosely based on it, using the title The Haunted. He sold his script to independent producer and former child actor Hal E. Chester shortly before going to America. Bennett later regretted selling the script, because on arrival in America he was approached by RKO, who wanted to purchase it and allow Bennett to direct the film. Actors Robert Taylor and Dick Powell had been in line for the leading roles if this production had taken place.

Despite having acquired the project from Bennett, Chester decided the Bennett screenplay was too tame, or as Tony Earnshaw described it, "too British". He hired blacklisted writer Cy Endfield to create the final screenplay. Despite his contribution, which Earnshaw said was "significant", Endfield was ultimately uncredited.

Jacques Tourneur was brought in as director by Chester on the recommendation of Ted Richmond, the producer of Tourneur's previous film, Nightfall (1957). However, Tourneur and Chester had serious disagreements during filming. One argument was about the wind scene; Tourneur tried to convince Chester to replace two electric fans with two aeroplane engines. When Chester hesitated, star Dana Andrews threatened to leave the picture if Chester did not let "the director direct the picture". Locations for the film include Brocket Hall, Hertfordshire (as Lufford Hall), Stonehenge, Bricket Wood railway station and the Reading Room of the British Museum.

Producer Chester and his British co-producer, Frank Bevis, had decided to show the demon at the beginning and end of the film. Tourneur later said that he was against the addition: "The scenes where you see the demon were shot without me...the audience should never have been completely certain of having seen the demon." Stop motion master Ray Harryhausen was requested by Columbia Pictures to create the demon for the production, but he was already committed to his Dynamation film The 7th Voyage of Sinbad with producer Charles H. Schneer. Author Tony Earnshaw's book Beating the Devil: The Making of Night of the Demon argues that showing the demon was planned early on in the production (despite Tourneur's protests to the contrary), in order to heighten the tension in the film by letting the audience know the demonic powers were real. Bennett, also angry at the script changes, said "If [Chester] walked up my driveway right now, I'd shoot him dead."

== Release ==
=== Theatrical ===
Night of the Demon was released in November 1957 in the United Kingdom. It was shown on a double feature with the American film 20 Million Miles to Earth.

In the United States, it was released (in shortened form) as Curse of the Demon. According to Charles Bennett, the title was changed because the studio did not want it confused with the similarly titled The Night of the Iguana. It had the same reduced length of 82 minutes for its June 1958 American release. The scenes removed included a visit to the Hobart family farm, a trip to Stonehenge, and snippets of the séance scenes and conversations between Karswell and his mother. The visit to the British Library scene was rearranged in the film's viewing continuity. In the United States Curse of the Demon toured drive-ins and theatres as a double feature with either The True Story of Lynn Stuart or The Revenge of Frankenstein.

=== Home media ===
In the United States, the film was released on VHS in 1986 by Columbia TriStar Home Video with a run time of 83 minutes. A second VHS with the Continental 96-minute running time was released by Goodtimes Home Video Corp in 1988. In the same year, the film was released on LaserDisc by Image Entertainment/Columbia Pictures with an 81-minute running time. Including both the Continental version (Night of the Demon) and the 83-minute US version (Curse of the Demon), the film was released on DVD in August 2002.

In the United Kingdom, Night of the Demon was released on VHS in 1995 by Encore Entertainment/Columbia TriStar Home Video. The film was released on DVD in the United Kingdom for the first time on 18 October 2010. This release also includes both the Continental and US versions of the film. A Blu-ray edition from Powerhouse Films' Indicator label, featuring four different cuts of the film, was released as a UK all-region release on 22 October 2018.

== Critical reception ==
In a contemporary review, The Monthly Film Bulletin wrote: "This essay in the occult is handled with much of the assurance the same director brought to Cat People (1942), and is well above average. Inevitably the sequences where the demon takes on a visible form are the weakest – especially in the ending – and seem rather the product of a child's nightmare than an adult's imagination. But the summoning of the storm, the experiences of Holden in Karswell's library and the woods and the rousing of one of Karswell's victims (brilliantly played by Brian Wilde) from a hypnotic trance are effective."

In the early 2010s, Time Out conducted a poll among numerous authors, directors, actors, and critics who have worked within the horror genre to vote for their top horror films. They placed Night of the Demon at number 52 on their top 100 list. Director Martin Scorsese placed Night of the Demon on his list of the 11 scariest horror films of all time.

Night of the Demon is regarded as one of the precursors of British folk horror films. According to Little White Lies, this film is "arguably the second film summoned into existence of the folk horror genre, following on 35 years from Benjamin Christensen's Häxan: Witchcraft Through the Ages".

At the film review aggregator website Rotten Tomatoes, the film holds an approval rating of 100%, based on 17 reviews.

== In other media ==
Kate Bush used a sound clip from the film featuring the line, "it's in the trees, it's coming!", in her 1985 song "Hounds of Love".

Dark Ambient artist Lustmord used a sample of the line "It was the night of the demon" from the hypnosis scene late in the movie for his track "Ixaxaar" from the 2011 album The Monstrous Soul.

In the stage musical The Rocky Horror Show and its film adaptation, the opening song, "Science Fiction/Double Feature", references many classic sci-fi/horror films. Among these references is the line "Dana Andrews said prunes gave him the runes/And passing them used lots of skills."

== See also ==
- List of British films of 1957
