= The Diary of Mr. Poynter =

- Short story by M. R. James
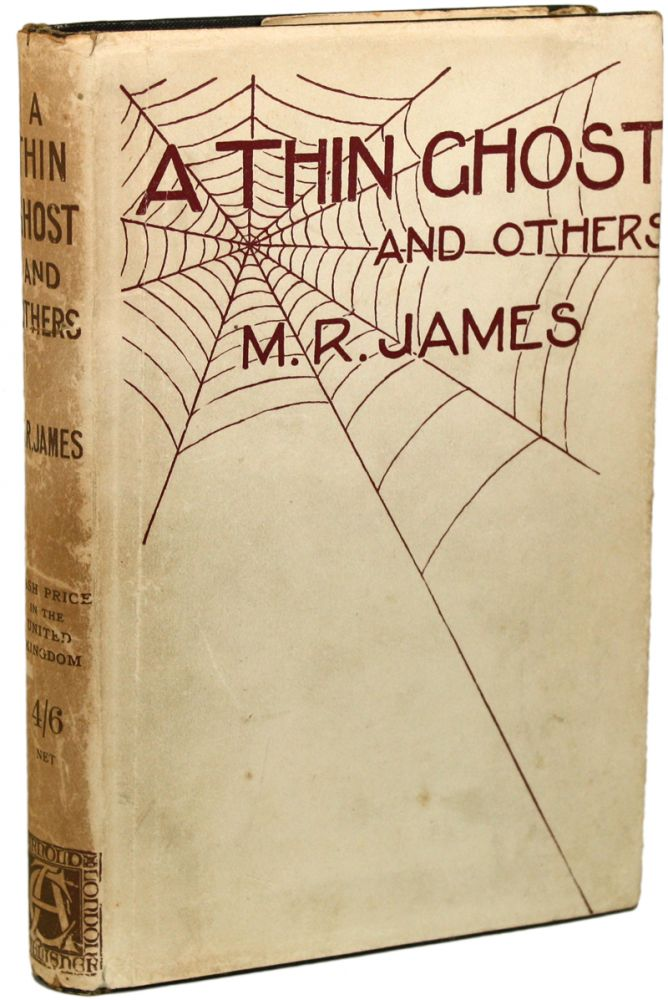
- "The Diary of Mr. Poynter" was published in A Thin Ghost and Others in 1919

Text available at Wikisource
- Country: England
- Language: English
- Genre: Ghost story

Publication
- Published in: A Thin Ghost and Others
- Publisher: Edward Arnold
- Media type: Print
- Publication date: 1919

"The Diary of Mr. Poynter" is a ghost story by the English writer M. R. James, first published in A Thin Ghost and Others in 1919. It concerns a diary from the early eighteenth century which contains a strange, seemingly cursed, pattern. The story has been adapted into other media, including a 1963 radio play by the BBC Home Service, a 1980 episode of the television series Spine Chillers, and a 2017 comic book.

== Plot summary ==
The story opens in the spring with Mr. James Denton, a Fellow of the Society of Antiquaries of London, visiting a book sale in London, where he has been purchasing furnishings for his newly-built home, Rendcomb Manor in Warwick. While looking for works about Warwickshire, Denton meets a friend, who notes a Warwickshire diary is up for auction. Denton successfully bids for the diary, which dates from 1710 and is authored by Mr. William Poynter, then then-Squire of Acrington. Picking up a volume of the diary to examine it, Denton's aunt finds a piece of fabric with an unusual pattern pinned to a page. Miss Denton is fascinated by the pattern, which is reminiscent of hair. Denton undertakes to arrange to have the pattern copied to make chintz curtains for the manor.

The work is carried out by a firm in Bermondsey; Mr. Cattell, an employee of the firm, remarks that the man who cut the block took a dislike to the pattern, "as if the man scented something almost Hevil [sic] in the design." The new curtains are finally completed in October. Denton is initially pleased with the curtains, which are installed in his bedroom. The following morning, he complains about the pattern having been joined up at the top of the curtain, saying "there was an effect as if some one kept peeping out between the curtains in one place or another, where there was no edge". Denton notes that the curtains swayed and rustled throughout the night, though his aunt remarks that she thought the night was still. That night, while dozing in his bedroom armchair, Denton feels hair beneath his hand, which initially he assumes to be his pet spaniel. Looking over the arm of the chair, Denton sees a menacing human-shaped figure rising; the figure has no discernible face, only hair. As Denton flees his bedroom, he feels "a soft ineffectual tearing at his back which, all the same, seemed to be growing in power".

The next day, Denton leaves Rendcomb Manor, taking Mr. Poytner's diary with him. Examining the section where the fabric was pinned, he finds that several pages have been pasted together. Steaming them apart, Denton reads about Sir Everard Charlett, who was known to be an atheist and heavy drinker. His wild behaviour and long hair led him to be dubbed "Absalom". In 1692–1693, Sir Everard was found dead in the town ditch with the hair plucked from his head. Two years later, Sir Everard's coffin was accidentally broken open while being relocated; it was inexplicably found to be full of hair. Mr. Poytner came into possession of the piece of fabric, which Sir Everard "had design'd expressly for a memorial of his Hair", and pins it in his diary as a memento.

The story concludes with Denton burning the curtains. Hearing about the incident, Mr. Cattell remarks "There are more things...". (Note: "There are more things in heaven and earth, Horatio, Than are dreamt of in your philosophy." A quote from act 1, scene 5 of the play Hamlet.)

== Publication ==
"The Diary of Mr. Poynter" was first published in James' book A Thin Ghost and Others in 1919. It has since been collected many times, including in The Collected Ghost Stories of M. R. James in 1931.

== Reception ==
"The Diary of Mr. Poynter" forms part of what critic Michael Kellermeyer describes as James' "puzzle-story phase," consisting of oblique tales that require an unusual amount of interpretation. Julia Briggs cites "The Diary of Mr. Poynter" as an example of James depicting a "comic Gothicisation of domestic drudgery". Similarly, S. T. Joshi notes "[James'] ability to invest the commonest objects of household use—in this case, a set of curtains—with supernatural menace". Penelope Fitzgerald cites the story as an example of James' protagonists who must face "the malice of inanimate objects", in this case curtains.

Peter Penzoldt notes that "The Diary of Mr. Poynter" "...ends with a double climax which is quite common in James' stories".

Patrick J. Murphy and Fred Porcheddu observe similarities between "The Diary of Mr. Poynter" and "Canon Alberic's Scrap-Book", and suggest that the titular diary was inspired by Remarks and Collections, the journals of the antiquary Thomas Hearne. David Langford describes the story as "an echo of 'Oh, Whistle...' which seems almost self-parodic".

Jane Mainley-Piddock notes that the story "features a Darwinian throwback, a monster made up entirely of hair [representing] the idea of a monstrous ghost who has regressed to a pre-homo sapiens state."

== Adaptations ==
In 1963, Charles Lefeaux (who had acted in the 1949 radio adaptation of "'Oh, Whistle, and I'll Come to You, My Lad'") produced three M. R. James radio adaptations of his own. The first of these was "The Diary of Mr. Poynter", an entry in the Mystery Playhouse strand for the BBC Home Service ("My hair! Give me back my hair! Give me back my beautiful brown hair" teased the Radio Times). The 15-minute play, which aired on 7 June 1963, starred Marius Goring as Denton.

A reading of "The Diary of Mr. Poynter" by Michael Bryant was the subject of the 12 December 1980 episode of the BBC One children's supernatural television series Spine Chillers.

In 2017, the cartoonist Seth released an illustrated adaptation of "The Diary of Mr. Poynter" as part of his "Seth's Christmas Ghost Stories" series.
