= The Residence at Whitminster =

- Short story by M. R. James
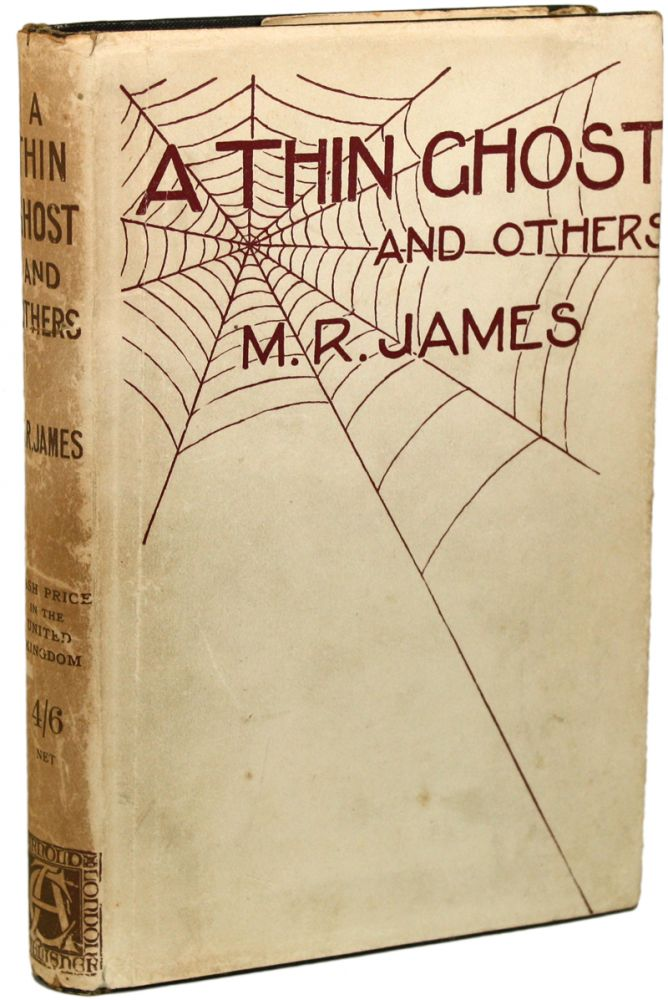
- "The Residence at Whitminster" was published in A Thin Ghost and Others in 1919

Text available at Wikisource
- Country: United Kingdom
- Language: English
- Genre: Ghost story

Publication
- Published in: A Thin Ghost and Others
- Publication type: Print, book
- Publisher: Edward Arnold
- Publication date: 1919

"The Residence at Whitminster" is a horror short story by British writer M. R. James, first published in his book A Thin Ghost and Others in 1919.

== Plot summary ==
=== 1730–1731 ===
The first part of the story takes place in 1730. Dr. Ashton - the prebendary of a collegiate church in Whitminster - and his wife Mrs. Ashton are the adoptive parents of Frank Sydall, Mrs. Ashton's preteen nephew. The Ashtons have also taken in the Viscount Saul, the teenaged son of the Earl of Kildonan (who has gone to Lisbon to take up a post in the British Embassy there) in return for 200 guineas a year and a potential Irish bishopric for Dr. Ashton. The Earl of Kildonan warns in a letter that Saul "is given to moping about in our raths and graveyards: and he brings home romances that fright my servants out of their wits" and encourages Dr. Ashton to be stern with Saul. Upon Saul's arrival, he pats the neck of the horse drawing his chaise, causing it to start and almost causing an accident. Saul is described as popular with the Ashton's servants, yet several leave and Mrs. Ashton finds it challenging to recruit others.

One Friday morning, Mrs. Ashton's prized black cockerel disappears; Saul finds burned feathers on the garden's rubbish heap. Later that day, Dr. Ashton observes the two boys in the garden: Frank is examining a glittering object in his hand while Saul listens; after Saul places his hand on Frank's head, Frank drops the object on the ground and covers his eyes. Saul is visibly angered, and quickly picks up the object. When Dr. Ashton asks Saul about the incident, Saul claims they were recreating a scene from Rhadamistus. Subsequently, Frank appears ill; he attempts to speak to the Ashtons, but both are too busy. After Frank runs into the prebendary house and implores Mrs. Aston to "keep them off", he is put to bed; a visiting doctor diagnoses him as seriously ill, and in need of quiet. Dr. Ashton is visited by his wife, Mrs. Ashton, who tells him that his nephew Frank is "in a very sad way", and seeks his approval to prevent the church's clock from chiming so that Frank can sleep. Dr. Ashton agrees to halt the bell and asks Mrs. Ashton to send Saul to him. Saul claims that he knows little of Frank's illness, but suggests that he may have frightened Frank by telling him stories about "second sight". Frank dies shortly after; before dying, he asks Dr. Ashton to tell Saul "I am afraid he will be very cold" and apologies to Mrs. Ashton for the loss of her cockerel, saying "he said we must use it so, if we were to see all that could be seen". Dr. Ashton grows suspicious of Saul.

In late-January 1731, Dr. Ashton writes to Lord Kildonan to tell him that Saul is dead. During Frank's funeral, Saul was seen to have repeatedly looked over his shoulder "with a terrible expression of listening fear". After the funeral, Saul disappeared, with a storm taking place that night. The following morning, the sexton finds Saul's body clinging to the door of the church, with his legs "torn and bloody". Frank and Saul are buried together in Whitminster churchyard.

=== 1820s ===
The second half of the story takes place in the mid-1820s, when Dr. Henry Oldys and his niece Miss Mary Oldys take up residence in the prebendal house. Several months after their arrival, Dr. Oldys shows Miss Oldys a round, smooth, thick clear glass "tablet" which one of the servants found in the garden's rubbish heap; Mary takes a dislike to the object. Miss Oldys informs Dr. Oldys that a particular room in the house is suffering from a persistent infestation of sawflies.

In a letter to her friend Emily, Miss Oldys states that, upon looking in the tablet, she saw "objects and scenes which were not in the room where I was". Looking in the tablet, Miss Oldys sees a boy dressed in clothes from a century prior purchase "something which glittered" from an elderly woman. Next, Miss Oldys sees two boys standing over something burning on the ground of what she recognises as the prebendal house's garden; the elder boy, whose hands are bloodied, raises his hands in "an attitude of prayer" then beckons towards the garden wall, after which "moving objects" are seen over the wall and the boys flee. Next, Miss Oldys sees a figure fleeing from dog-like creatures, which eventually overtake him. Continuing her letter, Miss Oldys states that, while preparing for bed the night after she experienced the visions, she had heard a bellow from Dr. Oldys. To reach his bedroom, she must pass through two unoccupied bedrooms, in one of which she finds him in the dark. Dr. Oldys refuses to discuss what shocked him, and sleeps in a room next to Miss Oldys. That night, Miss Oldys dreams of opening her chest of drawers and seeing a hand emerge.

The next day, Dr. Oldys visits Mr. Spearman, a suitor of Miss Oldys, and tells him of the events of the prior night. While passing through the sawfly-infested room in the dark, he was accosted by an enormous sawfly "as tall as I am"; by the time Miss Oldys had arrived, the sawfly was nowhere to be seen. Under questioning for Mr. Spearman, Dr. Oldys notes that there is an old press in the room, which is locked and has never been opened. The housekeeper, Mrs. Maple, gives Spearman and Dr. Oldys a box containing the key to the press and to a chest of drawers that is also in the room. The box contains a letter from Dr. Ashton in which he advises against opening the press or chest of drawers. Mrs. Maple, who has learned the history of the events of the 1730s from the church sexton, Mr. Simpkins, tells the story of how Saul "stopped out at night: and them that was with him, why they were such as would strip the skin from the child in its grave [...] But they turned on him at the last [..] and there’s the mark still to be seen on the minster door where they run him down." Mr. Simpkins' grandfather had witnesses Saul at night-time "going about from one grave to another in the yard with a candle, and them that was with him following through the grass at his heels", and in the morning had found tracks and a bone from a human corpse on the grass. After Saul's death, Mr. Simpkins' grandfather, followed by his father and Mr. Simpkins himself, had witnessed his ghost outside their window "with his face right on the panes, and his hands fluttering out, and his mouth open and shut, open and shut, for a minute or more, and then gone off in the dark yard"; while pitying Saul, they had been too fearful to open the window. Hearing the story, Dr. Oldys decides not to open the press or chest of drawers, and has them moved to the house's garret; Miss Oldys placed the glass tablet with them. The story closes with Mr. Spearman observing that "Whitminster has a Bluebeard's chamber, and, I am rather inclined to suspect, a Jack-in-the-box, awaiting some future occupant of the residence of the senior prebendary."

== Publication ==
"The Residence at Whitminster" was first published in James' book A Thin Ghost and Others in 1919; the title takes its name from a line in the story used to describe Saul: "a withered heart makes an ugly thin ghost". In 1931, it was collected in James' book The Collected Ghost Stories of M. R. James. It has since been collected in several anthologies.

== Reception ==
B. W. Young describes "The Residence at Whitminster" as "a complex narrative" that resonates with The Sense of the Past by Henry James. Young states that the story "...examines the interrelations of two moments, divided by almost a hundred years, within the long eighteenth century, and it articulates in doing so a strong sense of the ineluctable and persistently troubling presence of the past in the presence that is the essence of 'haunting' in much nineteenth-century fiction". Young further states that the story "[gives] James an opportunity for imagining native literary engagement with earlier historic sensibilities, providing him with a forum in which the imagination can be brought to articulate historical questions relating to such contentious issues as notions of historical progress and secularisation".

Richard William Pfaff describes the story as "one of the longest, most complex, and best" of the stories in A Thin Ghost and Others. S. Hay offers the story as an example of how "James's stories provide narratively satisfying resolutions" while they "do not at the level of plot provide any more resolution do Scott's or Le Fanu's". The Cambridge Review describes the story as having "a sweetness long drawn out".

"The Residence at Whitminster" forms part of what critic Michael Kellermeyer describes as James' "puzzle-story phase," consisting of oblique tales that require an unusual amount of interpretation. S. T. Joshi states "the many layers of narration ill conceal the tale's pointlessness and prolixity." Chris Power offers the story as an example of how "...in some of James's later works this framing actually seems to take precedence over the stories' supernatural elements."

Jane Mainley-Piddock cites Mary Oldys as an example of "surprisingly significant and impressive female characters" in James' work.
