= The Story of a Disappearance and an Appearance =

- Short story by M. R. James
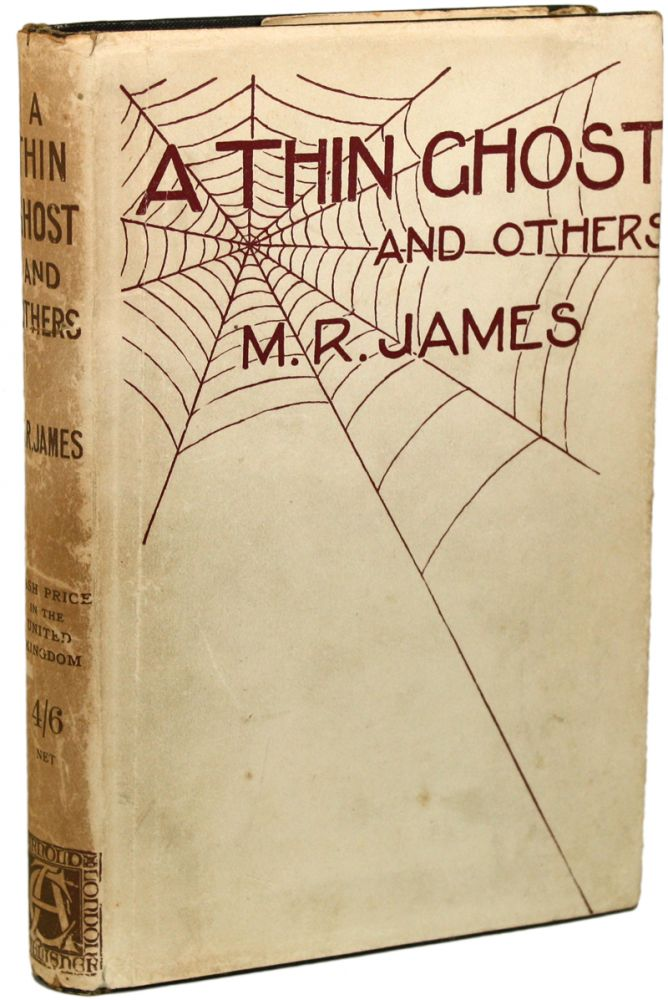
- "The Story of a Disappearance and an Appearance" was collected in A Thin Ghost and Others in 1919

Text available at Wikisource
- Country: England
- Language: English
- Genre: Ghost story

Publication
- Published in: The Cambridge Review
- Media type: Print, magazine
- Publication date: 4 June 1913

"The Story of a Disappearance and an Appearance" is a ghost story by the English writer M. R. James, first published in The Cambridge Review on 4 June 1913, and later collected in his books A Thin Ghost and Others (1919) and The Collected Ghost Stories of M. R. James (1931). An epistolary story, it concerns the disappearance of a man and mysterious events surrounding a puppet show. In 2016, it was adapted into an animated film.

== Plot summary ==
"The Story of a Disappearance and an Appearance" is an epistolary story presented as a series of letters from a writer identified only as "W. R." to his brother in December 1837.

In the first letter, sent from Great Chrishall on 22 December, W. R. informs his brother Robert that he cannot join him for Christmas due to having received a letter from his uncle Henry's housekeeper Mrs. Hunt asking him to come to "B——" (Note: In the original manuscript, the location is given as Bicester.) to help search for Henry, who has "suddenly and mysteriously disappeared". W. R. intends to travel there and lodge at the King's Head inn.

In the second letter, sent on 23 December, W. R. recounts the facts in Henry's disappearance and the unsuccessful search that has been made to date. Henry, a hardworking yet stern rector who was known to wear traditional bands, was last seen on the evening of 19 December when he visited a sick person around two miles from his home. Ponds, streams, and fields in the neighbourhood have been searched and the Bow Street Runners have been alerted. W. R. speaks to the sick person and to Mr. Bowman (the characterful landlord of the King's Head, who alludes to an argument he had had with Henry concerning a cask of beer) but is confident that neither were not involved in Henry's disappearance.

In the third letter, sent on 25 December, W. R. recounts that Mr. Bowman had apologised for his remarks, and joined W. R. on an unfruitful search of the fields. Later, W. R. speaks with a bagman, who recommends a Punch and Judy show he had seen. W. R. has a dream in which he is watching a Punch and Judy show in which a "Satanic"-looking Punch gruesomely and realistically murders the other puppets, with the stage darkening after each death. After the final murder, the backdrop of the puppet show changes to a moonlit grove of trees and sloping hill. A "sturdy figure clad in black [...] wearing bands" with his head covered with "a whitish bag" emerges and pursues Punch. As the figure catches up with Punch and throws itself upon him, removing the bag, W. R. awakens. W. R. remembers that the show did not feature a Toby dog, and that the name on the booth was "Kidman and Gallop".

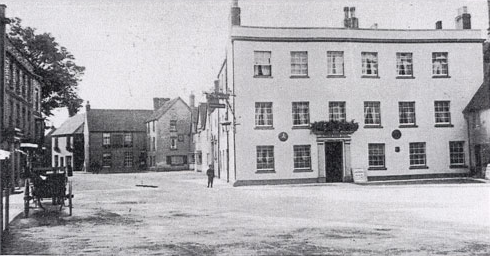
A photograph of the King's Head inn in Bicester, taken 1885

In the fourth letter, sent on 26 December, W. R. informs his brother that Henry's body has been found, but the events of his death remain mysterious. On the prior day, while W. R. is attending a Christmas Day service at church, the tenor bell repeatedly sounds, and a bier and pall are inexplicably found to have brought out of storage. That afternoon, a Punch and Judy show by Foresta and Calpigi is staged in the marketplace; W. R. watches from the first floor window of the inn. During the performance, the Toby dog repeatedly howls at the wrong times, then eventually flees. At the climax of the show, when a gallows has been erected on the stage, the elevated position of W. R. enables him to see a figure with a "nightcapped head" in the booth, which pinions the arms of one of the puppeteer and lifts him towards the gallows. The booth falls over, and two figures are seen running from the wreckage towards the fields. W. R. and others follow; they find one of the puppeteers dead in a chalk pit, having fallen over the edge and broken his neck. The other puppeteer is found dead in the booth. Henry's body is found buried in the chalk pit with a cut throat and a sack over the head. W. R. closes by telling Robert that the real names of the puppeteers were Kidman and Gallop, saying "I feel sure I have heard them, but no one here seems to know anything about them".

== Publication ==
"The Story of a Disappearance and an Appearance" was first published in The Cambridge Review on 4 June 1913. In 1919, it was collected in James' book A Thin Ghost and Others. It has since been collected many times, including in The Collected Ghost Stories of M. R. James in 1931. The original manuscript is held in the Cambridge University Library.

== Reception ==
Tim Martin describes "The Story of a Disappearance and an Appearance" as "one of [James'] most frightening pieces", while Penelope Fitzgerald describes it as "the best story [James] ever wrote". Peter Bell states "For James, who normally purveys terror with a lighter touch, this is exceptionally graphic" and suggests it is inspired by "...an obviously disquieting childhood memory" of James'. Chris Power writes, "Even in restraint [James] can terrorise".

Michael Kellermeyer suggests that "The Story of a Disappearance and an Appearance" reflects "James' growing pessimism with human progress and institutions", noting its "unusually sad and wistful nature". Kellermeyer suggests, "what James is deeply concerned about in this story is the problem of mortality and the perseverance of evil in spite of civilization's best efforts". Kellermeyer further describes the story as "one of James' more opaque and confusing", being part of what he describes as James' "puzzle-story phase", consisting of oblique tales that require an unusual amount of interpretation. Jack Sullivan writes "'The Story of a Disappearance and an Appearance,' 'Two Doctors', 'Mr. Humphreys and His Inheritance" and 'Rats' read more like dark enigmas than finished works of fiction."

Rosemary Pardoe describes the story as one of James' "lesser tales".

Jane Mainley-Piddock writes "The story is striking with its undertones of hidden sexual projection" and that "The dream projection scene has sexual undertones with the hooding and tying down of the victim and the scene is also saturated with sexual sadism."

== Adaptations ==
In 2008, BBC Audio released the audiobook Ghost Stories v.1, which included a reading of "The Story of a Disappearance and an Appearance" by Sir Derek Jacobi.

In 2016, an animated film adaptation of "The Story of a Disappearance and an Appearance" directed by Richard Mansfield and written and narrated by Silas Hawkins was released.
