= An Episode of Cathedral History =

- Short story by M. R. James
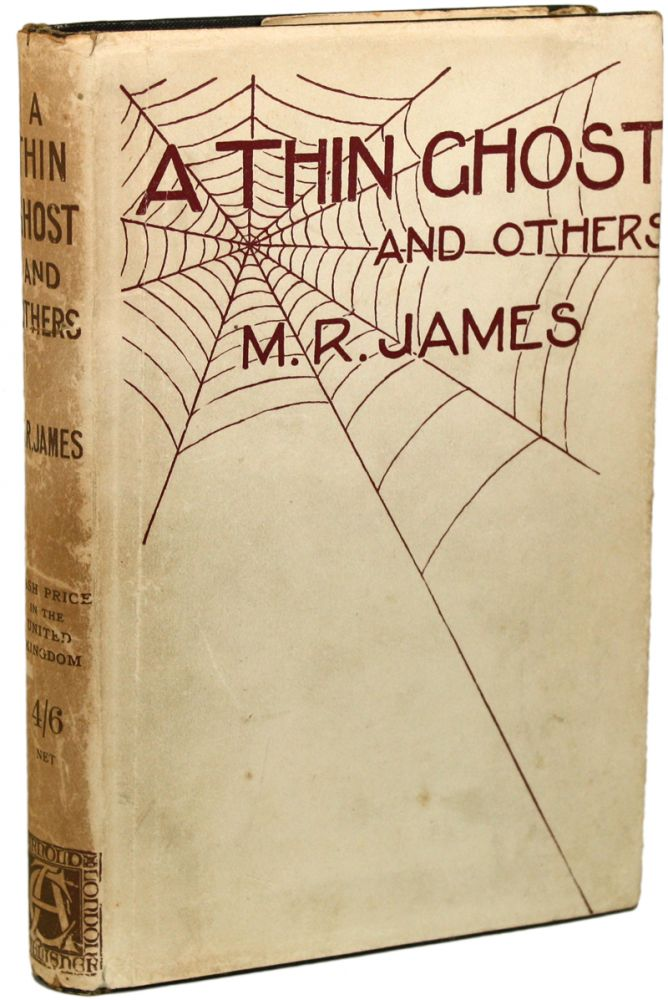
- "An Episode of Cathedral History" was collected in A Thin Ghost and Others in 1919

Text available at Wikisource
- Country: England
- Language: English
- Genre: Horror short story

Publication
- Published in: The Cambridge Review
- Media type: Print, magazine
- Publication date: 10 June 1914

"An Episode of Cathedral History" is a ghost story by the English writer M. R. James, first published in The Cambridge Review on 10 June 1914, and later collected in his books A Thin Ghost and Others (1919) and The Collected Ghost Stories of M. R. James (1931). Sometimes considered a work of vampire fiction, it concerns an incident in Southminster in 1840 where the renovation of a cathedral choir results in the emergence of a malicious creature from a fifteenth century altar-tomb.

== Plot summary ==
In the story's framing device, taking place in 1890, the "learned gentleman" Mr. Lake is dispatched to the Cathedral of Southminster to assess its archives. (Note: Southminster does not possess a cathedral. James describes his fictional cathedral as a blend of Canterbury Cathedral, Hereford Cathedral, and Salisbury Cathedral.) During his visit, Lake lodges with Mr. Worby, the Cathedral's principal verger. One evening, Worby invites Lake to accompany him on a visit to the Cathedral to retrieve some papers. During the visit, Worby points out a fifteenth century altar-tomb adorned with a simple cross, awkwardly located close to the stone screen of the choir. After the men return to Worby's house, he tells Mr. Lake a story about the altar-tomb.

Worby was born in 1828, and went on to perform in the Cathedral's choir. In summer 1840, Worby's father—a stonemason—was instructed by the Cathedral's new dean, Burscough, to clear out the Cathedral's choir as part of a controversial Gothic Revival-inspired refurbishment. One elderly canon, Dr. Ayloff, strenuously objects to the removal of the pulpit and refuses to enter the Cathedral, dying soon after. The removal of the pulpit's base reveals the altar-tomb, which had been boxed-in; the tomb's inhabitant cannot be identified. There is a gap between two of the slabs making up the altar-tomb.

During the summer, several older people die and many younger people are bedridden with illness; a belief grows that the alterations to the choir are somehow responsible. The widow of a former verger dreams of a "[red-eyed] shape that slipped out of the little door of the south transept as the dark fell in, and flitted—taking a fresh direction every night—about the close, disappearing for a while in house after house, and finally emerging again when the night sky was paling" shortly before dying.

During the summer, a fellow of the Society of Antiquaries of London visits the Cathedral. During the visit, his wife sits on the altar-tomb while sketching a diaper-ornament. Upon finishing, she finds a jagged tear in her skirt. At night-times, Worby's dog grows reluctant to be put outside, and sinister noises known as "the crying" are heard around Southminster; Worby overhears a conversation between two canons where one, Lyall, obliquely describes the noises as being that of a "satyr". A watch is set in the close, but to no avail.

Worby overhears Palmer, a mason overseeing works to the Cathedral, scolding one of his men for failing to properly repair the gap in the altar-tomb; the fresh plaster has been "blowed out". Looking through the gap, Worby's friend Evans claims to see "something shiny" inside the altar-tomb. After Palmer and the workmen leave, Evans rolls up a music sheet and pokes it into the gap; when he withdraws it, the paper is torn, wet, and blackened.

One night sometime later, Worby is awoken by the crying, which sounds "dreadful near"; looking out his window, he sees "two spots of red" in the shadow under a buttress. The next morning, overhearing his father say that an unusual piece of work has to be carried out in the Cathedral following the service, Worby and Evans hide in the triforium to watch. They see the Dean, Canon Henslow, Worby's father, Palmer, and two of Palmer's men locking the Cathedral. The Dean begrudgingly instructs Palmer to open-up the altar-tomb to "satisfy Southminster people". One of Palmer's men uses a crowbar to pry out the slab next to the gap. As the slab emerges, there is an inexplicable crashing sound, and the Dean is knocked over. Looking inside the altar-tomb, the Dean finds only the scrap of music paper and the torn piece of the skirt. The north door of the Cathedral is found to be open. Returning home, Worby confesses to his father about hiding in the triforium. Worby's father tells him that "A thing like a man, all over hair, and two great eyes to it [...] Black it was [...] and a mass of hair, and two legs, and the light caught on its eyes" came out of the altar-tomb and knocked the Dean over.

Finishing his story, Worby asks Lake not to share it until he and Evans are dead. Over 20 years later, following the deaths of Worby and Evans, Lake shares his notes of the story. He accompanies them with a sketch of the altar-tomb and a copy of the inscription added at the expense of canon Lyall, which reads "Ibi Cubavit Lamia". (Note: An extract from the Vulgate Isaiah 34:14; Latin for "Here lay the Lamia".)

== Publication ==
"An Episode of Cathedral History" was written in 1913 (or earlier) and first published in The Cambridge Review on 10 June 1914. In 1919, it was collected in A Thin Ghost and Others. In 1931, it was collected in James' book The Collected Ghost Stories of M. R. James. It has since been included in many anthologies, including collections of vampire fiction.

== Reception ==
S. T. Joshi describes "An Episode of Cathedral History" as "one of the most substantial of [James'] later ghost stories [which] emphasizes his distaste at the bungling 'restoration' of English churches in the mode of the Gothic revival". David Punter describes "An Episode of Cathedral History" as "in certain ways emblematic of [James'] stories as a whole", noting that James uses the story "to mount a further argument as to the rightness of letting things, particularly pre-Renaissance things, simply be".

Patrick J. Murphy and Fred Porcheddu describe "An Episode of Cathedral History" as "a study in the synchronic and the diachronic" and "a tale of the uneasy fortunes of communal history and memory". Peter Bell argues that the story "...is more than a vampire yarn or simple tale of ecclesiastical creepiness but, rather, a fascinating synthesis of interlocking traditions emanating from English and European folklore, Near Eastern cults, the Classics, and the Bible, woven into the sort of tapestry in which [James] excelled."

Paul Adams describes "An Episode of Cathedral History" as "a middle-period work with vampire elements" with "a characteristically Jamesian plot device of a disturbed antiquarian object releasing a deadly revenant or a supernatural force."

Some have considered "An Episode of Cathedral History" to be a sequel or companion piece to James' 1895 story "Canon Alberic's Scrap-Book" as it features a similar creature, obliquely suggested to be the mate of the one encountered in "Canon Alberic's Scrap-Book". "An Episode of Cathedral History" is one of a small number of James' stories not to take place in the countryside.

Jane Mainley-Piddock writes "The symbolism of a very much alive old god in the very breast of the new religion is redolent of James's fears for the sanctity of the church and its ability to appeal to the new generation. It is almost as if the remodelling of the interior of the church caused it to fight internally. This was arguably reflected in the two movements debated in the church of James's day, especially the Low Evangelical church championed by James's university of Cambridge and the high Anglican/Catholic Oxford Movement of the University of Oxford, one standing for the old body of the church, one its more Low Church soul or conscience. This dichotomy would play itself out in James's own life."

Daniel Frampton offers "An Episode of Cathedral History" as an example of stories by James that "exhibit a supernaturally-charged reality that was 'terrifyingly alive'.", writing "[James'] ghosts are novel in that they are 'embodied terrors' that can be touched."

Jack Sullivan writes "Though James's rendering of dialect is skillful and idiomatic, he tends to overuse these servant recapitulations of horror scenes. After a while, the cockney narrators—in 'A View from a Hill,' and 'An Episode of Cathedral History,' among others—become an annoying mannerism."

== Adaptations ==
In September 1977, an article named "The Demon in the Cathedral" authored by Robert Freeman Bound and Ramon A. Pantoja Lopez was published in Fate. The article concerned a purportedly true series of supernatural events that took place in the Mexico City Metropolitan Cathedral in 1629. While Bound and Lopez claimed that the article was based upon an "ancient manuscript", the article was found to have borrowed details from "An Episode of Cathedral History".
