= Temple Grove School =

Preparatory school in England

Coordinates: 51°1′29″N 0°6′54″E

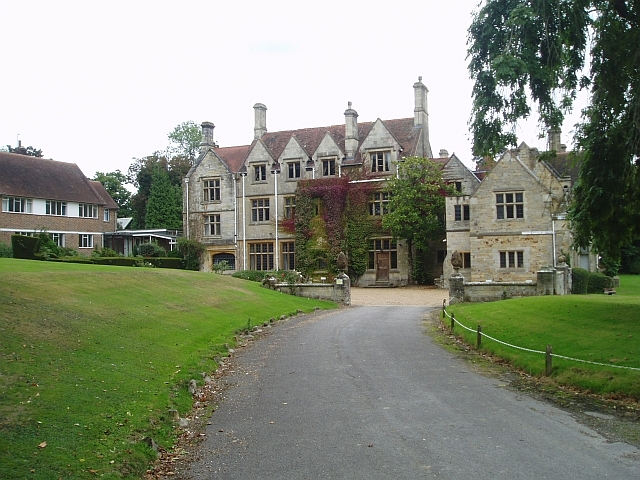
Temple Grove School

Temple Grove School was a preparatory school for boys, and after 1984 also for girls, originally at Parsons Green, London, later at East Sheen, London, still later at Eastbourne, and finally at Heron's Ghyll, an estate between Uckfield and Crowborough in East Sussex. Founded before 1803 at Parsons Green, where it was known as Elm House, before it gained the name of Temple Grove, a house at East Sheen, the school survived to become one of the oldest preparatory schools in England, but in 2005 it finally closed.

In the 19th century the school was also sometimes called by the name of the headmaster of the day, as in Mr Waterfield's, East Sheen, or Mr Edgar's.

== History ==
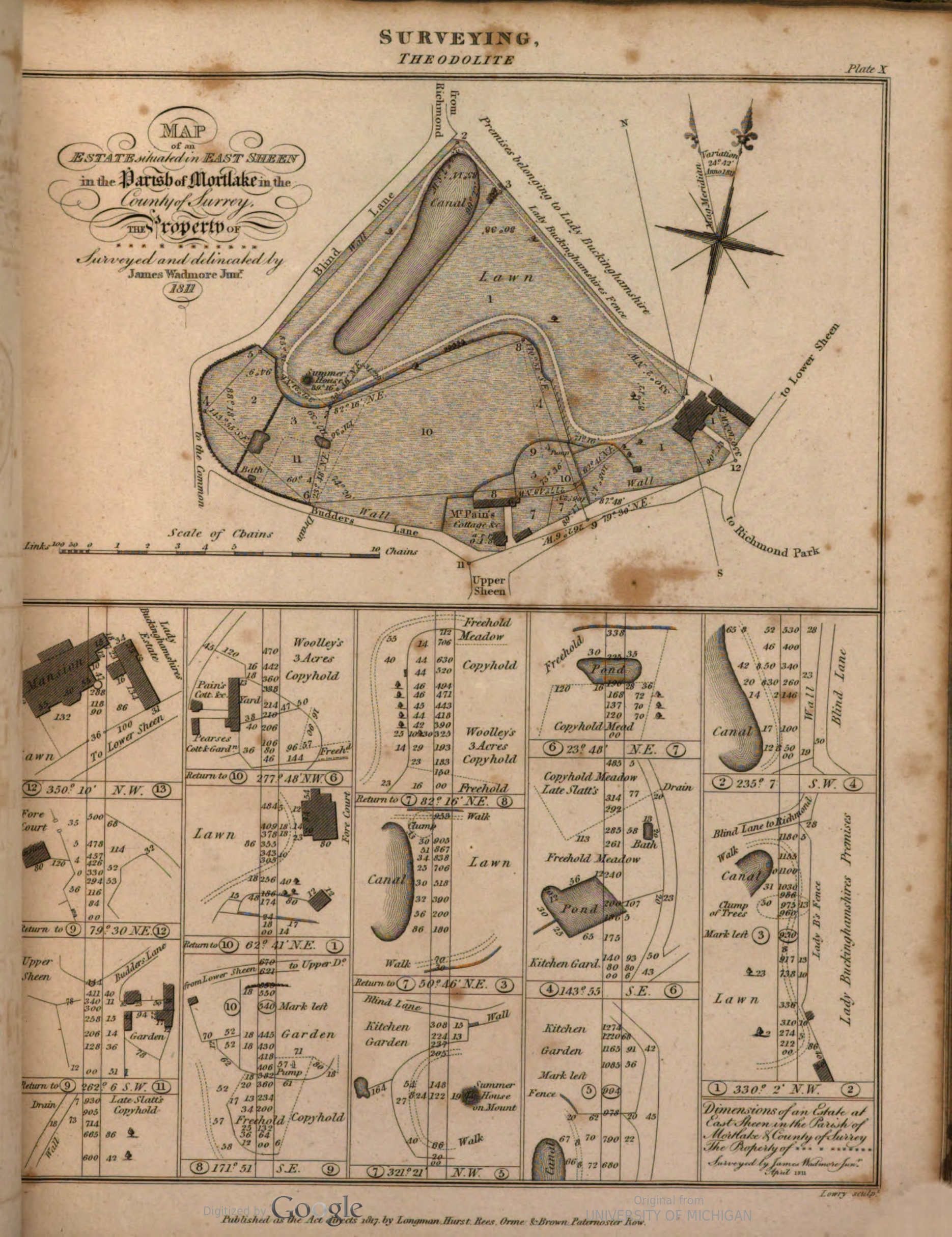
An 1811 survey of the site of Temple Grove School, East Sheen

The school was founded before 1803 at Elm House, Parsons Green. In 1810 its headmaster, Dr Pearson, moved it to East Sheen, occupying an old house called Sheen Grove, or Temple Grove, so called because it was believed to have been the home of the 17th century diplomat and politician Sir William Temple when he lived at Sheen with Jonathan Swift as his secretary. The school remained there for almost a hundred years. During the 19th century it rose to become one of the "Famous Five" of English prep schools, defined by one writer as "schools to which a duke would be pleased to send his sons". Despite that, it was primitive and gave boys a Spartan upbringing; it was reported that in winter "In the dormitories, snow piled frequently upon the blankets and ice formed on the water jugs".

In 1907, the school moved from East Sheen to the New College buildings at Eastbourne, at a time when East Sheen had changed its character, having been engulfed by the London suburbs. The Eastbourne building then transformed in 2013 into a mixed free school for students between 4 and 19 years old, Gildredge House Free School.By the 1930s the new Eastbourne site was proving expensive to maintain, so a search was begun for a new site, and dozens of possibilities were explored. In September 1935, Temple Grove moved again to Heron's Ghyll, a country house with thirty acres of land near Uckfield.

In 1957, with the departure of a headmaster, Meston Batchelor, the school was formed into a charitable trust. Since it closed in 2005, its name has been continued by the trust, which supports education in the locality, notably sponsoring the Temple Grove Academy in nearby Tunbridge Wells. The school's own former premises were sold to Stonehurst Estates, which converted the main house into flats.

== Headmasters ==
- 1810–1817: Rev. Dr William Pearson (also an astronomer)
- 1817–1835: Rev. Dr J. H. Pinckney
- 1835–1843: J. Thompson
- 1845–1863: Rev. Dr George Croke Rowden (also a composer)
- 1863–1880: Ottiwell Waterfield
- 1880–1893: Rev. J. H. Edgar
- 1894–1902: Rev. H. B. Allen
- 1902–1934: Rev. H. W. Waterfield
- 1934–1957: Meston Batchelor
- Oliver Lough
- Rev Tim Sterry
- 1980-1991: S. B. Beresford-Davies
- 1991-1992: Simon Amos Blackmore
- 1992-2001 Jenny Lee

== Notable pupils ==
See also Category:People educated at Temple Grove School

The old boys of Temple Grove include:

- Alfred Dyke Acland, soldier
- Douglas Bader, Royal Air Force officer
- Robert Hamilton, 12th Lord Belhaven and Stenton, colonial administrator and author
- A. C. Benson, author and academic
- E. F. Benson, author
- Villiers Richard Bootle-Wilbraham (1867–1913), 2nd son of Edward Bootle-Wilbraham, 1st Earl of Lathom
- James Broun-Ramsay, 1st Marquess of Dalhousie, Governor-General of India
- Sir Alan Gardiner, Egyptologist
- Edward Grey, 1st Viscount Grey of Fallodon, British Foreign Secretary
- Pen Hadow, explorer
- Cuthbert Heath, insurance pioneer
- Jeremy Hunt, MP
- M. R. James, author and academic
- Brian Johnston, BBC cricket broadcaster
- John Murray III, publisher
- William Palmer, 2nd Earl of Selborne, politician and colonial administrator
- Francis Pryor, archaeologist and landscape historian
- Douglas Sladen, author and academic
- Arthur Wellesley, 2nd Duke of Wellington
- Niklas Ekstedt, Swedish Chef and author

== Literature ==
M. R. James identified Temple Grove School as the setting for his short ghost story "A School Story" published in More Ghost Stories of an Antiquary.

== See also ==
- Skidmore College, an unrelated liberal arts college in Saratoga Springs, New York, was originally known as Temple Grove Ladies Seminary
