= Chrishall =

Village in Essex, England

Coordinates: 52.032°N 0.109°E

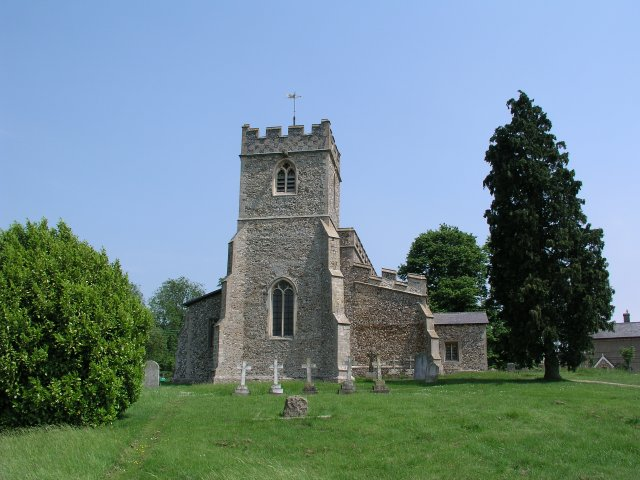
- Holy Trinity Church, Chrishall

- Location within Essex
- Population: 577 (Parish, 2021)
- OS grid reference: TL446392
- Civil parish: Chrishall
- District: Uttlesford
- Shire county: Essex
- Region: East
- Country: England
- Sovereign state: United Kingdom
- Post town: ROYSTON
- Postcode district: SG8
- Dialling code: 01763
- Police: Essex
- Fire: Essex
- Ambulance: East of England
- UK Parliament: North West Essex
- Website: Chrishall Parish Council

Chrishall (pronounced Chris hall) is a small village and civil parish in the Uttlesford district of Essex, England. The village lies close to the borders with Cambridgeshire and Hertfordshire, 12 miles (20 km) south of Cambridge and equidistant [6 miles (10 km)] between the two medieval market towns of Saffron Walden and Royston. At the 2021 census the parish had a population of 577.

The village was listed in the Domesday Book as Cristeshalla, or "nook of land dedicated to Christ". In 1422 (1 Henry VI), it appears in a record as "Cristeshale".

The Icknield Way, a Neolithic track, passes through the parish.

Chrishall's location is key to its character; as the village sits at the highest point in Essex, at 147 metres (482 ft) above sea level, road construction has avoided this high ground and therefore Chrishall is off the beaten track. Despite its relative isolation the village retains facilities such as a pre-school as well as a primary school. The village also boasts a sports field, a new playground, a church, a village hall and many clubs and societies as well as the Red Cow public house.

Notable residents include the composer, John Rutter.

== History ==
Following the Norman Conquest, the area around Chrishall was given to Eustace of Boulogne, who built and occupied a house on a hill to the south of the current church. He named the house "Flanders", and it was there that his daughter Matilda of Boulogne, later wife of King Stephen, was raised. A letter survives that the queen wrote to Hubert the Chamberlain, ordering that the residents of Chrishall be looked after. The house survived until the 15th century, and is believed to have stood on the site of Chiswick Hall, itself built in the 17th century by Sir John James (d.1676).

The village has been home to a church for over a thousand years. Prior to the Norman invasion a small church dedicated to the Virgin Mary was situated on the site of the present church.

The current church was begun in the 12th century. It consists of a nave and aisles, a chancel, and a stone tower containing six bells. It was appropriated, at an early period, to Westminster Abbey.

The church contains a number of monumental brasses, including a notable one in memory of Sir John de la Pole and his wife, dating from 1380.

== Chrishall Common ==
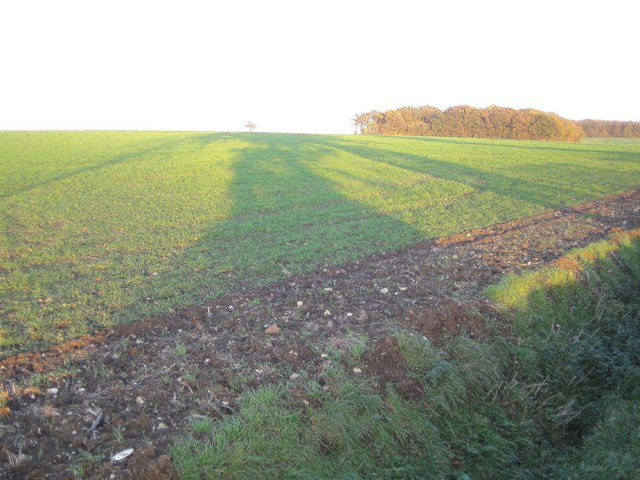
Chrishall Common

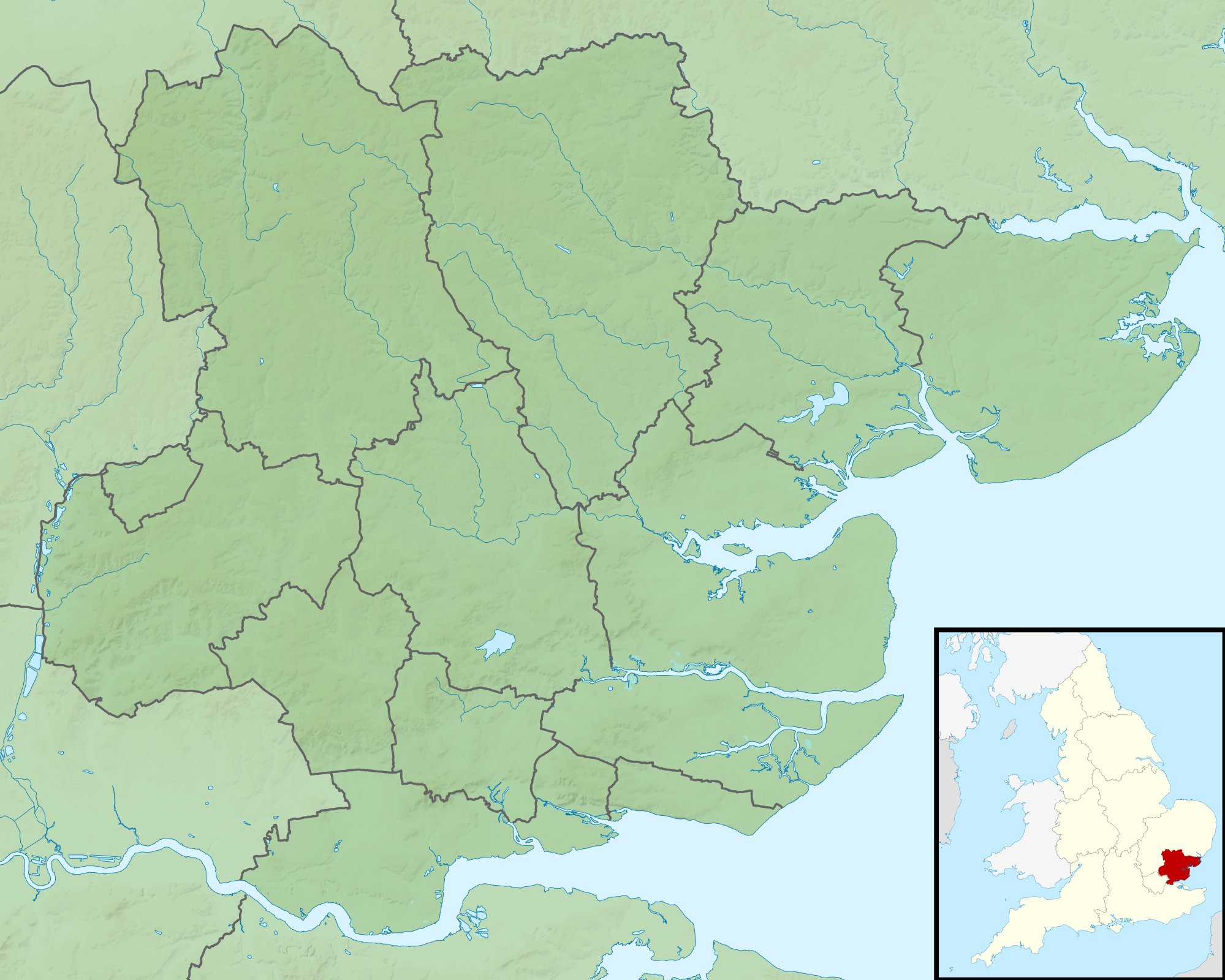
Chrishall Common in Essex

At the edge of the parish is Chrishall Common, a hill which at 147 metres (482 ft) is a County Top: the highest point in Essex, and also of East Anglia.

== Buildings ==
The village has a pub, church, primary school, village hall and adventure playground.

The barn attached to The Red Cow public house is the oldest building in Chrishall apart from the church, and is believed to date to 1500. There was once a village shop in front of the pub, however this is now closed.

Holy Trinity Church, a 12th-century Grade I Listed Building, is situated on the edge of the main village. A comprehensive set of images and the detailed history of Holy Trinity appear on the parish website.

In the centre of the village lies Chrishall Holy Trinity and St. Nicholas C of E Primary School, Jigney's meadow and the adventure playground.

The village hall has recently been relocated to the Methodist chapel in Crawley End.

== Literature ==
Chrishall is the presumed location featuring in the short ghost story "The Story of a Disappearance and an Appearance" by M.R. James, published in A Thin Ghost and Others in 1919. This is an epistolary short story, and the first of its four letters is sent from 'Great Chrishall'.

== See also ==
- The Hundred Parishes
