= Rats (short story) =

- Short story by M. R. James
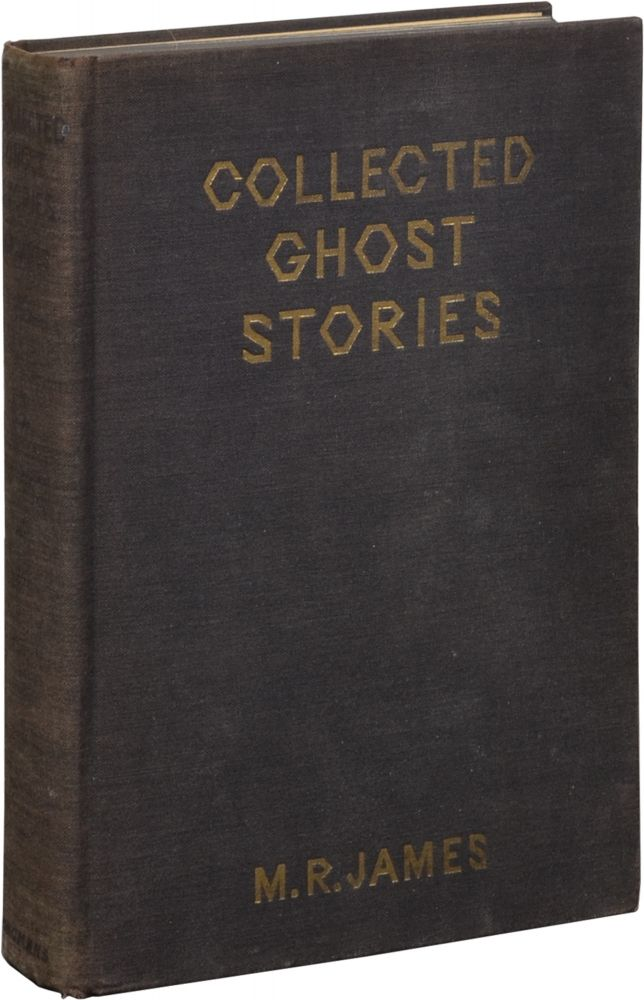
- "Rats" was collected in The Collected Ghost Stories of M. R. James in 1931
- Country: England
- Language: English
- Genre: Ghost story

Publication
- Published in: At Random
- Publisher: Eton College
- Media type: Magazine
- Publication date: 1929

"Rats" is a ghost story by the English writer M. R. James, first published in 1929 in the Eton College magazine At Random, and collected in James's book The Collected Ghost Stories of M. R. James in 1931. Set in 1846, it concerns a locked inn bedroom haunted by the ghost of a highwayman. It has been adapted for radio many times, with various readings and radio plays airing on the BBC Home Service and BBC Radio 4.

== Plot summary ==
The story opens with a quotation from the 1861 short story "Tom Tiddler's Ground" by Charles Dickens:

"And if you was to walk through the bedrooms now, you'd see the ragged, mouldy bedclothes a-heaving and a-heaving like seas." "And a-heaving and a-heaving with what?" he says. "Why, with the rats under 'em."

The narrator refers to another story he has heard, where it was not rats causing the bedclothes to move. The story takes place in the spring of 1846, in coastal Suffolk. (Note: Peter Haining identifies the story as being set in Thorpeness.) The narrator's friend Mr. Thomson, a student of the University of Cambridge, has leased a room in a 1770s inn, being "desirous of solitude in tolerable quarters and time for reading". He is the only lodger of the inn, staying on the first floor.

One day, while walking over a heath near the inn, Thomson sees a white object some distance from the road which draws his attention. Approaching, he finds it to be a square block of white stone with a square hole in it. The inn's landlord, Mr. Betts, is vague when asked about the stone.

One afternoon, while taking a break from his work, Thomson impulsively decides to explore the other rooms on his floor of the inn. The first three rooms he explores are unremarkable, The final room, to the southwest, is locked. Thomson, curious, tries the keys of the other rooms, one of which fits the lock. He finds the room is unfurnished besides an iron bed covered with a counterpane. Thomson is startled to see a shape beneath the counterpane, which moves, causing him to leave the room. As he re-locks the door, he hears "a stumbling padding tread". Returning to his room, Thomson considers immediately leaving the inn, but ultimately resolves that "...either the Bettses knew all about the inmate, and yet did not leave the house, or knew nothing, which equally meant that there was nothing to be afraid of, or knew just enough to make them shut up the room, but not enough to weigh on their spirits" and decides to stay.

During the final week of his stay, Thomson avoids the door to the room, but increasingly longs for an explanation. Finally, he decides that immediately before departing the inn, after his luggage has been loaded on the fly, he will return upstairs under the pretence of checking he has left nothing behind, then look in the room again. Opening the door, Thomson laughs to see a "scarecrow" sitting on the edge of the bed, but then realises the "scarecrow" has "bare bony feet", a lolling head, and an iron collar round its neck. After the "scarecrow" stands and walks stiffly towards Thomson, he slams the door closed and flees downstairs, fainting.

Thomson is revived by Betts, who tells him the story behind the apparition. The figure is the former landlord of the inn, who was also a highwayman; after being caught, he was chained and hanged from a gallows that stood on the white stone Thomson had seen earlier (the gallows itself having been taken down by local fisherman who regarded it as unlucky). At the advice of the former landlords of the inn, Betts has kept the room locked and not removed the bed, which has avoided any trouble. Betts asks Thomson to refrain from talking about the incident to avoid damaging the inn's reputation.

The narrator closes by saying that when Thomson came to stay with the narrator's father, when the narrator showed him to his bedroom, Thomson insisted on throwing the door open and scrutinising the room, saying "Very absurd, but I can't help doing that, for a particular reason."

== Publication ==
"Rats" was first published in At Random, an Eton College magazine, on 23 March 1929. Later that year, it was included in the anthology Shudders: A Collection of New Nightmare Tales edited by Lady Cynthia Asquith. In 1931, it was collected in James's book The Collected Ghost Stories of M. R. James. It has since been included in many anthologies.

== Reception ==
Michael Cox states that "Rats" "recalls M. R. James at his best". Richard William Pfaff describes "Rats" as "...a fine piece in the vein of the very earliest stories, except that the hero is not a don but a Cambridge undergraduate".

B. W. Young describes the story as "firmly rooted in the experience of the long eighteenth century".

Jane Mainley-Piddock writes that

...the feeling of Unheimleich [sic] reaches its apex, as his revenant is protected and housed by two of the characters. Both the living and un-living are amongst the other lodgers in an inn [...] The story has definitely taken on a very modernist turn as the living have been alienated completely. Who belongs here? Who has the right to occupy this space? James has used an older agent of the gothic (the zombie) to question the position of the self in a newly fractured world. [...] This story is complete in its uncanny feeling of near-complete madness in which nothing is as it seems. The alienation of the living by the dead has taken a new twist and they occupy the same space. [...] [T]he positions of reanimated corpse as burglar, and the living as householder have now been reversed. James seems to be manipulating the conventions of the ghost story here, giving an insight into the anxieties of the modern age: our position in the universe is not guaranteed, and this is as bleak a depiction as any modernist wasteland.

Penny Fielding writes, "[C]ontrary to the reception of James as a master of the 'well-made tale,' 'Rats' is ill-proportioned, with an extensive and somewhat repetitive buildup to a conventional 'what's behind the locked door?' plot, followed by a cursory explanation about an executed murderer whose animated corpse may have been spotted."

Jack Sullivan writes "'The Story of a Disappearance and an Appearance,' 'Two Doctors', 'Mr. Humphreys and His Inheritance" and 'Rats' read more like dark enigmas than finished works of fiction."

== Adaptations ==
On 16 June 1949, the BBC Home Service broadcast a 15-minute reading of "Rats" performed by Anthony Jacobs.

On 27 December 1977, BBC producer Michell Raper presented a 30-minute talk entitled The Ghosts of M. R. James on BBC Radio 4, which featured a reading from "Rats".

On 15 November 1982, BBC Radio 4 broadcast a reading of "Rats" by Richard Hurndall in the 15-minute Morning Story slot.

On 9 June 1986, BBC Radio 4 transmitted another reading of "Rats" on Morning Story, this time read by James Aubrey. The 15-minute show was repeated on 7 October 2018 on Radio 4 Extra.

On 3 January 1998, BBC Radio 4 aired a reading of "Rats" by Benjamin Whitrow as part of The Late Book: Ghost Stories.

In April 2007, Fantom Films released the audiobook Tales of the Supernatural, which included a reading of "Rats" by Ian Fairbairn.

In 2008, BBC Audio released the audiobook Ghost Stories v.1, which included a reading of "Rats" by Sir Derek Jacobi.

On 22 December 2018, an original drama based on "Rats" written by Neil Brand aired on BBC Radio 4 as part of the series, The Haunting of M. R. James. It starred Mark Gatiss as M. R. James and Fenella Woolgar as Gwendolyn MacBryde.

In 2018, Shadows at the Door: The Podcast began a series of full-cast adaptations of James' stories, including "Rats".
