= A School Story =

- Short story by M. R. James
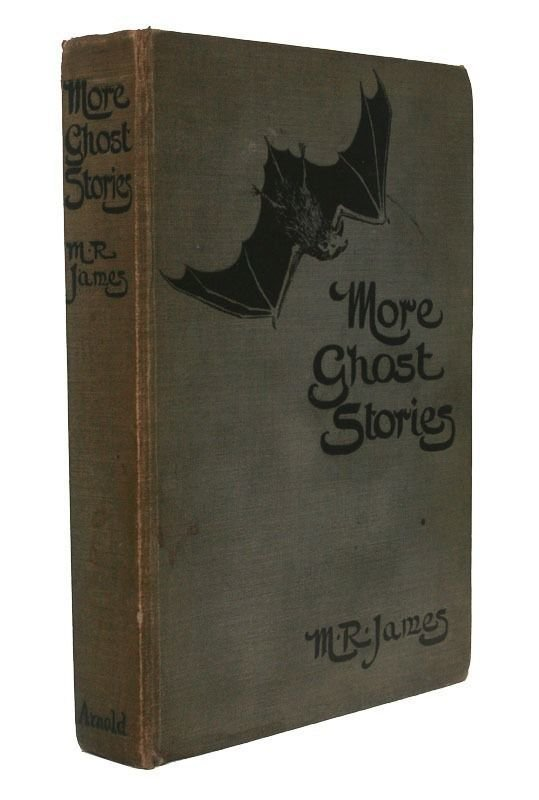
- "A School Story" was published in More Ghost Stories of an Antiquary in 1911.

Text available at Wikisource
- Country: England
- Language: English
- Genre: Horror

Publication
- Published in: More Ghost Stories of an Antiquary
- Publication type: Book
- Publisher: Edward Arnold
- Publication date: 1911

"A School Story" is a ghost story by British writer M. R. James, first published in his 1911 collection More Ghost Stories of an Antiquary.

== Plot summary ==
Two men are discussing the folklore of the private schools they attended. One, who attended a school near London (Note: Identified by James as Temple Grove School, his alma mater.) around 1870, tells of a Latin teacher named Mr. Sampson who kept an engraved Byzantine coin from Constantinople that he would show his students. During a Latin grammar exercise, the narrator's friend, McLeod, gives the teacher a strange message in Latin which translates to "remember the well among the four yews", though he doesn't know why he wrote it. Mr. Sampson appears confused and unnerved by the message. Following the incident, McLeod is taken ill.

Around one month later, when the class are writing conditional sentences, another paper shows up translating to "If you don't come to me, I'll come to you." Sampson is visibly worried, and abruptly leaves the class. The narrator notes that there are 16 boys in the class, but 17 pieces of paper have been placed on Sampson's desk. Also, the mysterious message is the only one written in red ink. The narrator keeps the mysterious piece of paper, but later finds that it has become blank.

The following night, McLeod sees a horribly thin, wet, corpse-like man sitting on Sampson's window-sill and beckoning to Sampson, but when he returns with the narrator the figure is gone. Sampson is missing the next day, and is never heard from again. Years later, a body is found – with Sampson's engraved coin – in the death-embrace of a second body, in a well that sits amongst yew trees.

== Publication ==
"A School Story" was written by James in 1906 or earlier to entertain the Choir of King's College, Cambridge, where James was Provost. It was first published in James' book More Ghost Stories of an Antiquary in 1911. In 1931, it was collected in James' book The Collected Ghost Stories of M. R. James. It has since been anthologised many times.

== Adaptations ==
On 27 October 1932, Vincent Curran read from "A School Story" during an interval on Regional Programme Midland.

On 28 November 1980, a reading of "A School Story" by Michael Bryant aired on BBC One's Spine Chillers programme.

On 1 January 1998, BBC Radio 4 aired "A School Story" as part of its programme The Late Book: Ghost Stories.

On 24 January 2004, BBC 7 broadcast Ghost Stories by MR James: A School Story.

On 29 October 2008, BBC Radio 7 broadcast an adaptation of "A School Story" read by Benjamin Whitrow as part of its Ghost Stories programme.
