= Frank Bevis =

British film producer and production manager (1907–2003)

- Born: 30 April 1907; Alverstoke, Hampshire, United Kingdom
- Died: 30 June 2003 (aged 96); Portsmouth, Hampshire, United Kingdom
- Occupations: Producer, production manager
- Years active: 1942–1981 (film)

Frank Bevis (1907–2003) was a British film producer and production manager.

== Selected filmography ==
- The Scarlet Web (1954)
- The Weapon (1956)
- Night of the Demon (1957)
- Death Over My Shoulder (1958)
- Nudist Paradise (1958)
- The Iron Maiden (1962)
- Nurse on Wheels (1963)
- Carry On Cabby (1963)
- Carry On Cleo (1964)
- Carry On Spying (1964)
- Carry On Jack (1964)
- Carry On Cowboy (1965)
- The Big Job (1965)
- Carry On Screaming! (1966)
- The Limbo Line (1968)
- Rosie Dixon – Night Nurse (1978)
- The Thirty Nine Steps (1978)

== Bibliography ==
- Fujiwara, Chris. Jacques Tourneur: The Cinema of Nightfall. McFarland, 1998.
