= A Thin Ghost and Others =

Third ghost story collection by M.R. James

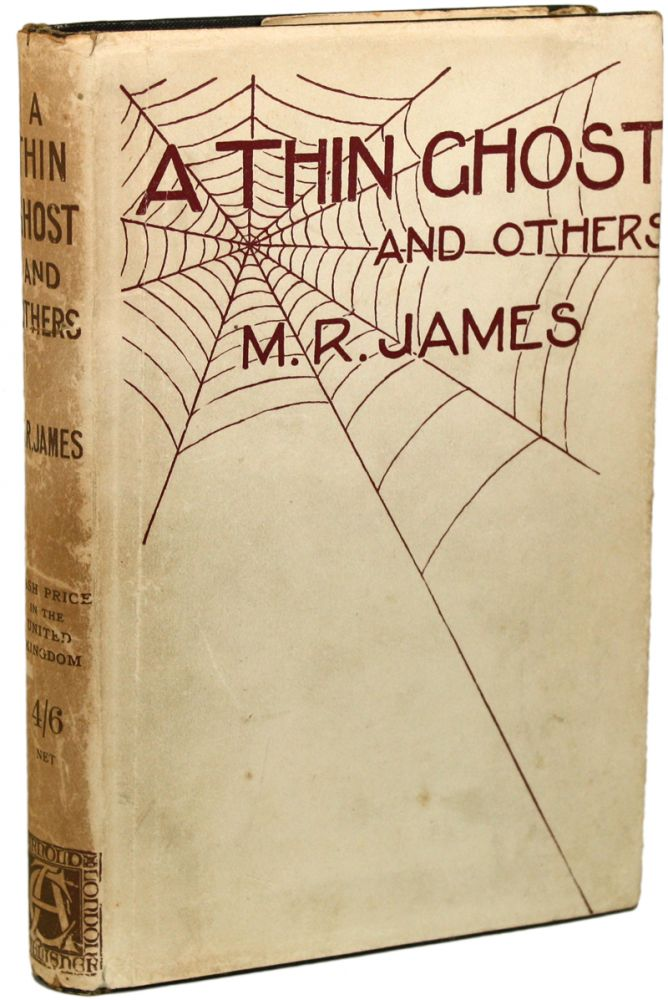
- Author: M. R. James
- Language: English
- Genre: Horror
- Publisher: Edward Arnold
- Publication date: 1919
- Publication place: United Kingdom
- Media type: Print (hardback)
- Preceded by: More Ghost Stories of an Antiquary
- Followed by: A Warning to the Curious and Other Ghost Stories

A Thin Ghost and Others is a horror short story collection by British writer M. R. James, published in 1919. It was his third short collection. "The Story of a Disappearance and an Appearance" and "An Episode of Cathedral History" had been previously published in The Cambridge Review in 1913 and 1914 respectively; the other stories were first published in this collection.

Several stories in this collection are part of what critic Michael Kellermeyer describes as James' "puzzle-story phase," consisting of oblique tales that require an unusual amount of interpretation.

"An Episode of Cathedral History" has been seen as a sequel or companion piece to James' earlier story "Canon Alberic's Scrap-Book", which features a similar creature.

== Contents of the original edition ==
- "The Residence at Whitminster"
- "The Diary of Mr. Poynter"
- "An Episode of Cathedral History"
- "The Story of a Disappearance and an Appearance"
- "Two Doctors"

== Sources ==
- "M.R. James: free web books, online". Archived from the original on 30 September 2009.
