= The Rose Garden (short story) =

- Short story by M.R. James
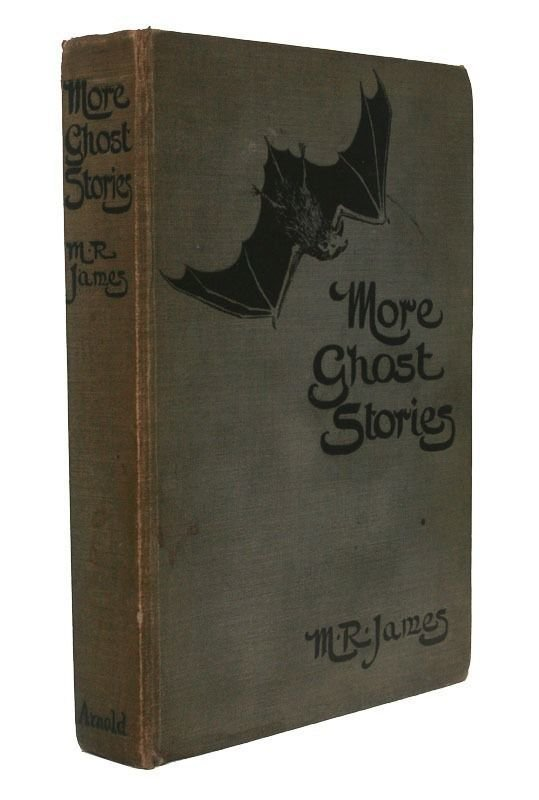
- "The Rose Garden" was published in More Ghost Stories of an Antiquary in 1911

Text available at Wikisource
- Country: England
- Language: English
- Genre: Ghost story

Publication
- Published in: More Ghost Stories of an Antiquary
- Publisher: Penguin Books
- Media type: Print
- Publication date: 1911

"The Rose Garden" is a ghost story by the English writer M. R. James, first published as part of his 1911 collection More Ghost Stories of an Antiquary.

== Plot summary ==
Mrs. Mary Anstruther of Westfield Hall in Essex asks her husband George to arrange with Collins, their gardener, for a clearing in the Hall's grounds near a churchyard to be prepared so she can plant a rose garden. The clearing is occupied by an elderly corrugated oak post that is firmly rooted in the ground. Mrs. Anstruther is visited by Miss Wilkins, a member of the family who formerly owned Westfield Hall, who tells Mary that as a child she and her brother were frightened of the clearing. At the age of eight, her brother fell asleep in a summer house that formerly stood in the clearing, and dreamed of being put on trial and then taken to be executed, while Miss Wilkins heard a mysterious voice while reading in the arbour. After Miss Wilkins' father had the summer house demolished, an elderly man who worked on the estate cryptically remarked "Don't you fear for that, sir: he's fast enough in there without no one don't take and let him out."

Following the removal of the post, Mrs. Anstruther has an uneasy night, hearing "roughs" talking and laughing in the grounds of the Hall and what she believes to be an owl outside her bedroom window. Mr. Anstruther has an unpleasant dream about being put on trial, with the prosecutor "pitching into me most unfairly, and twisting everything I said, and asking most abominable questions", and then taken to be executed. Noting the similarities to Miss Wilkins' brother's dream, Mrs. Anstruther suggests that "I suppose this is an instance of a kind of thought-reading". Early that evening, while walking through the Hall's grounds, Mrs. Anstruther sees a sinister face looking out of a bush, causing her to flee to the Hall and faint.

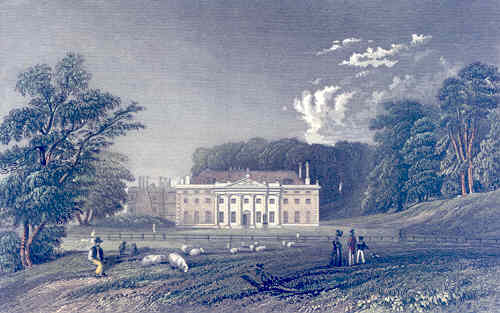
Weald Hall in Essex, the home of Sir William Scroggs, which may have inspired Westfield Hall

Sometime later, the Anstruthers are approached by the Essex Archæological Society, who are enquiring after historic portraits. The Society is particularly seeking a portrait of "Sir —— ——", the Lord Chief Justice of Charles II of England, who retired to Westfield Hall in disgrace. (Note: S. T. Joshi suggests that this refers to Sir William Scroggs, the Lord Chief Justice of England who presided over the Popish Plot trials, who was dismissed by Charles II after being impeached for summarily dismissing a grand jury, and retired to Weald Hall in Essex where he died shortly after.) Following his death, the parish was "so much troubled" that the parsons of The Roothings were obliged to "come and lay him" by planting a stake in the ground. The Society include a photograph of the portrait in question; upon recognising the face that looked out of the bush, Mrs. Anstruther suffers a severe shock and must travel abroad to recuperate.

Mr. Anstruther speaks with the elderly rector of Westfield, who notes that the village has also heard the voices of men and the sound of owls during the night, but that it is diminishing and he expects it will cease altogether. Consulting the register of the burial, the rector notes that one of the previous rectors has added the phrase "quieta non movere". (Note: Latin for "[One must] not move quiet things".)

== Publication ==
"The Rose Garden" was first published in More Ghost Stories of an Antiquary in 1911. In 1931, it was collected in James' book The Collected Ghost Stories of M. R. James. It has since been anthologised many times.

== Reception ==
Jane Mainley-Piddock writes "This story features three concurrently running aspects: a meditation on marriage, a parable on the idea of 'letting sleeping dogs lie' and a sinister story of what can happen when the past intrudes into the present."

Jacqueline Simpson argues that "The Rose Garden" is inspired by Danish folklore. Similarly, Christopher Roden suggests that James may have been inspired by Jutland folklorist Evald Tang Kristensen, who wrote about the practice of "'staking' a particularly vicious ghost".

S. T. Joshi states "...the tale is so obliquely told that it is difficult to ascertain what exactly happened." Similarly, Bob Hodges describes "The Rose Garden" as "highly elliptical" and "rely[ing] on the reader to make inferences from [its] sparse details."

== Adaptations ==
On 27 August 1968, BBC Radio 4 FM broadcast a reading of "The Rose Garden" by Howieson Culff as part of its Story Time programme.

On 14 June 1982, BBC Radio 4 broadcast a reading of "The Rose Garden" by Richard Hurndall in the 15-minute Morning Story slot.

On 30 December 1986, BBC Two broadcast a reading of "The Rose Garden" by Robert Powell as part of its Classic Ghost Stories programme.

On 27 December 2007, BBC Radio 4 FM broadcast an adaptation of "The Rose Garden" written by Chris Harrald, starring Derek Jacobi as M. R. James, Anton Lesser as George, and Carolyn Pickles as Mary.
