= Casting the Runes =

1911 short story by M. R. James

- Short story by M. R. James
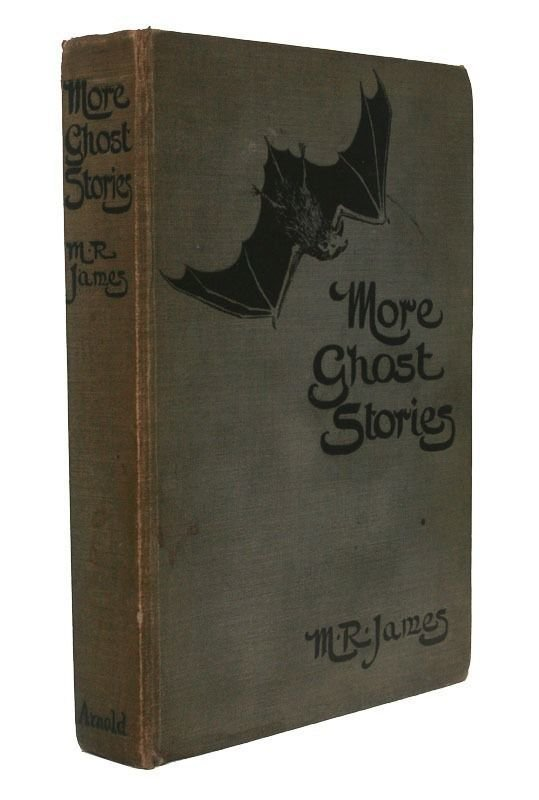
- "Casting the Runes" was published in More Ghost Stories of an Antiquary in 1911

Text available at Wikisource
- Country: United Kingdom
- Language: English
- Genre: Horror

Publication
- Published in: More Ghost Stories of an Antiquary
- Publisher: Edward Arnold
- Publication date: 1911

"Casting the Runes" is a short story written by the English writer M. R. James. It was first published in 1911 as the fourth story in More Ghost Stories of an Antiquary, which was James' second collection of ghost stories.

== Plot summary ==
Edward Dunning is a researcher for the British Museum. At the beginning of the story he has recently reviewed The Truth of Alchemy, a paper submitted to an association by Karswell, an alchemist and occultist from Lufford Abbey in Warwickshire, and advised that the paper be rejected. The secretary of the association, Gayton, visits a friend in Warwickshire, where he asks about Karswell. The friend recounts a notorious incident from several years prior when Karswell had offered to put on a magic lantern show for schoolchildren, then terrified them by showing slides depicting scenes such as a "dreadful" version of Little Red Riding Hood, a boy in the grounds of Lufford Abbey being pursued and killed by "a horrible hopping creature in white", and "a great mass of snakes, centipedes, and disgusting creatures with wings". Gayton recalls that 10 years ago Karswell had published a book, History of Witchcraft, which received a scathing review from John Harrington. Harrington died in 1889 from a broken neck after scaling a tree in a country lane while fleeing a mysteriously pursuer and falling out, breaking his neck; his brother Henry has been investigating his death ever since. As Gayton and his wife travel home, they hope that Karswell will not learn that it was Dunning who led to his paper being rejected.

While travelling home by tram, Dunning sees a mysterious advertisement reading: "In memory of John Harrington, F.S.A., of The Laurels Ashbrooke. Died Sept. 18th, 1889. Three months were allowed." The next day, the advertisement has inexplicably vanished without trace. Later that week, Dunning is handed a leaflet bearing the name "Harrington"; before he can fully read it, it is twitched out of his hand. On 23 April, while working in the British Museum, Dunning hears his name whispered; turning around quickly, he knocks a sheaf of manuscripts to the ground. While collecting them, he is handed a quire by a stout man. Leaving the Museum later that day, Dunning asks an assistant about the stout man; he learns that it was Karswell, and that the assistant had previously told him that Dunning was the country's greatest authority on alchemy. Travelling home that evening, Dunning learns that his servants are both hospitalised with ptomaine poisoning, having purchased shellfish from a mysterious hawker. Returning from dinner to the empty house later that night, Dunning hears his study door open. Locking himself in his bedroom, he finds that the electric light is not working. Reaching under his pillow for his watch, he encounters "a mouth, with teeth, and with hair about it [...] not the mouth of a human being". He flees to a spare room; the next day, there is no sign of anything in his bedroom, but the wardrobe door is standing open.

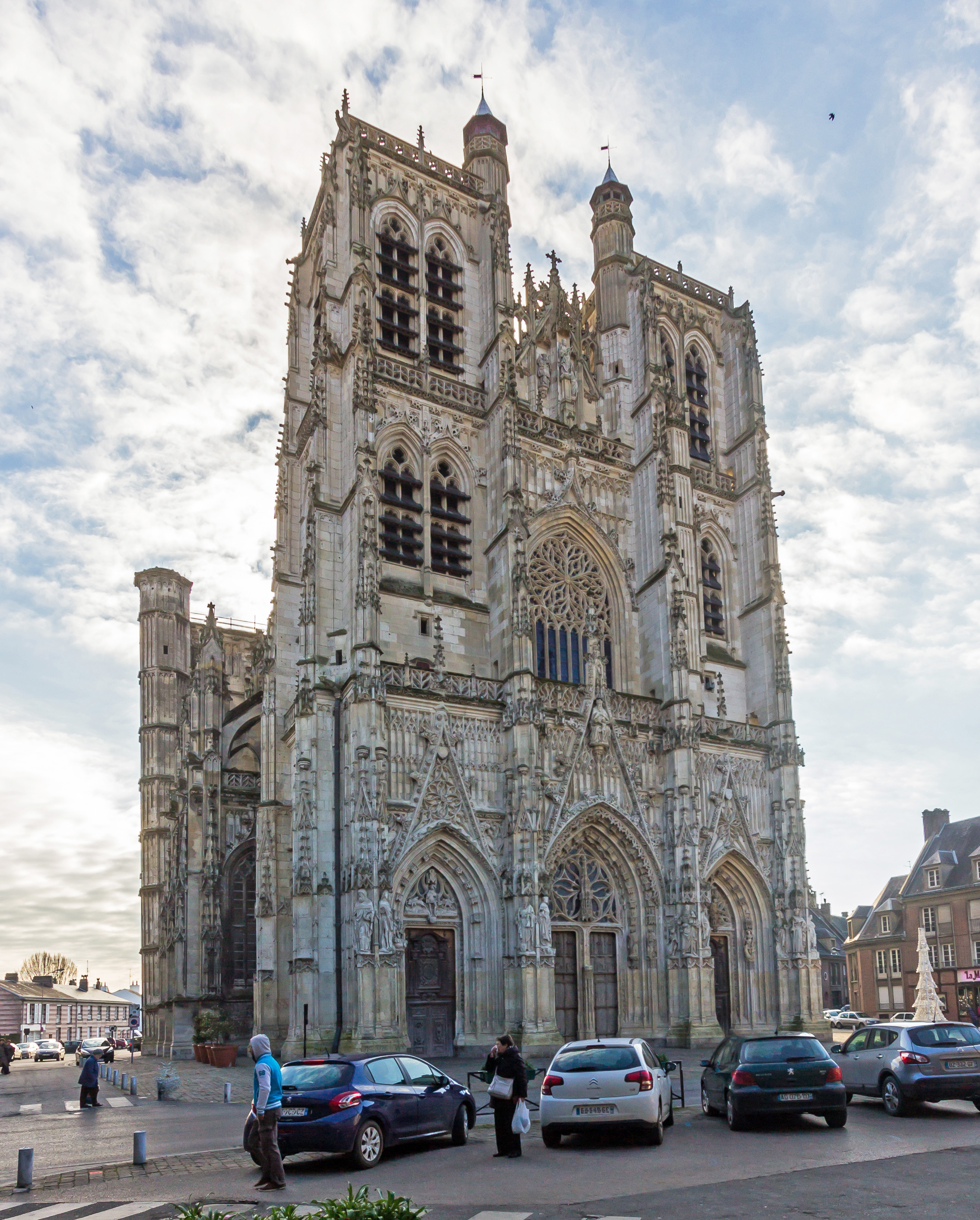
The Collegiate Church of Saint-Vulfran in Abbeville, where the story's antagonist meets his justice

Visiting his club, the unnerved Dunning meets Gayton, who invites him to stay with them. Discussing the matter, they deduce that Karswell has learned that Dunning led to his paper being rejected. Gayton introduces Dunning to Henry Harrington, who tells Dunning that in the weeks before his death, John Harrington had expressed a notion that he was being followed. Dunning and Harrington conclude that Karswell brought about the death of John Harrington and is attempting to do the same to Dunning. Three months before his death, John Harrington had been handed a concert programme by a man matching Karswell's description; examining it later, he found that it contained a strip of paper bearing with runic writing. Harrington recalls a chapter from Karswell's book History of Witchcraft which described a means of eliminating people known as "casting the Runes". Examining the quire that Karswell handed Dunning, the two men find that it also contains a strip of paper with indecipherable runic writing. They determine that the only way to prevent Dunning's death is to return the strip of paper to Karswell before 23 July.

In July, Harrington sends a telegram to Dunning saying that Karswell is to take a train from London Victoria station to Dover that evening. Dunning boards the train in Croydon and enters Karswell's carriage. After Karswell drops his ticket case, Dunning inserts the strip of paper in it and hands it to Karswell, saying: "May I give you this, sir? I believe it is yours." Karswell responds: "Yes, it is; much obliged to you, sir". Subsequently, the carriage appears to grow darker and warmer, and Karswell appears anxious. Exiting the train at Dover, Dunning and Harrington watch Karswell board a ship to Abbeville; the ticket examiner remarks: "Funny thing: I could 'a' swore 'e wasn't alone." Dunning and Harrington telegram hotels in Abbeville warning Karswell to examine his ticket case, but to no avail; on 23 July, Karswell is struck by a stone that mysteriously falls from scaffolding around the tower of the Collegiate Church of Saint-Vulfran and instantly killed.

== Publication ==
"Casting the Runes" was first published in More Ghost Stories of an Antiquary in 1911. In 1931, it was collected in James' book The Collected Ghost Stories of M. R. James. It has since been anthologised many times, including in The Weird in 2011. The original manuscript is held in the British Library.

== Adaptations ==
The 1957 film Night of the Demon (directed by Jacques Tourneur) is an adaption of this story. In this version, the central character is called Dr John Holden (played by Dana Andrews). Holden is an American psychologist who arrives in Britain around the same time that a person who planned to expose occultist Julian Karswell (Niall MacGinnis) as a charlatan only to meet their death. Holden comes to discover that Karswell's powers are real and that he has put a curse on Holden.

The story has been adapted twice for British television. The first was in 1968 as an episode of the anthology series Mystery and Imagination (season 3, episode 1, 1968) with John Fraser as Dunning and Robert Eddison as Karswell. In 1979, the story was adapted again as Casting the Runes, an episode of ITV Playhouse (season 11, episode 9). In the 1979 version, the central protagonist is a woman, Prudence Dunning (played by Jan Francis), the producer of an investigative television programme which is critical of an occultist named Karswell (played by Iain Cuthbertson), and soon finds that Karswell has a curse put upon her. No complete copies of the 1968 version are known to exist, but the 1979 version has been released on DVD.

"Casting the Runes" has also been adapted several times for radio. The first was in 1947 by CBS for their radio series Escape. On 21 April 1951, Saturday Matinee presented a version of "Casting the Runes" for the BBC Home Service with Roger Delgado as Harrington. CBS produced a second version of "Casting the Runes", titled "This Will Kill You", on 4 March 1974 for their CBS Radio Mystery Theater show. In 1981, BBC Radio 4 produced a loose adaptation called "The Hex" written by Gregory Evans. In December 2000, a dramatisation of "Casting the Runes" by Robin Brooks aired on BBC Radio 4's programme The Red Room; directed by Clive Brill, it starred Sean Baker as Dunning. In December 2018, BBC Radio 4's 15 Minute Drama aired a series entitled The Haunting of M. R. James featuring an adaptation of "Casting the Runes" written by Neil Brand and directed by David Hunter; it starred Mark Gatiss as M. R. James, John Bowler as Dunning; and Ewan Bailey as Karswell.
