= The Penguin Encyclopedia of Horror and the Supernatural =

1986 reference work on horror fiction and film

- Author: Jack Sullivan (editor)
- Language: English
- Subject: Literature; Horror fiction
- Genre: Reference Encyclopedia
- Publisher: Viking Press
- Publication date: 1986
- Publication place: United States
- Media type: Hardback Volume
- Pages: 482
- ISBN: 0-670-80902-0
- OCLC: 13124397
- Dewey Decimal: 700 19
- LC Class: BF1407 .P46 1986

The Penguin Encyclopedia of Horror and the Supernatural is a reference work on horror fiction in the arts, edited by Jack Sullivan. The book was published in 1986 by Viking Press.

Editor Sullivan’s stated purpose in compiling the volume, as noted in his foreword to the book, was to serve as a “bringing together in one volume of the genre’s many practitioners and their contributions to the arts.” In addition to literature and the art of storytelling, the book includes many entries on film, music, illustration, architecture, radio, and television. The book contains over fifty major essays and six hundred shorter entries covering authors, composers, film directors, and actors, among other categories.

The book provides about 650 entries written by 65 contributors including Ramsey Campbell, Gary William Crawford, John Crowley, Thomas M. Disch, Ron Goulart, S. T. Joshi, T. E. D. Klein, Kim Newman, Darrell Schweitzer, Whitley Strieber, Timothy Sullivan, Colin Wilson, and Douglas E. Winter. Jacques Barzun provided the lengthy introduction, "The Art and Appeal of the Ghostly and Ghastly".

In order to provide as broad as possible a study of fear, terror, and horror throughout the centuries, the book features numerous entries on "mainstream" artists who Sullivan notes "have dabbled in or plunged into horror", such as Charles Baudelaire, Thomas Hardy, Henry James, Franz Kafka, Edith Wharton, Sergei Prokofiev, Charles Dickens, Heinrich von Kleist, Herman Melville, Joyce Carol Oates, Franz Liszt, Arnold Schoenberg, William Butler Yeats, and Isaac Bashevis Singer, among others.

Hundreds of genre author entries are provided, including "William Beckford" by E. F. Bleiler, "Ambrose Bierce" and "Algernon Blackwood" by Jack Sullivan, "Ramsey Campbell" by Robert Hadji, "Robert W. Chambers" by T. E. D. Klein, "James Herbert" by Ramsey Campbell, "Shirley Jackson" by Sullivan, "Stephen King" by Don Herron, "Arthur Machen" by Klein, "Ann Radcliffe" by Devendra P. Varma, and "Peter Straub" by Patricia Skarda.

Theme essays include "Arkham House" by T. E. D. Klein, "The Continental Tradition" by Helen Searing, "English Romantic Poets" by John Calhoun, "Golden Age of the Ghost Story" by Jack Sullivan, "Illustration" by Robert Weinberg, "Opera" by Arthur Paxton, "The Pits of Terror" by Ramsey Campbell, "The Pulps" by Ron Goulart, "Shakespeare's Ghosts" by John Crowley, "Urban and Pastoral Horror" by Douglas E. Winter, and "Zombies" by Hugh Lamb.

Film and television related entries include "The Abominable Dr. Phibes", "Tod Browning", "Brian De Palma", "Eraserhead", "Inferno", "Boris Karloff", "Night of the Living Dead", "Roman Polanski", "Suspiria", "Salò, or the 120 Days of Sodom", and "The Wolf Man".

The book was reprinted in 1989 by Random House.

== Reception ==
In a comment to Hugh Lamb's review, Rosemary Pardoe noted, "I have to say that I think Hugh has been remarkably kind to a book which, for me, is a fine idea totally ruined by being put together by a packaging company who seem to know nothing about the subject. There are so many errors that no fact given in the book can be trusted without double-checking elsewhere."

"The encyclopedia has been criticized for lack of editorial balance, but deficiencies are offset by excellent critical essays by E. F. Bleiler, Richard Dalby and others."
