= Playhouse (British TV series) =

British TV series (1967–1983)

Playhouse, also known as ITV Playhouse, is a British television anthology series that ran from 1967 to 1983, which featured contributions from playwrights such as Dennis Potter, Rhys Adrian and Alan Sharp. The series began in black and white, but was later shot in colour and was produced by various companies for the ITV network, a format that would inspire Dramarama. The series would mostly include original material from writers, but adaptations of existing works were also produced (such as the 1979 production of M.R. James' horror story Casting the Runes).

== Actors ==
Actors appearing in the series included: Leslie Anderson, Gwen Nelson, Ricky Alleyne, Pat Heywood, Michael Elphick, Ian Hendry, Edward Woodward, Margaret Lockwood, Jessie Matthews, Basdeo Panday, Lloyd Peters, Anna Massey, Peter Sallis, Kim Fortune, Wanda Ventham, Gillian Martell, Glory Annen, Christine Shaw and Christopher Driscoll.

== Selected episodes ==
- Entertaining Mr. Sloane (1968)
- Premiere: The Night of Talavera (1968)
- Murder: Nobody Knows (1969)
- Thursday’s Child (1970)
- The High Game (1970)
- A Splinter of Ice (1972)
- I'm a Dreamer Montreal (1975)
- The Bass Player and the Blonde (1977)
- Casting the Runes (1979)
- A Rod of Iron (1980)
- Dogfood Dan and the Carmarthen Cowboy (1982)

== Archive Status ==
Out of an original total of 256 episodes, 33 episodes are currently missing.
