= Peter Elliott =

Peter Elliott may refer to:

- Peter Elliott (New Zealand actor) (born 1956 or 1957), New Zealand actor
- Pete Elliott (Peter R. Elliott, 1926–2013), American football coach
- Peter Elliott (runner) (born 1962), English middle-distance runner
- Peter Elliott (bishop) (1943–2025), Australian Roman Catholic auxiliary bishop of Melbourne
- Peter Elliott (British actor) (born 1956), actor specializing in ape roles
- Peter Elliott (Canadian priest) (born 1954), Anglican dean of New Westminster
- Peter Elliott (English priest) (born 1941), Anglican archdeacon of Northumberland
- Peter Elliott (pharmacologist) (born 1958), British pharmacologist
- Peter D. T. A. Elliott (born 1941), American mathematician
- Peter J. Elliott (1930–2016), British actor, stunt performer, singer, and diver

== See also ==
- Peter Elliot (born 1969), American writer
- Peter Eliot (1910–1995), English Anglican archdeacon of Worcester
