= More Ghost Stories of an Antiquary =

Second book of horror stories by M. R. James

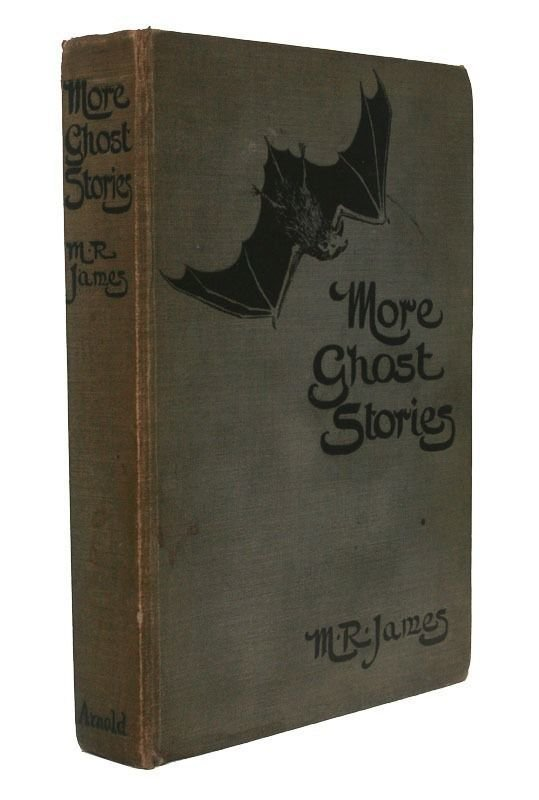
- Author: M. R. James
- Language: English
- Genre: Horror
- Publisher: Edward Arnold
- Publication date: 1911
- Publication place: UK
- Media type: Print (hardback)
- Preceded by: Ghost Stories of an Antiquary
- Followed by: A Thin Ghost and Others

More Ghost Stories of an Antiquary is a horror short story collection by British writer M. R. James, published in 1911. Some later editions include the stories in this collection and the earlier Ghost Stories of an Antiquary (1904), combined in a single volume. This is his second short story collection.

== Contents of the original edition ==
- "A School Story"
- "The Rose Garden"
- "The Tractate Middoth"
- "Casting the Runes"
- "The Stalls of Barchester Cathedral"
- "Martin's Close"
- "Mr. Humphreys and His Inheritance"
