= Jack Sullivan (literary scholar) =

American essayist, editor, musicologist, and concert annotator

Jack Sullivan (born November 26, 1946) is an American literary scholar, professor, essayist, author, editor, musicologist, concert annotator, and short story writer. He is a scholar of the horror genre, Alfred Hitchcock, and the impact of American culture on European music.

== Biography ==
Born November 26, 1946, Jack Sullivan obtained a B.A. from Furman University, and his M.A., M. Phil., and Ph.D., from Columbia University, where he studied under Jacques Barzun. A former English professor at NYU and Columbia, Sullivan is currently serving as the Chair of the English Department at Rider University, in Lawerenceville, New Jersey.

His literary and music essays and reviews have appeared in The New York Times Book Review, The Washington Post Book World, The New Republic, Saturday Review, USA Today, and Harper's Magazine. His short fiction was published in The Kelsey Review and New Terrors (edited by Ramsey Campbell).

He and his wife, Robin, have two sons, David (1995) and Geoffrey (1994).

== Works ==
- Elegant Nightmares: The English Ghost Story From Le Fanu To Blackwood, Ohio University Press, 1978. ISBN 0-8214-0569-1 examines the works of several recognized masters of the ghostly tale, including E. F. Benson, H. Russell Wakefield, Oliver Onions, and Walter de la Mare; separate chapters are devoted to full, in-depth studies of Sheridan Le Fanu, M. R. James, and Algernon Blackwood.
- Lost Souls: A Collection of English Ghost Stories, Ohio University Press, 1983. ISBN 0-8214-0653-1 is a collection of English ghost stories with stories from practitioners of supernatural fiction, such as L.P. Hartley, Arthur Machen, Robert Aickman, and Ramsey Campbell.
- The Penguin Encyclopedia of Horror and the Supernatural, Viking, 1986. ISBN 0-670-80902-0 (editor); Reprinted in 1989 by Random House Value Publishing, ISBN 0-517-61852-4 contains hundreds of entries and literary essays are provided on a variety of subjects, topics and writers, contributed by such genre luminaries as Ramsey Campbell, Kim Newman, T. E. D. Klein, John Crowley, Colin Wilson, Thomas M. Disch, Ron Goulart, Whitley Strieber, Jacques Barzun and many others. It was immediately recognized as one of the definitive reference works on the subject.
- Words on Music, Ohio University Press, 1990. ISBN 0-8214-0959-X a collection of essays on music chosen for their literary quality and appeal to a large audience, including George Bernard Shaw on Beethoven, George Eliot on Richard Wagner, G. K. Chesterton on Gilbert and Sullivan, and Jacques Barzun on opera.
- New World Symphonies: How American Culture Changed European Music, Yale University Press, 1999. ISBN 0-300-07231-7 analyzes the influence of American literature, music, and mythology on European music. It covers the impact of spirituals, jazz, Broadway, Hollywood, American landscape, and authors such as Poe and Whitman.
- Hitchcock's Music, Yale University Press, 2006. ISBN 0-300-11050-2 discusses the importance of music in Hitchcock's films, detailing his collaborations with composers such as Franz Waxman, Bernard Herrmann and John Williams, and singers such as Marlene Dietrich and Doris Day. It was cited by The Observer as best film book of the year and won the "2007 ASCAP Deems Taylor Award".
- New Orleans Remix, University Press of Mississippi, 2017, examines a vibrant musical renaissance that has been rocking the Big Easy since the early 1990s and shows how the city has held fiercely to the old even as it invents the new, a secret of its dynamic success. Based on dozens of interview and archives, the book shines the light on superb artists little known to the general public — Aurora Nealand, Shamarr Allen, Tom McDermott, Kermit Ruffins — as well as artists who have broken into the national spotlight such as the Rebirth Brass Band and Jon Batiste. Covering genres ranging from opera and jazz to brass band and funk, it was awarded a Certificate of Merit by the Association of Recorded Sound Collections.

Sullivan's 2013 script for "New York Philharmonic's Hitchcock!", a presentation of Hitchcock's film music at Lincoln Center, was narrated by Alec Baldwin and Sam Waterston.
