= Edward Arnold (publisher) =

British publisher

- Status: Defunct
- Founded: 1890
- Founder: Edward Augustus Arnold
- Successor: SAGE Publications, Bloomsbury Academic, Taylor & Francis
- Country of origin: United Kingdom
- Headquarters location: London
- Publication types: Books, journals
- Nonfiction topics: Medicine and nursing

Edward Arnold Publishers Ltd is a British publishing house with its head office in London. The firm had published books for over 100 years. It was acquired by Hodder & Stoughton in 1987 and became part of the Hodder Education group in 2001. In 2006, Hodder Arnold sold its academic journals to SAGE Publications. In 2009, Hodder Education sold its higher education lists in Media and Communications, History and English Literature, including many Arnold titles, to Bloomsbury Academic. In 2012, Hodder Education sold its medical and higher education lines, including the remainder of Arnold, to Taylor & Francis. Edward Arnold published books and journals for students, academics and professionals.

== Founder ==
Edward Augustus Arnold was born in Truro on 15 July 1857. His grandfather was Thomas Arnold and his uncle Matthew Arnold. He was educated at Eton and Hertford College, Oxford.

From 1883 he worked as a magazine editor for the firm of Richard Bentley and from 1887 edited Murray's Magazine for the John Murray publishing house.

He set up his own publishing business in London's Covent Garden in January 1890. Trading under his own name and later as Edward Arnold & Co., he specialized in educational books, exploration, mountaineering, Egyptology, and medical and scientific texts. He published most of E. M. Forster's major works.

He died at Budleigh Salterton on 6 November 1942.

== Book series ==
- Arnold's English Literature Series
- Kingfisher Library
- Stratford-Upon-Avon Series
- Studies in Australian Literature
- Studies in English Literature
- Studies in French Literature
- Studies in German Literature
- York Medieval Texts

== Bibliography ==
- Bryan Bennett and Anthony Hamilton, Edward Arnold: 100 Years of Publishing, London: Edward Arnold [Hodder & Stoughton], 1990. ISBN 0 340 54109 1. Illustrated with black and white plates and recounts the publishing company of Edward Arnold & Co. in the years 1890–1990.
- Bennett, Bryan; Hamilton, Anthony (1991). "Edward Arnold; Edward Arnold and Company; Edward Arnold (Publishers) Limited; Edward Arnold, a Division of Hodder and Stoughton Limited". In Jonathan Rose; Patricia Anderson (eds.). British Literary Publishing Houses, 1881-1965. Detroit, MI: Gale.
