= The Treasure of Abbot Thomas (film) =

1974 British television ghost story

- Title screen
- Based on: "The Treasure of Abbot Thomas" by M. R. James
- Written by: John Bowen
- Directed by: Lawrence Gordon Clark
- Starring: Michael Bryant as Rev. Justin Somerton; Paul Lavers as Peter, Lord Dattering; Frank Mills as Mr. Tyson; Sheila Dunn as Mrs. Tyson; John Herrington as Abbot Thomas; Virginia Balfour as Lady Dattering; Peggy Aitchison as Landlady

Production
- Producer: Rosemary Hill
- Running time: 36 minutes

Original release
- Release: 23 December 1974

Related
- A Ghost Story for Christmas

The Treasure of Abbot Thomas is a short film which serves as the fourth episode of the British supernatural anthology television series A Ghost Story for Christmas. Written by John Bowen, produced by Rosemary Hill, and directed by the series' creator, Lawrence Gordon Clark, it is based on the ghost story of the same name by M. R. James, first published in the collection Ghost Stories of an Antiquary (1904), and first aired on BBC1 on 23 December 1974.

It stars Michael Bryant as the academic Rev. Justin Somerton, who along with his protoge Peter, Lord Dattering (Paul Lavers) seeks to uncover the supposed resting place of a cache of gold which once belonged to Abbot Thomas (John Herrington), a disgraced 15th century alchemist. It is the first entry in the series to feature original music, composed by Geoffrey Burgon.

== Synopsis ==
In 1859 the Rev Justin Somerton (Michael Bryant), an academic clergyman and Medievalist, and his aristocratic protégé Peter, Lord Dattering (Paul Lavers) expose two fraudulent mediums, Mr and Mrs Tyson, who claim they are able to communicate with the recently deceased husband of Lady Dattering (Virginia Balfour). Somerton tells Dattering about his researches into the history of an ancient local monastery. He tells of a supposed cache of gold said to have been hidden by one Abbot Thomas, a disgraced former churchman and alchemist who, according to legend, was carried off by the Devil in 1429. Together, they follow the clues during which they visit a church where they discover hidden messages in an old stained-glass window referring to the location of the treasure hidden long ago by the evil Abbot Thomas. Despite the warning that the Abbot had "set a guardian" to protect his treasure, Somerton sets out to unearth it - and discovers its horrific secret.

== Cast ==
- Michael Bryant as Rev. Justin Somerton
- Paul Lavers as Peter, Lord Dattering
- Frank Mills as Mr Tyson
- Sheila Dunn as Mrs Tyson
- John Herrington as Abbot Thomas
- Virginia Balfour as Lady Dattering
- Peggy Aitchison as Landlady

== Production ==
=== Adaptation ===
In creating his adaptation, Bowen changed a number of elements of M. R. James's story, such as removing Somerton's servant Brown from the story and adding another character – Peter, Lord Dattering (Paul Lavers) (Note: Listed as such in the film credits and addressed as "Lord Dattering" in the film; he is incorrectly listed as "Lord Peter Dattering" on IMDb, which would be a courtesy title borne by a younger son, who would be addressed as "Lord Peter") – as Somerton's protégé, with whom he shares his investigation. Unlike James's original story, the television version is not told in flashback, and includes a scene in which Somerton exposes two fraudulent mediums, which acts as a demonstration of Somerton's rational approach to the supernatural.

For "The Treasure of Abbot Thomas", Clark recalls John Bowen's script "took some liberties with the story—which made it for the better I think...It's really quite a funny story until it gets nasty, although the threat is always there. James has a mordant sense of humour, and it's good to translate that into cinematic terms when you can. I'd always wanted to do a medium scene, and John came up with a beauty."

A parody, written by Stephen Sheridan and named The Teeth of Abbot Thomas, was made for radio broadcast and is currently available on YouTube.

=== Locations ===
Although James's original story was set in Germany, for budgetary reasons in the television version the action was relocated to England. Clark used the grounds of Wells Cathedral in Somerset for the entrance to the well where Abbot Thomas hid his treasure. Wells Cathedral Chapter House and its adjoining steps also were used in various scenes. The house featured is Orchardleigh, on the outskirts of Frome - also in Somerset. The 13th-century church of St Mary, Orchardleigh also featured in the production, as did Vicars' Close in Wells, Somerset.

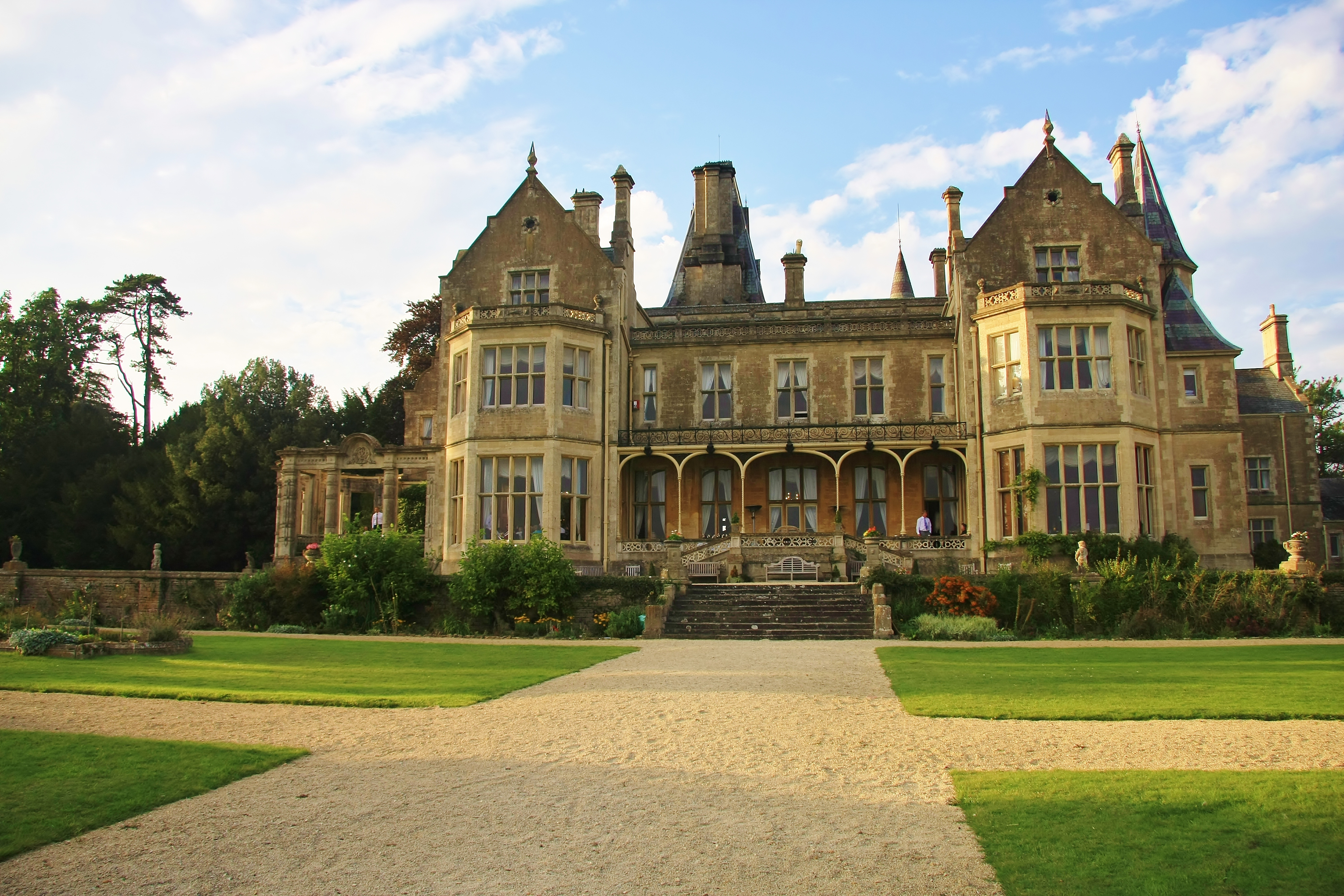
Orchardleigh features in the drama

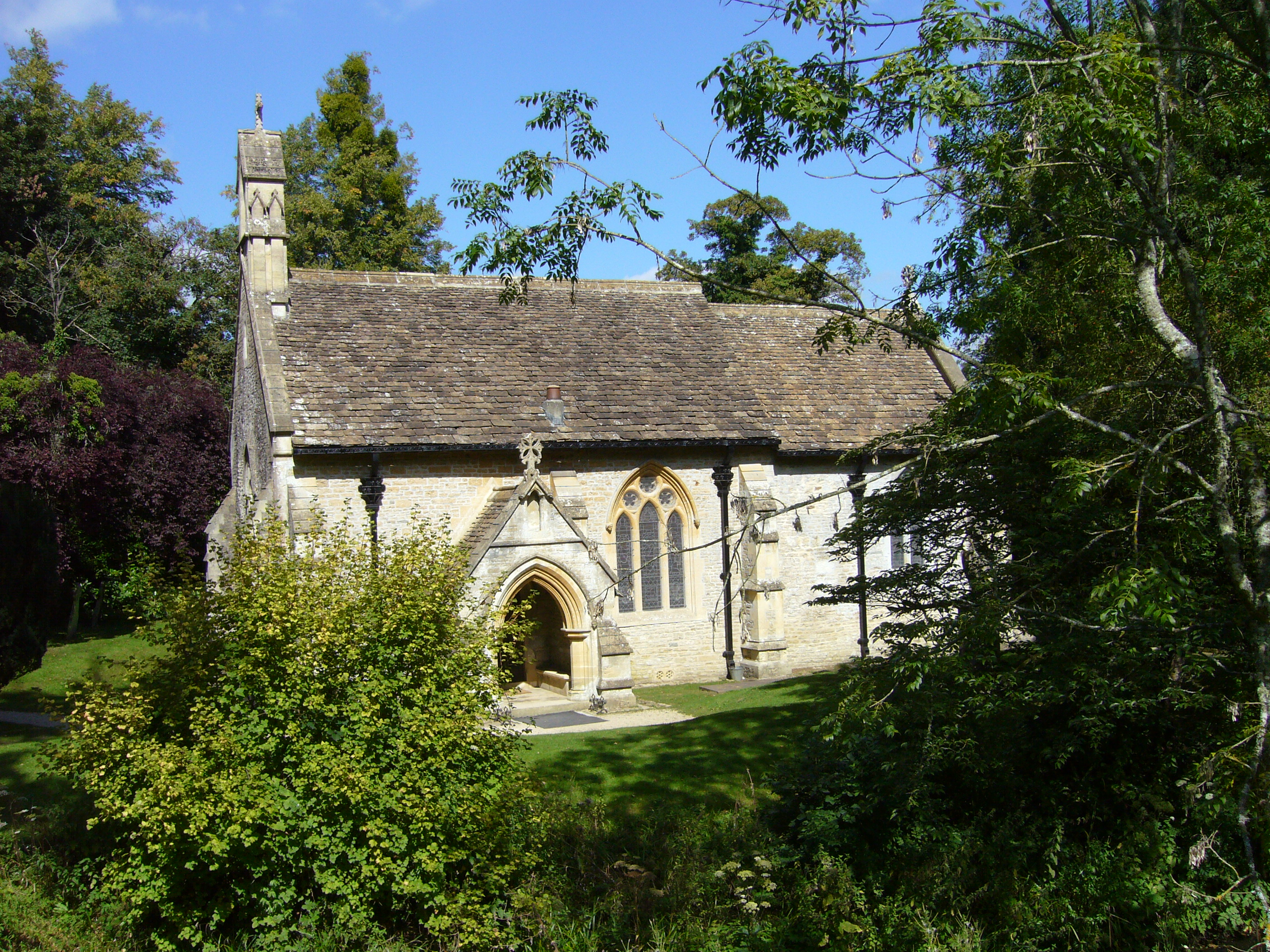
The 13th-century church of St Mary, Orchardleigh

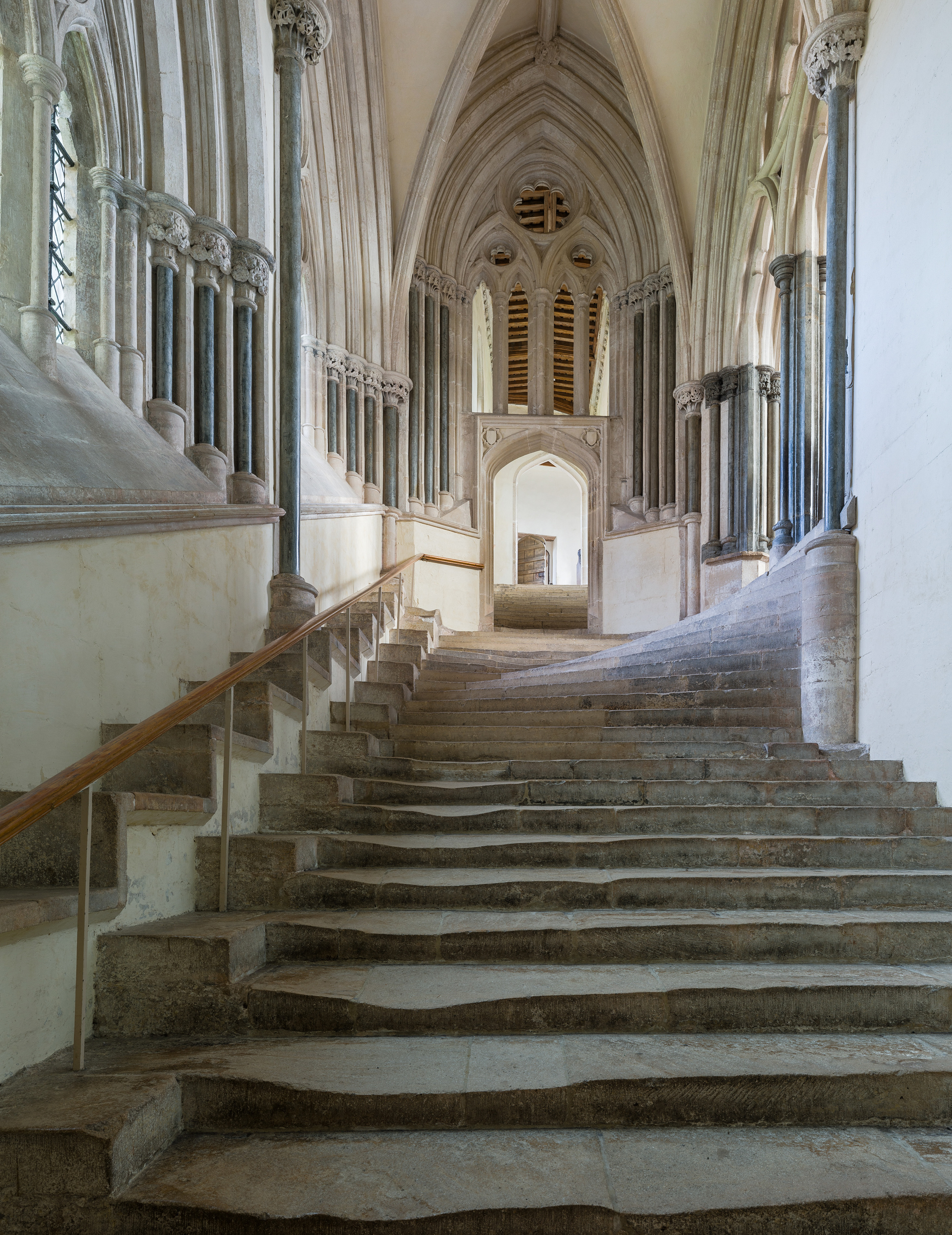
The steps to the Chapter House in Wells Cathedral

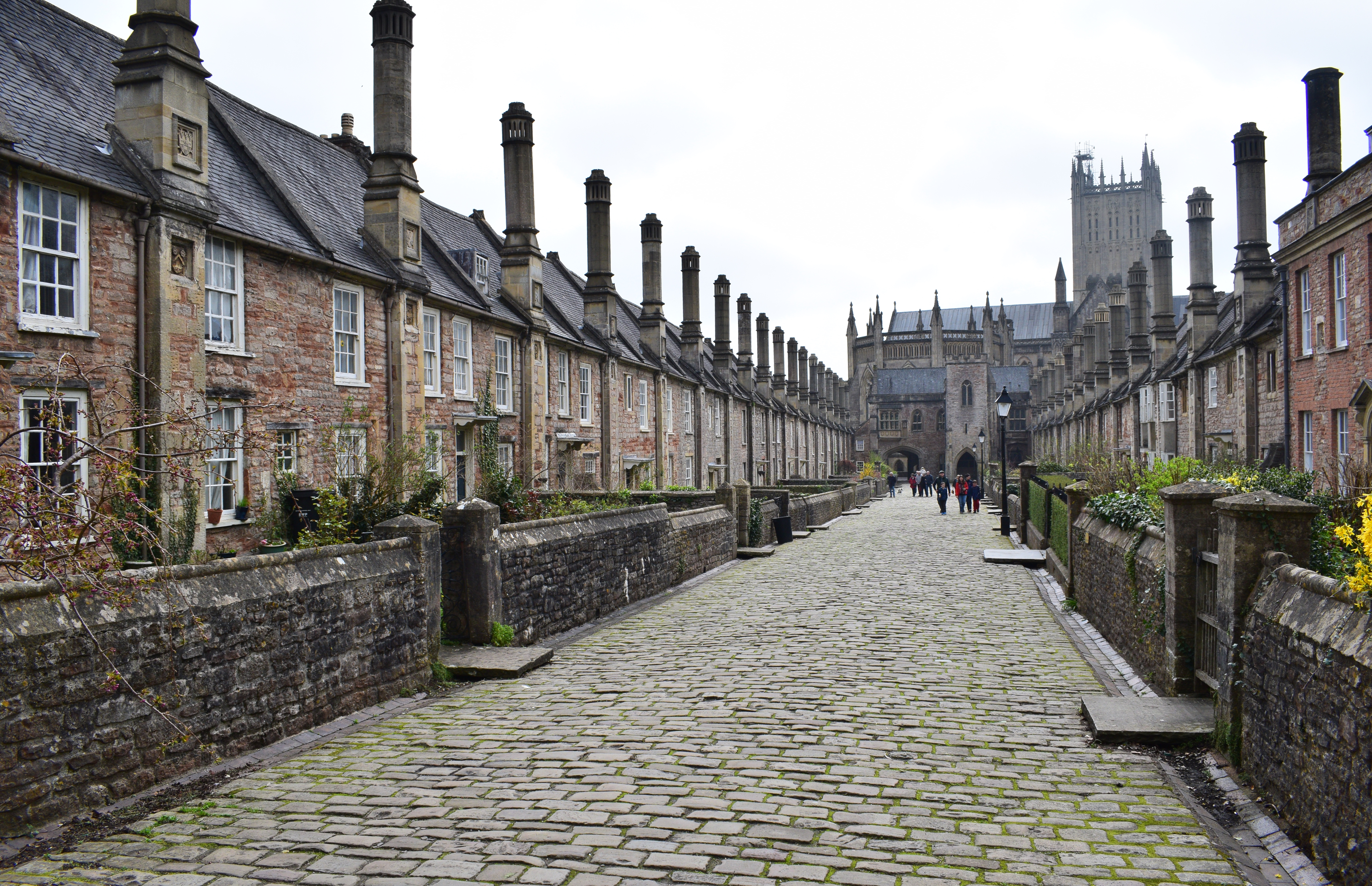
Vicars' Close in Wells also featured

== Home video ==
"The Treasure of Abbot Thomas" was first released on DVD in Australia in 2011 by Shock Entertainment as part of the box set The Complete Ghost Stories of M. R. James.

In 2012, to mark the 150th anniversary of James' birth, "The Treasure of Abbot Thomas" was released on DVD by the BFI alongside "Lost Hearts" (1973) and "The Ash Tree" (1975) in the same release, and the entire run of A Ghost Story for Christmas from 1971-2010 was released in a DVD box set, which was updated the following year to include additional material. All three releases featured an essay on "The Treasure of Abbot Thomas" by cinema curator Alex Davidson and a filmed introduction by Lawrence Gordon Clark.

In 2023 it was remastered in 2k resolution by the BFI and released on Blu-ray alongside "The Ash Tree", "The Signalman" (1976), "Stigma" (1977), "The Ice House" (1978), "A View from a Hill" (2005), and "Number 13" (2006) as Ghost Stories for Christmas - Volume 2. This included Alex Davidson's essay, the Lawrence Gordon Clark introduction, and a newly-recorded commentary by writer Simon Farquhar.
