= The Ash Tree (film) =

1975 British television ghost story

- Title screen
- Based on: "The Ash-tree" by M. R. James
- Written by: David Rudkin
- Directed by: Lawrence Gordon Clark
- Starring: Edward Petherbridge as Sir Richard/Sir Matthew; Barbara Ewing as Ann Mothersole; Preston Lockwood as Dr. Croome; Lalla Ward as Lady Augusta; Lucy Griffiths as Mrs Chiddock; Oliver Maguire as William Beresford; Clifford Kershaw as The Witchfinder; Cyril Appleton as Master Procathro

Production
- Producer: Rosemary Hill
- Running time: 31 minutes

Original release
- Release: 23 December 1975

Related
- A Ghost Story for Christmas

The Ash Tree is a short film which is part of the British supernatural anthology series A Ghost Story for Christmas. Written by David Rudkin, produced by Rosemary Hill, and directed by the series' creator, Lawrence Gordon Clark, it is based on the ghost story "The Ash-tree" by M. R. James, first published in the collection Ghost Stories of an Antiquary (1904), and first aired on BBC1 on 23 December 1975.

It stars Edward Petherbridge in the dual role of Sir Richard, an 18th-century aristocrat who inherits the estate of his late uncle, and of Sir Matthew, his 17th century ancestor whose role in the witch trial of Ann Mothersole (Barbara Ewing) haunts Sir Richard via nighttime visions. Sir Richard is also disturbed by strange noises coming from an ash tree outside his bedroom window, which is revealed to have a connection with these events.

Since airing it has received a mixed response from critics in comparison with the other James adaptations produced in the series' original run, with even Clark regarding it as a disappointment. It was the last James adaptation produced as part of the series' original run, and the last one to air until A View from a Hill (2005).

== Synopsis ==
In 1735 the aristocrat Sir Richard (Edward Petherbridge) inherits his family estate, Castringham Hall in Suffolk, from his recently deceased childless uncle, who in turn had inherited it from his own childless uncle, Sir Matthew (Petherbridge in a dual role). The new owner is determined not to follow the path of his relatives by marrying his fiancée, Lady Augusta (Lalla Ward), and producing heirs. However, Sir Richard is disturbed by the strange infantile noises coming from an ash tree (Fraxinus excelsior) outside his bedroom window and he is haunted by visions of his relative's role in a witchcraft trial of 1690.

== Cast ==
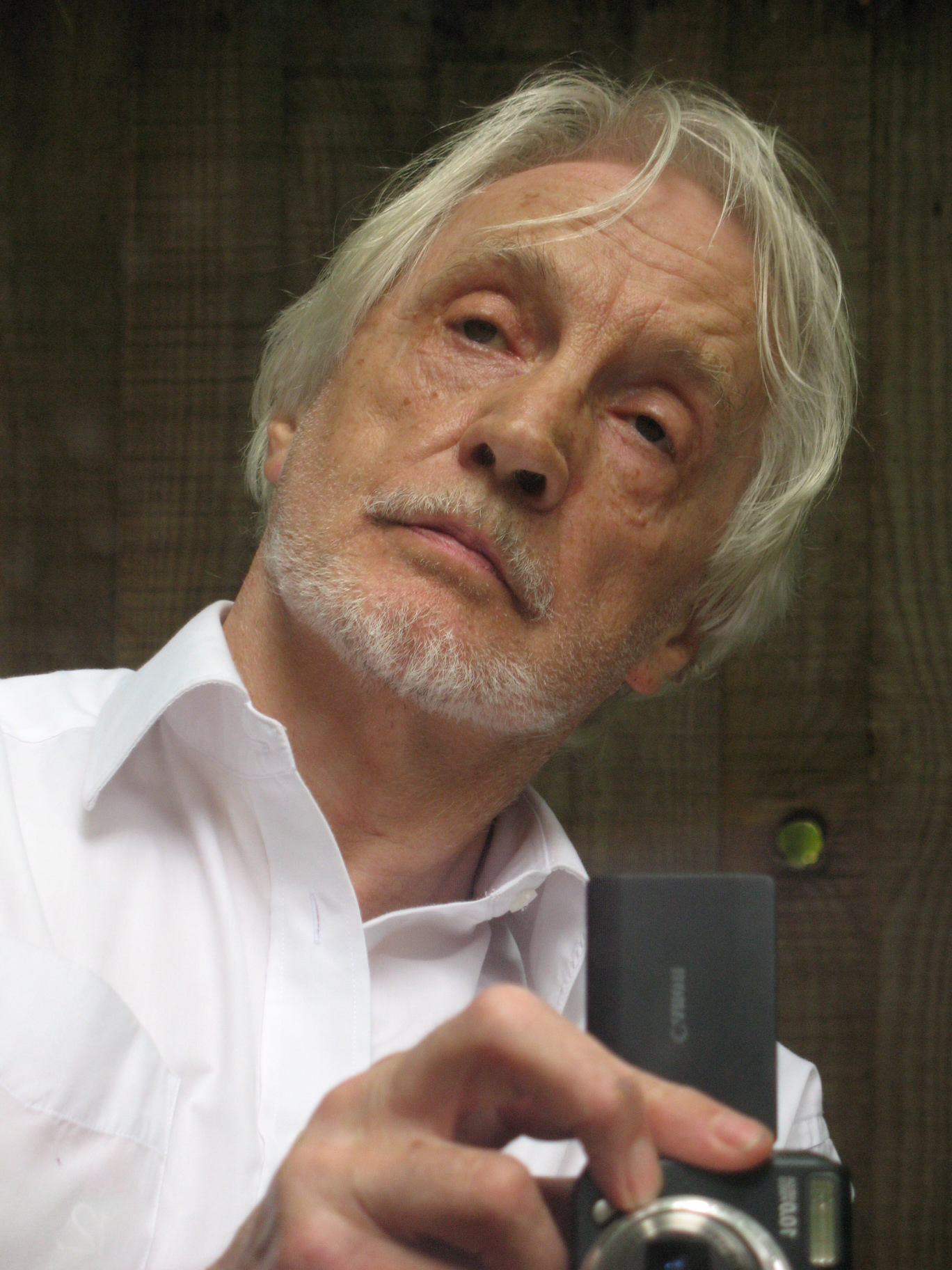
Edward Petherbridge (seen here in a self-portrait of 2007) played Sir Richard and Sir Matthew in the drama

- Edward Petherbridge as Sir Richard/Sir Matthew
- Barbara Ewing as Anne Mothersole
- Preston Lockwood as Dr Croome
- Lalla Ward as Lady Augusta
- Lucy Griffiths as Mrs Chiddock
- Oliver Maguire as William Beresford
- Clifford Kershaw as The Witchfinder
- Cyril Appleton as Master Procathro

== Production ==
Clark is less than complimentary of his adaptation of "The Ash Tree", which he felt didn't make Mistress Mothersole an effective villain, as a result of both his and adaptor David Rudkin's sympathy for witch trial victims; "We know so much about the hysteria of the witch trials and the ignorance and downright evil that fueled them that it was well-nigh impossible to portray her as James intended. Although, even he makes her a complicated character, hinting that she was popular with local farmers and the pagan fertility aspects that this implies. Frankly, I don't think the script quite did justice to the story, and maybe someone else should have a go at it."

Clark gave his writers a lot of leeway in their interpretation of James's original stories, and Rudkin's "television version" changes the well-off Mistress Mothersole (Barbara Ewing), who has property of her own, into a younger and more attractive woman, hinting at a sexual attraction between her and Sir Matthew that would have been unthinkable in James's original 1904 story. Rudkin also changed the relationship between Sir Richard inheriting Castringham Hall from his father and grandfather to his childless uncle and great-uncle in order to be able to introduce the character of Lady Augusta (Lalla Ward in a pre-Doctor Who role).

=== Locations ===
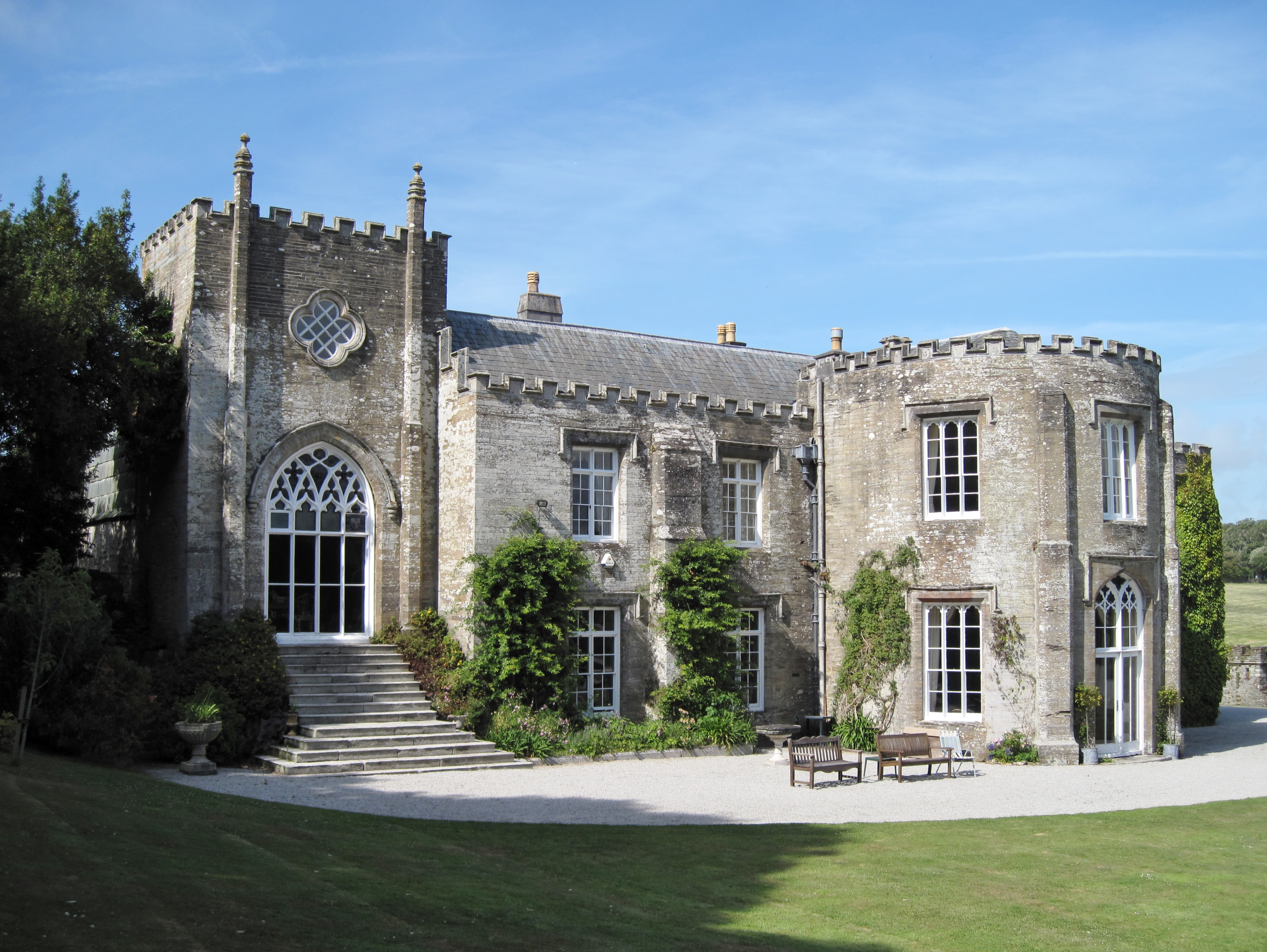
Prideaux Place near Padstow featured as Castringham Hall

Clark relocates the Suffolk scenes of James's original story to Cornwall, with Prideaux Place near Padstow featuring as Castringham Hall. The scene of the hanging of the witches was filmed at the Cheesewring on Bodmin Moor in Cornwall.

== Home video ==
"The Ash Tree" was first released on DVD in Australia in 2011 by Shock Entertainment as part of the box set The Complete Ghost Stories of M. R. James.

In 2012, to mark the 150th anniversary of James' birth, "The Ash Tree" was released on DVD by the BFI alongside "Lost Hearts" (1973) and "The Treasure of Abbot Thomas" (1974) in the same release, and the entire run of A Ghost Story for Christmas from 1971-2010 was released in a DVD box set, which was updated the following year to include additional material. All three releases featured an essay on "The Ash Tree" by television consultant Dick Fiddy and a filmed introduction by Lawrence Gordon Clark. Peter Bell notes that the premiere of the DVD at the BFI drew laughter from attendees due to the "rather unconvincing spiders".

In 2023 it was remastered in 2k resolution by the BFI and released on Blu-ray alongside "The Treasure of Abbot Thomas", "The Signalman" (1976), "Stigma" (1977), "The Ice House"' (1978), "A View from a Hill" (2005), and "Number 13" (2006) as Ghost Stories for Christmas - Volume 2. This included Dick Fiddy's essay, the Lawrence Gordon Clark introduction, and a newly recorded commentary by TV historian Jon Dear.
