= The Ice House (1978 film) =

1978 British television ghost story

- Written by: John Bowen
- Directed by: Derek Lister
- Starring: John Stride; Elizabeth Romilly; Geoffrey Burridge; David Beames; Gladys Spencer; Eirene Beck; Sam Avent; Dennis Jennings; Ronald Mayer

Production
- Producer: Rosemary Hill
- Running time: 34 minutes

Original release
- Release: 25 December 1978

Related
- A Ghost Story for Christmas

The Ice House is a short film, part of the British supernatural anthology series A Ghost Story for Christmas, and the final instalment of the original 1971-78 run. Written by John Bowen, who wrote the earlier instalment The Treasure of Abbot Thomas (1974), produced by Rosemary Hill, and directed by Derek Lister, it first aired on BBC1 on 25 December 1978, only the second of the films to air on Christmas Day after Lost Hearts (1973).

It stars John Stride as Paul, who has moved to a residential health spa in an old country house following his divorce. A number of disappearances cause him to suspect a strange flower growing near an old ice house and the behaviour of Clovis (Geoffrey Burridge) and Jessica (Elizabeth Romilly), the siblings who run the spa.

Like the previous year's Stigma, The Ice House is an original, contemporary story in contrast with the period ghost story adaptations which had previously been a hallmark of the series. This was at the insistence of Hill, who had taken over as producer in 1973, and the ambivalence of series creator Lawrence Gordon Clark to this direction caused him to leave following Stigma, making The Ice House the only film in the original run not directed by him.

The film is not well regarded, being the last in the series' original run before its cancellation, and barely a ghost story at all. Alex Davison, writing an essay for the BFI's 2012 release of the ghost stories, states "Although "The Ice House" boasts some eerie scenes, it never quite recaptures the chills of Clark's set pieces" but notes it is "arguably the most daringly experimental film of the A Ghost Story for Christmas series". The series would not return until A View from a Hill (2005) and it is the last episode to be shown originally on BBC1, since the revival has aired alternately on BBC Two and BBC Four.

== Cast ==
- John Stride as Paul
- Elizabeth Romilly as Jessica
- Geoffrey Burridge as Clovis
- David Beames as Bob
- Gladys Spencer as Diamond Lady
- Eirene Beck as Rosetti Lady
- Sam Avent as Gentleman Guest
- Dennis Jennings as Gentleman Guest
- Ronald Mayer as Gentleman Guest

== Home video ==
In 2012, to mark the 150th anniversary of the birth of M. R. James, The Ice House was released on DVD by the BFI alongside The Signalman (1976) and Stigma (1977) in the same release, and the entire run of A Ghost Story for Christmas from 1971-2010 was released in a DVD box set, which was updated the following year to include additional material. All three releases featured an essay on "The Ice House" by cinema curator Alex Davidson.

In 2023 it was remastered in 2k resolution by the BFI and released on Blu-ray alongside The Treasure of Abbot Thomas (1974), The Ash Tree (1975), The Signalman, Stigma, A View from a Hill (2005) and Number 13 (2006) as Ghost Stories for Christmas - Volume 2. This included Alex Davidson's essay and a newly recorded commentary by critics Kim Newman and Sean Hogan.
