= The Signalman (film) =

1976 British television ghost story

- Title screen, showing the cutting and the signal box.
- Based on: "The Signal-Man" by Charles Dickens
- Written by: Andrew Davies
- Directed by: Lawrence Gordon Clark
- Starring: Denholm Elliott as The Signalman; Bernard Lloyd as The Traveller; Reginald Jessup as The Engine Driver; Carina Wyeth as The Bride

Production
- Producer: Rosemary Hill
- Running time: 38 minutes

Original release
- Release: 22 December 1976

Related
- A Ghost Story for Christmas

The Signalman is a short film that is part of the British supernatural anthology series A Ghost Story for Christmas. Written by Andrew Davies, produced by Rosemary Hill, and directed by the series' creator, Lawrence Gordon Clark, it is based on the ghost story "The Signal-Man" (1866) by Charles Dickens, and first aired on BBC1 on 22 December 1976, the earliest airdate in the series relative to Christmas.

It stars Denholm Elliott as a lone signalman who is visited by a traveller (Bernard Lloyd). The signalman reveals that he is being haunted by a spectre which has appeared at the entrance of the tunnel next to his signal box, and these visions begin to likewise trouble the traveller in his sleep.

The Signalman is the first instalment in the series not to be based on a story by M. R. James, and the last of the original run to be based on a pre-existing work. For this reason it is the first in which the series' title appears on-screen before the episode title, despite having been used in the Radio Times listings since the series' inception. Producer Rosemary Hill hoped to move the series in a more contemporary direction as opposed to the period settings of the James stories, though "The Signal-Man" was a story both she and Clark enjoyed, and so was picked as a compromise.

Since airing it has received critical acclaim, being widely regarded as the best episode in the series and one of the greatest works of horror television ever made.

== Plot ==
A man (referred to as "The Traveller" in the cast list) observes the solitary figure of a signalman standing by the track in a railway cutting. Shielding his face from the sun with one arm, the Traveller waves and greets the Signalman. However, the Signalman seems fearful and makes no attempt to speak to the Traveller. Observing the man's demeanour, the Traveller notes that the Signalman appears to be afraid of him. Having been reassured that there is nothing to fear, the Signalman invites the Traveller into his lonely signal box. Seated in front of the fire, the two men talk about the Signalman's work. Although his labour consists of a dull, monotonous routine, the Signalman feels he deserves nothing better because he wasted his academic opportunities when he was young.

During their conversation, the Signalman is repeatedly distracted by an unusual, high-pitched vibration of his signal bell that only he can hear. The Traveller remarks on the bell, and the red light at the entrance to the nearby tunnel, before changing the subject to how an accident in the tunnel would be a terrible thing. The Signalman, slightly wide-eyed, tells him that a tunnel collision is the "worst to be feared". To comfort the disturbed man, the Traveller comments that he almost believes he has met a contented man at peace, because the Signalman does his duty no matter what and has no desire to be anywhere else.

The Traveller agrees to meet the Signalman the next night when he starts his shift. Holding his light so that the Traveller can find his way back up the path, the Signalman asks him not to call out. At the inn later that night, the Traveller hears the faint sounds of a passing train before retiring to bed, and in his sleep, dreams of the Signalman telling him not to call out and, even though he could not hear it at the time, of the bell making its vibrating ring, bathed in the red light of the signal at the tunnel entrance.

The next evening, as the fog settles in, the Traveller finds the Signalman waiting for him. The Signalman reveals the reason for his initial fear; the Traveller's waving action and words mimic those of a ghostly spectre which rings his bell and is visible beside the red tunnel light. The spectre has appeared twice: first before a tunnel disaster, and then before a young bride fell to her death from a passing train. The Signalman explains that the spectre had returned a week before and has appeared since in fits and starts, always by the light at the tunnel and always gesturing with one arm across its face and the other waved in warning. The frustrated Signalman says that he has no rest or peace because of it, and that it calls out to him with an agonised shout of, "Below There, Look Out, Look Out!", as well as waving and ringing the signal box bell.

The Signalman notes his dilemma; if he was to telegraph "danger" he would not be able to give any reason why and would surely be displaced or fired, so he feels powerless to prevent a possible calamity. The Traveller tries to reassure him by telling him that there is nothing the Signalman can do but discharge his duty, and he must remain calm. The Signalman thanks the Traveller for his advice and they agree to meet again.

After a troubled sleep, the Traveller goes to meet the Signalman the following morning, but as he nears the cutting a train approaches through the tunnel and the Traveller realises he can hear the bell ringing. Running towards the scene, he attempts to warn the Signalman, who is standing transfixed on the rail line beside the red light at the tunnel entrance. As the spectre reappears, the Signalman is struck by the oncoming train.

The Engine Driver tells the Traveller that, as his locomotive came around a bend, he saw the Signalman standing on the line. When the Signalman did not heed the whistle, the driver shut it off and called out to him. The Traveller asks what the driver said. Turning around and standing in front of the red light, the driver tells him that he called, "Hallo, Below There, Look Out", with one hand covering his face and the other waving in warning. The Traveller is horrified, because the actions of the Driver are the same as those of the spectre that haunted the Signalman. He watches the crew carry the Signalman's body away, before turning and heading back over the countryside in the thickening winter fog.

== Cast ==
- Denholm Elliott as The Signalman
- Bernard Lloyd as The Traveller
- Reginald Jessup as The Engine Driver
- Carina Wyeth as The Bride

== Production ==
=== Adaptation ===
The original short story may have been influenced by Dickens's own involvement with the Staplehurst rail crash in Kent on 9 June 1865. While passing over a viaduct, Dickens' train was derailed because some part of the track had been removed for maintenance. The cast iron viaduct fractured, causing most of the carriages to fall into the river below. Dickens was in the first carriage, which derailed sideways but did not fall completely. It was suspended at a precarious angle by the coupling of the coach in front and held up by the remains of the viaduct's masonry. Dickens helped rescue other passengers, and was commended for his actions, but the experience subsequently had a profound effect on his life.

In The Signalman, adaptor Andrew Davies adds scenes of the traveller's nightmare-plagued nights at an inn, and re-affirms the ambiguity of the traveller-narrator by restructuring the ending, and by matching his facial features with those of the spectre. The film also makes use of visual and aural devices. For example, the appearance of the spectre is stressed by the vibrations of a bell in the signalbox, and the recurring red motif connects the signalman's memories of a train crash with the danger light attended by the ghostly figure.

Davies also changes a number of elements for dramatic effect. For example, the bride is already dead when she falls out of the train and is merely referred to as "A Beautiful Young Lady". In the film, the traveller witnesses the signalman's demise, but in the short story, the narrator (the traveller's equivalent) comes the next day and encounters a railway inspector who informs him of the signalman's death.

The fashion and technology visible suggest that the film is set in the 1900s rather than the 1860s. At one point the Signal-Man whistles "Tit Willow", a song from the Gilbert and Sullivan operetta The Mikado (1885).

=== Filming ===
The film was produced exclusively on location on the Severn Valley Railway and, as such, the adaptation exists as a 16mm negative film reel, as opposed to the standard PAL videotape. A replica Great Western Railway signal box was erected in the cutting on the Kidderminster side of Bewdley Tunnel, and Highley signal box was used for the interior shots. The signalman's speech about the tunnel accident, and its subsequent depiction, is likely a reference to the Clayton Tunnel crash that occurred during 1861, five years before Dickens wrote his short story.

== Reception ==
"Denholm (Elliot) was so wonderful in that role, like a tightly coiled spring. There was such tension in the character: he was always only a step away from insanity."

— Lawrence Gordon Clark

The Signalman is among the most critically acclaimed of the Ghost Story for Christmas adaptations. Simon Farquhar suggests that the film is the first evidence of Andrew Davies' gift as an adaptor of literary fiction: "despite an extremely arduous shoot, Davies and Clarke's fog-wreathed, flame-crackling masterpiece manages something the production team could never have imagined: it's better than the book." Dave Rolinson notes that while "the adaptation inevitably misses Dickens' nuanced and often unsettling prose ... it achieves comparably skillful effects through visual language and sound, heightening theme and supernatural mood ... The production heightens the story's crucial features of repetition and foreshadowing."

== Home video ==
The BFI first released The Signalman on VHS and DVD alongside separate releases of Whistle and I'll Come to You (1968) and A Warning to the Curious (1972) in 2002 and 2003, respectively. It was included as an extra on the Region 1 American DVD release of the 1994 BBC production of Hard Times.

In 2012, to mark the 150th anniversary of M. R. James' birth, it was rereleased on DVD by the BFI, now alongside Stigma (1977) and The Ice House (1978) in the same release, and the entire run of A Ghost Story for Christmas from 1971-2010 was released in a DVD box set, which was updated the following year to include additional material. All three releases featured an essay on The Signalman by writer Simon Farquhar and a filmed introduction by Lawrence Gordon Clark.

In 2023, it was remastered in 2k resolution by the BFI and released on Blu-ray alongside The Treasure of Abbot Thomas (1974), The Ash Tree (1975), Stigma, The Ice House, A View from a Hill (2005), and Number 13 (2006) as Ghost Stories for Christmas - Volume 2. This included Simon Farquhar's essay, the Lawrence Gordon Clark introduction, and a newly-recorded commentary by television historian Jon Dear and writer and actor Mark Gatiss.
