= Stigma (1977 film) =

1977 British television ghost story

- Title screen
- Written by: Clive Exton
- Directed by: Lawrence Gordon Clark
- Starring: Kate Binchy as Katharine; Peter Bowles as Peter; Maxine Gordon as Verity; Jon Laurimore as Dr. Hall; Christopher Blake as Richard; John Judd as Dave

Production
- Producer: Rosemary Hill
- Running time: 31 minutes

Original release
- Release: 29 December 1977

Related
- A Ghost Story for Christmas

Stigma is a short film which is part of the British supernatural anthology series A Ghost Story for Christmas. Written by Clive Exton, produced by Rosemary Hill, and directed by the series' creator, Lawrence Gordon Clark, it first aired on BBC1 on 29 December 1977 (delayed from 28 December), the latest airdate in the series relative to Christmas. At 31 minutes 47 seconds, it is the shortest episode in the original series.

The story concerns a family consisting of Katharine (Kate Binchy), Peter (Peter Bowles), and Verity (Maxine Gordon) who move to a rural cottage from the city. Workmen are brought in to try and remove a large stone which is embedded in the grass outside the cottage, but their attempts appear to unleash a supernatural force which causes Katharine to start bleeding from invisible wounds.

"Stigma" is the first instalment in the series not based on a pre-existing work, and the last to be directed by Clark. Hill, who had been brought on as producer in 1973, favoured contemporary stories as opposed to the period adaptations which had been the norm for the series. Clark's ambivalence to this direction led to his departure, and the series' original run would only last another year before ending. Critical and audience response was likewise negative, though in recent years it has been reassessed as a worthy piece of folk horror and body horror that stands alongside supernatural television plays of the decade such as those produced for Play for Today.

== Plot ==
The film concerns a family who have just moved into a cottage in the countryside. The cottage is situated near an ancient megalithic stone circle, and one of the stones is in the garden of the cottage. The family arranges to have the stone moved. However, as two workmen attempt to lift a large, heavy stone from their garden, an ancient curse is unleashed which causes the mother to bleed uncontrollably, despite having no wounds. Once the stone is finally moved, a skeleton is found buried there. The implication is that the mother's body is re-enacting the ritual execution of a witch who was buried under the stone centuries earlier.

== Cast ==
- Kate Binchy as Katharine
- Peter Bowles as Peter
- Maxine Gordon as Verity
- Jon Laurimore as Dr. Hall
- Christopher Blake as Richard
- John Judd as Dave

== Production ==
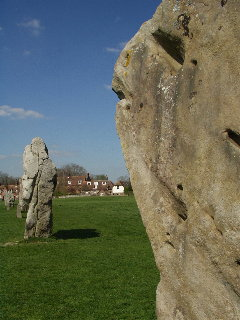
The prehistoric stones of Avebury where the production was filmed

The production was filmed at Avebury, Wiltshire, which had also been the location used for the ITV series Children of the Stones (screened earlier the same year). The production is unlike the previous films in the Ghost Story For Christmas strand in several ways; it is the first to be an original story and the first to be set in the then-present day. Critical opinion is decidedly mixed, with the decision to move away from adaptations of classic ghost stories the main concern. David Kerekes, author of Creeping Flesh: The Horror Fantasy Film Book: Volume 1, suggested that "the problem is that this is not a ghost story. "Stigma" is a straight down the line horror story. Although it's a perfectly competent television production, it just doesn't fit in with the feel of what a Christmas ghost story should be."

== Home video ==
In 2012, to mark the 150th anniversary of M. R. James' birth, "Stigma" was released on DVD by the BFI alongside "The Signalman" (1976) and "The Ice House" (1978) in the same release, and the entire run of A Ghost Story for Christmas from 1971-2010 was released in a DVD box set, which was updated the following year to include additional material. All three releases featured an essay on "Stigma" by professor Helen Wheatley and a filmed introduction by Lawrence Gordon Clark.

In 2023 it was remastered in 2k resolution by the BFI and released on Blu-ray alongside "The Treasure of Abbot Thomas" (1974), "The Ash Tree" (1975), "The Signalman", "The Ice House", "A View from a Hill" (2005), and "Number 13" (2006) as Ghost Stories for Christmas - Volume 2. This included Helen Wheatley's essay, the Lawrence Gordon Clark introduction, and a newly-recorded commentary by critics Kim Newman and Sean Hogan.
