= The Treasure of Abbot Thomas =

1904 ghost story by M.R. James

- Short story by M. R. James
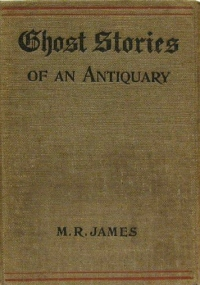
- Ghost Stories of an Antiquary

Text available at Wikisource
- Country: United Kingdom
- Language: English
- Genre: Horror

Publication
- Published in: Ghost Stories of an Antiquary
- Publication type: Anthology
- Publisher: Edward Arnold
- Media type: Print (hardback)
- Publication date: 1904

"The Treasure of Abbot Thomas" is a ghost story by British writer M. R. James. It was published in his books Ghost Stories of an Antiquary (1904) and The Collected Ghost Stories of M. R. James (1931). It concerns cryptic clues leading to a hidden treasure in the grounds of Steinfeld Abbey. It was adapted by the BBC as part of its A Ghost Story for Christmas series in 1974.

== Plot summary ==
In 1859, the antiquary Mr. Somerton translates a Latin passage from the Sertum Steinfeldense Norbertinum as part of his research into the stained glass windows of Steinfeld Abbey in the Eifel region of Germany, which are believed to have been brought to England shortly after the German revolutions of 1848–1849. The passage refers to the legend of Abbot Thomas von Eschenhausen having hidden gold somewhere in the Abbey grounds, cryptically saying that "Job, John, and Zechariah will tell either you or your successors". Before his death in 1529, Abbot Thomas had made various improvements to the Abbey, including installing the windows in question. Sometime after reading the passage, Somerton locates the windows in Lord D——'s private chapel. The windows depict Job, John, and Zechariah, each holding books or scrolls respectively bearing the text "Auro est locus in quo absconditur", (Note: Latin for "There is a place for the gold where it is hidden." Taken from Job 28:1.) "Habent in vestimentis suis scripturam quam nemo novit", (Note: Latin for "They have on their raiment a writing which no man knoweth." Taken from Revelation 19:16 and 12.) and "Super lapidem unum septem oculi sunt". (Note: Latin for "Upon one stone are seven eyes." Taken from Zechariah 3:9) Surmising that the windows contain a clue to the location of the gold, Somerton finds that the robes worn by the three figures bear an inscription concealed by black pigment. Scraping off the pigment, Somerton finds a "hopeless jumble of letters"; a clue given by the fingers of the painted figures enable him to decipher the following message:

"Ten thousand pieces of gold are laid up in the well in the court of the Abbot's house of Steinfeld by me, Thomas, who have set a guardian over them. Gare à qui la touche." (Note: French for "Let him who touches it beware.")

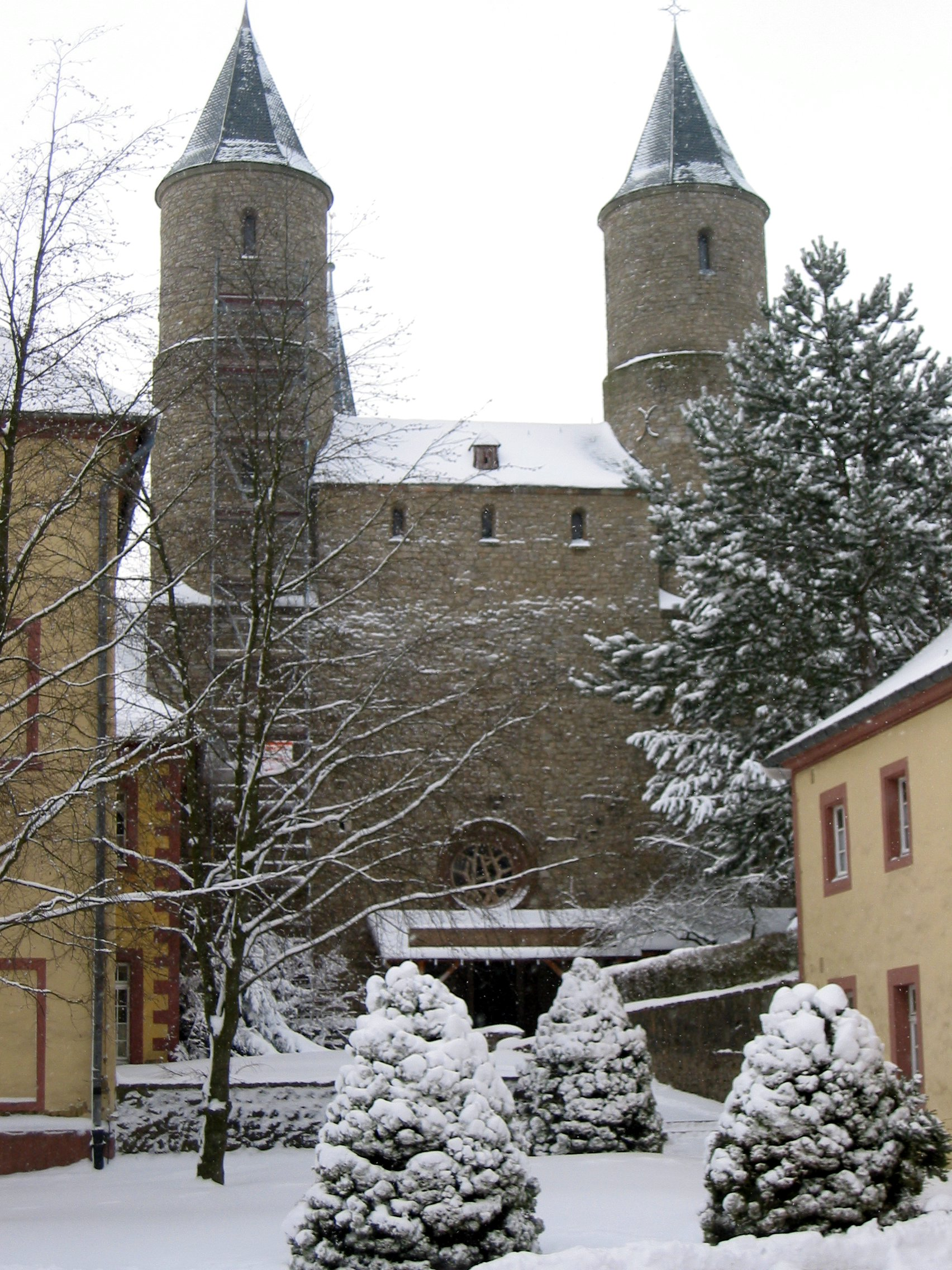
Steinfeld Abbey

Somerton and his valet, William Brown, travel to Eifel in pursuit of the gold. Searching the grounds of Steinfeld Abbey, they find a well-head at the site of the Abbot's house, with a stone staircase descending into the well. Returning that night with ropes to search the well, they find an engraving on the internal wall of the well depicting seven eyes in the shape of a cross. Somerton removes the engraved slab to find a cavity containing "some rounded light-coloured objects within which might be bags". Reaching into the cavity, Somerton encounters a damp, heavy, leathery object. As he draws the object out of the cavity, he accidentally knocks over his candle. At that moment, Brown runs to the top of the staircase. As Somerton pulls the "bag" free, "it hung for an instant on the edge of the hole, then slipped forward on to my chest, and put its arms round my neck." He is aware of a mouldy smell, a cold face pressed against his own, and limbs clinging to his body. He falls off the step, with the unseen creature slipping off him. Brown hauls Somerton out of the well using the rope and the two men retreat to the inn. Brown explains that he saw the face of an old man looking into the well and laughing, which Somerton interprets as the ghost of Abbot Thomas "come to see the success of his plan".

Bedridden with shock, Somerton feels "there was someone or something on the watch outside my door the whole night. I almost fancy there were two"; he hears noises and detects a mouldy smell. The noises and smell disappear at daybreak, leading Somerton to surmise "the thing or things were creatures of darkness, and could not stand the daylight". He instructs Brown to write to his friend Mr. Gregory, the Rector of Parsbury in Berkshire, summoning him to Steinfeld. Gregory immediately sails to Antwerp and takes a train to Koblenz, then travels onward to Steinfeld, meeting Brown and Somerton at the village inn. Somerton asks Gregory to fix the engraved slab back in place the following morning, saying "You needn't be in the least alarmed; it's perfectly safe in the daytime". He advises Gregory to lock his door; during the night, Gregory hears "a fumbling about the lower part of his locked door" on several occasions. The following morning, Gregory and Brown carry out Somerton's request, then the three men set off home for England. During the journey, Somerton tells the full story to Gregory, who notes that, while reinstating the slab, he saw a carving on the well-head showing a grotesque toad-like shape, with the words "Depositum custodi". (Note: Latin for "Keep that which is committed to thee.")

== Publication ==
"The Treasure of Abbot Thomas" was written in summer 1904 and published later that year in James' book Ghost Stories of an Antiquary, having been written to "fill up" the book. In 1931, it was collected in James' book The Collected Ghost Stories of M. R. James. It has since been anthologised many times. The story was partially inspired by James locating stained glass from Steinfeld Abbey in the collection of Baron Brownlow at Ashridge during 1904.

== Reception ==
Bob Hodges writes "James's 'The Treasure of Abbot Thomas' (1904) owes much to the cryptography of Poe's 'The Gold-Bug' (1843)."

Darryl Jones identifies Abbot Thomas von Eschenhausen as a fictionalised version of Johannes Trithemius.

== Adaptations ==
In 1974, the story was adapted as part of the BBC's A Ghost Story for Christmas strand by John Griffith Bowen as The Treasure of Abbot Thomas. It was first broadcast on 23 December 1974 at 11.35 PM. The adaptation stars Michael Bryant as Somerton, and it was directed by Lawrence Gordon Clark. In creating his adaptation, Bowen changed a number of elements of M. R. James's story, such as including another character – Peter, Lord Dattering (Note: Listed as such in the film credits and addressed as "Lord Dattering" in the film; he is incorrectly listed as "Lord Peter Dattering" on IMDb, which would be a courtesy title borne by a younger son, who would be addressed as "Lord Peter".) (Paul Lavers) – as Somerton's protégé, with whom he shares his investigation. The story is not told in flashback, and also includes a scene in which Somerton exposes two fraudulent mediums, which acts as a demonstration of Somerton's rational approach to the supernatural.

On New Year's Day in 1988, a radio play parody of "The Treasure of Abbot Thomas" titled The Teeth of Abbot Thomas aired on BBC Radio 4. Described by the Radio Times as a "rib-tickling, toe-curling tale of orthodontic outrage" about "the ghastly secret that lies behind a set of wooden false teeth", the radio play was written by Stephen Sheridan and featured the voices of Caroline Gruber, John Baddeley, Phil Nice, and Stephen Tompkinson.

Michele Soavi's 1989 film The Church — featuring a script co-authored by Dario Argento — borrows the motif of the "stone with seven eyes", as well as a few other details, from "The Treasure of Abbot Thomas".
