= Lost Hearts (film) =

1973 British television ghost story

- Title screen
- Based on: "Lost Hearts" by M. R. James
- Written by: Robin Chapman
- Directed by: Lawrence Gordon Clark
- Starring: Joseph O'Conor as Mr. Abney; Simon Gipps-Kent as Stephen; Susan Richards as Mrs. Bunch; James Mellor as Parkes; Christopher Davis as Giovanni; Michelle Foster as Phoebe; Roger Milner as Vicar

Production
- Producer: Rosemary Hill
- Running time: 34 minutes

Original release
- Release: 25 December 1973

Related
- A Ghost Story for Christmas

Lost Hearts is a short film, the third of the British supernatural anthology series A Ghost Story for Christmas. Written by Robin Chapman, produced by Rosemary Hill, and directed by the series' creator, Lawrence Gordon Clark, it is based on the 1895 ghost story of the same name by M. R. James and first aired on BBC1 on 25 December 1973. It is the first instalment to have been broadcast on Christmas Day itself, and one of only three in the series' history.

It stars Joseph O'Conor as Mr. Abney, a reclusive alchemist who takes in his much younger cousin, Stephen (Simon Gipps-Kent). Stephen finds himself troubled by visions of two children who are revealed to have previously been taken in by Abney, and whose grisly fates potentially foreshadow his own.

"Lost Hearts" was the first instalment not to be written and produced by Clark, who had helmed the first two singlehandedly under the auspices of the BBC Documentary Unit. A "victim of his own success", the series was brought under Hill at the Drama Department, with Clark staying on as director for all but the final entry in the original run. Since airing it has received praise from critics.

== Synopsis ==
The drama tells the story of Stephen Elliott, a young orphan aged 11 years and of an inquiring frame of mind, who is sent to stay with his much older cousin, the scholarly Mr Abney, at a remote country mansion, Aswarby Hall, in Lincolnshire. His cousin is a reclusive alchemist obsessed with making himself immortal. Abney's library "contained all the then available books bearing on the Mysteries, the Orphic poems, the worship of Mithras, and the Neo–Platonists." Stephen is repeatedly troubled by visions of a young gypsy girl and a travelling Italian boy with their hearts missing.

== Cast ==
- Joseph O'Conor as Mr. Abney
- Simon Gipps-Kent as Stephen
- Susan Richards as Mrs. Bunch
- James Mellor as Parkes
- Christopher Davis as Giovanni
- Michelle Foster as Phoebe
- Roger Milner as Vicar

== Production ==
=== Locations ===
Grade II* listed Ormsby Hall in South Ormsby in Lincolnshire stood in for the exterior shots of Aswarby Hall, while the churchyard of the nearby St Leonard's church in the village featured in the final scenes including the ghostly children waving to Stephen.

Harrington Hall in Harrington, Lincolnshire was used for the interior of Aswarby Hall, as well as a few outside scenes. The interiors seen in the film were all destroyed by a fire which occurred in 1991.

The Pelham Mausoleum near Brocklesby in Great Limber near Grimsby also featured in the production.

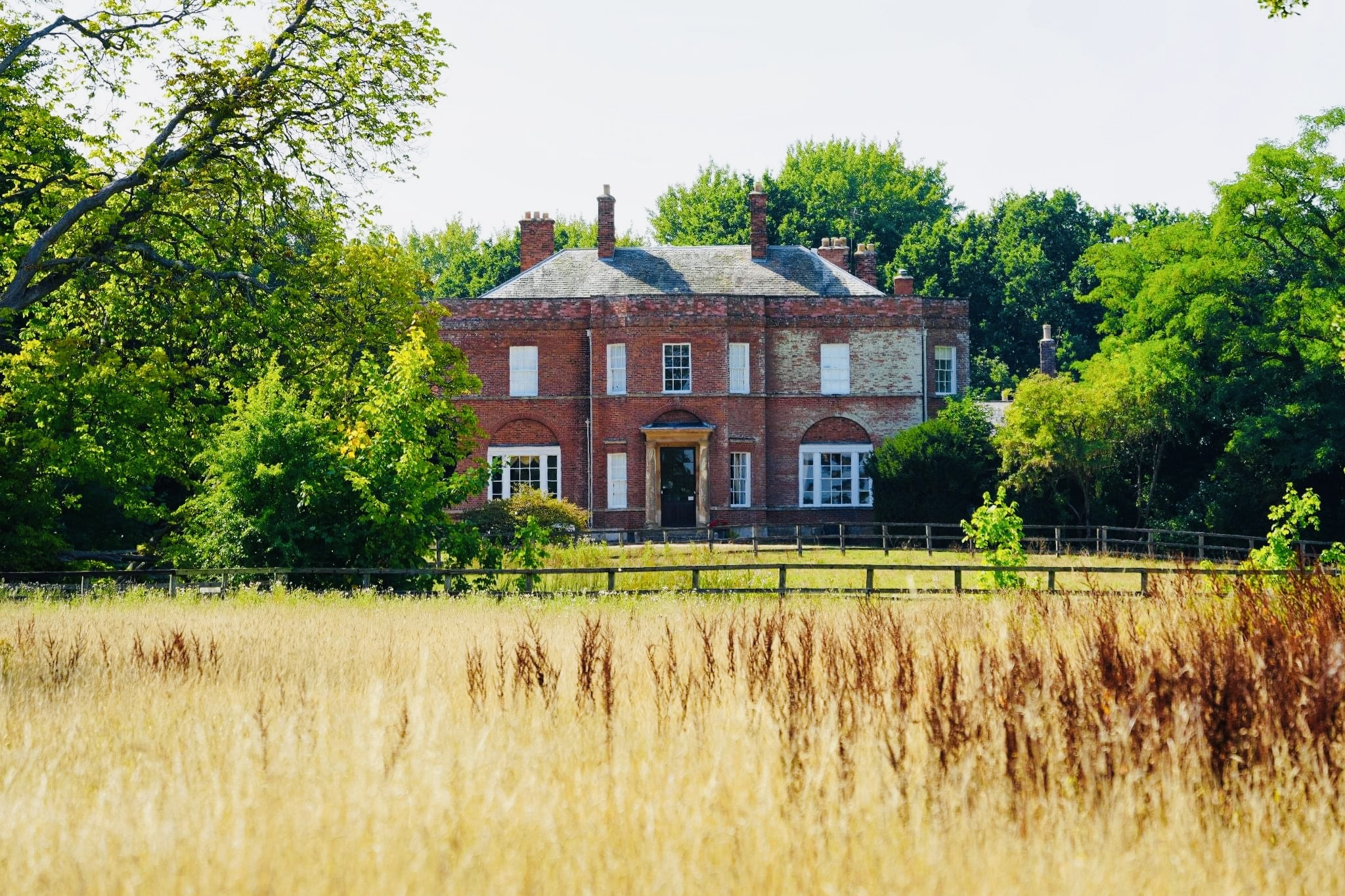
Ormsby Hall in Lincolnshire stood in as Aswarby Hall

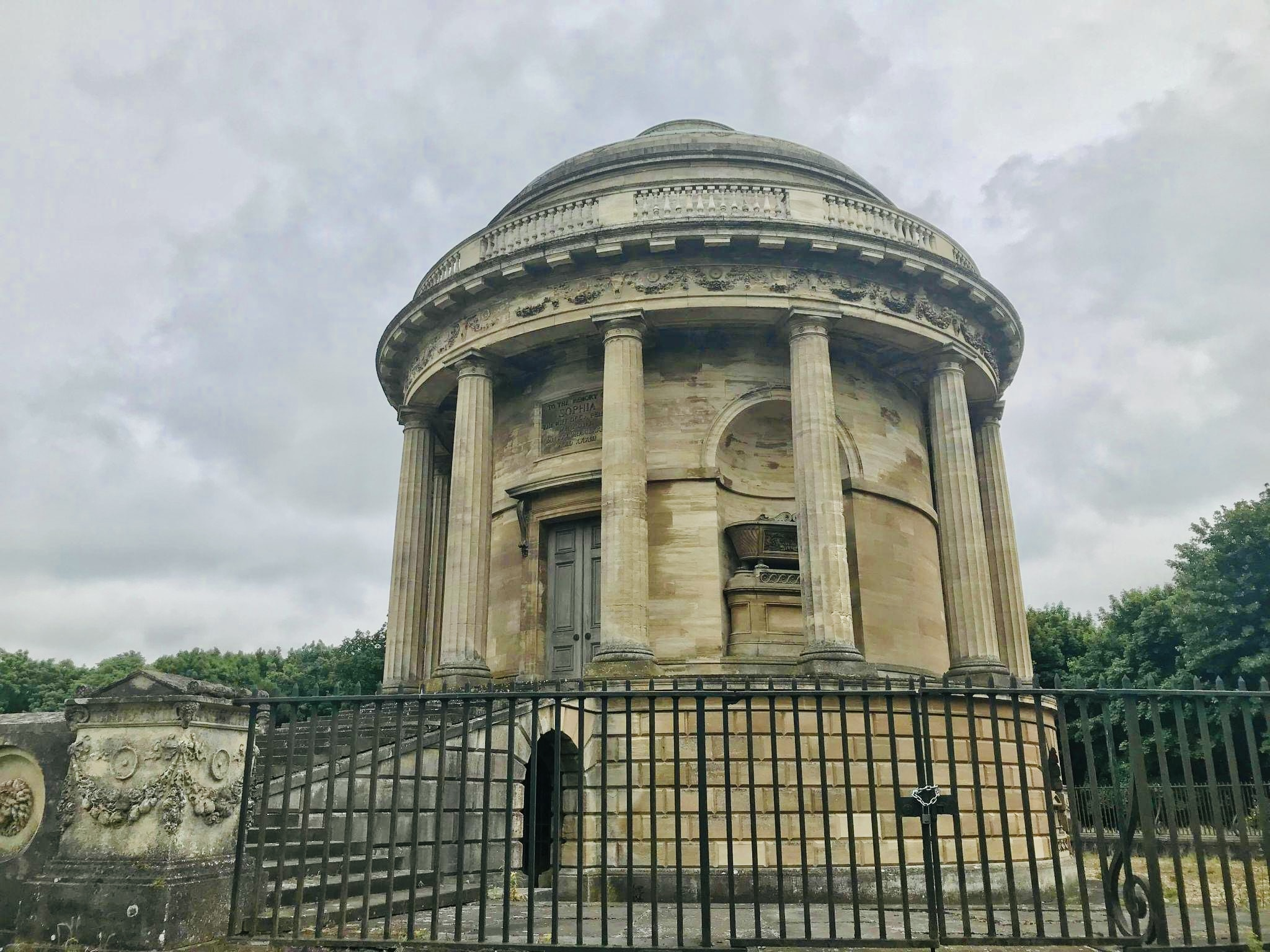
The Pelham Mausoleum near Grimsby in Lincolnshire appeared in the drama

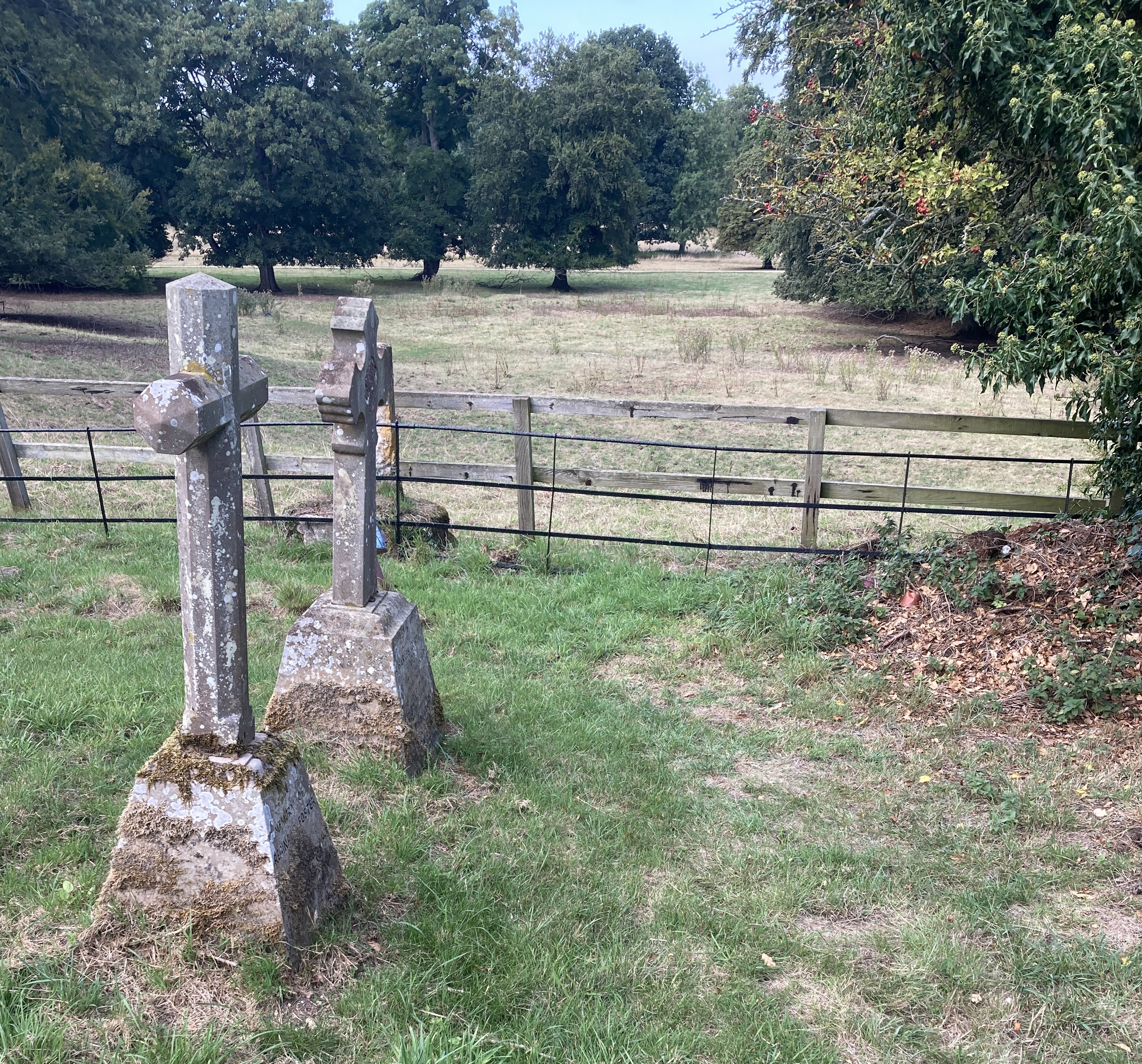
The churchyard of St Leonard's church in South Ormsby appeared in the film's final scene

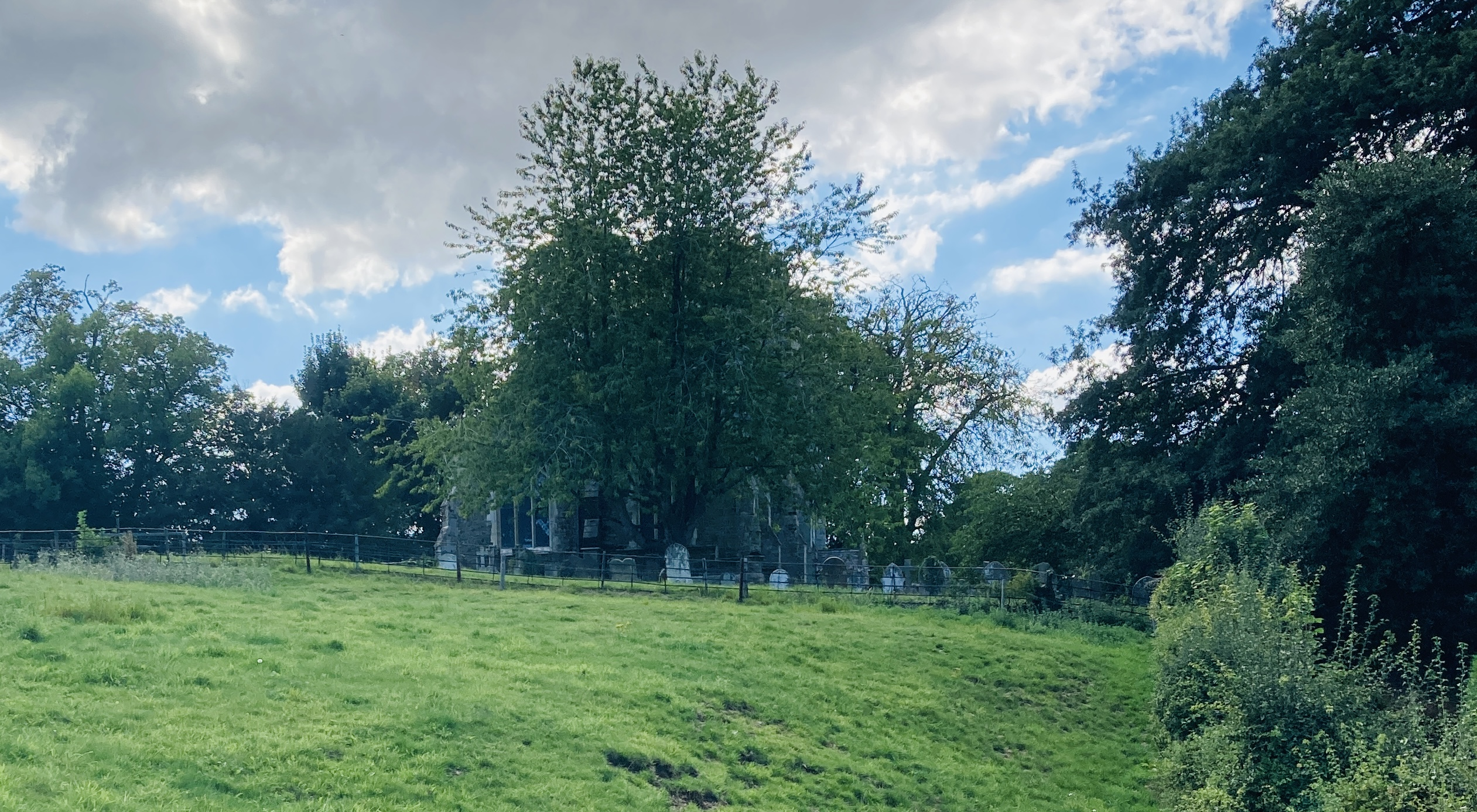
St Leonard's church and churchyard from the village

=== Music ===
Most music from the film is taken from Hyperion III, a 1966 avant-garde piece by Bruno Maderna. The 25-minute recording was performed by the Southwest German Radio Symphony Orchestra, Baden Baden, with Severino Gazzelloni on the flute. Also featured is My Bonny Boy from Ralph Vaughan Williams English Folk Song Suite, performed by the London Symphony Orchestra, conducted by Sir Adrian Boult. This piece accompanies the scene of Stephen flying his kite. Two pieces from The Minstrel of Clare, a collection of Irish folk music by Willie Clancy, also feature: The Templehouse and Over the Moor to Maggie, and Caoineadh an Spailpín (The Spalpeen's Lament). These are used during the flashbacks to Phoebe's arrival at, and disappearance from, Abney's house.

The adaptation is noted for the distinctive hurdy-gurdy music that accompanies appearances of the two ghostly children. This has been wrongly identified as L'amour de Moi, a 15th Century French folk song, but BBC copyright documentation confirms that this title is instead the tune hummed briefly by Joseph O'Conor. The actual hurdy-gurdy tune is listed as an instrumental folk song from an LP of recordings made for the BBC Recorded Programs Permanent Library in 1961. The Archive catalogue confirms the tune to be La Mère Jeanne, performed by Monique and Jacqueline Claude. The instrument on the recording is not a hurdy-gurdy but the Epinette des Vosges, a type of zither from the Vosges region of France.

The BBC catalogue states that La Mère Jeanne is a traditional tune, however the original sheet music - which includes French lyrics - credits Pierre Dupont as composer.

== Home video ==
"Lost Hearts" was first released on DVD in Australia in 2011 by Shock Entertainment as part of the box set The Complete Ghost Stories of M. R. James.

In 2012, to mark the 150th anniversary of James' birth, "Lost Hearts" was released on DVD by the BFI alongside "The Treasure of Abbot Thomas" (1974) and "The Ash Tree" (1975) in the same release, and the entire run of A Ghost Story for Christmas from 1971-2010 was released in a DVD box set, which was updated the following year to include additional material. All three releases featured an essay on "Lost Hearts" by author Ramsey Campbell and a filmed introduction by Lawrence Gordon Clark.

In 2022 it was remastered in 2k resolution by the BFI and released on Blu-ray alongside "Whistle and I'll Come to You" (1968 and 2010), "The Stalls of Barchester" (1971), and "A Warning to the Curious" (1972) as Ghost Stories for Christmas - Volume 1. This included Ramsey Campbell's essay, the Lawrence Gordon Clark introduction, and a newly-recorded commentary by critics Kim Newman and Sean Hogan.
