= Number 13 (2006 film) =

2006 British television ghost story

- Title screen
- Based on: "Number 13" by M. R. James
- Written by: Justin Hopper
- Directed by: Pier Wilkie
- Starring: Greg Wise as Mr Anderson; Paul Freeman as Harrington; David Burke as Gunton; Tom Burke as Jenkins; Charlotte Comer as Alice Goddard; Anton Saunders as Hotel Porter

Production
- Producer: Richard Fell
- Running time: 40 minutes

Original release
- Release: 22 December 2006

Number 13 is a short film which is part of the British supernatural anthology series A Ghost Story for Christmas. Written by Justin Hopper, produced by Richard Fell, and directed by Pier Wilkie, it is based on the ghost story of the same name by M. R. James, first published in the collection Ghost Stories of an Antiquary (1904), and first Broadcast on BBC Four on 22 December 2006.

It stars Greg Wise as Prof. Anderson, an academic who, whilst assigned to authenticate papers which appear to date back to the Reformation, stays in room 12 of a drafty hotel which has no room 13 in a small English cathedral town. When he awakes one night to discover that the door to room 13 has mysteriously appeared, he decides to investigate, with fearful consequences.

== Cast ==
- Greg Wise as Mr Anderson
- Paul Freeman as Harrington
- David Burke as Gunton
- Tom Burke as Jenkins
- Charlotte Comer as Alice Goddard
- Anton Saunders as Hotel Porter

== Production ==
Director Pier Wilkie had produced the previous year's "A View from a Hill". David Burke, who had appeared in that instalment, also appeared in "Number 13", this time alongside his son Tom Burke.

It was the last episode to originally air on BBC Four until "The Dead Room" (2018).

== Home video ==
"Number 13" was first released on DVD in Australia in 2011 by Shock Entertainment as part of the box set The Complete Ghost Stories of M. R. James.

In 2012, to mark the 150th anniversary of James' birth, "Number 13" was released on DVD by the BFI alongside "A View from a Hill" (2005) in the same release, and the entire run of A Ghost Story for Christmas from 1971-2010 was released in a DVD box set, which was updated the following year to include additional material.

In 2023 it was released on Blu-ray by the BFI alongside "The Treasure of Abbot Thomas" (1974) "The Ash Tree" (1975), "The Signalman" (1976), "Stigma" (1977), "The Ice House" (1978), and "A View from a Hill" as Ghost Stories for Christmas - Volume 2.
