= The Ash-tree =

1904 short story by M. R. James

- Short story by M. R. James
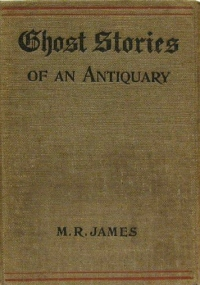
- "The Ash-tree" was published in Ghost Stories of an Antiquary in 1904

Text available at Wikisource
- Country: United Kingdom
- Language: English
- Genre: Horror

Publication
- Published in: Ghost Stories of an Antiquary
- Publisher: Edward Arnold
- Publication date: 1904

"The Ash-tree" is a ghost story by British writer M. R. James, included in his 1904 book Ghost Stories of an Antiquary, and also collected again in his 1931 book The Collected Ghost Stories of M. R. James. It concerns mysterious deaths relating to an ash tree. It has been adapted many times, including a 1963 episode of KPFA/KPFK's The Black Mass, a 1975 episode of the BBC's A Ghost Story for Christmas, a 1986 episode of BBC2's Classic Ghost Stories series, and a 2000 episode of BBC Scotland's series Christopher Lee's Ghost Stories For Christmas.

== Plot summary ==
=== 1690 ===
In 1690, the English county of Suffolk is wracked with a fear of witches. Many women are accused of casting spells and causing mayhem. One such accused is Mrs. Mothersole. The only evidence of her witchcraft are eyewitness accounts by Sir Matthew Fell, the owner of a local seat named Castringham. Outside his bedroom window grows a monstrous ash tree, where on moonlit nights he would supposedly see Mrs. Mothersole climbing the trunk and snipping branches with a dagger. Despite her pleas, she is found guilty and hanged. Before the noose is pulled, she dully intones "There will be guests at the Hall." She is buried in the local graveyard.

A few weeks later, Sir Matthew and the local vicar are walking by the ash tree at dusk when they spy a creature in the branches that disappears before they can get a good look. As it is a warm night, the squire leaves his window open. The next day, he is found dead in bed with a severe look of pain and terror on his face. Though a postmortem is performed, no cause of death is found. The coroner, Mr. Crome, impulsively carries out the sortes biblicae, reading Luke 13:7, ("Cut it down"); Isaiah 13:20 ("It shall never be inhabited"), and Job 39:30 ("Her young ones also suck up blood").

Sir Matthew's son, Sir Matthew II, inherits Castringham and refuses to stay in his father's bedroom. Over forty years pass and he passes away in 1735. When the family plot in the local graveyard needs to be expanded to fit his remains, Mrs. Mothersole's resting place is exhumed to make room and her coffin is found to be empty. The locals are puzzled as to who could have robbed the grave.

=== 1754 ===
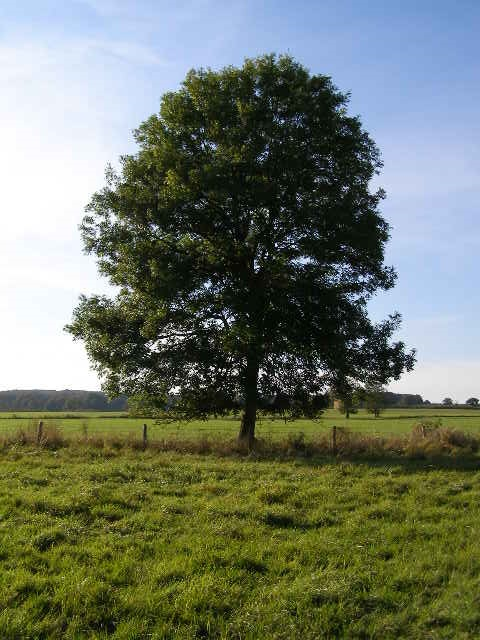
An ash tree

Sir Matthew II's son, Sir Richard, inherits the seat and also refuses to stay in the supposedly cursed bedroom. In 1754, however, he grows tired of the alternate chamber he chose, as it is cold and smoky. He orders the housekeeper to move his bed into the room where his grandfather died decades previously. That night, he keeps his window closed but hears something scratching on it.

The next day, he is visited by the grandson of the vicar from over sixty years ago, now a vicar himself. They chat about Sir Matthew's death and discover an old Bible of his, where he wrote down his desire for the ash tree to be felled. Sir Richard assures the vicar a man from the village will come the next day and dispose of it.

That evening, several guests arrive for a weekend visit. Talking to the Bishop of Kilmore, Sir Richard remarks on the strange scratching noises from the window the night previously, blaming the sounds on branches scraping against the glass. The Bishop says this is impossible, as the branches don't reach the window. They conclude it was rats that climbed the ivy. Sir Richard carries out the sortes biblicae, reading Job 7:21 ("Thou shalt seek me in the morning, and I shall not be").

After dinner, everyone retires to their rooms. In the middle of the night, something climbs through Sir Richard's open window and bites him. The next morning, he is found dead in bed and the guests congregate to discover the secret of the tree. A gardener climbs a ladder and peeks into a hollow in the center, seeing something that causes him to drop his lantern in alarm and set the tree ablaze.

The guests watch in horror as countless large, venomous spiders crawl out of the hollow on fire, before dying on the lawn. An investigation beneath the tree reveals a cavernous spider's nest containing the withered skeleton of a woman (presumably the remains of Mrs. Mothersole), dead for at least fifty years.

== Publication ==
"The Ash-tree" was first published in Ghost Stories of an Antiquary in 1904. It was collected again in The Collected Ghost Stories of M. R. James in 1931. It has since been anthologised many times. In a 1904 letter, James gave the story the title "The Spiders". The original manuscript was auctioned by Sotheby's on 9 November 1936.

== Reception ==
S. T. Joshi describes "The Ash-tree" as "perhaps the most explicitly grisly" of James' stories. The horror historian Robert S. Hadji included "The Ash-tree" on his 1983 list of the most frightening horror stories.

== Adaptations ==
On 18 December 1963, "The Ash Tree" was dramatised for The Black Mass, an American anthology series broadcast on KPFA (Berkeley) and KPFK (Los Angeles). The series was produced by Eric Bauersfeld.

In 1975, "The Ash-tree" was adapted by David Rudkin as "The Ash Tree", and was part of the BBC's A Ghost Story for Christmas anthology series. It was first broadcast on 23 December 1975 at 11.35 PM. The adaptation stars Edward Petherbridge as Sir Richard and Barbara Ewing as the witch, Anne Mothersole. It was directed by Lawrence Gordon Clark.

On 27 December 1986, a television adaptation of "The Ash-tree" aired on BBC2 as part of its Classic Ghost Stories programme. The adaptation featured a dramatic reading of the story by Robert Powell, with some scenes depicted by actors.

In 2000, a dramatized narration of the story with Sir Christopher Lee as James was produced by BBC Scotland as part of the series Christopher Lee's Ghost Stories For Christmas, adapted by Ronald Frame.

In October 2007, Nunkie Theatre Company toured a one-man show featuring retellings of James's tales, Oh, Whistle ..., comprising "'Oh, Whistle, and I'll Come to You, My Lad'" and "The Ash-tree".

In 2007, BBC Audio released Ghost Stories Volume One, which included "The Ash-tree".

In 2016, John Reppion and Leah Moore published Ghost Stories of an Antiquary, a graphic novel adaptation of four of James' stories, including "The Ash-tree" (illustrated by Alisdair Wood).

In 2019, a modern-day audio adaptation written by Matthew Holness and starring Amanda Abbington, Reece Shearsmith, and John Sessions was released by Bafflegab Productions.
