= Steinfeld Abbey =

Former abbey in Kall, Germany

Coordinates: 50°30′07″N 6°33′50″E

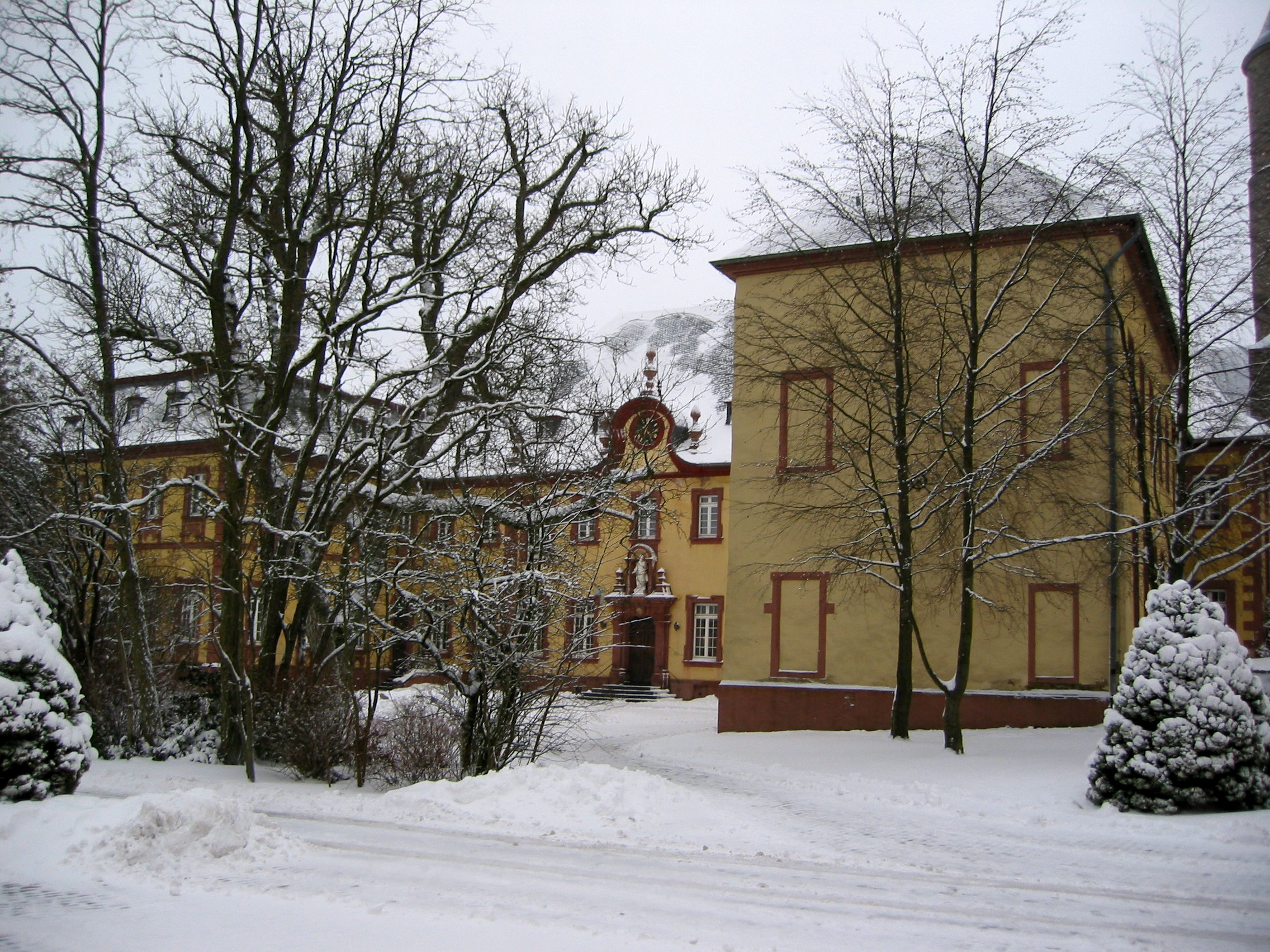
Steinfeld Abbey

Steinfeld Abbey (Kloster Steinfeld) is a former Premonstratensian monastery, now a Salvatorian convent, with an important basilica, in Steinfeld in Kall, North Rhine-Westphalia, Germany.

== History ==
The origins of the site go back to about 920. The first monastic settlement at Steinfeld took place in about 1070, and the Premonstratensians settled here in 1130. It became an important monastery in the German Empire, and established a number of daughter houses across Europe, including Strahov Abbey in Prague. It was raised to the status of an abbey in 1184.

In 1802, Steinfeld Abbey was secularised. The basilica was put to use as a parish church, while the conventual buildings were used for a number of secular purposes until 1923, when the Salvatorians acquired them.

== Basilica ==
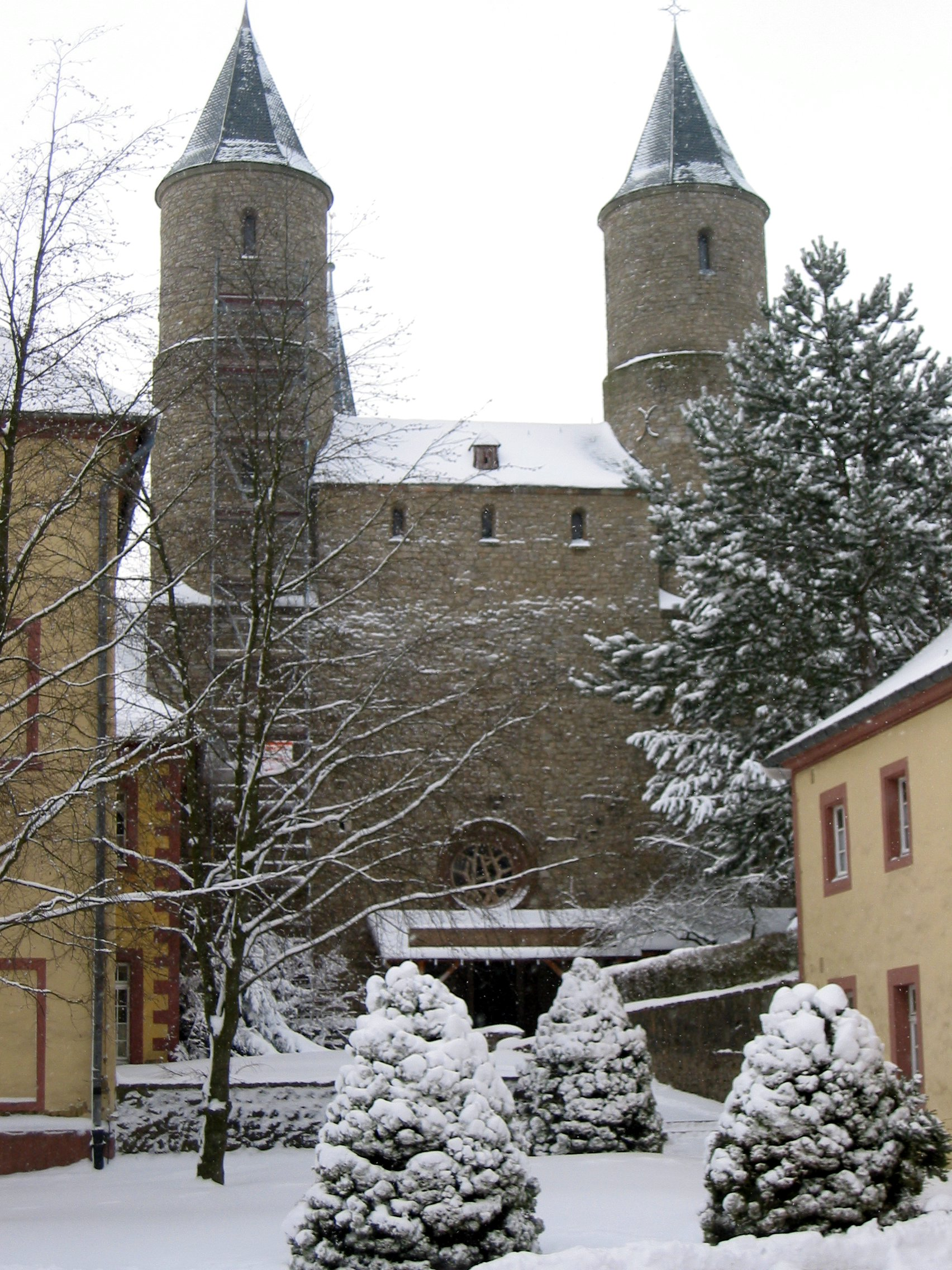
Steinfeld Basilica

The basilica, formerly the abbey church, was built between 1142 and 1150 by the Premonstratensians as one of the earliest vaulted churches in Germany. The present structure includes features from a number of periods and styles, from the original Romanesque style through Gothic, Renaissance and Baroque up to modern stainless steel elements.

The church received the status of a papal basilica minor in 1960. It comprises altogether eight bays and six chapels, including Saint Stephen's Chapel and Saint Ursula's Chapel.

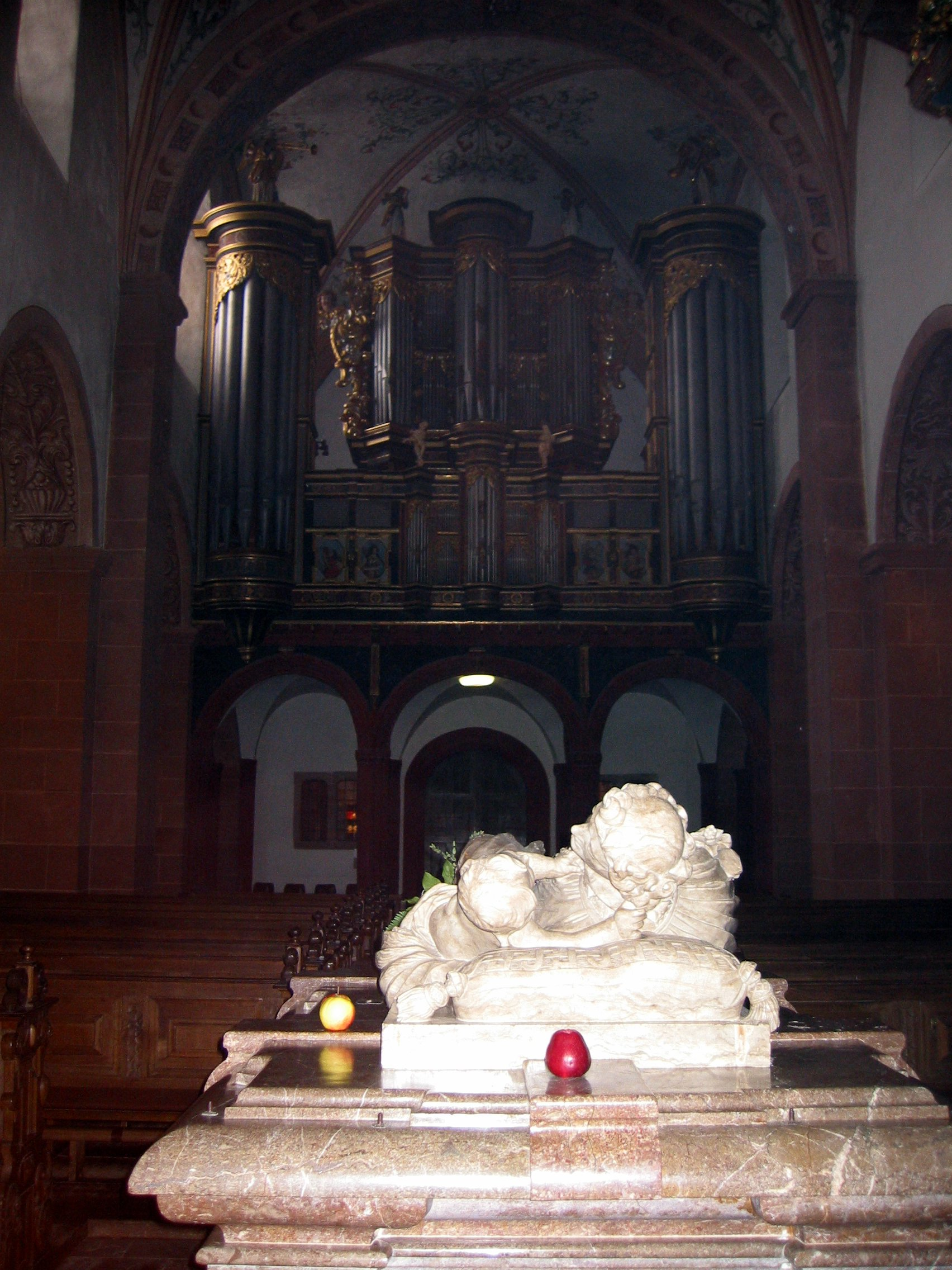
Tomb of Hermann Joseph (note the apple), with the König-Orgel in the background

The basilica contains the tomb of Hermann Joseph of Steinfeld, a popular Premonstratensian saint, situated in the middle of the church and covered with a slab and a recumbent figure of alabaster, carved in 1732. This has become a pilgrimage destination. By custom apples are left here, in reference to a legend that Hermann once offered an apple to the Christ Child in the arms of the Madonna in the church of St. Maria im Kapitol at Cologne - who took it.

== König Organ ==
The basilica also contains the well-known König-Orgel, one of the most significant church organs of the Rhineland Baroque period. It was built around 1600, with additions in 1680, 1727 and 1934. It was taken out of service in 1977. In 1981, the organ was thoroughly restored by the firm Josef Weimbs Orgelbau from Hellenthal. It is composed of 1,956 pipes and 35 registers; the original pipework is still largely intact.

== Cloister glass ==
The original Romanesque cloister was replaced between 1492 and 1517 by a Gothic one. After the dissolution in 1802 the stained glass windows, made between 1526 and 1557 by Gerhard Remisch, were sold by a local dealer to a compatriot in Norwich in England. Some panels found their way to village churches in East Anglia, but the majority reached Lord Brownlow's collection at Ashridge Park, from where they were purchased by the Victoria and Albert Museum. Two panels are now in Steinfeld again.

While at Ashridge the glass was catalogued by M. R. James, who identified it as originating from Steinfeld, on which he based the short story "The Treasure of Abbot Thomas".

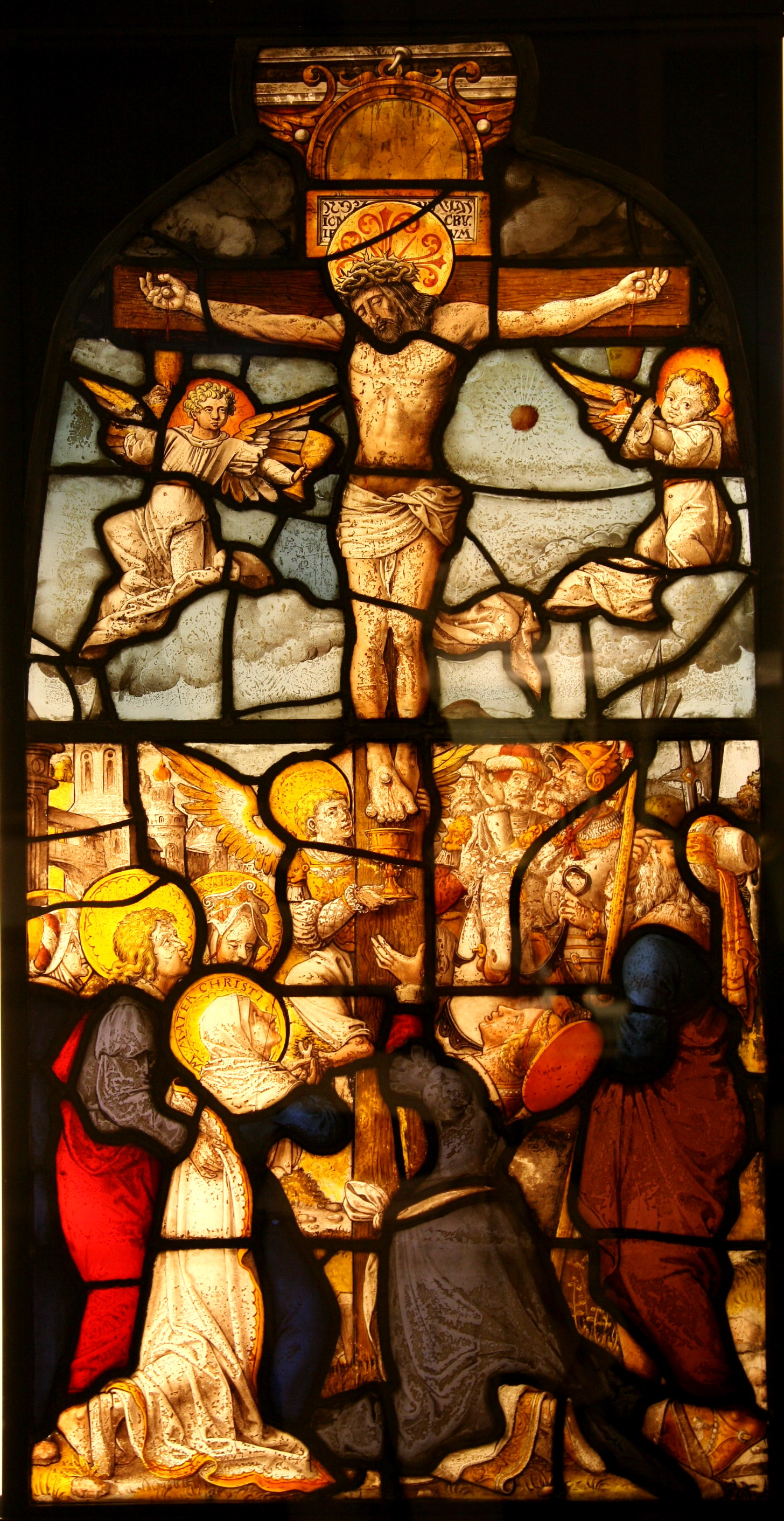
Stained glass window by Gerhard Remisch. Now exhibited at Victoria and Albert Museum

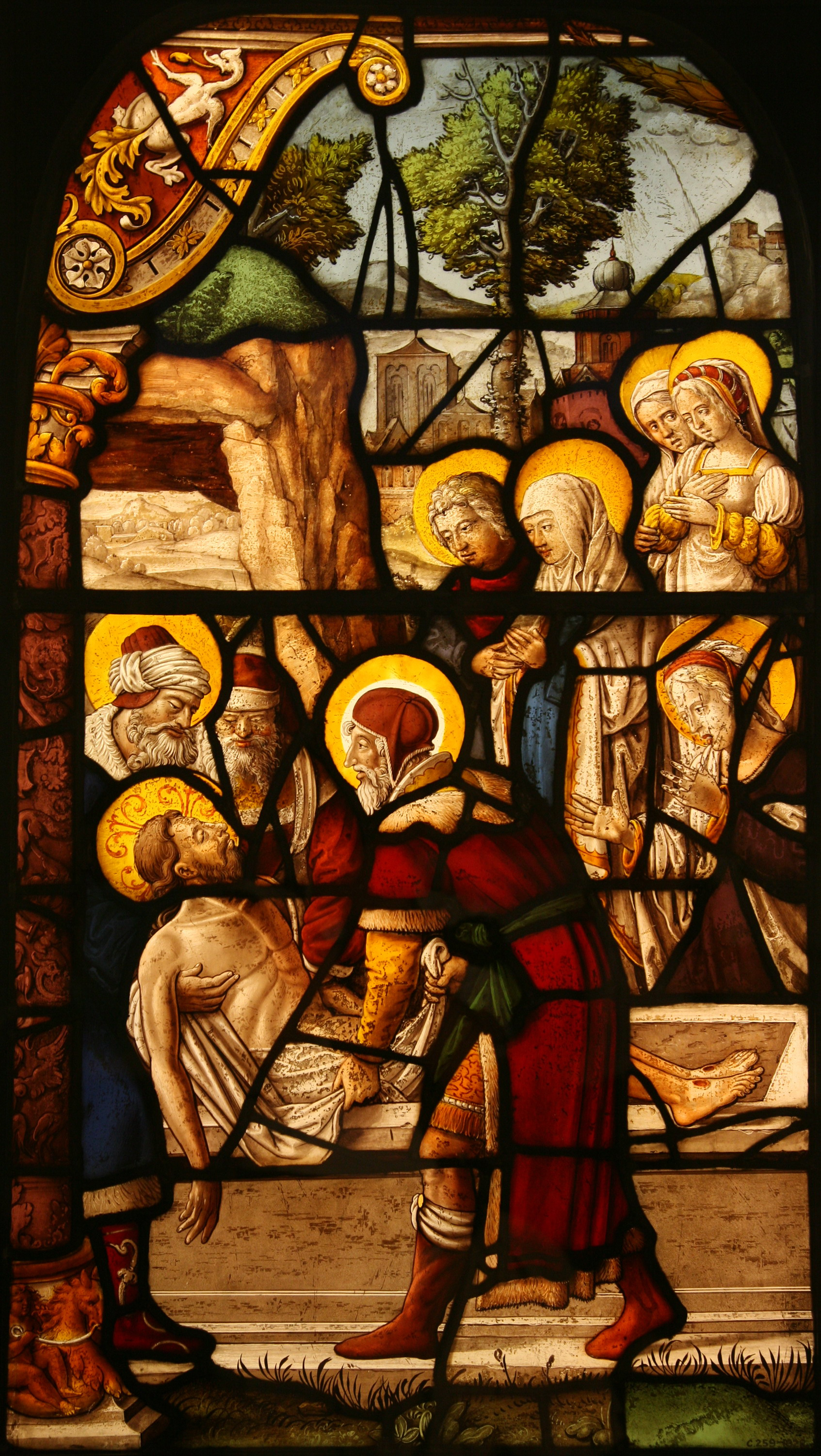
Stained glass window by Gerhard Remisch

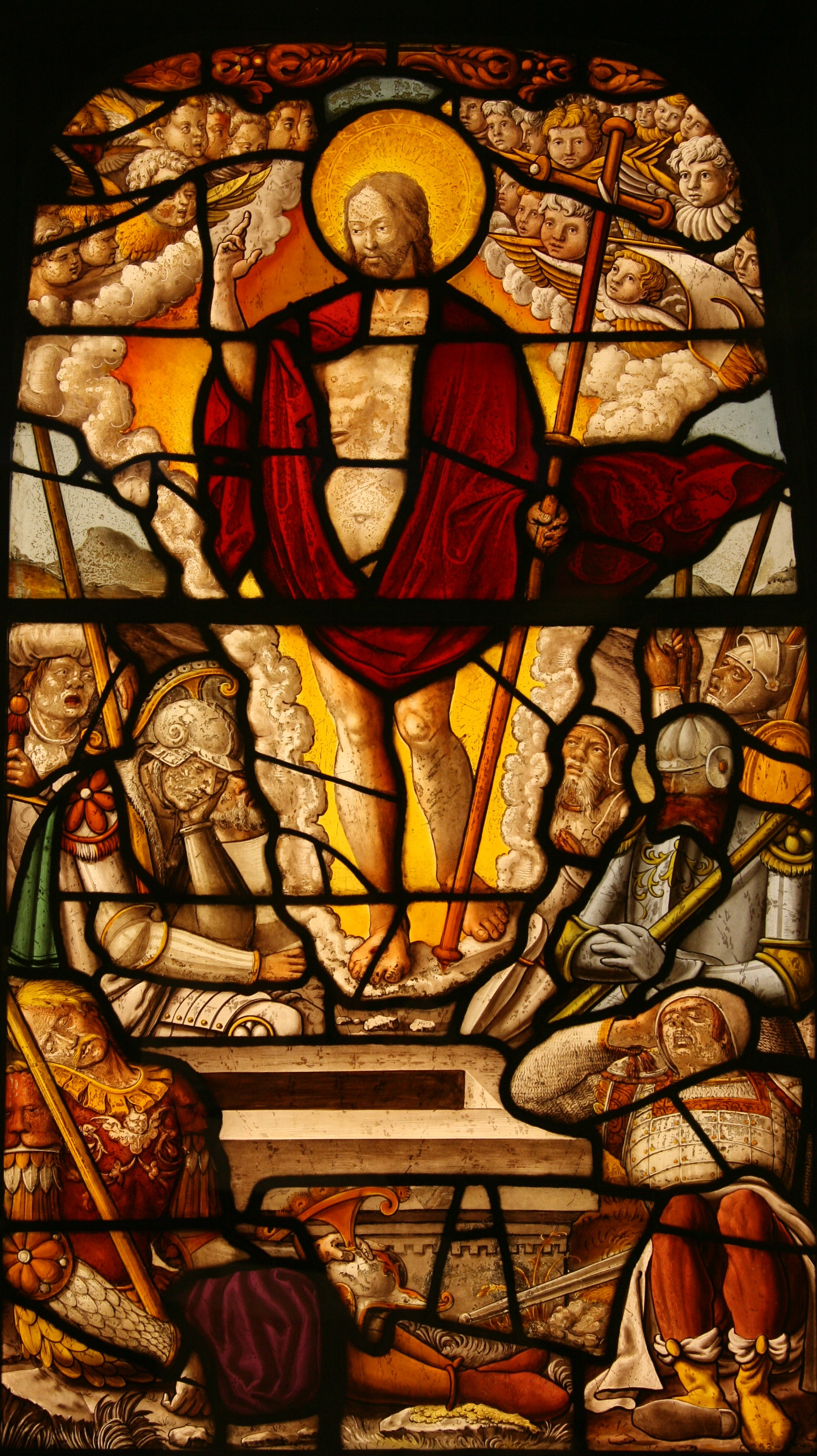
Stained glass window by Gerhard Remisch

== School ==
The monastery complex now includes a gymnasium, "Hermann-Josef-Kolleg Steinfeld", established in 1924.

== Literature ==
Steinfeld Abbey is the location of the M.R. James short ghost story The Treasure of Abbot Thomas from Ghost Stories of an Antiquary
