= A View from a Hill (film) =

2005 British television ghost story

- Title screen
- Based on: "A View from a Hill" by M. R. James
- Written by: Peter Harness
- Directed by: Luke Watson
- Starring: Mark Letheren as Dr. Fanshawe; Pip Torrens as Squire Richards; David Burke as Patten; Simon Linnell as Baxter

Production
- Producer: Pier Wilkie
- Running time: 39 minutes

Original release
- Network: BBC Four
- Release: 23 December 2005

Related
- A Ghost Story for Christmas

A View from a Hill is a short film which serves as the ninth episode of the British supernatural anthology series A Ghost Story for Christmas, and the first episode of its revival following the 1971–78 run. Written by Peter Harness, produced by Pier Wilkie, and directed by Luke Watson, it is based on the ghost story of the same name by M. R. James, first published in the collection A Warning to the Curious and Other Ghost Stories (1925), and first aired on BBC Four on 23 December 2005.

It stars Mark Letheren as historian Dr. Fanshawe, who visits the residence of Squire Richards (Pip Torrens) in order to catalogue and value an archaeological collection. He is lent a pair of binoculars which appear to show the ruins of a nearby abbey as they were when they were whole, and he soon discovers they belonged to a watchmaker named Baxter (Simon Linnell) who experimented with the bones of men hanged at a local gallows hill.

A Ghost Story for Christmas originally ran annually from 1971–1978, initially adapting James' stories before a move to original stories for the final two entries led to its cancellation. "A View from a Hill"" is the first episode of the 21st century revival, returning to the tradition of adapting James, and was the first instalment which didn't originally air on BBC One. It was well-received by critics, who compared it favourably to the original films.

== Plot ==
The film opens with Dr Fanshawe, an historian, waiting at a railway station for a car to arrive to take him to the house of Squire Richards, where he is to catalogue and value an archaeological collection which is to be sold. He gives up waiting and rides a bicycle to Squire Richards's house. On the way one of his bags falls off. When he unpacks his luggage later he finds his binoculars broken. He borrows a pair from Squire Richards.

During a walk through the countryside with the Squire, Fanshawe looks at a plain field through the binoculars and spots an abbey which is invisible other than through the glasses. Next to it is Gallows Hill, where a number of people were hanged. Richards explains that it was the site of an abbey that was dissolved by Henry VIII and there is nothing left of it but a few stones.

That night Fanshawe goes alone to Gallows Hill. He hears rustling in the bushes and comes to the spot where the gallows once stood. Thoroughly frightened by the feeling that he is being watched, he stumbles out of the woods and makes his way back to the Squire's house.

At dinner that evening Richards's butler, Patten, explains to Fanshawe how a local clockmaker called Baxter became obsessed with the old abbey and began going out at night to dig up the bones of the hanged men. While he was repairing his binoculars he bewitched them so that they would show the abbey to anyone who looked through them. Baxter then disappeared without a trace.

That night Fanshawe has a nightmare in which he goes to the bathroom to get a drink, only to find that the water in the cup is cloudy and contaminated. Hearing the water in the bathtub stop dripping, Fanshawe turns round, to be terrified by a shadowy figure lurking in the darkness wearing a skull mask.

The next day Fanshawe goes back to the site of the abbey with the boiled bones and sketches. Looking through the binoculars at the details of the abbey, he spots a figure lurking by one of the pillars, hears rustling and is knocked unconscious by an unseen attacker. He wakes after dark to find himself being dragged up Gallows Hill by an unseen force to the spot where the gallows stood.

Richards, Patten and a search party go looking for Fanshawe, and find his abandoned bike and sketches. They also spot a flock of birds gathering on top of Gallows Hill. Venturing up to investigate, they are met with the sight of Fanshawe hanging. He subsequently recovers.

The next day Patten burns all the sketches and boiled bones in a bonfire, and throws the binoculars in after them. Squire Richards accompanies Fanshawe to the railway station and then leaves. As Fanshawe sits on a bench waiting for the train he hears a loud rustling noise in the woods behind him.

== Cast ==
- Mark Letheren - Dr Fanshawe
- Pip Torrens - Squire Richards
- David Burke - Patten
- Simon Linnell - Baxter

== Production ==
The programme was made on location in the Thames Valley in November 2005, chosen because of its proximity to London.

The Manor House in Chertsey, originally named Barrow Hills, featured as the home of Squire Richards. It was built in 1853 and was purchased by the Ministry of Supply in 1952 for use as an officers' mess. In 2004 it was purchased by a consortium headed by Crest Nicholson PLC. Since then it has been used for several films and TV dramas. Turville in Oxfordshire is the village seen from the hill, St Michael's Abbey, Farnborough was used as Fulnaker Abbey and Longcross railway station for Dr. Fanshawe's arrival and departure.

The production was made on a limited budget, and several planned scenes had to be omitted or reduced for budgetary reasons.

== Home video ==
"A View from a Hill" was first released on DVD in Australia in 2011 by Shock Entertainment as part of the box set The Complete Ghost Stories of M. R. James.

In 2012, to mark the 150th anniversary of James' birth, "A View from a Hill" was released on DVD by the BFI alongside "Number 13" (2006) in the same release, and the entire run of A Ghost Story for Christmas from 1971-2010 was released in a DVD box set, which was updated the following year to include additional material.

In 2023 it was released on Blu-ray by the BFI alongside "The Treasure of Abbot Thomas" (1974) "The Ash Tree" (1975), "The Signalman" (1976), "Stigma" (1977), "The Ice House" (1978), and "Number 13" as Ghost Stories for Christmas - Volume 2.
