= Cyril Appleton =

British actor (born 1930)

Cyril Appleton (born 31 May 1930) is a retired British stage, television and film actor whose acting career spanned four decades.

== Life and career ==
Appleton was born in St Helens in Lancashire in 1930. His first television role was Court Usher in the series Misleading Cases (1968), while from 1968 to 1969 he played 'Lofty' in the stage play Alfie at the Salisbury Playhouse.

Other film and television appearances include Smith in Dixon of Dock Green (1972), McKyle's Assistant in The Ruling Class (1972), Ferdinand's servant in The Duchess of Malfi (1972), Labourer in A Warning to the Curious (1972), Alf Burns/HP Man in Z-Cars (1972-1973), Borg in The Onedin Line (1973), Policeman and P.C. Henderson in three episodes of Billy Liar (1973-1974), Inspector Riley in Shoulder to Shoulder (1974), Sgt. Henderson in Special Branch Series 4 episode Jailbait (1974), Mr. Thomas/Peter Webb in two episodes of Softly, Softly: Task Force (1973-1974), Driver in Barlow at Large (1974), First Guest in Chinese Blues (1975), Count Malatesta in A Touch of the Casanovas (1975), Master Procathro in The Ash Tree (1975), Claudius in Further Up Pompeii! (1975), Scranowitz in Second Verdict (1976), Sergeant in The Howerd Confessions (1976), and Billy Dalby in All Creatures Great and Small (1978).

Appleton also played Jim Conran in Coronation Street (1978), Police Driver in Rough Cut (1980), Sgt. Hask in Blake's 7 (1981), Traffic Warden in The Missing Ring (1981), Mayor of Swinford in By the Sword Divided (1985), Medical Officer in Hitler's SS: Portrait in Evil (1985), Second Lawyer in Bleak House (1985), `Foxy' Rynaert in Pretorius (1987), Counsellor in Capital City (1989), Pub Landlord in Forever Green (1989), Harold in Lovejoy (1993), Clerk of the Court/Coroner's officer/Barman in The Bill (1991-1996) and Professor Crawford in McLibel! (1997).
