= Number 13 (short story) =

- Short story by M.R. James
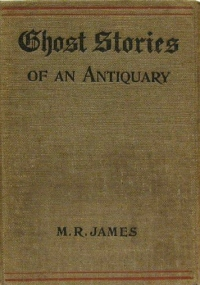
- "Number 13" was published in Ghost Stories of an Antiquary in 1904

Text available at Wikisource
- Country: United Kingdom
- Language: English
- Genre: Horror

Publication
- Publisher: Edward Arnold
- Publication date: 1904

"Number 13" is a ghost story by British writer M. R. James, included in his first collection Ghost Stories of an Antiquary (1904).

== Plot summary ==
While researching church history in Viborg, Denmark, in particular the events of the Reformation, the narrator's cousin Anderson stays in room Number 12 of a local inn, the Golden Lion. Once in his room, he notices how the space seems to grow smaller and his furniture sometimes vanishes. He hears dancing in the room next door, which he notices from its door marking is Number 13. However, upon discussing the matter with the innkeeper, he learns that there is no such room with that number in the Golden Lion, as it is considered bad luck.

Anderson asks the innkeeper to visit his room at night. While talking, both he and the innkeeper hear ominous singing in the room next door. They check Number 14, but learn that its occupant, Jensen, thought it was them. They then discover the door to Number 13, which Anderson had seen earlier. Suddenly, a clawed hand attacks them. The innkeeper and Anderson attempt to break down the door, only to break through a plaster wall. The occupants of 12 and 14 spend the night in a double bedded room.

The following morning, the innkeeper arranges for the floorboards of Number 12 next to the party wall with Number 14 to be lifted. Beneath the floor, they find a small copper box containing a vellum document. Somewhat anticlimactically, neither Anderson nor Jensen is able to interpret the writing on the document (suspecting it to be Latin or Old Danish), and they donate it to the Historical Society of Viborg.

Anderson meets his cousin near Uppsala a few months later, and relates the tale to him.

== Publication ==
James states that he wrote "Number 13" in 1899, though S. T. Joshi speculates it may in fact have been written in 1900 as James visited Viborg for the first time that year. In December 1903, James read the story at the King's College, Cambridge Christmas gathering. "Number 13" was first published in James' book Ghost-Stories of an Antiquary in 1904, and again in The Collected Ghost Stories of M. R. James in 1931. It has been anthologised many times.

== Reception ==
S. T. Joshi describes "Number 13" as an "ingenious tale [in which] the 'ghost' is not that of a person, but of a room."

Jane Mainley-Piddock notes that "Number 13" reflects "...a change in James's style, which both avoided the Victorian pitfalls of crude melodramatic sensationalism and 'satisfied the sophisticated modern taste'", with the "narrative distance" of James' earlier stories giving way to more tangible ghosts who physically touch the protagonists.

Daniel Frampton offers "Number 13" as an example of stories by James that "exhibit a supernaturally-charged reality that was 'terrifyingly alive'.", writing "[James'] ghosts are novel in that they are 'embodied terrors' that can be touched."

== Adaptations ==
On 7 September 1961, the American horror television series Great Ghost Tales on NBC broadcast an episode based on "Number 13" titled "Room 13" adapted by Philip H. Reisman Jr., directed by Lewis Freedman, and starring William Redfield and Diana Van der Vlis.

On 22 October 1966, the UK horror anthology television series Mystery and Imagination featured an adaptation of "Number 13" by Evelyn Frazer, "Room 13". The episode was directed by Patrick Dromgoole.

On 23 December 1975, BBC Radio 4 FM's Story Time programme featured an abridged version of "Number 13" by Neville Teller, read by Peter Barkworth. The Radio Times preview read "Three stupid mistakes in 12 hours were too much for a methodical, accurate-minded man, so he turned back to make sure. The next number to 14 was number 12, his own room. There was no number 13 at all!"

A dramatized narration of the story with Sir Christopher Lee as James was produced by BBC Scotland in 2000 as part of the series Christopher Lee's Ghost Stories For Christmas, adapted by Ronald Frame.

In 2006, the story was adapted for television as part of the BBC's A Ghost Story for Christmas, starring Greg Wise, Paul Freeman, Tom Burke and his father David Burke.

In 2007, BBC Radio 4 presented more M. R. James adaptations in the form of M.R. James at Christmas, a series of five plays in the Woman's Hour Drama slot. The stories adapted included "Number 13" with Julian Rhind-Tutt as Dr. Anderson. The plays were adapted by Chris Harrald and directed and produced by Gemma Jenkins. Each episode was introduced by Derek Jacobi as James himself.

April 2007, saw the release of Tales of the Supernatural, an audiobook presentation by Fantom Films, including "Number 13" read by Ian Fairbairn.

In 2012, Nunkie Theatre Company toured Count Magnus around the UK and Ireland. This one-man show was a retelling of two of James's tales, "Count Magnus" and "Number 13".
