= Geoffrey Burridge =

English actor (1948–1987)

- Born: 4 December 1948; London, England
- Died: 30 September 1987 (aged 38); London, England
- Partner(s): Alec McCowen (– 1987; his death)

Geoffrey Cecil Burridge (4 December 1948 – 30 September 1987) was an English actor known for his performances in theatre and television.

== Career ==
On television, Burridge appeared as Mark Proctor in early episodes of Emmerdale Farm and is also remembered for his guest appearance in Blake's 7 (as Dorian in the episode "Rescue").

In John Landis's 1981 film An American Werewolf in London, Burridge appeared as the undead murdered man with his fiancée in the sex cinema scene. He also appeared in the 1978 BBC TV drama by Derek Lister The Ice House as one of the main characters, Clovis and in the same year made a guest appearance in the series 1990 as American chess champion Cyrus Asher in the episode "You'll Never Walk Alone".

Burridge's extensive theatre credits included many musicals, notably the 1972 West End revue, Cowardy Custard, the 1978 production of Beyond the Rainbow in the West End and the 1985 revival of Gigi.

== Death ==
Burridge died in London from an AIDS-related illness in 1987, leaving a partner, the actor Alec McCowen, who threatened to withhold permission to broadcast his This Is Your Life episode unless the relationship was acknowledged, which was added as a voice-over at the end.

== Filmography ==
Year	Title	Role	Notes
1974	The Internecine Project	Floor manager	Uncredited
1981	An American Werewolf in London	Harry Berman	
