= Roger Milner =

British actor and author

Roger Lloyd Milner (2 April 1925–22 February 2014) was a British actor, author and dramatist who is probably best remembered today for appearing in two of the BBC’s A Ghost Story for Christmas dramas in the 1970s. His "outrageous comedy" How's the World Treating You? (1965) gave Patricia Routledge her West End début and her Broadway début when it transferred there in 1966.

== Early life and career ==
Born in Hexham in Northumberland to a clergyman father and an Irish mother, Milner attended St John's School, a school for the sons of clergymen in Leatherhead in Surrey. He joined the British Army in 1943 during World War II and served in India, being commissioned as a 2nd Lieutenant in May 1945. After the War he trained at the Royal Academy of Dramatic Art (RADA) where he graduated with an Acting Diploma in 1948.

He next attended The Old Vic theatre school where he practised honing his writing skills. His first professional acting role was with the Midland Theatre Company in Coventry, while his first known television role was as a Sentry in two episodes of the drama Clementina (1954). He was Lieutenant in the BBC television production of A Man for All Seasons (1957) with Bernard Hepton in the title role.

Milner's first drama, Reward in Heaven, was produced at the Sheffield Playhouse in 1958. In 1959 he played Uncle in Television for Children, and in the same year he married the actress Carol Snape (1934-2018) at Ryton, Shropshire. The couple had three sons, Jack, Richard and Henry. He wrote the screenplay for the film The Queen's Guards (1961), directed by Michael Powell. Powell sold the story to 20th Century Fox and the Queen gave her permission to film the Trooping of the Colour. Powell liked Milner, but said he was "more a sketch artist than a full blown dramatist" and "our collaboration was uneasy." He later said the film was "a broken backed feature when it should have been a family saga and an epic of military glory... We shouldn't have tried to compete with A. E. W. Mason."

Milner's next play, the outrageous comedy How's the World Treating You? (1965), was first performed at the New Arts Theatre Club before transferring to Wyndham's Theatre and then to the Comedy Theatre. It opened at the Music Box Theatre in New York starring Patricia Routledge, Peter Bayliss and James Bolam. Philip Grout, the play's director, said that the cast was "helpless with laughter [and] unable to speak for several minutes" during the play’s first read-through. The critic for The Times wrote that, except for the third act, the play "... is one of the funniest, best directed, best acted and most sharply timed comedies ever seen in Hampstead". In 1965 Milner played J. G. Henshaw in "The Murder Market", an episode of The Avengers.

His play The Upper Crust (1968) played at the Intimate Theatre in Palmers Green and was directed by Donald Sinden and with performances by Penelope Keith and Gwen Watford. In June 1970 with his wife Carol Snape he acted in the BBC Radio 4 Afternoon Theatre broadcast Modest Old Chester. His next stage drama, My Family Came Over with the Normans (1972), a play about social class, premiered at the Perth Theatre. 1976 saw his You'll Never Be Another Michael Angelo open at the Hampstead Theatre Club, with the critic of The Stage describing it as "a sense of muddle, shot through with intelligence and invention".

== Career change ==
During this period of great success Milner was seriously injured in a car accident which left him with life threatening injuries. However, he survived but the accident seems to have affected his confidence in his writing skills and undermined the inventiveness of his comedy. Unable to write and with children to support Milner returned to acting, taking such roles on television as the antique shop owner in A Warning to the Curious (1972), and the clergyman in Lost Hearts (1973), both part of the A Ghost Story for Christmas strand for the BBC; Mortimer Brown, a photographer, in the three-part story, ' The Doll ', (1975); Ticket Collector in Raven (1977); the Rev. Barnwell in Penmarric (1979); the Rev. Francis Chaffney in Prince Regent (1979); as Wilcox the butler in Brideshead Revisited (1981), playing opposite two of his acting heroes, John Gielgud and Laurence Olivier. He appeared as Anicca in the Doctor Who episode 'Kinda' (1982); as Solomon Gills in the mini-series Dombey and Son (1983); as Henry Herewith in the children's comedy All Change (1989-1991) opposite Frankie Howerd; the Headmaster in Dark Season (1991), and Pratt in Middlemarch (1994).

== Stage appearances ==
His stage appearances included The School for Wives at the Sheffield Playhouse (October 1955); Foigard in The Beaux' Stratagem (June – July 1957) at the Birmingham Repertory Theatre; Len in The Real McCoy (August 1964) at the Sheffield Playhouse; Bus Driver/Bus Conductor in Flibberty and the Penguin (December 1971 – January 1972) at the Swan Theatre in Worcester; Scruple in The Recruiting Officer (April 1972) at the Birmingham Repertory Theatre; Badger in Toad of Toad Hall (December 1975 – January 1976) at the Birmingham Repertory Theatre; Greville William Allnutt in a national tour of For the West for the English Stage Company (started 11 May 1977) and playing at the National Theatre, in London and the Royal Court Theatre (Upstairs) in London, among other venues; and Graaberg in The Wild Duck (1980 – 1981) at the Lyric Theatre in Hammersmith.

== Later works ==
Eventually, Milner regained confidence in his writing ability and resumed writing dramas, working with the television producer Innes Lloyd from the BBC on PQ17 (1981) concerning how during just one week in World War II 24 British merchant ships were sunk in the Arctic. He played Admiral Naismith in the production.

Other later works penned by Milner included several biographies, including Reith (1983), a biography about the founder of the BBC, Lord Reith; Amy (1984), was about Amy Johnson, the pioneering English pilot who was the first woman to fly solo from London to Australia and who disappeared during a ferry flight. The television film Across the Lake (1988) saw Anthony Hopkins play Donald Campbell, the British speed record breaker who broke eight absolute world speed records on water and on land in the 1950s and 1960s. The film followed the last sixty days in the life of Campbell.

Roger Milner died in February 2014 in Aylesbury in Buckinghamshire aged 89.
