= Bernard Lloyd =

Welsh actor (1934–2018)

- Born: 30 January 1934; Newport, Wales
- Died: 12 December 2018 (aged 84); Watford, Hertfordshire, England
- Occupation: Actor

Bernard Lloyd (30 January 1934 – 12 December 2018) was a Welsh actor.

== Early life ==
After attending the University College of North Staffordshire (from 1962 Keele University) Lloyd attended the Royal Academy of Dramatic Art and performed with the Royal Shakespeare Company. His surname was Gibbons but he changed it to Lloyd for professional purposes, to avoid being confused with another actor of the same name.

== Career ==
Lloyd began his television career in Redcap in 1965. He played William Holman Hunt in the 1975 Pre-Raphaelite Brotherhood drama The Love School and the Traveller, the man who tries to unravel signalman Denholm Elliott's predicament, in the 1976 Ghost Story for Christmas, The Signalman, based on the short story by Charles Dickens. His other roles included Hitler's SS: Portrait in Evil, Inspector Morse, Agatha Christie's Poirot and Lewis. He also performed as Jacob Marley's ghost in the 1999 television film adaptation of A Christmas Carol. In 2009 he played the role of the archbishop in the feature film The Young Victoria.

== Filmography ==
Year	Title	Role	Notes
1963	The Spread of the Eagle	Various Roles	TV series
1964	The Barnstormers	Eddie	TV series
1964	Redcap	Sergeant Jones	TV series
1965	Emergency Ward 10	Nicholas Girard	TV series
1966	A Farewell to Arms	Police Major	TV series
1966	Mr. John Jorrocks	Charley Stobbs	TV series
1967	No Hiding Place	Wallis	TV series
1975	The Love School	Holman Hunt	Tv series
1976	Ghost Story for Christmas	The Traveler	Episode : The Signalman
1985	Hitler's S.S.: Portrait in Evil	Sepp Dietrich	TV movie
1985–1986	Lytton's Diary	Henry Field	TV series
1989	Inspector Morse	Professor Edward Ullman	TV series
1992	A Dangerous Man: Lawrence After Arabia	Lloyd George	TV movie
1995	Agatha Christie's Poirot	Andrew Greive	Tv series
1995-2008	Casualty	Rev. Souglas Gilbert and Joe Geragh	Tv series
1998	Coronation Street	HHJ Yeomans	TV series
1999	A Christmas Carol	Marley's Ghost	TV movie
2009	Trial & Retribution	Pops Gilbert	Tv series
2009	The Young Victoria	Archbishop of Canterbury	
2010	Lewis	Ted Tample	Tv series
2011	Midsomer Murders	Simion Langton	Tv series
