= Paul Lavers =

British film, television and stage actor (born 1950)

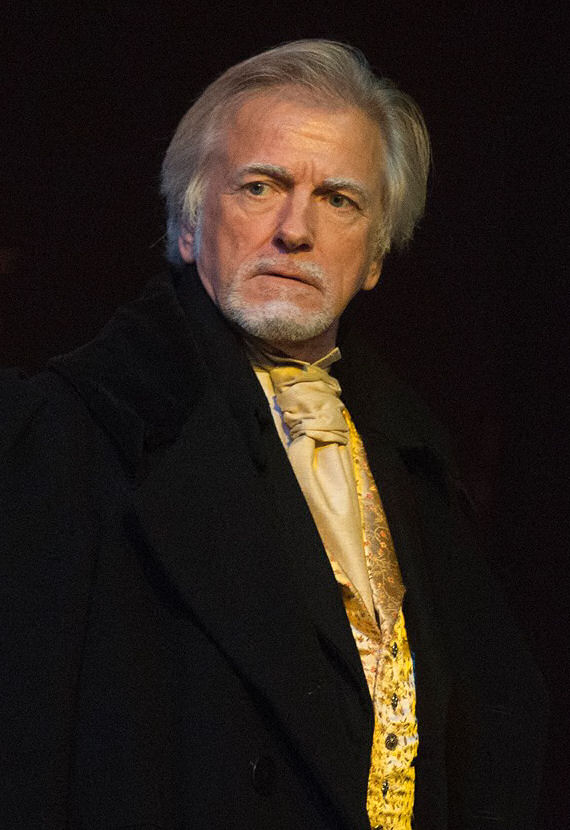
- Paul Lavers in 2014
- Born: 16 April 1950 (age 76); Bristol, UK
- Occupations: Actor and presenter
- Years active: 1972–present
- Spouses: Monica Garvey (m. 1973, divorced) Érin Geraghty (m. 1980)
- Website: www.paullavers.com

Paul Lavers (born 1950) is a British film, television and stage actor. He has been a presenter for Anglia Television and for several shopping channels.

== Early life and career ==
Paul Lavers was born in Bristol in 1950, the son of Josephine (née Richards) and Frank Lavers. He was born with an esophageal condition that prevented him from eating solid food, and underwent surgery at 16 to repair it.

Lavers gained his first acting experience while attending St. Brendan's College in Bristol. For about three years from the age of 11 he had a role in the BBC Radio Children's’ serial The Adventures of Clara Chuff. On leaving St. Brendan's Lavers trained at the Bristol Old Vic Theatre School where a fellow student was Pete Postlethwaite. While a student here Lavers appeared in As You Like It (1969-1970), Three Sisters (1969-1970), The Friend (1971-1972) and The Workhouse Donkey (1971-1972), all at the Bristol Old Vic.

On leaving drama school he appeared as David Teal in an episode of The Onedin Line (1972) following which he had a season at the Library Theatre in Manchester. Lavers appeared in She Stoops to Conquer (1973–1974) at the Little Theatre, Bristol, Jumpers (1973–1974), Vivat! Vivat Regina! (1973-1974), and Othello (1973-1974), all at the Bristol Old Vic. He played Lord Dattering in The Treasure of Abbot Thomas (1974), one of the BBC A Ghost Story for Christmas series, going on to play opposite Julia Foster as her first husband in the BBC dramatization of Moll Flanders (1975).

For Yorkshire Television Lavers played James Lamert in Dickens of London (1976) and Aspinall in an episode of the BBC drama When the Boat Comes In (1976). He appeared in The Blue Poster for Norway TV, starred as Jack Worthing at Westcliff Palace Theatre in The Importance of Being Earnest and then appeared at the Haymarket Theatre in Leicester in She Stoops to Conquer. In 1977 he played the Infantry Major in Wings, and after playing Farrah in the Doctor Who story The Androids of Tara (1978) he spent three months at the English Theatre in Vienna playing Algernon in The Importance of Being Earnest. In 1978 he played Harvey in Wilde Alliance and the Doctor in You're Only Young Twice, while in 1979 he returned to The Onedin Line, this time as Francis Polter.

== Presenting ==
In 1980 he played Selwyn in Love in a Cold Climate, and in 1981 he appeared as Cynon in the children's series Into the Labyrinth. When the acting roles dried up, and needing to support his young family, Lavers took a job in the Youth Training Scheme as a tutor in the theatre course. From 1984 to 1993 he was a presenter for Anglia television, when, as 'Mr. Midnight' he appeared throughout the night introducing programmes until the early hours.

In 1993 Paul started working for home shopping channels. He was at QVC from 1993 to 2000 and then moved to Ideal World in 2000.

While working for Friendly TV in 2003, Lavers inadvertently broadcast a rumour that he believed Nicole Kidman to be gay, after his microphone was left open during a commercial break. The presenters apologised when they learned that this had been accidentally broadcast.

In 2005 Lavers was briefly a presenter on the shopping channels OneTV and iBuy.

== Recent acting career ==
For German TV Lavers appeared in Rosamunde Pilcher: Entscheidung des Herzens (2009), and in 2012 he played the Dame in the pantomime Mother Goose at the Pavilion Theatre in Gorleston alongside his former Anglia television colleague Helen McDermott. In 2014 he appeared as the Invigilator in Doctors and in the same year he played King Pomposity in the pantomime Jack and the Beanstalk at the Theatre Royal in Lincoln, and Lyman Wyeth in Other Desert Cities at the English Theatre in Vienna. In 2016 he appeared in two television ads for Haribo.

From March to May 2016 Lavers appeared in Les Blancs at the National Theatre while in June 2016 he appeared with the Theatre Royal Summer Repertory Theatre in Windsor as Charlie Clench in One Man, Two Guvnors and Doctor Maurice Young in Deadly Nightcap. In October 2016 he appeared opposite his wife Érin Geraghty in a production of Bedroom Farce at the Gordon Craig Theatre in Stevenage. In May 2018 he returned to the Gordon Craig Theatre as Rod Trusser in Alan Ayckbourn's Neighbourhood Watch and in November the same year he appeared as Harvey in Ayckbourn's Season's Greetings at the same venue.

Lavers played Sultan Mustaffa-Biscuit in the pantomime Aladdin at the Hartlepool Town Hall Theatre in December 2016.

In 2020 Lavers played Admiral von Schreiber in a UK and Ireland tour of The Sound of Music. Venues visited include Dublin, Derry, Sunderland, Blackpool, Bradford, Wolverhampton, Woking, Milton Keynes, Crawley, Eastbourne, Sheffield and Chester.

In 2022 he toured with Patrick Duffy and Linda Purl in a stage version of Catch Me If You Can.

== Film roles ==
Lavers' film roles include: Anaesthetist in The Pump (1980), Felton Matthew in This Living Hand (1981), Rodney Connors in Photo Shoot (2009), Highlight News anchor in SuperBob (2015), Mr Dunne in The Adventurer: The Curse of the Midas Box (2014), and Priest in the Bollywood film Housefull 3 (2016).

== Personal life ==
During an early 1970s season at the Library Theatre in Manchester, he met his first wife, Monica Garvey, whom he married in 1973. The couple had two sons. The marriage was later dissolved. In 1980 Lavers married his second wife, actress Érin Geraghty. with whom he had triplet daughters.
