= Ghost Stories of an Antiquary =

First book of ghost stories by M.R. James

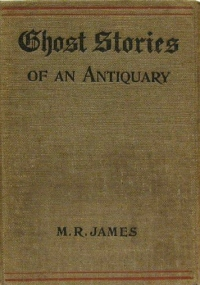
- First edition cover
- Author: M. R. James
- Language: English
- Genre: Horror short stories
- Publisher: Edward Arnold
- Publication date: 1904
- Publication place: UK
- Media type: Print (hardback)
- Followed by: More Ghost Stories of an Antiquary

Ghost Stories of an Antiquary is a collection of ghost stories by British writer M. R. James, published in 1904 (some had previously appeared in magazines). Some later editions under this title contain both the original collection and its successor, More Ghost Stories of an Antiquary (1911), combined in one volume.

It was his first short story collection.

== Contents of the original edition ==
- "Canon Alberic's Scrap-Book"
- "Lost Hearts"
- "The Mezzotint"
- "The Ash-tree"
- "Number 13"
- "Count Magnus"
- "'Oh, Whistle, and I'll Come to You, My Lad'"
- "The Treasure of Abbot Thomas"

== Illustrations ==
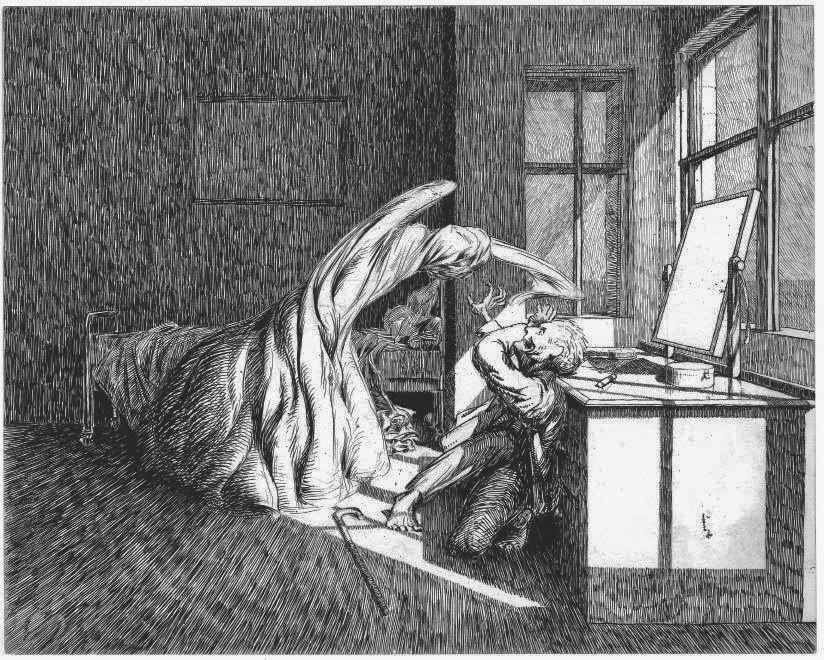
"It leapt towards him upon the instant". An illustration from the first edition of Ghost Stories of an Antiquary by James McBryde, which accompanied "'Oh, Whistle, and I'll Come to You, My Lad'".

James' friend James McBryde produced four black and white plates to illustrate James' stories: two for "Canon Alberic's Scrap-Book" and two for "'Oh, Whistle, and I'll Come to You, My Lad'". In May 1904, McBryde wrote to James "I don’t think I have ever done anything I liked better than illustrating your stories. To begin with I sat down and learned advanced perspective and the laws of shadows". McBryde had intended to produce more illustrations, but died abruptly on 5 June 1904 at the age of 30 from complications of an appendectomy. The illustrations were included in the first edition of Ghost Stories of an Antiquary; James' publisher offered to employ an alternative illustrator, suggesting Henry Justice Ford, but James opted to use only the four illustrations McBryde had produced as a tribute to him, saying "Those who knew the artist will understand how much I wished to give a permanent form even to a fragment of his work [...] Others will appreciate the fact that here a remembrance is made of one in whom many friendships centred." S. T. Joshi suggests that McBryde's death may have encouraged James to publish his stories in a book. Discussing McBryde's second illustration for "'Oh, Whistle, and I'll Come to You, My Lad'" in The Spectator, Robert Lloyd-Parry wrote "McBryde captures perfectly the bleak atmosphere of the tale and stark terror of its finale."

== Reception ==
A. M. Burrage praised Ghost Stories of an Antiquary and its successor, More Ghost Stories of an Antiquary as "two really admirable books of ghost stories". Burrage also described "'Oh, Whistle, and I'll Come to You, My Lad'" as "a real gem". Henry S. Whitehead also lauded the book: "Ghost Stories of an Antiquary and its two successors with similar titles have rarely if ever been surpassed in the peculiarly thrilling field which that wonderful writer has made his own."

== Adaptations ==
After Jonathan Miller adapted "'Oh, Whistle, and I'll Come to You, My Lad'" for the BBC's Omnibus series in 1968, several stories from the collection were adapted as the BBC's yearly Ghost Story for Christmas strand, including "Lost Hearts", "The Treasure of Abbot Thomas", "The Ash-tree", and "Number 13". "Whistle and I'll Come to You" was also remade (heavily adapted by Neil Cross) for broadcast on Christmas Eve 2010. Mark Gatiss wrote and directed adaptations of "The Mezzotint" and "Count Magnus" for the Ghost Story for Christmas series in 2021 and 2022 respectively.
