= Lawrence Gordon Clark =

English television director and producer

- Born: 15 June 1938 (age 88)
- Occupations: Television director, Television producer, Screenwriter, Author
- Years active: 1964–present
- Notable work: A Ghost Story for Christmas, Casting the Runes
- Website: https://www.lawrencegordonclark.com/

Lawrence Gordon Clark is an English television director and producer, screenwriter, and author, best known for creating the supernatural anthology series A Ghost Story for Christmas, which originally aired on BBC One from 1971–1978, with Clark directing all but the final instalment as well as writing and producing the first two, The Stalls of Barchester (1971) and A Warning to the Curious (1972). The first five of these were based on the ghost stories of M. R. James, as was Casting the Runes (1979) which he directed for the ITV drama anthology series Playhouse.

He began his career in documentary at the BBC, directing episodes of the series The Human Side (1964–1965) and Six Sides of a Square (1966) before being inspired by Jonathan Miller's Whistle and I'll Come to You (1968) to create A Ghost Story for Christmas. His other directing credits include the miniseries Harry's Game (1982) and Jamaica Inn (1983), A Pattern of Roses (1983), two TV movies in the espionage series Frederick Forsyth Presents (1989–1990), and episodes of Flambards, Casualty, Pie in the Sky, and Dangerfield.

A collection of Clark's original short stories entitled Telling Stories was published late 2011 by Avalard Publishing.

For his work on A Ghost Story for Christmas, Clark is regarded as one of the greatest British horror directors. Additionally, he has been described as an auteur for his level of creative control on the first two instalments and for setting the standard of the series being shot entirely on location on 16mm film.

Clark was interviewed by Mark Gatiss for a 2013 BBC programme about M.R. James: 'M R James: Ghost Writer'.
