= Supernatural film =

Film genre

Supernatural film is a film genre that encompasses supernatural themes related to gods, goddesses, ghosts, apparitions, spirits, miracles, and other extraordinary phenomena. These themes are often blended with other film genres, such as comedy, science fiction, fantasy, action, mystery and horror. Historically, the primary goal of supernatural films was not to terrify audiences but to offer entertainment, often in whimsical or romantic contexts.

The film genre is part of several hybrid genres, including supernatural comedy films, supernatural horror films, supernatural religious films, and supernatural thriller films.

== Early depictions: Films with benevolent ghosts ==
Ghosts in cinema date back to the era of World War II, with post-war romantic comedies frequently featuring apparitions. Initially, these supernatural entities were portrayed more as entertainers rather than frighteners.

Notable examples include:

- Topper (1937)
- Topper Takes a Trip (1937)
- Topper Returns (1941)
- Here Comes Mr. Jordan (1941)
- I Married a Witch (1942)
- Heaven Can Wait (1943)
- Blithe Spirit (1945)
- Wonder Man (1945)
- It's a Wonderful Life (1946)
- The Bishop's Wife (1947)
- The Ghost and Mrs. Muir (1947)

== Horror and the supernatural ==
By the mid-1940s, the narrative began to shift, portraying ghosts and the supernatural in more sinister contexts.

- Cat People (1942)
- The Curse of the Cat People (1944)
- The Uninvited (1944)
- Dead of Night (1945)
- The Picture of Dorian Gray (1945)

== Spiritual and religious themes in the 1940s ==
Some films from this era merged the ideas of religion and the supernatural.

- The Devil and Daniel Webster (1941)
- A Guy Named Joe (1944)
- The Enchanted Cottage (1944)
- Angel on My Shoulder (1946)
- Portrait of Jennie (1948)

== 1950s to 1970s: Low-budget films ==
The late 1950s through the 1970s witnessed a surge of low-budget supernatural/horror films.

- Bell, Book and Candle (1958)
- House on Haunted Hill (1959)
- 13 Ghosts (1960)
- The Innocents (1961)
- Carnival of Souls (1962)
- The Haunting (1963)
- The Legend of Hell House (1973)
- The Fog (1980)

== 1980s and onward ==
During the 1980s and beyond, ghost stories continued to evolve and appeal to the masses.

- The Changeling (1980)
- The Shining (1980)
- Ghost Story (1981)
- Poltergeist (1982)
- Ghostbusters (1984)
- The Wraith (1986)
- Retribution (1987)
- The Witches of Eastwick (1987)
- Lady in White (1988)
- Ghost (1990)
- Hocus Pocus (1993)
- Casper (1995)
- The Craft (1996)
