= A Ghost Story for Christmas =

British television series

- Title screen of The Signalman, the 1976 adaptation. Because this was the first non-James story, the strand's title appears on screen for the first time.
- Created by: Lawrence Gordon Clark
- Country of origin: United Kingdom
- No. of episodes: 19

Production
- Running time: 30–50 minutes

Original release
- Network: BBC1
- Release: 24 December 1971 – 25 December 1978
- Network: BBC4
- Release: 23 December 2005 – 22 December 2006
- Network: BBC2
- Release: 24 December 2010 – 24 December 2013
- Network: BBC4
- Release: 24 December 2018 – 24 December 2019
- Network: BBC2
- Release: 24 December 2021 – present

A Ghost Story for Christmas is a strand of annual British short television films originally broadcast on BBC One between 1971 and 1978, and revived sporadically by the BBC since 2005. With one exception, the original instalments were directed by Lawrence Gordon Clark and the films were all shot on 16 mm colour film. The remit behind the series was to provide a television adaptation of a classic ghost story, in line with the oral tradition of telling supernatural tales at Christmas.

Each instalment is a separate adaptation of a short story, ranges between 30 and 50 minutes in duration, and features well-known British actors such as Clive Swift, Robert Hardy, Peter Vaughan, Edward Petherbridge and Denholm Elliott. The first five are adaptations of ghost stories by M. R. James, the sixth is based on a short story by Charles Dickens, and the last two instalments from the 1970s are original screenplays by Clive Exton and John Bowen respectively. Although the strand (or series) was titled A Ghost Story for Christmas in listings such as the Radio Times (followed by the title of the individual story being shown), the strand title did not actually appear on screen until The Signalman in 1976.

An earlier black-and-white adaptation of M. R. James's "'Oh, Whistle, and I'll Come to You, My Lad'", directed by Jonathan Miller and shown as part of the series Omnibus in 1968, is often cited as an influence upon the production of the films, and is sometimes included as part of the series. The series was revived by the BBC in 2005 with a new set of ongoing adaptations helmed mostly by Mark Gatiss. These were produced sporadically rather than annually, although a new production has been broadcast each year since 2018 with the exception of 2020.

== Production ==
=== Background ===
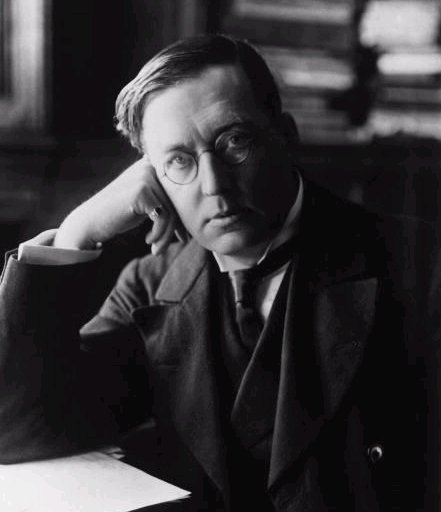
M. R. James in about 1900

The first five films are adaptations of stories from the four books by M. R. James, published between 1904 and 1925. The ghost stories of James, an English mediaeval scholar and Provost of Eton College and King's College, Cambridge, were originally narrated as Christmas entertainments to friends and selected students.

The sixth film, The Signalman, is an adaptation of a story by Charles Dickens published in his magazine All the Year Round in 1866. In its original context, it was one of eight stories set around the fictional Mugby Junction and its branch lines. It was inspired by the Staplehurst rail crash of June 1865, which Dickens himself survived, having attended to dying fellow passengers. He subsequently suffered panic disorders and flashbacks as a result.

The final two stories were based on original screenplays, one by Clive Exton, who was an experienced television screenwriter, and the other by John Bowen, who was primarily known as a novelist and playwright, but also had extensive television experience, including adapting "The Treasure of Abbot Thomas" earlier in the series.

=== Filming ===
Lawrence Gordon Clark had made his name as a BBC documentary director during the 1960s. The Stalls of Barchester was the first dramatic production he directed. Clark recalled in an interview for the BFI's DVD release in 2012 that "the BBC at that time gave you the space to fail, and generously so too. They backed you up with marvellous technicians, art departments, film departments, and so forth."

I was itching to move into drama and knew I had exactly the source material I wanted. I'd discovered M.R. James at boarding school and loved him. So I met with Paul Fox, who was at the time Controller of BBC1. I brought a copy of M.R. James's Ghost Stories with me, with a bookmark stuck in "The Stalls of Barchester Cathedral". The fact that period drama always has been very popular at the BBC probably helped.

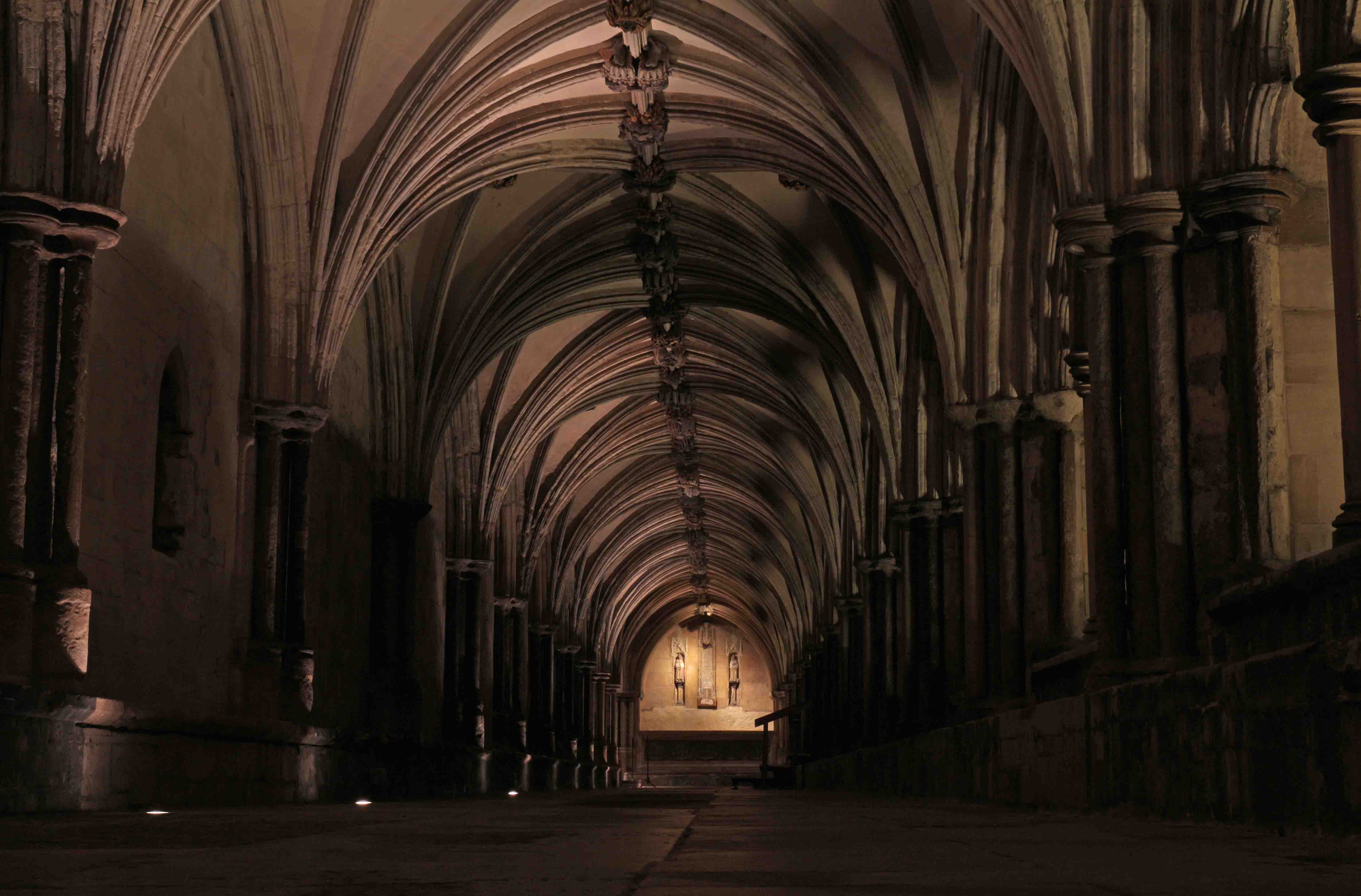
Norwich Cathedral cloister, a location in The Stalls of Barchester.

Clark recalls that "Paul Fox gave us a tiny budget ... and we set out to do a full-blooded drama on location. Budgets were really tiny, and we shot for ten days and brought the film in for about 8,000 pounds." Unusually for a BBC television drama of the 1970s, each instalment was filmed entirely on location using 16 mm film. As a result, the cameraman John McGlashan, who filmed the first five adaptations, was able to make use of night shoots and dark, shadowy interiors, which would not have been possible with the then-standard video-based studio interiors. Clark notes that McGlashan, and the sound recordist Dick Manton's contribution to the series "was every bit as great as mine".

In an interview in 1995, Clark said that the stories "focus on suggestion. The aim, they say, is to chill rather than shock. Partly because television is not best suited to carrying off big-screen pyrotechnics, but mainly because they want to keep faith with the notion of a ghost story in its literary rather than cinematic tradition." Helen Wheatley notes that the best adaptations maintain the stories' "sense of decorum and restraint, ... withholding the full revelation of the supernatural until the very last moment, and centring on the suggestion of a ghostly presence rather than the horror of visceral excess and abjection." Clark noted in a 2014 interview that he tried to make the second adaptation, A Warning to the Curious as "essentially, a silent film, with the tension building slowly throughout the visual images". After the success of the first two low-budget adaptations which had been largely independently produced by Clark, the stories came under the wing of the BBC's Drama Department, with a new producer, Rosemary Hill, and an increased budget.

=== Adaptation ===
The adaptations, although remaining true to the spirit of M.R. James, make alterations to suit the small screen - for example, A Warning to the Curious avoids the convoluted plot structure of M. R. James's original, opting for a more linear construction and reducing the number of narrators. In addition, the central character, Paxton, is changed from a young, fair-haired innocent who stumbles across the treasure to a middle-aged character driven by poverty to seek the treasure and acting in full awareness of what he is doing. After the first two adaptations, both by Clark, the tales were adapted by a number of playwrights and screenwriters. For The Treasure of Abbot Thomas, Clark recalls John Bowen's script "took some liberties with the story—which made it for the better I think...It's really quite a funny story until it gets nasty, although the threat is always there. James has a mordant sense of humour, and it's good to translate that into cinematic terms when you can. I'd always wanted to do a medium scene, and John came up with a beauty."

Clark is less complimentary of the adaptation of The Ash Tree, which he felt didn't make Mistress Mothersole an effective villain, as a result of both his and adaptor David Rudkin's sympathy for witch trial victims; "We know so much about the hysteria of the witch trials and the ignorance and downright evil that fueled them that it was well-nigh impossible to portray her as James intended. Although, even he makes her a complicated character, hinting that she was popular with local farmers and the pagan fertility aspects that this implies. Frankly, I don't think the script quite did justice to the story, and maybe someone else should have a go at it."

In his screenplay for The Signalman Andrew Davies adds scenes of the traveller's nightmare-plagued nights at an inn, and reinforces the ambiguity of the traveller-narrator by restructuring the ending and matching his facial features with those of the spectre. The film also makes use of visual and aural devices. For example, the appearance of the spectre is stressed by the vibrations of a bell in the signalbox and a recurring red motif connects the signalman's memories of a train crash with the danger light attended by a ghostly figure.

Clark's final Ghost Story for Christmas, Stigma, was an original story by Clive Exton filmed around the stone circles at Avebury, Wiltshire. He had wanted to film James' "Count Magnus", the teleplay of which had been written by Basil Copper, but was unable to obtain the budget. Although he felt the substitute film was "effective", Clark had by this time left the BBC to go freelance, joining Yorkshire Television, where he and Exton made another James adaptation Casting the Runes in 1979.

=== Locations ===
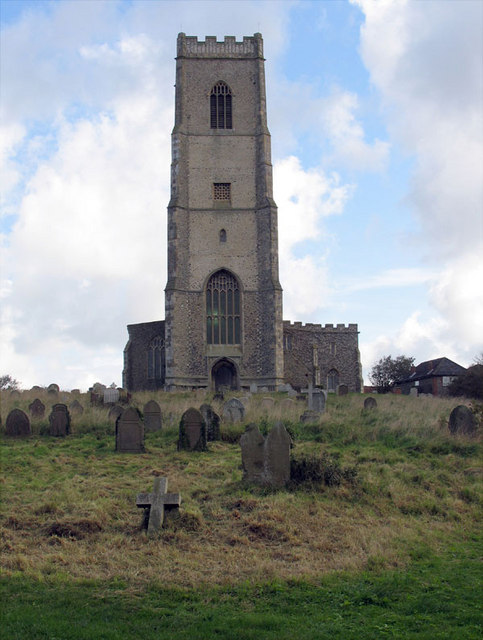
"It is a fine porch, isn't it?" St Mary's Church in Happisburgh, Norfolk, a film location in A Warning to the Curious.

The filming of the adaptations took place at a variety of locations. Clark notes that James gave him "a wonderful excuse to discover...places where you could best impart tension and atmosphere." East Anglia, where M. R. James set many of his stories, was the location for the two first films. The Stalls of Barchester was filmed at Norwich Cathedral and in the surrounding close. For A Warning to the Curious, "Seaburgh" (a disguised version of Aldeburgh, Suffolk) was filmed on the coast of North Norfolk at Waxham, Holkham Gap, Happisburgh, Wells-next-the-Sea and on the North Norfolk Railway. Clark recalls filming in North Norfolk in late February, with consistently fine cold weather "with a slight winter haze which gave exactly the right depth and sense of mystery to the limitless vistas of the shoreline there."

Later locations include Ormsby Hall and the Pelham Mausoleum at Brocklesby, Lincolnshire for Lost Hearts, Wells Cathedral, the Orchardleigh Estate, Frome and its 13th century church for The Treasure of Abbot Thomas, Prideaux Place near Padstow for The Ash-Tree and the Severn Valley Railway near Kidderminster for The Signalman. For The Signalman, a replica Great Western Railway signal box was erected in the cutting on the Kidderminster side of Bewdley Tunnel, and Highley signal box was used for the interior shots.

=== Music ===
Adam Scovell, analysing the aural aesthetics of the BBC Ghost Stories, notes that although Clark talks about "stock music", the early adaptations make use of what were then new, avant-garde classical works found in the BBC's gramophone library at Egton House - A Warning to the Curious uses György Ligeti's Atmosphères (1961) and Cello Concerto (1966) to signify the appearance of the ghost of William Ager, and the high, meandering flute part of another contemporary work, Edgard Varèse's Density 21.5 for Solo Flute (1936, revised 1946) is used in both this film and Lost Hearts.

Lost Hearts also makes use of Ralph Vaughan Williams's English Folk Song Suite and the hurdy-gurdy music of the ghostly Italian boy, who plays the tune L'amour De Moi. The Treasure of Abbot Thomas was the only entry in the series to have its own original score. Geoffrey Burgon's score consists of an organ, two countertenors and various unconventional percussion instruments; according to Clark, a "mixture of evensong and bicycle chains".

== Films ==
=== Original run (1971–1978) ===
With the exception of the final film, the tales were directed by Lawrence Gordon Clark. The final episode was directed by Derek Lister.

No.	Title	Directed by	Written by	Based on	Original release date	Main cast
1	The Stalls of Barchester	Lawrence Gordon Clark	Lawrence Gordon Clark	"The Stalls of Barchester Cathedral" by M. R. James	24 December 1971	Robert Hardy, Clive Swift, Thelma Barlow, Erik Chitty
An ambitious cleric murders an aged Archdeacon at Barchester Cathedral. However, he is soon stalked by a sinister black cat and by a hooded figure, both of whom seem to be embodiments of carvings on the cathedral's choir stalls.
2	A Warning to the Curious	Lawrence Gordon Clark	Lawrence Gordon Clark	"A Warning to the Curious" by M. R. James	24 December 1972	Peter Vaughan, Clive Swift, Roger Milner, Gilly Fraser
An amateur archaeologist travels to a remote seaside town in Norfolk to search for the lost crown of Anglia, but after unearthing it he is haunted by a mysterious figure.
3	Lost Hearts	Lawrence Gordon Clark	Robin Chapman	"Lost Hearts" by M. R. James	25 December 1973	Simon Gipps-Kent, Joseph O'Conor, James Mellor, Roger Milner
An orphan moves into the house of his older cousin, but is disturbed by visions of a pair of ghostly children. Is their message a warning to be fearful of his cousin's obsession with immortality?
4	The Treasure of Abbot Thomas	Lawrence Gordon Clark	John Bowen	"The Treasure of Abbot Thomas" by M. R. James	23 December 1974	Michael Bryant, Paul Lavers, Frank Mills, Sheila Dunn, John Herrington
A respected mediaeval historian and his protégé unearth clues to find the hidden treasure of a disgraced monk in an abbey library. Should he have heeded his own advice not to go treasure-hunting?
5	The Ash Tree	Lawrence Gordon Clark	David Rudkin	"The Ash-tree" by M. R. James	23 December 1975	Edward Petherbridge, Barbara Ewing, Preston Lockwood, Lalla Ward, Lucy Griffiths, Oliver Maguire
An aristocrat inherits his family estate and is haunted by visions of his ancestor's role in a witchcraft trial.
6	The Signalman	Lawrence Gordon Clark	Andrew Davies	"The Signal-Man" by Charles Dickens	22 December 1976	Denholm Elliott, Bernard Lloyd, Reginald Jessup, Carina Wyeth
A railway signalman tells a curious traveller how he is being troubled by a spectre that seems to predict calamity.
7	Stigma	Lawrence Gordon Clark	Clive Exton	–	28 December 1977	Kate Binchy, Peter Bowles, Jon Laurimore, John Judd
After a young couple move into a remote country house in the middle of a stone circle workmen disturb an ancient menhir, unleashing a supernatural force.
8	The Ice House	Derek Lister	John Bowen	–	25 December 1978	John Stride, Geoffrey Burridge, Elizabeth Romilly, Gladys Spencer
Residents at a health spa begin to suspect that a strange flower growing in an old ice house in the grounds may be the cause of a series of misfortunes.

=== Revival (2005–present) ===
BBC Four revisited the series at Christmas 2004, and in 2005 began to produce new adaptations of stories by M. R. James, broadcast along with repeats of episodes from the original series. BBC Two premiered a new adaptation by Neil Cross of M. R. James's "'Oh, Whistle, and I'll Come to You, My Lad'" on Christmas Eve 2010.

Mark Gatiss' adaptation of "The Tractate Middoth", another story by M. R. James, was broadcast on BBC Two on Christmas Day 2013. This was followed by a documentary, M. R. James: Ghost Writer.

An original tale written and directed by Gatiss, entitled The Dead Room, was broadcast on BBC Four on Christmas Eve 2018. Gatiss adapted and directed another James story, "Martin's Close", in 2019, again for BBC Four. This was followed by his third M.R. James adaptation, "The Mezzotint", for BBC Two in 2021, and his fourth, "Count Magnus", in 2022. Continuing with BBC Two, he then changed course, adapting an Arthur Conan Doyle story in 2023 and one by Edith Nesbit in 2024.

No.	Title	Directed by	Written by	Based on	Original release date	Main cast
9	A View from a Hill	Luke Watson	Peter Harness	"A View from a Hill" by M. R. James	23 December 2005	Mark Letheren, Pip Torrens, David Burke
An archaeologist has a disturbing experience after borrowing a pair of binoculars belonging to an outcast local historian and venturing up a notorious landmark.
10	Number 13	Pier Wilkie	Justin Hopper	"Number 13" by M. R. James	22 December 2006	Greg Wise, Paul Freeman, David Burke, Charlotte Comer, Anton Saunders
An academic researcher repudiates local superstitions surrounding a devilish house in a cathedral city. However, repeated visions and noises during the night suggest he may be proved wrong.
11	Whistle and I'll Come to You	Andy de Emmony	Neil Cross	"'Oh, Whistle, and I'll Come to You, My Lad'" by M. R. James	24 December 2010	John Hurt, Gemma Jones, Leslie Sharp, Sophie Thompson
Leaving his ill and ageing wife in a care home, a retired astronomer revisits one of their old coastal haunts, but after discovering a ring on the beach is soon haunted himself.
12	The Tractate Middoth	Mark Gatiss	Mark Gatiss	"The Tractate Middoth" by M. R. James	25 December 2013	Sacha Dhawan, John Castle, Louise Jameson, David Ryall, Una Stubbs, Eleanor Bron, Roy Barraclough
A young librarian receives a request for an obscure Hebrew book from a sinister gentleman, unaware of its contents.
13	The Dead Room	Mark Gatiss	Mark Gatiss	–	24 December 2018	Simon Callow, Anjli Mohindra, Susan Penhaligon, Joshua Oakes-Rogers, Christopher Allen, Mark Gatiss
Aubrey Judd, veteran radio presenter of The Dead Room, soon realises that elements of his own past are not as dead and buried as he perhaps hoped.
14	Martin's Close	Mark Gatiss	Mark Gatiss	"Martin's Close" by M. R. James	24 December 2019	Peter Capaldi, Wilf Scolding, Elliot Levey, Simon Williams
A young squire, John Martin, is on trial for murder in a court presided over by hanging judge George Jeffreys, but the girl he is accused of murdering has been seen after her death.
15	The Mezzotint	Mark Gatiss	Mark Gatiss	"The Mezzotint" by M. R. James	24 December 2021	Rory Kinnear, Robert Bathurst, Frances Barber, John Hopkins, Emma Cunniffe, Nikesh Patel, Tommaso Di Vincenzo
A university museum curator is intrigued by the unfolding tale of horror told by an otherwise unprepossessing 19th century mezzotint.
16	Count Magnus	Mark Gatiss	Mark Gatiss	"Count Magnus" by M. R. James	23 December 2022	Jason Watkins, MyAnna Buring, Krister Henriksson, Max Bremer, Allan Corduner, Jamal Ajala
A travelogue writer, Mr Wraxhall, becomes fascinated by the story of Count Magnus, the long-dead founder of a Swedish family who once made a journey to the Holy Land for less than holy reasons.
17	Lot No. 249	Mark Gatiss	Mark Gatiss	"Lot No. 249" by Arthur Conan Doyle	24 December 2023	Kit Harington, Freddie Fox, Colin Ryan, John Heffernan, James Swanton, Jonathan Rigby, Andrew Horton
The purchase of an Ancient Egyptian mummy at an auction leads to a horrifying series of events for two Oxford students.
18	Woman of Stone	Mark Gatiss	Mark Gatiss	"Man-Size in Marble" by Edith Nesbit	24 December 2024	Celia Imrie, Monica Dolan, Éanna Hardwicke, Mawaan Rizwan, Phoebe Horn
A housekeeper warns two newlyweds about a legend involving their cottage, but to no avail.
19	The Room in the Tower	Mark Gatiss	Mark Gatiss	"The Room in the Tower" by E.F. Benson	24 December 2025	Tobias Menzies, Joanna Lumley, Nancy Carroll, Ben Mansfield, Polly Walker
A young man has a recurring nightmare about a visit to a friend's house.
20	The Bride's Chamber	Mark Gatiss	Mark Gatiss	"The Ghost in the Bride's Chamber" by Charles Dickens	24 December 2026	Jim Broadbent, Martin Freeman, Adrian Scarborough, Joe Armstrong, India Fowler, Lewis Shepherd
A suitor manipulates a young woman to claim her fortune but his actions have unforeseen consequences.

== Critical reception ==
The critical reception of the films has been varied, but several are regarded as classic television ghost stories. Dick Fiddy of the British Film Institute notes that the late hour of their broadcasts, and the contrast with the rest of the bright lights of the television schedules during the Christmas period, meant that the adaptations made an outsized impact:

They went out late at night, when television wasn't a 24-hour experience, probably watched by the dying embers of the fire before the viewer turned in for the night; the nightmarish quality of the stories would linger as they went to bed. Such conditions can magnify the power of the pieces, adding to their creepiness and helping the tales imbed themselves within impressionable minds.

Sarah Dempster, writing in The Guardian in 2005, noted that "Perhaps the most surprising aspect ... is how little its adaptations ... have dated. They may boast the odd signifier of cheap 1970s telly – outlandish regional vowels, inappropriate eyeliner, a surfeit of depressed oboes – but lurking within their hushed cloisters and glum expanses of deserted coastline is a timelessness at odds with virtually everything written, or broadcast, before or since."

The production values have received particular praise. Helen Wheatley writes that "the series was shot on film on location, with much attention paid to the minutiae of period detail; ... it might be seen to visually prefigure the filmic stylishness and traditions of later literary adaptations such as Brideshead Revisited and The Jewel in the Crown." However, she notes that, unlike those adaptations, the sinister tone of the period pieces could lend itself the label of a "feel bad" heritage television drama.

"Denholm (Elliot) was so wonderful in that role, like a tightly coiled spring. There was such tension in the character: he was always only a step away from insanity."

— Lawrence Gordon Clark

The Signalman is perhaps the most critically acclaimed. Simon Farquhar suggests that the film is the first evidence of Andrew Davies's gift as an adaptor of literary fiction: "despite an extremely arduous shoot, Davies and Clarke's fog-wreathed, flame-crackling masterpiece manages something the production team could never have imagined: it's better than the book." Dave Rolinson notes that, while "the adaptation inevitably misses Dickens's nuanced and often unsettling prose, ... it achieves comparably skilful effects through visual language and sound, heightening theme and supernatural mood. ... The production heightens the story's crucial features of repetition and foreshadowing."

Sergio Angelini writes about A Warning to the Curious: "Of Clark's many adaptations of James's stories, this is perhaps the most varied in its use of landscape and the most visually arresting in its attempt to create an otherworldly atmosphere. ... Using long lenses to flatten the scenery and make the ghost indistinct in the background, John McGlashan's fine cinematography brilliantly conveys the ageless, ritualistic determinism of Ager's pursuit and signposts the inevitability of Paxton's demise." Angelini is less appreciative of The Ash Tree, noting that the literal adaptation of the story's ending loses the atmosphere of earlier instalments: "While the creatures are certainly grotesque and threatening, compared with some of the other adaptations of the series, The Ash Tree does lose some power through this lack of ambiguity. The result overall remains satisfyingly unsettling, however, thanks also to Petherbridge's restrained, psychologically acute performance."

The adaptations have had an influence on the work of the writer Mark Gatiss. Interviewed in 2008, Gatiss said that Lost Hearts is his favourite adaptation because it is the one that frightened him as a child and that "I absolutely love The Treasure of Abbot Thomas. The moment when Michael Bryant has found the treasure and ... is obviously losing his wits. He just says, rationally, 'It is a thing of slime, I think. Darkness and slime ...' There's also the fantastic scene where he thinks he's got away with it by putting the treasure back. The doctor is heading up the drive and he can't quite see him in the sunlight. Then it pauses to that amazing crane shot. ... Very spooky."

The reception of the two later instalments, Stigma and The Ice House, was decidedly critical. Most reviewers concluded that switching to original stories instead of adaptations was "misjudged". David Kerekes writes that The Ice House is almost "totally forgotten". Wheatley has commented that they heralded a divergence from the stage-inspired horror of the 1940s and 1950s to a more modern Gothic horror based in the present day, losing in the process the "aesthetic of restraint" evident in the original adaptations.

The BBC Four revival beginning in 2005 with A View from a Hill was greeted warmly by Sarah Dempster of The Guardian, who stated that the programme was, "in every respect, a vintage Ghost Story for Christmas production. There are the powdery academics hamstrung by extreme social awkwardness. There is the bumbling protagonist bemused by a particular aspect of modern life. There are stunning, panoramic shots of a specific area of the British landscape...There is the determined lack of celebrity pizzazz. There is tweed. And there is, crucially, a single moment of heart-stopping, corner-of-the-eye horror that suggests life, for one powdery academic at least, will never be the same again."

== Related works ==
Before Clark's films came under the remit of the BBC Drama Department it commissioned a Christmas play from Nigel Kneale, an original ghost story called The Stone Tape, broadcast on Christmas Day 1972. With its modern setting, this is not generally included under the heading of A Ghost Story for Christmas and was originally intended as an episode of the anthology Dead of Night.

Though neither made by Clark nor part of the BBC's "A Ghost Story for Christmas" strand, but done in a similar style, a 15 minute adaptation of M.R. James's Mr. Humphreys and His Inheritance was adapted for television as part of an episode of the ITV Schools programme Music Scene, in 1976. The production was written, produced, and directed by Tony Scull and starred Geoffrey Russell as Mr. Humphreys. It is available on DVD as an extra on the Network DVD release of the 1979 ITV Playhouse production of Casting The Runes (see below).

Clark directed another story by M. R. James, Casting The Runes for the series ITV Playhouse, produced by Yorkshire Television and first broadcast on ITV on 24 April 1979. Adapted by Clive Exton, it reimagined the events of James's story taking place in a contemporary television studio.

For Christmas 1979 the BBC produced a 70-minute-long adaptation of Sheridan Le Fanu's gothic tale Schalcken the Painter, directed and adapted by Leslie Megahey. Like the earlier Whistle and I'll Come to You, the production was listed as part of the long-running BBC arts series Omnibus.

Repeats of the original series on BBC Four at Christmas 2007 included The Haunted Airman, a new adaptation of Dennis Wheatley's novel The Haunting of Toby Jugg by Chris Durlacher, although this film was originally screened on 31 October 2006.

For Christmas 2008 an original three-part ghost story by Mark Gatiss, Crooked House, was produced instead, though Gatiss has cited the original adaptations as a key influence.

The Turn of the Screw (1898), a novella by Henry James (no relation to M. R. James), was adapted as a feature-length drama by Sandy Welch and broadcast on BBC One on 30 December 2009.

Title	Author	UK broadcast date	Description	Main cast
Whistle and I'll Come to You	M. R. James, adapted by Jonathan Miller	7 May 1968	An eccentric professor finds a whistle carved from bone in a graveyard while on holiday in Norfolk. After blowing the whistle, he is troubled by terrible visions.	Michael Hordern
The Stone Tape	Nigel Kneale	25 December 1972	An electronics company looking for a new recording medium discover that ghosts in their research building could inspire the new format they were after.	Michael Bryant, Jane Asher, Ian Cuthbertson.
Mr. Humphreys and His Inheritance	M.R. James, adapted by Tony Scull	21 June 1976 (on ITV)	A modest clerk unexpectedly inherits a country mansion from an uncle. In its grounds lies a maze and, when he explores it, he disturbs something frightening at its centre.	Geoffrey Russell, Peter Wheeler, Peter Clough
Casting the Runes	M. R. James, adapted by Clive Exton	24 April 1979 (on ITV)	After an infamous demonologist is ridiculed on a television programme, its producer soon finds herself targeted by malevolent supernatural forces.	Jan Francis, Bernard Gallagher, Iain Cuthbertson
Schalcken the Painter	J. Sheridan Le Fanu, adapted by Leslie Megahey	23 December 1979	Schalcken the painter sees his one true love, Rose, wedded by contract for a sum of money to a man who may or may not be a ghost. When she escapes and returns home, she is pursued by her ghostly lover.	Jeremy Clyde, Maurice Denham, Cheryl Kennedy
The Haunted Airman	Dennis Wheatley, adapted by Chris Durlacher	15 December 2007 (originally premiered 31 October 2006)	An injured RAF Flight Lieutenant suffers from repeated horrific nightmares while recuperating at a remote mansion in Wales. However, he begins to suspect his psychiatrist or aunt may be responsible.	Robert Pattinson, Julian Sands, Rachael Stirling
Crooked House	Mark Gatiss	22 December 2008 – 24 December 2008	Three linked episodes tell the story of the ghostly secrets of Geap Manor, a recently demolished Tudor mansion in both the past and present.	Lee Ingleby, Mark Gatiss, Philip Jackson
The Turn of the Screw	Henry James, adapted by Sandy Welch	30 December 2009	A governess, incarcerated in a mental asylum, tells a doctor of the possession of her two pupils by a former governess and her lover.	Michelle Dockery, Sue Johnston, Dan Stevens

== Home media ==
A Warning to the Curious, The Signalman and Miller's Whistle and I'll Come to You were released as individual VHS cassettes and Region 2 DVDs by the British Film Institute in 2002 and 2003. A number of the adaptations were made available in Region 4 format in Australia in 2011 and The Signalman is included as an extra on the Region 1 American DVD release of the 1995 BBC production of Hard Times. For Christmas 2011, the BFI featured the complete 1970s films in their Mediatheque centres.

The BFI released the complete set of Ghost Story for Christmas films plus related works such as both versions of Whistle and I'll Come to You on Region 2 DVD in 2012, in five volumes as well as a box set, in celebration of the 150th anniversary of M. R. James's birth. The following year, an expanded boxset featuring Robert Powell and Michael Bryant narrating M. R. James in the series Classic Ghost Stories (1986) and Spine Chillers (1980) respectively.

Mark Gatiss's films The Tractate Middoth, The Dead Room, Martin's Close and The Mezzotint were released together on DVD as "Ghost Stories" in October 2022.

The first three Ghost Story for Christmas films plus both versions of Whistle and I'll Come to You (1968 and 2010) were remastered from the original film negatives by the BFI and released on Blu-ray disc as Ghost Stories for Christmas: Volume 1 in December 2022. The remaining five Ghost Story for Christmas films plus A View From A Hill (2005) and Number 13 (2006) were released as Ghost Stories for Christmas: Volume 2 in November 2023.

A Blu-ray release from the BBC entitled A Ghost Story for Christmas: The Collection is set to be released on 7 September 2026, featuring the Mark Gatiss films The Tractate Middoth, The Dead Room, Martin's Close, The Mezzotint, Count Magnus, Lot No. 249, Woman of Stone, and The Room in the Tower.

== See also ==
- List of ghost films
- Christmas horror
- Dead of Night – 1972 BBC horror anthology series
- Beasts – 1976 ITV horror anthology series
- Supernatural – 1977 BBC horror anthology series
