= Martin's Close =

Ghost story by M.R. James

- Short story by M. R. James
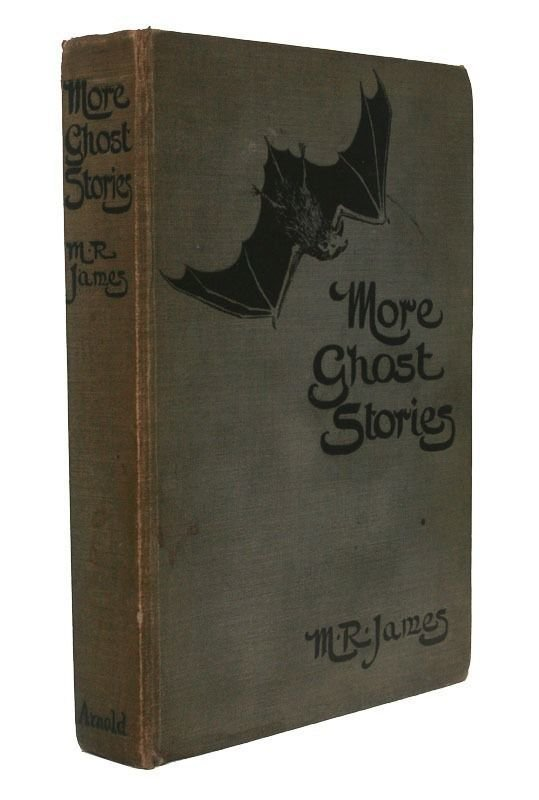
- "Martin's Close" was published in More Ghost Stories of an Antiquary in 1911.

Text available at Wikisource
- Country: England
- Language: English
- Genre: Horror

Publication
- Published in: More Ghost Stories of an Antiquary
- Publisher: Edward Arnold
- Publication date: 1911

"Martin's Close" is a ghost story by British writer M. R. James, included in his 1911 collection More Ghost Stories of an Antiquary. In 1931, it was collected in James' book The Collected Ghost Stories of M. R. James. A work of historical fiction set in seventeenth century England, it concerns the trial of a murderer haunted by the ghost of his victim. It has been adapted several times by the BBC, including a 1938 radio play on the Regional Programme and a 2019 episode of A Ghost Story for Christmas.

== Plot summary ==
In the story's framing device, the narrator is staying with the rector of a parish in west England, (Note: In the introduction to The Collected Ghost Stories of M. R. James, James reveals that the story is set in Sampford Courtenay in Devon.) who suggests that he ask John Hill, a carpenter and handyman, about "Martin's Close", a small uncultivated enclosure. Hill tells the narrator that esquire George Martin is buried there, having been hanged for murdering a young woman. Interested, the narrator purchases a shorthand transcript of the murder trial by T. Gurney.

The trial begins on 19 November 1684 in the Old Bailey, with George Jeffreys, 1st Baron Jeffreys as judge and Sir Robert Sawyer as prosecutor. Martin is accused of cutting the throat of Ann Clark on 15 May 1684 and throwing her body into a pond; he pleads not guilty. Sawyer explains that Clark was an impoverished and intellectually disabled country girl. Visiting the New Inn around Christmas 1683, Martin encountered Clark, who he invited to dance "by way of a jest". Martin and Clark subsequently began seeing one another, with Martin alerting her to his presence by whistling "Madam, will you walk?" Several weeks later, Martin became engaged to a "young gentlewoman", but she ended their engagement after learning of Martin's association with Clark. Enraged, Martin insulted and whipped Clark, but she remained infatuated with him. On 15 May 1684, Martin was seen to speak to Clark, who subsequently went missing. In June 1684, her body was found in a pond alongside a knife belonging to Martin.

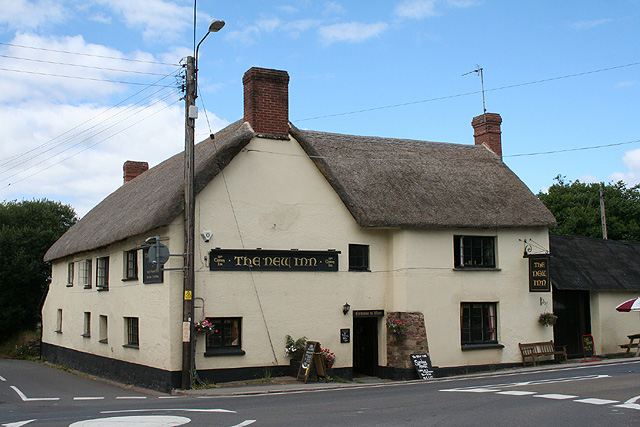
The New Inn in Sampford Courtenay

Sarah Arscott, keeper of the New Inn, testifies that on the evening after Clark had gone missing, Martin had visited the inn for a drink. After Arscott began singing "Madam, will you walk?", she heard Clark's distinctive voice singing the song outside the inn. Arscott ran to the door to let Clark in, but was restrained by Martin; Thomas Snell, another patron, opened the door, causing the wind to blow out the candles. In the darkness, Arscott heard footsteps cross the room and a cupboard door open and close. Relighting the candles, Arscott saw a wet cloak and dress protruding from the cupboard door. After Arscott announced that someone was hiding in the cupboard, Martin fled the inn. The cupboard door was pushed open from the inside and a mysterious dark object ran out of the inn. Snell adds that, while Arscott was out of the room, he had asked to borrow a knife from Martin to cut tobacco; Martin was horrified to realise he did not have his knife, saying "I must have left it there."

The court then hears evidence from William Reddaway, a 13 year old boy. Reddaway testifies that while keeping cows on the moor on 23 May 1864, he saw Martin probing a pond with a pole, then throw himself on the ground covering his ears. Reddaway adds that Martin had previously asked him to look for a knife, paying him sixpence not to mention it, and that the pond had developed a foul smell and that the cows had refused to drink from it. Reddaway tearfully claims that later that same evening, he had seen Clark emerge from the pond and run after Martin.

Martin defends himself by disparaging the testimony of "a parcel of country people and children that would believe any idle tale", but is found guilty. Martin seeks to have the verdict overturned due his name being misspelled in the indictment, but Jeffreys dismisses this as immaterial. Jeffreys sentences Martin to be hanged on 28 December 1684. Gurney comments on Martin's behaviour throughout the trial, noting "he was looking narrowly among the people and often turning round very sharply, as if some person might be at his ear", and on the unusual darkness and quietness of the courtroom.

The narrator concludes by noting that "Madam, will you walk?" is regarded as unlucky in Clark's village, though no-one remembers why.

== Publication ==
"Martin's Close" was first published in More Ghost Stories of an Antiquary in 1911. In 1931, it was collected in James' book The Collected Ghost Stories of M. R. James. It has since been anthologised many times. The original manuscript was sold by Sotheby's on November 9, 1936.

== Reception ==
Rosemary Pardoe states, "It is widely acknowledged that in this account of a trial before Judge Jeffreys, [James] is at the height of his powers as a brilliant historical pastichist."

== Adaptations ==
On 12 March 1938, the BBC's London Regional Programme broadcast an adaptation of "Martin's Close" under the title Madam, Will You Walk? The 40-minute play was written by C. Whitaker-Wilson and produced by John Cheatle. The Radio Times printed the musical notation for the ghostly refrain and noted, "You will have had quite enough of that tune before the play has ended. You will hear it played by a string quartet... you will hear it sung by Judge Jeffries in court (an actual fact); and, worse still, you will hear it floating on a gale of wind, sung by a murdered girl near a lonely inn in a Devonshire village. That also is a fact."

On 4 April 1940, the BBC broadcast a second version of "Martin's Close", this time a 25-minute reading by John Gloag for the new BBC Home Service.

On 13 February 1946, C. Whitaker-Wilson's 1938 script of Madam, Will You Walk? was remounted in a 45-minute production for the BBC Home Service, this time produced by Noel Iliff. Whitaker-Wilson himself played the part of Judge Jeffreys.

On 20 August 1963, Charles Lefeaux produced a new version of "Martin's Close", adapted by Michael Hardwick and Mollie Hardwick, for Mystery Playhouse and the BBC Home Service. The 30-minute piece starred Donald Wolfit as Judge Jeffreys. ("What see you in the corner of the Court, that you fix your eyes on it and not on me, your Judge?" teased the Radio Times.) The play was repeated on BBC Radio 4 Extra on 26 February 2018. Sound effects were provided by the BBC Radiophonic Workshop, and the original sound-effects reel was preserved in their archive.

On 24 December 2019, a version of the story, Martin's Close, adapted by Mark Gatiss, was broadcast on BBC Four as part of the long-running A Ghost Story for Christmas series. It starred Peter Capaldi, Elliot Levey, Wilf Scolding, Sara Crowe, James Holmes, Jessica Temple, Simon Williams, Fisayo Akinade, and Ian Hallard.
