= Martin's Close (film) =

2019 British television ghost story

- Title screen
- Based on: "Martin's Close" by M. R. James
- Written by: Mark Gatiss
- Directed by: Mark Gatiss
- Starring: Peter Capaldi as Dolben; Elliot Levey as Judge Jeffreys; Wilf Scolding as John Martin; Sara Crowe as Sarah Arscott; James Holmes as Thomas Snell; Jessica Temple as Ann Clark; Simon Williams as Stanton; Fisayo Akinade as William; Ian Hallard as Hosier

Production
- Producer: Isibeal Ballance
- Running time: 30 minutes

Original release
- Network: BBC Two
- Release: 24 December 2019

Related
- A Ghost Story for Christmas

Martin's Close is a short film which is part of the British supernatural anthology series A Ghost Story for Christmas. Produced by Isibeal Ballance and written and directed by Mark Gatiss, it is based on the ghost story of the same name by M. R. James, first published in the collection More Ghost Stories of an Antiquary (1911), and first aired on BBC Two on 24 December 2019.

It stars Wilf Scolding as John Martin, who is prosecuted for murder in a court presided over by the hanging judge Judge Jeffreys (Elliot Levey), despite the girl he is accused of murdering having been seen since her apparent death.

The film was well-received by critics, though there was some criticism of its structure.

== Synopsis ==
The narrator, Stanton (Simon Williams), tells the tale of a young squire, John Martin (Wilf Scolding), who in 1684 is prosecuted for murder by the King's Counsel (Peter Capaldi) in a court presided over by the notorious Judge Jeffreys (Elliot Levey). But Ann Clark (Jessica Temple), the simple-minded and poor country girl he is accused of murdering, has been seen after her death.

== Cast ==
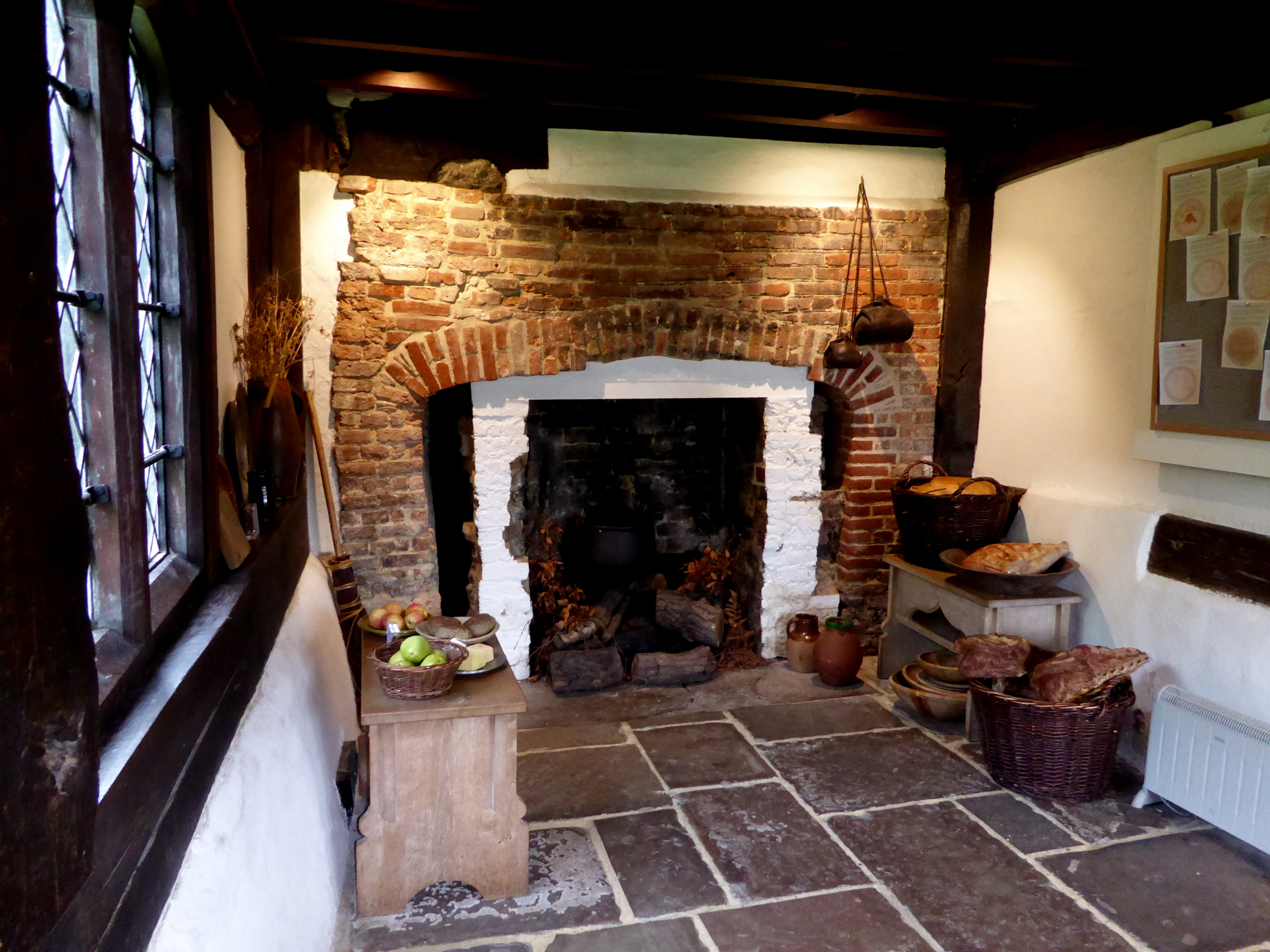
The kitchen at Queen Elizabeth's Hunting Lodge was used for the scene where the ghost of Ann Clark appears at the inn

- Peter Capaldi .. Dolben
- Elliot Levey .. Judge Jeffreys
- Wilf Scolding .. John Martin
- Sara Crowe .. Sarah Arscott
- James Holmes .. Thomas Snell
- Jessica Temple .. Ann Clark
- Simon Williams .. Stanton
- Fisayo Akinade .. William
- Ian Hallard .. Hosier

== Production ==
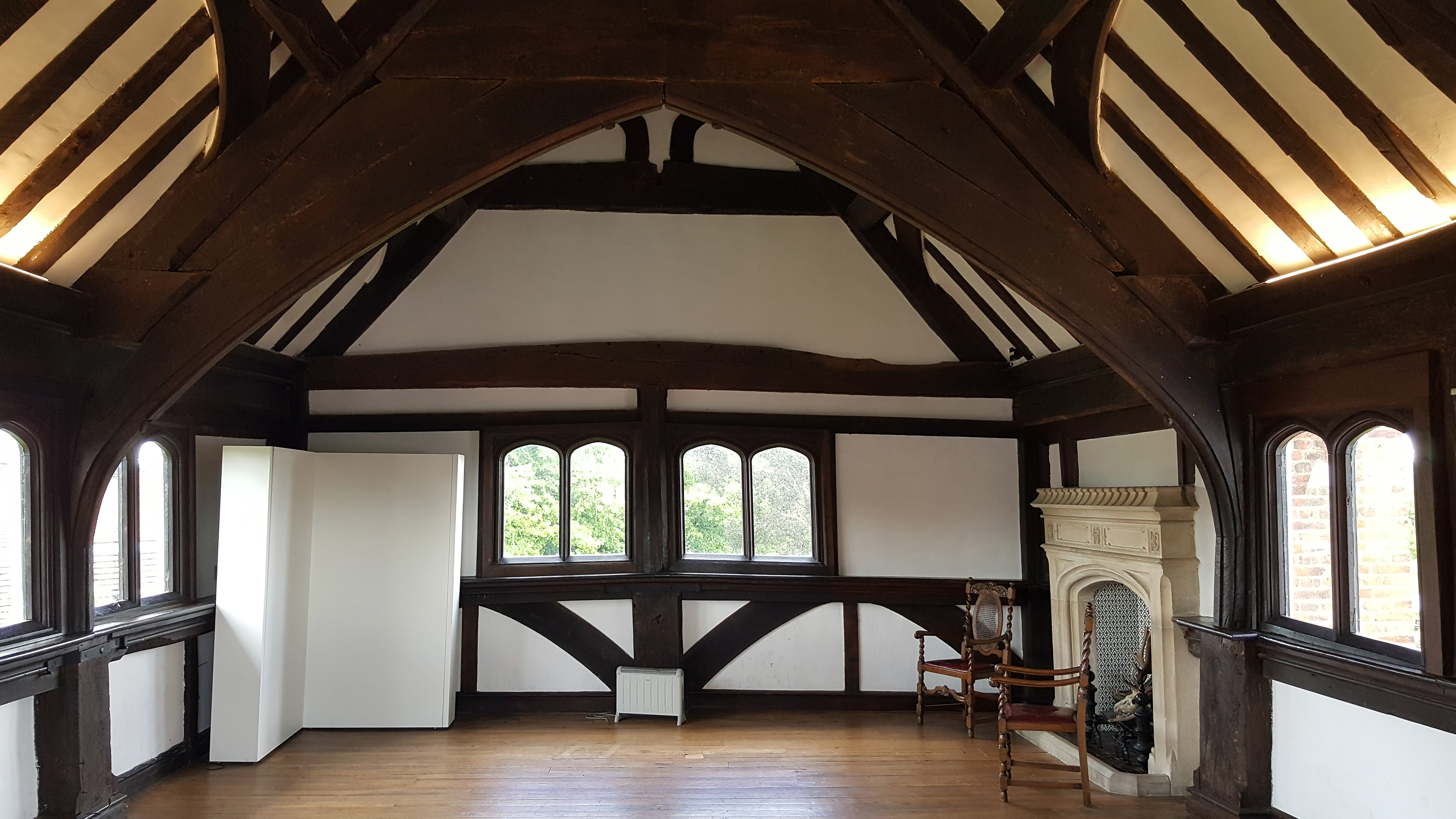
The top floor of Queen Elizabeth's Hunting Lodge was used for the trial scenes

The drama was filmed at Queen Elizabeth's Hunting Lodge in Epping Forest. The first floor Salon was used for the scene of the party where John Martin first encounters Ann Clark, while the top floor was used for the court scenes.

== Critical reception ==
Giving the production three stars out of five, Tilly Pearce, the critic for Metro, wrote: "It's a snappy tale that doesn't take too much of your time, and it's got a fair amount of freaky moments that actually make your skin crawl a little bit."

Michael Hogan, the critic for The Daily Telegraph, also giving three stars out of five, wrote:

"I must confess, I found the ending a mild disappointment. I found myself waiting for a twist or explanation that never came. Instead we were left with the haunting image of Martin being led off to the gallows and Ann's ghost gleefully joining the procession. This was eerie fare, rather than flat-out scary.

Budgetary limitations meant the simple story was told with a small cast and stripped-back, stagey production... For a punchy half-hour piece, however, its storytelling style felt unnecessarily convoluted..."

== Home video ==
"Martin's Close" was first released on DVD in 2022 by 2 Entertain along with "The Tractate Middoth" (2013), "The Dead Room" (2018), and "The Mezzotint" (2021) on a single DVD titled Ghost Stories.
