= The Room in the Tower =

1912 short horror story by EF Benson

- Short story by E. F. Benson
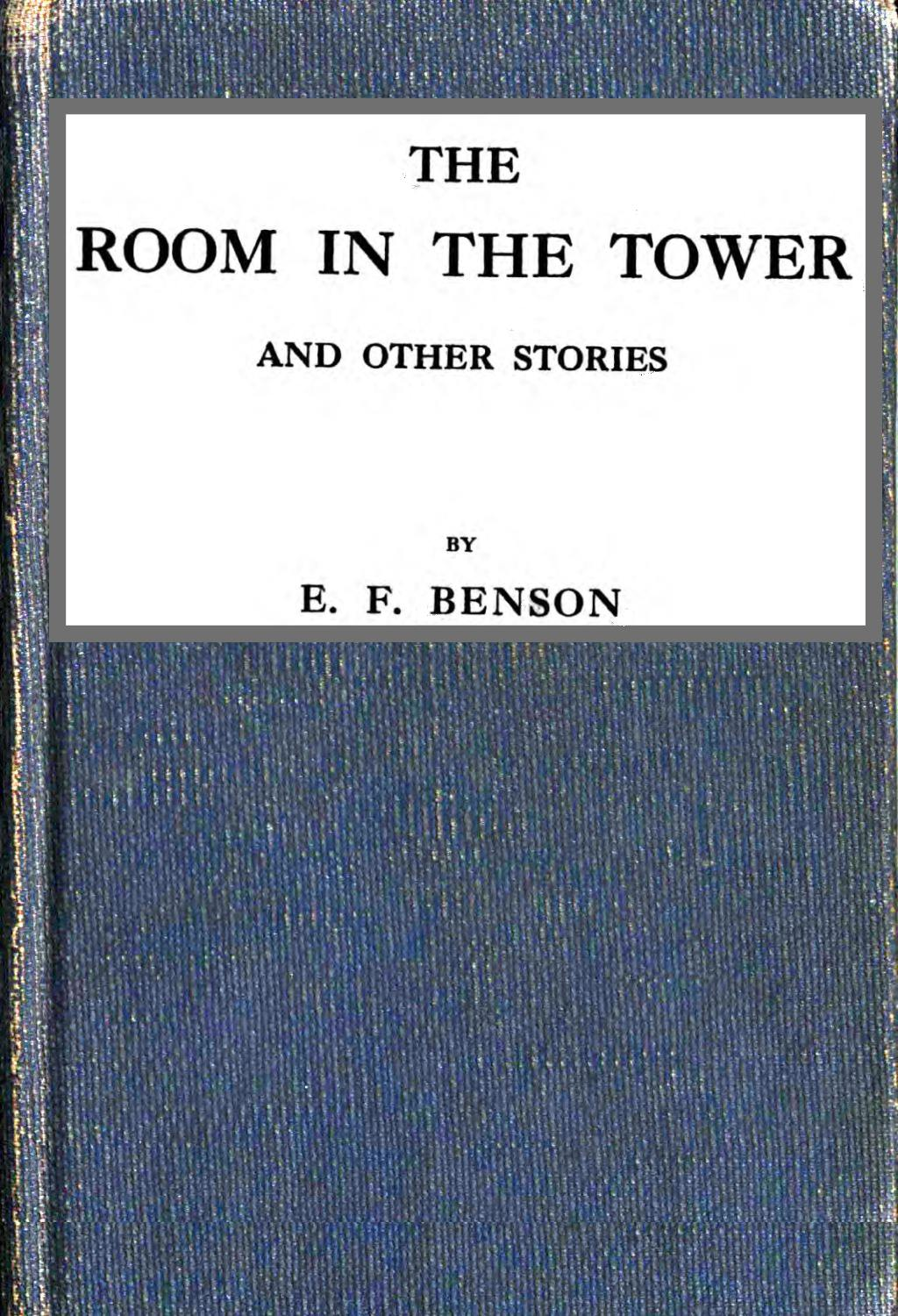
- The front cover of The Room in the Tower and Other Stories.

Text available at Wikisource
- Country: United Kingdom
- Language: English
- Genre: Horror

Publication
- Publication date: 1912

"The Room in the Tower" is a short horror story by E. F. Benson, published in 1912 as part of his collection The Room in the Tower and Other Stories.

== Plot summary ==
An unnamed young man has a recurring nightmare in which he visits a friend's house in the summer. The friend's family is silent and grim. The friend's sinister mother, Mrs. Stone, assigns the young man a room in the tower, a room that fills him with dread. The dream never reveals what is in the room. The dream varies each night, and over years the characters grow older and stranger. At some point Mrs. Stone dies and is buried, yet she still assigns him the room in the tower.

In his waking life, a friend named Clinton invites the young man to his family's house in the country. The young man is surprised that everything there matches his nightmare, except for the names and personalities of the family. Unlike the dream, the visit is very enjoyable. As a thunderstorm gathers, his friend's mother offers him a room in the tower. The young man is struck with dread, but laughs it off. As his friend helps him prepare the room, they find an ancient portrait of Mrs. Stone from the dream. They remove it from the wall and carry it into the hall, and find their hands are covered with blood but neither man is injured. Unsettled, they retire to bed.

The young man is awakened by a thunderclap to find Mrs. Stone standing over his bed. She confesses herself a vampire, along with her intention to transform him into one as well, and attacks. He fends her off by flailing his arms. His friend bursts into the room, attracted by the commotion, but Mrs. Stone is not there. Although the friend tries to assure him it was only a nightmare, they find the portrait has returned to the wall and there is a mouldy burial shroud on the floor. The men flee the room.

An epilogue describes an old newspaper story about a Mrs. Stone, rumoured as an evil person, who died in a nearby village and was buried in the local churchyard. Each morning, her coffin was found to have ejected itself from the ground, and it would be reburied. Eventually the authorities gave up and interred the coffin in unhallowed ground, which brought an end to the unusual phenomenon.

== Reception ==
The Modern Language Review in 1918 stated that with “The Room in the Tower”, "Mr. E. F. Benson also has established an undeniable right to inclusion in a study of the supernatural in fiction".

== Adaptations ==
A short film of the same name was made in 2025 for the BBC's A Ghost Story for Christmas strand.
