= The Room in the Tower (film) =

2025 British television ghost story

- Based on: "The Room in the Tower" by E.F. Benson
- Written by: Mark Gatiss
- Directed by: Mark Gatiss
- Starring: Joanna Lumley; Tobias Menzies; Polly Walker; Nancy Carroll; Ben Mansfield

Production
- Producer: Isibéal Ballance
- Running time: 30 minutes

Original release
- Release: 24 December 2025

Related
- A Ghost Story for Christmas

The Room in the Tower is a short film which is part of the British supernatural anthology series A Ghost Story for Christmas. Produced by Isibéal Ballance and written and directed by Mark Gatiss, it is an adaptation of E. F. Benson's short story of the same name.

== Premise ==
A man in an air-raid shelter during World War Two discusses a recurring nightmare which has blighted his life.

== Cast ==
- Joanna Lumley as Julia Stone
- Tobias Menzies as Roger Winstanley
- Polly Walker as Mrs Clinton
- Nancy Carroll as Verity Gordon Clark
- Ben Mansfield as John Clinton
- Toby as Bob

== Production ==
Mark Gatiss wrote and directed the film, which is his eighth A Ghost Story for Christmas special. It is an adaptation of E.F. Benson's short story of the same name. It was produced by Adorable Media for BBC Two and BBC iPlayer, with Isibéal Ballance producer for Adorable Media.

The cast includes Joanna Lumley, Tobias Menzies, Polly Walker, Nancy Carroll and Ben Mansfield. Carroll's character Verity Gordon Clark is named in honour of Lawrence Gordon Clark, a previous long-standing director of the series.

Filming took place on location in Cobham Hall, Kent in 2025.

== Broadcast ==
The film aired on BBC Two on 24 December 2025.

== Reception ==
Lucy Mangan in The Guardian praised the performance of Menzies, and noted that elements of the film were more akin to "horror rather than ghost story". Sean O'Grady in The Independent awarded the film five stars, praising the script and the performance of Lumley, as well as the "unobtrusively suspenseful score". Pat Stacey in The Irish Independent described it as the "finest instalment in a long time" with a "superb use of atmosphere and especially sound…the climax is surprising and genuinely creepy".
