= The Dead Room (2018 film) =

British television ghost story

- Written by: Mark Gatiss
- Directed by: Mark Gatiss
- Starring: Simon Callow as Aubrey Judd; Anjli Mohindra as Tara Lohia; Susan Penhaligon as Joan; Joshua Oakes-Rogers as Paul

Production
- Producer: Isibeal Ballance
- Running time: 30 minutes

Original release
- Network: BBC Four
- Release: 24 December 2018

Related
- A Ghost Story for Christmas

The Dead Room is a short film which is part of the British supernatural anthology series A Ghost Story for Christmas. Produced by Isibeal Ballance and written and directed by Mark Gatiss, it is the first film to be an original story since The Ice House (1978) and first aired on BBC Four on 24 December 2018.

It stars Simon Callow as Aubrey Judd, an accomplished radio actor who is the host of the long-running horror radio series The Dead Room. He and his ambitious new producer Tara (Anjli Mohindra), of whom he is dismissive due to her inexperience with the genre, discuss what makes a great ghost story whilst he reminisces about his youth in the heatwave of 1976. However, his repressed guilt over an affair he had that summer starts to haunt him as he realizes he isn't alone in the recording booth.

It is inspired by the 1931 essay "Ghosts - Treat Them Gently!" by the author M. R. James, in which he discussed his interest in ghosts and his ground rules for a ghost story. The majority of A Ghost Story for Christmas episodes are based on James' ghost stories, which are widely regarded as the best in the English language. Gatiss' love of James' stories and their adaptations led to him helming the series starting with The Tractate Middoth (2013), and he wrote this episode to explore the ideas presented in James' essay.

== Cast and characters ==
- Simon Callow as Aubrey Judd, a famous radio actor.
- Anjli Mohindra as Tara Lohia, an ambitious radio producer.
- Susan Penhaligon as Joan
- Joshua Oakes-Rogers as Paul
- Mark Gatiss as Radio Announcer (voice)
- Christopher Allen as DJ voice (voice)

== Production ==
The television film was announced by the channel editor for BBC Four, Cassian Harrison, at the Edinburgh TV Festival on 23 August 2018 alongside other commissions including The Yorkshire Ripper, You, Me and Eugenics and the acquisition of the television series The Plague.

The film was shot at Maida Vale Studios.

== Broadcast ==
The film was broadcast on 24 December 2018 and was viewed by 0.991 million viewers.

== Home video ==
"The Dead Room" was first released on DVD in 2022 by 2 Entertain along with "The Tractate Middoth" (2013), "Martin's Close" (2019), and "The Mezzotint" (2021) on a single DVD titled Ghost Stories.
