= The Cry (2002 TV series) =

- Genre: Thriller
- Written by: Peter Ransley
- Directed by: David Drury
- Starring: Sarah Lancashire; Emma Cunniffe; Anthony Calf; Joe Duttine; James Laurenson; Jasper Britton; Michael Cochrane; Anna Keaveney
- Composer: Alan Parker
- Country of origin: United Kingdom
- Original language: English
- No. of series: 1
- No. of episodes: 4

Production
- Executive producer: Sally Head
- Producer: Keith Thompson
- Cinematography: Dominic Clemence
- Editor: Ian Farr
- Running time: 50 minutes
- Production company: Sally Head Productions

Original release
- Network: ITV
- Release: 8 April – 15 April 2002

The Cry is a British television thriller miniseries, comprising four fifty-minute episodes, that first broadcast on ITV between 8 and 15 April 2002. The series stars Sarah Lancashire as Meg Bartlett, a child protection officer working for social services, who after suffering a second miscarriage, befriends a young mum, Christine Rearden (Emma Cunniffe), whom she later suspects of abusing her daughter, Eleanor. Joe Duttine, Anthony Calf and James Laurenson co-starred alongside Lancashire and Cunniffe. The series was directed by David Drury and written by playwright Peter Ransley. Two episodes were broadcast each week.

The Cry received mixed critical reviews, with The Movie Zone stating that it "would be better chopped down to 135 minutes", with some scenes feeling "padded" and the series "making more of subplots than it needs to". The Cry was also broadcast in Australia in December 2005. The series was released on VHS in the UK on 24 February 2003. Despite remaining unreleased on DVD in its native country, The Cry was released on DVD in the Czech Republic.

== Cast ==
- Sarah Lancashire as Meg Bartlett; a child protection officer
- Emma Cunniffe as Christine Rearden; a young mum Meg suspects of abusing her daughter
- Anthony Calf as Simon Bartlett; Meg's husband
- Joe Duttine as Ian Rearden; Christine's husband and a former premier league footballer
- James Laurenson as Richard Crossdyke; Meg's father and Home Secretary
- Jasper Britton as Mark Billington; Richard Crossdyke's personal assistant
- Louise Bush as Sarah Oswell; nurse at the local community hospital
- Cathy White as Nell Doyle; nurse at the local community hospital
- Michael Cochrane as Nathaniel Weekly; defence barrister representing Christine and Ian
- Anna Keaveney as Pauline Taylor; housekeeper of a cottage where Meg goes to hide out
- Bev Willis as Dr. Oliver Erskine; a local GP who examines the Rearden's baby whilst in Meg's care

== Episodes ==
No.	Title	Directed by	Written by	British air date	UK viewers (million)
1	"Episode 1"	David Drury	Peter Ransley	8 April 2002	5.75
Meg Bartlett, a child protection officer working for social services, is admitted to hospital after suffering her second miscarriage. During her stay, she befriends a young mum, Christine Rearden, whose three-month old daughter, Eleanor, has been admitted to hospital with breathing difficulties. When Christine asks Meg to look after the child momentarily, Meg notices bruising which Christine passes off as being a result of her breathing problems. In a fragile state of mind, Meg dismisses her concerns. During a delirious episode later that night, Meg tries to take another woman's child from the hospital ward. Despite not being present at the time, Christine unexpectedly provides Meg with an alibi by claiming she heard the baby in distress. Meg and Christine begin to bond, until Christine makes the suggestion that her husband, Ian, can be violent.
2	"Episode 2"	David Drury	Peter Ransley	8 April 2002	5.75
Having raised her concerns to her colleagues to no avail, Meg decides to investigate further, despite being warned by her father and husband that she is entering dangerous territory. Meg decides to keep watch in the hospital ward where Eleanor is being treated, suspecting that Ian may try to harm Eleanor. However, she is surprised to wake one morning to find Christine seemingly trying to smother Eleanor. Meg makes the immediate decision to take the child into care. During a court hearing, Meg's findings are seemingly ignored by the judge as her fragile state of mind is questioned. When the court dismisses the case, Meg realises that she has to take further action to ensure Eleanor doesn't come to any further harm, and in a moment of madness, takes Eleanor from her hospital bed.
3	"Episode 3"	David Drury	Peter Ransley	15 April 2002	6.18
Having no choice but to go on the run, Meg hides out in the countryside as she begins investigating Christine's past. She befriends the housekeeper of the cottage where she is staying, Mrs Taylor, who offers to look after Eleanor in her absence. Using the opportunity, Meg approaches the owner of a babysitting agency where Christine was employed as a teenager. She shockingly discovers that Christine was present when a two-year-old boy, David, seemingly died of an asthma attack, and that when she left employment, Christine claimed to have been pregnant. Determined to find out what happened to Christine's first child, Meg decides to approach her mother.
4	"Episode 4"	David Drury	Peter Ransley	15 April 2002	6.18
Posing as a reporter, Meg approaches Christine's mum, who unwittingly reveals that Christine gave birth to a son, Paul, who died aged just six months of suspected cot death. However, before she can gather further details on what happened to Paul, Christine returns home and threatens her with a knife, injuring Ian in the process. With her suspicions seemingly confirmed, Meg decides to hand herself in to allow the police to conduct an official investigation. However, Richard is determined to keep Meg out of prison and offers her a deal: to hand the child back to its parents under the watchful eye of the country's press. Meg refuses, and decides that the only way to close the case once and for all is to find Paul's grave, which she suspects may be hidden in the woods close to the family estate.
