= The Bride's Chamber =

2026 British television ghost story

- Based on: "The Ghost in the Bride's Chamber" by Charles Dickens and Wilkie Collins
- Written by: Mark Gatiss
- Directed by: Mark Gatiss
- Starring: Martin Freeman; Jim Broadbent; Adrian Scarborough; Joe Armstrong; India Fowler; Lewis Shepherd

Production
- Producer: Isibeal Ballance
- Running time: 30 minutes

Related
- A Ghost Story for Christmas

The Bride’s Chamber is a short film which is part of the British supernatural anthology series A Ghost Story for Christmas. It is written and directed by Mark Gatiss and produced by Isibeal Ballance. It is based on the gothic horror story of "The Ghost in the Bride's Chamber" by Charles Dickens and Wilkie Collins in 1858.

It stars Martin Freeman and Jim Broadbent and is set to broadcast on BBC Two on 24 December 2026, and available on BBC iPlayer from 27 November 2026.

== Premise ==
A suitor manipulates a young woman to claim her fortune but his actions have unforeseen consequences.

== Cast ==
- Martin Freeman
- Jim Broadbent
- Adrian Scarborough
- Joe Armstrong
- India Fowler
- Lewis Shepherd

== Production ==
The story was adapted by Mark Gattiss, produced by Adorable Media, and with BBC Studios handling international distribution. Isibeal Ballance is the producer. The short film is adapted by the short story of the same name by Charles Dickens and Wilkie Collins. The original story was part-inspired by real events in Chorley, Lancashire in 1857 prior to Dickens and Collin’s staying in the town during a tour of the Lake District. As well as part of A Ghost Story for Christmas, the short film coincides with a range of Charles Dickens-themed programming airing across the BBC in December 2026 as part of the National Year of Reading.

The cast includes Martin Freeman, Jim Broadbent, India Fowler, Adrian Scarborough, Joe Armstrong, and Lewis Shephard.

Principal photography took place on location in Ingatestone Hall, in Essex, England, in 2026 with images released to the media in October 2026.

== Broadcast ==
The series is available from 27 November 2026 on BBC iPlayer and airs on 24 December 2026 on BBC Two.
