= The Mezzotint (film) =

2021 British television ghost story

- Title screen
- Based on: "The Mezzotint" by M. R. James
- Written by: Mark Gatiss
- Directed by: Mark Gatiss
- Starring: Rory Kinnear as Williams; Robert Bathurst as Garwood; Frances Barber as Mrs. Ambrigail; John Hopkins as Binks; Emma Cunniffe as Mrs. Filcher; Nikesh Patel as Nisbet; Tommaso Di Vincenzo as Gawdy

Production
- Producer: Isibeal Ballance
- Running time: 30 minutes

Original release
- Network: BBC Two
- Release: 24 December 2021

Related
- A Ghost Story for Christmas

The Mezzotint is a short film which is part of the British supernatural anthology series A Ghost Story for Christmas. Produced by Isibeal Ballance and written and directed by Mark Gatiss, it is based on the ghost story of the same name by M. R. James, first published in the collection Ghost Stories of an Antiquary (1904), and first aired on BBC Two on 24 December 2021.

Set in 1922, it stars Rory Kinnear as Edward Williams, a curator of a small university museum who receives a seemingly-innocuous 19th century mezzotint whose details appear to change whenever it is viewed, hinting at an old tragedy which has connections with Williams' attempts to uncover his family history.

"The Mezzotint" was chosen for adaptation as a replacement for an original story written by Gatiss, The Night Wedding, which had been intended to air in 2020 but was postponed due to the COVID-19 pandemic, and Gatiss shelved the story due to concerns about the subject matter. "The Mezzotint" was picked as it was well-suited to the limited budget and shooting time and the need to follow COVID restrictions. It was well-received by critics.

== Synopsis ==
In 1922 the middle-aged and bumptious bachelor Edward Williams (Rory Kinnear) is living an uncomplicated life as the curator of a small museum at an Oxford-style college. His life revolves around his work, golf, playing cards and trying to solve a family mystery - why his great grandfather had two surnames on his birth certificate. Specialising in the topography of England, he is initially uninterested when an art dealer sends him details of an early 19th-century engraving, a mezzotint, of an old country house. The engraving has a very high price - two guineas - for so average a piece - and Williams sends for it on approval to see if it justifies the amount being asked for. When the picture arrives his golfing friend Binks (John Hopkins) comments on the wonderful play of moonlight across the lawn in the picture. And a figure on the edge of the engraving. But there hadn't been a moon - or a figure - when Williams had first looked at it. Williams encounters the eccentric Mrs Ambrigail (Frances Barber), the wife of the local vicar, and discusses with her his attempts at solving the mystery about his ancestor's two surnames.

Binks discovers that the house in the picture is Anningley Hall in Essex, where the infant child of a former owner disappeared mysteriously one night, soon after the child's father had Gawdy, a local poacher, executed. The heartbroken father, who was discovered dead three years later, turns out to be the artist who created the mezzotint. Williams discovers that the mezzotint changes every time he looks at it - with something sinister and "rather too grotesque" appearing in the image with links to his own family.

== Cast ==
- Rory Kinnear as Williams
- Robert Bathurst as Garwood
- Frances Barber as Mrs Ambrigail
- John Hopkins as Binks
- Emma Cunniffe as Mrs Filcher
- Nikesh Patel as Nisbet
- Tommaso Di Vincenzo as Gawdy

== Production ==
The film was made by Can Do Productions and Adorable Media for BBC Television. Gatiss had penned an original story, The Night Wedding, which was intended to air in 2020 as the follow-up to "Martin's Close" (2019). However, production was delayed due to the COVID-19 pandemic, and he felt that the subject matter would be inappropriate due to it involving the deaths of elderly residents at a care home. The Mezzotint was chosen as a replacement due to the original story lending itself to a bottle episode, which suited the restrictions still in place when it was filmed in February 2021 on a small budget and with limited shooting time.

As with most adaptations in the series, additional material was created which diverged from the story. A subplot was added tying Mr. Williams's family to the events depicted in the mezzotint, leading to the appearance of a gory apparition. The adaptation also added female characters, with a subplot involving a debate over whether or not the college should grant degrees to women, and the character of Nesbit was portrayed as being of South Asian descent. The acrobat and contortionist Tommaso Di Vincenzo, whose skills had previously been used in Gatiss's Dracula (2020), appears in the final scene.

In an interview with RadioTimes.com, Mark Gatiss said of his adaptation:

"You know, I think what you usually end up doing with an adaptation, say, of an M.R. James story, is trying to preserve the stuff that works best as dialogue, and isn't too chewy, but still has a wonderful period flavour, and then expanding the parts which need expanding.

And also, it's a different form. You've got to feel like you could adapt it, and invent, and make it suit film or television in that way. Otherwise, it's just a sort of static retelling of it."

=== Locations ===
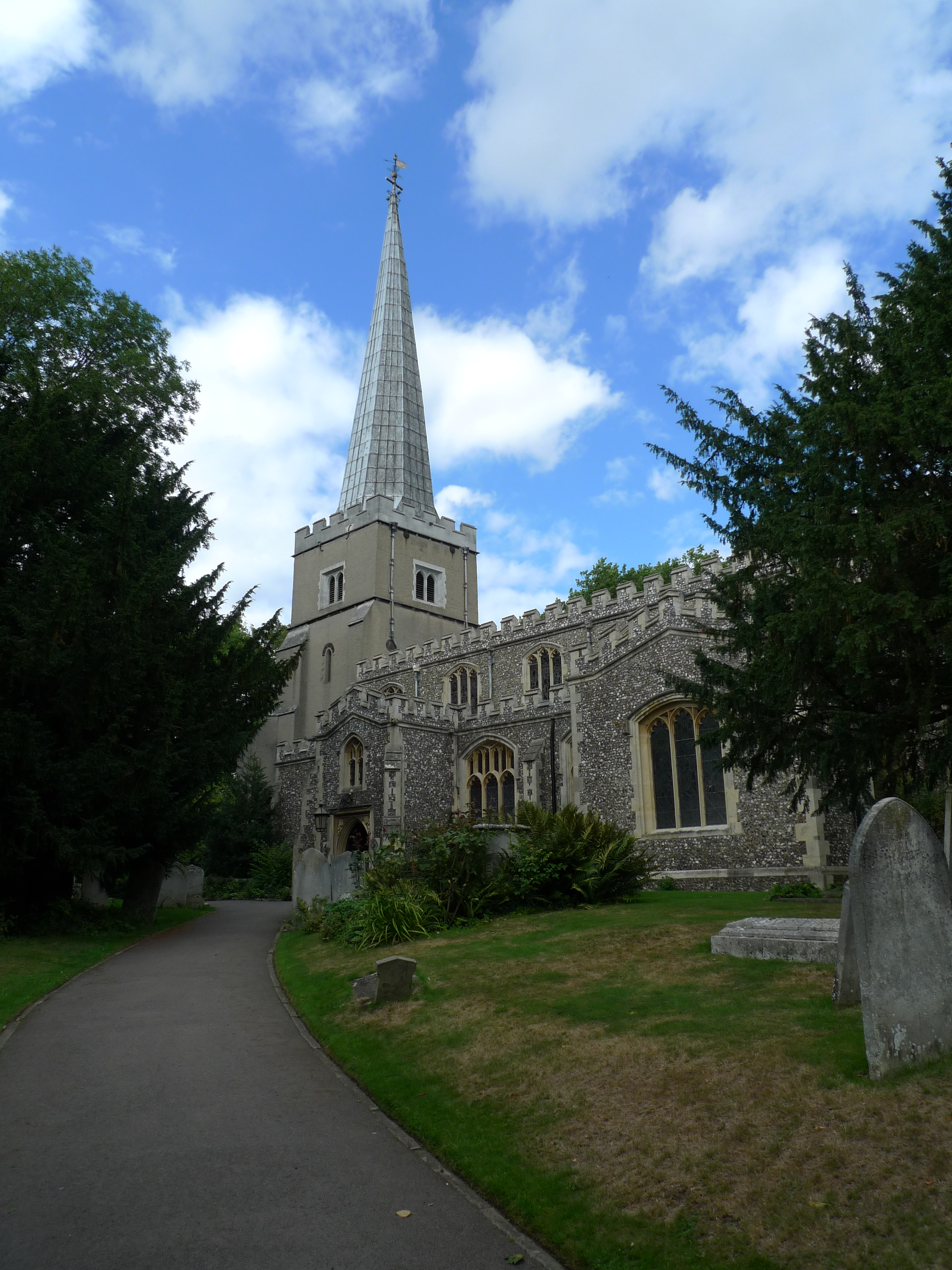
St Mary's Church, Harrow on the Hill

"The Mezzotint" was filmed in early 2021 in Southern England, mostly in Harrow, London. "We were very blessed with Harrow, because it was like a studio," the writer and director Mark Gatiss said in an interview with Radio Times. "I mean, everything was within about a quarter of a mile, even the golf course. That's the sort of creative thinking that is very useful."

The golf course was Harrow School Golf Course in Harrow on the Hill, London. The museum Williams cycles to at the beginning of the drama was filmed at the Chapel at Harrow School. Williams's home was filmed at Deynecourt on Harrow Park, Harrow on the Hill, while the church visited by Williams where he encounters Mrs Ambrigail and discusses tracing his ancestors was filmed at St. Mary's church on Church Hill in Harrow on the Hill.

== Critical reception ==
Benji Wilson, the critic of The Daily Telegraph, gave the production four stars out of five and wrote:

"...there was some genuine horror to be had, as the Thing from the picture turned in to the Thing on our screen and it was a lot more disturbing than anything Doctor Who has come up with this year. Usually the power to shock resides in jump starts, or in explicit imagery or busted taboos. Here, you knew what was coming - the picture had told you - but the climax still had me jumping out of my seat."

Also giving the drama four stars out of five, Lucy Mangan, the critic for The Guardian wrote:

"The Mezzotint (BBC Two), an M. R. James short story adapted by aficionado Mark Gatiss into a glittering half-hour nugget, is an absolute treat. These two masters of their forms can nudge even the most committed sceptic into willingly suspending their disbelief for a tight 30 minutes, especially when the plot runs like clockwork and is as stuffed with actors as a stocking is with gifts."

== Home video ==
"The Mezzotint" was first released on DVD in 2022 by 2 Entertain along with "The Tractate Middoth" (2013), "The Dead Room" (2018), and "Martin's Close" (2019) on a single DVD titled Ghost Stories.
