= Emma Cunniffe =

English actress (born 1973)

- Born: 3 July 1973 (age 53); Chester, England
- Occupation: Actress
- Spouse: Rufus Jones (m. 2008)

Emma Cunniffe (born 3 July 1973) is an English film, stage and television actress.

== Early life ==
Cunniffe was raised in Frodsham, Cheshire.

== Career ==
Her television credits include H is for Hawk, Marble Hall Murders, A Very Royal Scandal, The Lakes, Biddy in the BBC adaptation of Great Expectations, All the King's Men starring alongside Maggie Smith and David Jason, Clash of the Santas, alongside Robson Green and Mark Benton, Clocking Off (BBC), and Flesh and Blood

She also appeared in the sixth series Doctor Who episode "Night Terrors", alongside the Eleventh Doctor played by Matt Smith. She appeared in the BBC documentary The Genius of Mozart as Constanze, Wolfgang's wife. In 2009, she played Carol Boynton in the ITV adaptation of Appointment with Death, in series 11 of Agatha Christie's Poirot. In mid-2014, she played DS Hawthorn in Coronation Street, investigating the circumstances of the attack on and subsequent death of Tina McIntyre (Michelle Keegan).

Other tv credits include Roadkill with Hugh Laurie, and The Mezzotint directed by Mark Gatiss,

On stage, she won the UK Theatre Awards for Best Actress in a Supporting Role for her performance as Hilda in The Master Builder and received a commendation for the same role at the Ian Charleson Awards in 1999. Her other stage work includes Tales from Hollywood at the Donmar Warehouse, The Entertainer at The Old Vic, Losing Louis at the Trafalgar Studios in London and in 2006 Women Beware Women for the Royal Shakespeare Company in Stratford-upon-Avon. She was nominated for "what's on stage" award in 2011 for her role as Elizabeth Proctor in The Crucible at Open Air Theatre, Regent's Park.

She played Nora in Ibsen's A Dolls House in 2011 at The Lowry theatre in Manchester.

She has worked at The Royal Exchange Theatre in Manchester in various productions including Twelfth Night, Major Barbara, Three Sisters, Edward II and The Importance of Being Earnest.

In 2015, she starred as Queen Anne the eponymous monarch and received critical acclaim in the RSC's production of Helen Edmundson's Queen Anne. This production transferred to the Haymarket theatre in the West End in 2017.

== Personal life ==
Cunniffe lives in London. She married Rufus Jones in 2008.

== Filmography ==
=== Film ===
Year	Title	Role	Notes
1994	Cracker	Sarah Jennings	TV series
1996	Cuts	Karen	TV film
1997	The Ruby Ring	Noreen/Nellie	TV film
1998	Among Giants	Barmaid	
1999	Great Expectations	Biddy	TV film
1999	Underground	Caz	TV film
1999	Dreaming of Joseph Lees	Red-Haired Girl	
1999	Tube Tales	Drained Young Woman	TV film
1999	All the King's Men	Peggy Batterbee	TV film
2000	Blue Murder	Vanessa	TV film
2000	Innocents	Sharon Peacock	TV film
2001	The Whistle-Blower	Kathy Enfield	TV film
2001	Love or Money	Samantha	TV film
2002	The Cry	Christine Rearden	TV film
2002	Plain Jane	Jane	TV film
2002	Flesh and Blood	Cath Broughton	TV film
2004	Rabbit on the Moon	Tania Bower	
2004	Undone	Laura	Short film
2005	Cherished	Claire Connolly	TV film
2008	Clash of the Santas	Alice	TV film
2014	MOTH (Man of the House)	Ruth	Short film
2020	Miss Marx	Laura Marx	
2021	The Mezzotint	Mrs. Filcher	TV film
2025	H Is for Hawk	Mandy	

=== Television ===
Year	Title	Role	Notes
1994	Woof!	Minicab Girl	Episode: "Get Me to the Church"
1994	Cracker	Sarah Jennings	Episode: "The Big Crunch"
1995	The Upper Hand	Nurse	Episode: "Second Thoughts"
1995	Dangerfield	Penny Noakes	Episode: "The Norfolk Holiday"
1995	The Bill	Annie Barlow	Episode: "A Quiet Night In"
1996	The 10%ers	Vanessa	Series 2
1996	A Touch of Frost	Michelle Robins	Episode: "Paying the Price"
1996	Hetty Wainthropp Investigates	Chrissie	Episode: "Safe as Houses"
1996	Paul Merton in Galton and Simpson's...	Avril	Episode: "Don't Dilly Dally on the Way"
1996	Life After Birth	Alison	Series regular, 6 episodes
1997	Dalziel and Pascoe	Karen Spillings	Episode: "Exit Lanes"
1997–1999	The Lakes	Emma Kavanagh	Series regular, 13 episodes
1998	Maisie Raine	Cheryl Slayburn	Episode: "A Blast from the Past"
2002	Clocking Off	Kim Anderson	Recurring role, 3 episodes
2004	The Genius of Mozart	Constanze Mozart	Mini-series, 3 episodes
2004	Silent Witness	Rosa Christie	Episode: "Body 21"
2006	New Tricks	D.S. Tina Murray	Episode: "Diamond Geezers"
2006	Holby City	Hazel Keel	Episode: "Just Another Day"
2007	John and Karen	Karen	TV short
2008	Banged Up Abroad	Camilla	Episode: "Nightmare in Chechnya"
2008	Agatha Christie's Poirot	Carol Boynton	Episode: "Appointment with Death"
2008	Place of Execution	Ruth Hawkin	Mini-series, 3 episodes
2008	Casualty	Karen Clarkson	Episode: "Someone's Lucky Night"
2008	Midsomer Murders	Sally Fielding	Episode: "Blood Wedding"
2009	The Bill	Maggie Reaney	Episode: "Fall Out"
2011	Casualty	Detective Inspector Joanne Collins	Episode: "Boys Will Be Boys"
2011	Doctor Who	Claire	Episode: "Night Terrors"
2012	Good Cop	Eva Bays	Mini-series, 1 episode
2013	The Other Child	Emma Beckett	Mini-series, 2 episodes
2013	Jo	Anabelle	Episode: "Place Vendôme"
2013	Southcliffe	Annie Gould	Mini-series, 3 episodes
2013	Moving On	Louise	Episode: "Hush Little Baby"
2014	Coronation Street	D.S. Hawthorn	Recurring role, 13 episodes
2015	Father Brown	Mrs. Mabel Grayson	Episode: "The Truth in the Wine"
2015	Waterloo Road	Ailsa Calhoun	Recurring role, 2 episodes
2015	Inspector George Gently	Anita Magath	Episode: "Gently Among Friends"
2015	Holby City	Elaine Owen	Episode: "Spiral Staircases"
2015	Lewis	Bryony Willet	Episode: "One for Sorrow"
2016	Midsomer Murders	Reverend Melissa Ackers	Episode: "Habeas Corpus"
2017	Unforgotten	Janet	Recurring role, 4 episodes
2019	Doctors	Dr. Janet Fielding	Recurring role, 4 episodes
2020	Silent Witness	Jess Fisher	Episode: "Deadhead"
2020	Endeavour	Rosemary Prince	Episode: "Raga"
2020	Roadkill	Sydney	Mini-series, 4 episodes
2021	The Irregulars	Laura Machin	Episode: "The Ghosts of 221B"
2021	Agatha Raisin	Fran Tamworthy	Episode: "Kissing Christmas Goodbye"
2021	The Mezzotint	Mrs Filcher	Television film
2023	Doctors	Christine Barker-Smith	Episode: "A Matter of a Moment"
2026	Betrayal	Eve Hardy	

== Theatre credits ==
Year	Title	Role	Venue	Ref
1996	Hamlet	Ophelia	UK Tour	
1997	Caravan	Kelly	Bush Theatre, London	
1999	The Master Builder		UK Tour	
2001	Tales from Hollywood		Donmar Warehouse, London	
2002	A Buyer's Market	Rosie Delaware	Bush Theatre, London	
2003	Les Liaisons Dangereuses	Madame de Tourvel	Bristol Old Vic, Bristol	
2003	Twelfth Night	Viola	Royal Exchange, Manchester	
2004	Major Barbara	Major Barbara Undershaft	Royal Exchange, Manchester	
2005	As You Like It	Rosalind	Royal Lyceum Theatre, Edinburgh	
2005	Losing Louis	Bobbie Ellis	Hampstead Theatre, London & Trafalgar Theatre, London	
2006	Women Beware Women	Isabella	Swan Theatre, Stratford-upon-Avon	
2006	The Glass Room	Tara	Hampstead Theatre, London	
2007	The Entertainer	Jean	The Old Vic, London	
2008	Three Sisters	Masha	Royal Exchange, Manchester	
2009	Educating Rita	Rita	Citizens Theatre, Glasgow	
2009	Amongst Friends	Caitlin	Hampstead Theatre, London	
2010	The Crucible	Elizabeth Proctor	Regent's Park Open Air Theatre, London	
2010	Dumb Show	Liz	Rose Theatre Kingston, Kingston upon Thames	
2011	Edward II	Isabella of France	Royal Exchange, Manchester	
2011	A Doll's House	Nora Helmer	The Lowry, Salford	
2012	The Conquest of the South Pole	La Braukmann	Arcola Theatre, London	
2013	Proof	Claire	Menier Chocolate Factory, London	
2013	Wendy & Peter Pan	Mrs. Darling	Royal Shakespeare Theatre, Stratford-upon-Avon	
2017	Queen Anne	Anne, Queen of Great Britain	Theatre Royal Haymarket, London	
2018	The Art of Success	Louisa	Rose Theatre Kingston, Kingston upon Thames	
2018	The Taste of the Town	Mrs. Bascombe	Rose Theatre Kingston, Kingston upon Thames	
2021	Romeo and Juliet	Nurse	Regent's Park Open Air Theatre, London	
