= James Holmes (actor) =

British actor

James Holmes (born 1965) is a West Midlands-born comedy actor of stage and television. He is best known for playing Clive in the 2009 BBC sitcom Miranda.

== Education ==
Holmes trained at The Poor School in London, then did a Youth Training Scheme working in the props department of the Belgrade.

== Career ==
Holmes has appeared in over 40 television and theatre productions since 1984. He has been featured in various off-West End and regional shows, including a run as Lady Bracknell in The Importance of Being Earnest for the New Players Theatre, and various parts in Catherine Tate's theatre comedy show. His other roles include a helpful Citizen's Advice volunteer in two episodes of the TV series Psychoville, and a performance as food critic Floyd Ackerman in Dani's House.

Holmes also played as Roy Silver alongside Penelope Keith in the BBC Radio 4 adaptation of M C Beaton's Agatha Raisin series, appeared in The Bill in 2006, and in "The Six Thatchers", the first episode of the fourth season of Sherlock, in 2017. In 2019 he played Thomas Snell in the ghost story Martin's Close for the BBC.
