= The Mezzotint =

- Short story by M.R. James
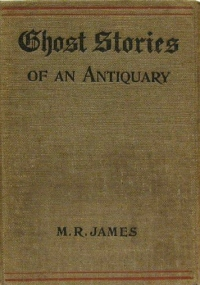
- "The Mezzotint" was published in Ghost Stories of an Antiquary in 1904

Text available at Wikisource
- Country: England
- Language: English
- Genre: Horror

Publication
- Published in: Ghost Stories of an Antiquary
- Publisher: Edward Arnold
- Media type: Print (hardback)
- Publication date: 1904

"The Mezzotint" is a ghost story by English writer M. R. James, included in his 1904 collection Ghost Stories of an Antiquary. It concerns a mezzotint that shows a changing picture depicting a historical crime. It has been adapted many times, including episodes of 13 Demon Street (1959), CBS Radio Mystery Theater (1978), Spine Chillers (1980), and A Ghost Story for Christmas (2021).

== Plot summary ==
Mr. Williams, a fellow of Canterbury College at the University of Bridgeford (a disguised version of Oxford), is expanding the Ashleian Museum's collection of English engravings and topographical drawings. A dealer, Mr. Britnell, writes to him drawing his attention to item 978 in his firm's catalogue; purchasing the item for £2 2s (equivalent to £221 in 2025), Mr. Williams finds it to be an "indifferent" and "amateur" mezzotint showing the front view of a manor house and its lawn in the moonlight. A torn paper label on the back of the mezzotint reads "—ngley Hall" and "—ssex".

Williams' friend Professor Binks notes that there is a figure in the extreme foreground of the mezzotint, which Williams had not previously noted. That evening, Williams shows the mezzotint to his colleague Garwood, who describes the figure as "rather too grotesque". Looking at the mezzotint late that night, Williams is shocked to see that it now shows a figure clad in "a strange black garment with a white cross on the back" crawling across the lawn on all fours.

The following morning, Williams invites his neighbour Nisbet for breakfast and asks him to describe the mezzotint. Nisbet observes that there is no figure in the mezzotint, but notes that one of the ground floor windows of the manor house is open. Nisbet suggests that "it looks very much as if we were assisting at the working out of a tragedy somewhere", asking "has it happened already, or is it going to come off?" Williams surmises that "we're meant to see the whole thing" and suggests that the mezzotint will not change in the daylight.

Williams, Nisbet, and Garwood spent the afternoon together; returning to Williams' rooms at five o'clock, they find his servant, Mr. Filcher, sitting in a chair and starting at the mezzotint "with undisguised horror". Looking at the mezzotint, the men find that it now shows the figure - described as "horribly thin" with "a white dome-like forehead and a few straggling hairs" - striding across the lawn away from the manor house carrying a child. Looking at the mezzotint again that evening, they find that the figure has disappeared once more.

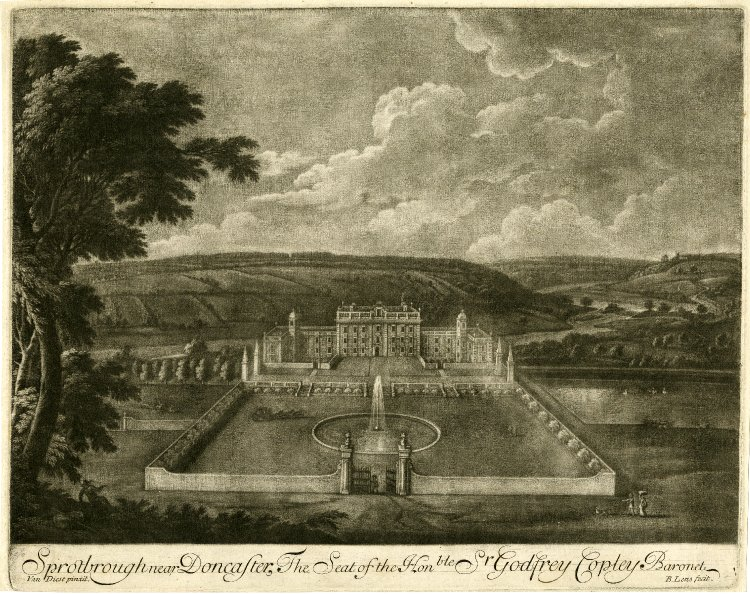
A mezzotint of a mansion house

Reading through gazetteers and guidebooks, Williams surmises that the mezzotint depicts Anningley Hall in Essex. Murray's Guide to Essex states that the Hall was owned by the Francis family, which went extinct after the last heir mysteriously vanished as an infant in 1802. The Guide further states that Mr. Arthur Francis (the father of the disappearing boy) was a talented amateur mezzotint engraver who lived in isolation following his son's disappearance, dying three years later immediately after completing a mezzotint of Anningley Hall.

Williams discusses the mezzotint with Green, the college bursar, who confirms it depicts Anningley Hall. Green notes that Arthur Francis was known for evicting poachers from his estate. After one poacher, Gawdy - the last scion of an old family - shot a gamekeeper, Francis had him hanged. It was later rumoured that friends of Gawdy kidnapped Francis' son to extinguish his lineage as revenge for Gawdy's death; Green notes "I should say now it looks more as if old Gawdy had managed the job himself."

The mezzotint is tested to see if sympathetic ink has been used in it but the tests are negative. It is stored in the Ashleian Museum, where it is never again seen to change.

== Publication ==
"The Mezzotint" was first published in Ghost Stories of an Antiquary in 1904, and again in The Collected Ghost Stories of M. R. James in 1931. It has been included in many anthologies.

== Adaptations ==
On 21 May 1947, a radio play adaptation of "The Mezzotint" by Ashley Sampson starring Martin Lewis as Dennistoun aired on the BBC Home Service.

On 14 October 1954, a television adaptation of "The Mezzotint" by Tony Richardson aired on BBC Television. The adaptation featured narration by George Rose with some visual effects.

In 1959, "The Mezzotint" was adapted into an episode of the horror anthology television series 13 Demon Street titled "The Photograph".

On 20 August 1968, a reading of "The Mezzotint" by Howieson Culff aired on BBC Radio 4 as part of its Story Time programme.

In Paul Theroux's 1975 classic travel novel, "The Great Railway Bazaar" - during a stormy passage aboard a Russian freighter bound from Yokohama to Nakhodka - the author entertains his companions at the bar with a late night telling of "The Mezzotint.".

On 2 May 1978, the CBS Radio Mystery Theater aired The Figure in the Moonlight, a loose and uncredited adaptation of "The Mezzotint" by Roy Winsor starring Patricia Elliott and Paul Hecht.

On 21 November 1980, an adaptation of "The Mezzotint" told by Michael Bryant aired as an episode of the British children's supernatural television series Spine Chillers on BBC1.

On 25 December 1986, a televised reading of "The Mezzotint" by Robert Powell aired on BBC Two as part of its Classic Ghost Stories programme.

In 2006–2007, Nunkie Theatre Company toured A Pleasing Terror round the UK and Ireland. This one-man show was a retelling of two of James's tales, "The Mezzotint" and "Canon Alberic's Scrap-Book".

In 2006, a radio play titled "The Midnight House" by Jonathan Hall inspired by "The Mezzotint" was broadcast on BBC Radio 4.

In 2009, BBC Audio released Ghost Stories Volume Two, which included "The Mezzotint".

On 9 October 2009, a reading of "The Mezzotint" by Robin Bailey aired on BBC Radio 7 as part of its Classic Tales of Horror programme.

In 2016, John Reppion and Leah Moore published Ghost Stories of an Antiquary, a graphic novel adaptation of four of James' stories, including "The Mezzotint" (illustrated by Fouad Mezher).

In 2018, a radio adaptation of "The Mezzotint" by Neil Brand aired on BBC Radio 4 as part of its The Haunting of MR James programme.

In 2021, "The Mezzotint" was adapted for television as The Mezzotint, written and directed by Mark Gatiss, as part of the A Ghost Story for Christmas series. The drama was made by Can Do Productions and Adorable Media for BBC Television and was broadcast on Christmas Eve 2021. Filming was completed in February 2021. As with most adaptations in the series, additional material was created which diverged from the story. A subplot was added tying Mr. Williams’s family to the events depicted in the mezzotint, leading to the appearance of a gory apparition. The adaptation also added female characters, with a subplot involving a debate over whether or not the college should grant degrees to women.

In 2023, a reading of "The Mezzotint" by Sam Dale aired on BBC Sounds as part of its Classic Stories: Tales for Christmas programme.
