= Elliot Levey =

British actor (born 1973)

- Born: 6 December 1973 (age 52); Leeds, England
- Years active: 1994–present
- Spouse: Emma Loach (m. 2010)
- Children: 3

Elliot Levey (born 6 December 1973) is an English actor.

== Education ==
Levey was educated at Clifton College before reading philosophy at Oxford University.

== Career ==
Levey won Olivier awards for the roles of Herr Schultz in Cabaret (2022) and Tom Maschler in Giant (2025). Known for his work in British theatre, he has performed at the Donmar Warehouse, Almeida and National Theatres.

His work has included the 2004 revival of the National Theatre production of His Dark Materials, the 2013 Donmar Warehouse production of Coriolanus playing the tribune Brutus alongside Mark Gatiss and Tom Hiddleston and the premieres of the musical Take Flight (2007, Menier Theatre) and the Bennett play The Habit of Art (2010, National Theatre), along with Robespierre in Danton's Death alongside Toby Stephens (2010, National Theatre) and Don John in a 2011 production of Much Ado About Nothing alongside David Tennant and Catherine Tate. In 2014 he played an American journalist in Ripper Street. In 2019 he played Judge Jeffreys in the ghost story Martin's Close for the BBC. In 2020, he portrayed David Briggs in the mini series Quiz. In 2021, he played in the movies The Amazing Mr Blunden and Smudged Smile. In 2022, he appeared in Good at the Harold Pinter Theatre, which was later shown on screens as part of National Theatre Live.

== Personal life ==
While at university, Levey met Emma Loach (daughter of director Ken Loach), whom he later married and with whom he has three sons. He is Jewish.

== Filmography ==
=== Film ===
Year	Title	Role	Notes	Ref.
2000	The Low Down	Peter		
2002	Song of Songs	Isaac		
2003	SuperTex	Benjamin "Boy" Breslauer		
2003	The Gospel of John	Nathanael		
2004	Nut?	Jim	Short film	
2005	Song of Songs	Gideon		
2006	The Queen	TV Director		
2008	Filth and Wisdom	Business Man		
2012	Energy Saver	Steve	Short film	
2013	Philomena	Alex		
2014	Don’t Miss the Cup	Alex	Short film	
2015	Spooks: The Greater Good	Philip Emerson		
2015	The Lady in the Van	Theatre Director		
2016	Florence Foster Jenkins	Edgar Booth Cunningham, Jr.		
2016	The Chamber	Denholm		
2016	Denial	Roger Levy		
2016	Fallen	Dr. Watkins		
2017	Murder on the Orient Express	Rabbi		
2017	The Master of York	Menachem	Short film	
2020	Waiting for God	Priest	Short film	
2021	Smudged Smile	John	Short film	
2024	Love Without Borders	Robert	Short film	
2026	Prima Facie	Thomas Buckley		

=== Television ===
Year	Title	Role	Notes	Ref.
1994	Lovejoy	Tony	Episode: "Holding the Baby"	
1999	Jesus	Tax Collector	1 episode	
2000	Jason and the Argonauts	Canthus	2 episodes	
2000	Fat Friends	Aaron Ports	Episode: "Fat Free"	
2001	A Lump in My Throat	Shmuley	TV Film	
2002	Sirens	Soco	TV Film	
2003	Doctors	Professor Daniel Dryer	1 episode	
2004	Judas	Eliakim	TV Film	
2004	Amnesia	Dr. Stanic	1 episode	
2006	Beau Brummel: This Charming Man	Tailor	TV Film	
2006	Eastenders	Doctor	1 episode	
2006	Casualty 1906	Abe Goldman	TV Film	
2006–2021	Holby City	Michael Townsend / Pete Golding	10 episodes	
2007	Sex, the City and Me	Jackson	TV Film	
2008	Casualty 1907	Abraham Goldman	TV Film	
2008–2009	Hotel Babylon	Mark Mason	9 episodes	
2009	Robin Hood	Benjamin Palmer	1 episode	
2009	Monday Monday	Slick Guy	1 episode	
2011	Casualty	Tim McCaffrey	1 episode	
2012	A Touch of Cloth	Aiden Hawkchurch	2 episodes	
2012	Parade’s End	Colonel Levin	2 episodes	
2013	Truckers	AA Leader	1 episode	
2013	Da Vinci’s Demons	Francesco Pazzi	8 episodes	
2014	Jamaica Inn	Ambrose	3 episodes	
2014	New Tricks	Tim Dugdale	1 episode	
2014	The Wrong Mans	Sergeant Hopwood	2 episodes	
2014	Ripper Street	Ralph Ackerman	1 episode	
2014	Silent Witness	DCI Ben Solomon	2 episodes	
2015–2017	Man Down	Headmaster	8 episodes	
2016	Grantchester	Laszlo Herzl	1 episode	
2016	A Midsummer Night’s Dream	Philostrate	TV Film	
2017	The Child in Time	Prime Minister	TV Film	
2018	Silent Witness	Adam Freedman	2 episodes	
2018	Watergate	Henry Kissinger		
2018	Black Earth Rising	Consultant Jacob Sayers	1 episode	
2018	Press	Matthew Harper	3 episodes	
2019	State of the Union	Chris	3 episodes	
2019	Peaky Blinders	Leon Greene	1 episode	
2019	A Ghost Story for Christmas	Judge Jeffreys	1 episode	
2020	Quiz	David Briggs	3 episodes	
2020	Life	Frank	1 episode	
2020	Truth Seekers	Publisher	1 episode	
2021	This Way Up	Jim	1 episode	
2021	Endeavor	Ray Jubba	1 episode	
2021	The Amazing Mr Blunden	Claverton	TV film	
2022	Anne	Sir Murray Stuart-Smith	1 episode	
2024	We Were the Lucky Ones	Henry Tatar	3 episodes	
2024	Queenie	Jacob Stone	1 episode	
2025	Bookish	Inspector Bliss	6 episodes	

=== Stage ===
Year	Title	Role	Notes	Ref.
1996–1997	The Comedy of Errors	Merchant	Royal Shakespeare Company	
2000	Loves Work	Elliot	Gate / NT Studio	
2001	Monkey	Monkey	Young Vic Theatre	
2003	Tonight We Fly	Marc Chagall	Trestle	
2003–2004	Beasts and Beauties	The Husband	Bristol Old Vic; Theatre Royal	
2004	His Dark Materials	Brother Jasper / Kaisa	National Theatre	
2005	On Ego	Alex	Soho Theatre	
2005	Henry IV	Westmorland	National Theatre	
2006	On Religion	Tom	Soho Theatre	
2007	Take Flight	Orville	Menier Chocolate Factory	
2007	How Much Is Your Iron?	Customer	Young Vic Theatre	
2008	3 Sisters on Hope Street	Mordy	Hampstead Theatre/Liverpool Everyman	
2009	England People Very Nice	Taher / Denham / Lord George Gordon / Katz / St John / Milkman	National Theatre	
2009	All´s Well That Ends Well	First Lord Dumaine	National Theatre	
2010	The Habit of Art	Narrator	National Theatre	
2010	Danton's Death	Robespierre	National Theatre	
2011	Much Ado About Nothing	Don John	Wyndham's Theatre	
2012	Canvas	Rory	Chichester Festival Theatre	
2014	Coriolanus	Brutus	Donmar Warehouse	
2014	Kafka´s Dick	Max Brod	Theatre Royal Bath	
2015	The Ruling Class	Dr. Herder	Ambassador Theatre Group Limited	
2016	The Mighty Walzer	Oliver Walzer	Royal Exchange Theatre	
2016–2017	Saint Joan	Bishop Cauchon	Donmar Warehouse	
2016–2018	Mary Stuart	Burleigh	Duke of York Theatre	
2018–2020	Snowflake	Andy	Kiln Theatre	
2020	Nine Lessons and Carols	Performer	Almeida	
2021	Cabaret	Herr Schultz	Ambassador Theatre Group	
2022	Good	Maurice	Harold Pinter Theatre	
2023–2024	Cold War	Cast	Almeida Theatre	
2024–2025	Giant	Tom Maschler	Harold Pinter Theatre; Royal Court Theatre	
2025	Hamlet	Polonius	Royal Shakespeare Company	
2026	Giant	Tom Maschler	Music Box Theatre	
