= Nikesh Patel =

English actor

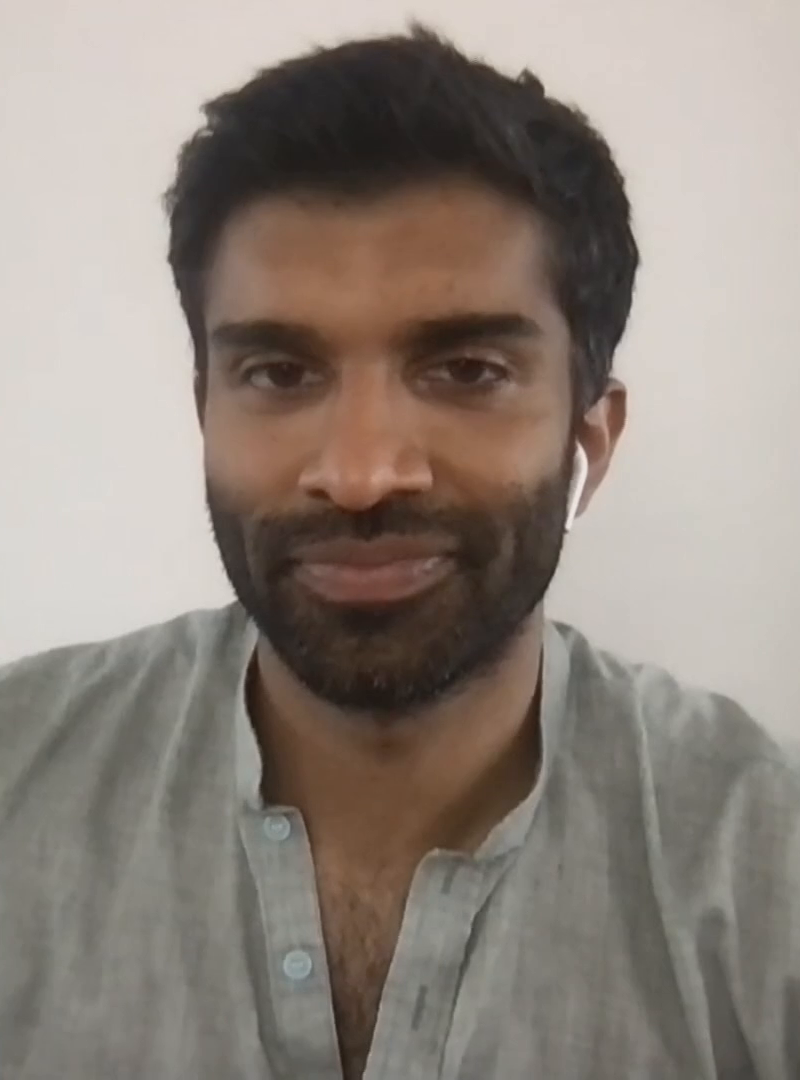
- Patel in June 2021
- Born: Wembley, London, England
- Education: City of London School; University of Warwick (BA); Guildhall School of Music and Drama (BA)
- Occupation: Actor
- Years active: 2012–present
- Spouse: Nicola Thorp (m. 2024)
- Children: 1

Nikesh Patel is an English actor. He is known for his roles in the Channel 4 drama Indian Summers (2015–2016), the Hulu miniseries Four Weddings and a Funeral (2019), the BBC sitcom Starstruck (2021–2023), and the Amazon Prime thriller The Devil's Hour (2022–present).

== Early life and education ==
Nikesh Patel was born in Wembley, North West London. His parents are pharmacists. He completed his secondary education at the City of London School.

Patel graduated with a Bachelor of Arts in English from the University of Warwick in 2007. During his time at university, he discovered acting and played Othello in a student production.

After graduating, Patel went on to train at the Guildhall School of Music and Drama, graduating in 2010. He was awarded the school's gold medal for acting that year.

== Career ==
=== Theatre ===
Patel got his professional start in the theatre, appearing in Anupama Chandrasekhar's play Disconnect at the Royal Court Theatre in 2010. In 2011, Patel was part of the ensemble of the Royal Shakespeare Company's 50th birthday season and appeared in The Taming of the Shrew (Petruchio), Macbeth (Donalbain) and The Merchant of Venice (Balthasar).

He had a role in Rona Munro's play Donny's Brain at the Hampstead Theatre in 2012 and returned to the Royal Court in 2013 to appear in Abhishek Majumdar's play The Djinns of Eidgah. Also in 2013, Patel had a role in Howard Brenton's play Drawing the Line at the Hampstead Theatre.

He appeared in Man, a production of three one-act plays by Tennessee Williams, at the Young Vic in 2015.

=== Television and film ===
Patel's first television credit was playing the character Dan in the second series of the Sky Living series Bedlam. This was followed by roles in single episodes of Midsomer Murders and Law & Order: UK.

In 2015, he played Tanvir in the film Honour. He then had a leading role in the TV series Indian Summers, which ran for two seasons. In 2016, he played Raghdan Aziz in the film Halal Daddy and Pradhan in London Has Fallen.

2019 saw Patel take on roles in two high-profile television shows: He played Mitch in the Doctor Who New Year's Day special episode, Resolution as well as Kash Khan, one of the seven lead characters in Mindy Kaling's 2019 miniseries adaptation of Four Weddings and a Funeral.

Patel appeared in the 2020 fantasy film Artemis Fowl, playing tech expert centaur Foaly. The final stage of the audition process was a screen test in which he had to perform on stilts to realistically emulate being half man, half horse.

=== Radio ===
Patel played the lead role in BBC Radio 4's 2017 adaptation of Salman Rushdie's novel Midnight's Children. In 2019 he played Arcite, one of the two title characters in the BBC Radio 3 production of William Shakespeare's The Two Noble Kinsmen.

== Personal life ==
Patel married broadcaster and actress Nicola Thorp in August 2024, having been in a relationship since 2021 and engaged since 2023. Their daughter was born in January 2024.

The couple appeared in series five of the Channel 4 reality show Celebrity Hunted in April 2023.

== Filmography ==
Year	Title	Role	Notes
2012	Bedlam	Dan	TV series
2013	Jadoo	Dee	Film
2013	Midsomer Murders	Dev Kardek	TV series
2014	Law and Order: UK	Tom	TV series
2015	Honour	Tanvir	Film
2015–2016	Indian Summers	Aafrin Dalal	TV series
2016	London Has Fallen	Pradhan	Film
2017	Halal Daddy	Raghdan Aziz	Film
2019	Doctor Who	Mitch	1 episode, "Resolution"
2019	Four Weddings and a Funeral	Kash Khan	TV series
2020	Man Like Mobeen	Naveed	TV series
2020	Artemis Fowl	Foaly	Film
2021	The Mezzotint	Nisbet	TV short
2021–2023	Starstruck	Tom	Main Role
2022–present	The Devil's Hour	Ravi Dhillon	Main Role
2023	The After	Salman	Netflix film
2025	Picture This	Akshay	Romcom, in Prime video release
2026	How to Get to Heaven from Belfast	Harry	Netflix series
