= George Jeffreys, 1st Baron Jeffreys =

Welsh judge and politician (1645–1689)

The Right Honourable The Lord Jeffreys PC
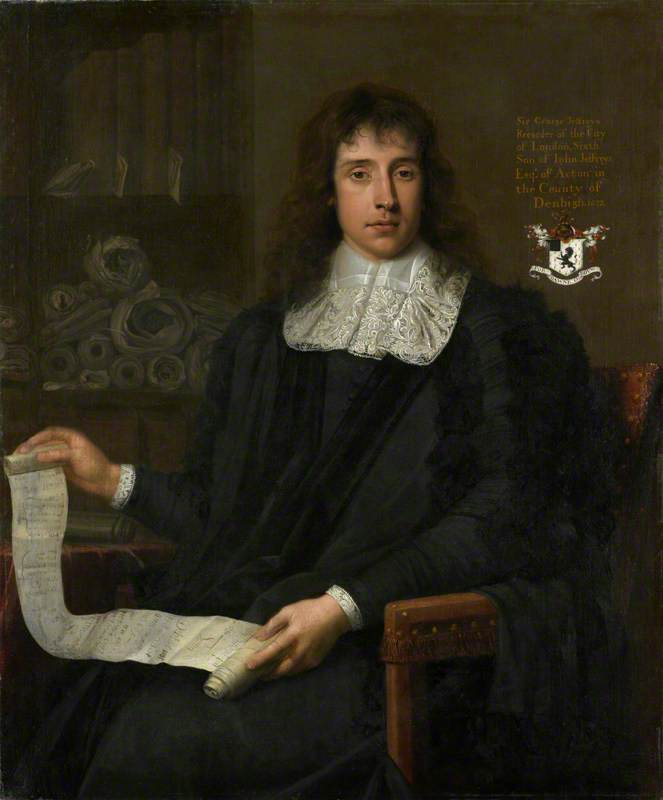
- Portrait of Judge Jeffreys by John Michael Wright, 1675

Lord Chancellor
- In office 28 September 1685 – December 1688
- Preceded by: The Lord Guilford
- Succeeded by: In Commission

Lord Chief Justice of the King's Bench
- In office 28 September 1683 – 23 October 1685
- Preceded by: Sir Francis Pemberton
- Succeeded by: Sir Edward Herbert

Personal details
- Born: 15 May 1645 Acton, Wrexham, Wales
- Died: 18 April 1689 (aged 43) Tower of London, England
- Education: Trinity College, Cambridge

George Jeffreys, 1st Baron Jeffreys (15 May 1645 – 18 April 1689) was a Welsh judge and politician. He became notable during the reign of King James II, rising to the position of Lord Chancellor (and serving as Lord High Steward in certain instances). His conduct as a judge was to enforce royal policy, resulting in a historical reputation for severity and bias, earning Judge Jeffreys the nickname "the Hanging Judge".

== Early years and education ==
Jeffreys was born at the family estate of Acton Hall, in Wrexham, in Wales, the sixth son of John and Margaret Jeffreys. His grandfather, John Jeffreys (died 1622), had been Chief Justice of the Anglesey circuit of the Great Sessions. His father, also John Jeffreys (1608–1691), was a Royalist during the English Civil War, but was reconciled to the Commonwealth and served as High Sheriff of Denbighshire in 1655.

His brothers were people of note. Thomas, later Sir Thomas (knighted in 1686), was the English Consul in Spain and a Knight of Alcántara. William was vicar of Holt, near Wrexham, from 1668 to 1675. His younger brother, James, made a good ecclesiastical career, becoming Vice-Dean of Canterbury in 1685.

George was educated at Shrewsbury School from 1652 to 1659, his grandfather's old school, where he was periodically tested by Philip Henry, a friend of his mother. He attended St Paul's School, London, from 1659 to 1661 and Westminster School, London, from 1661 to 1662. He became an undergraduate at Trinity College, Cambridge, in 1662, leaving after one year without graduating, and entering the Inner Temple for law in 1663.

== Early career ==
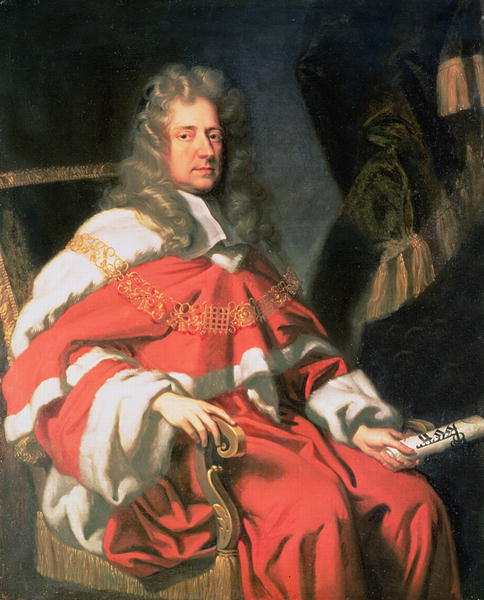
Portrait of Judge George Jeffreys, First Baron of Wem

He embarked on a legal career in 1668, becoming a Common Serjeant of London in 1671. He was aiming for the post of Recorder of London, but was passed over for this in 1676 in favour of William Dolben. He turned instead to the Court and became Solicitor General to the Duke of York and of Albany (later King James II & VII), the younger brother of Charles II. Despite his Protestant upbringing, he found favour under the Roman Catholic Duke.

Jeffreys distinguished himself with black humour, for example noting that two brothers convicted of stealing lead from the roof of Stepney Church had "zeal for religion ... so great as to carry you to the top of the church", and noting that they had narrowly avoided committing a capital offence.

== Recorder of London ==
Jeffreys was knighted in 1677, became Recorder of London in 1678 when Dolben resigned, and by 1680 had become Chief Justice of Chester and Counsel for the Crown at Ludlow and Justice of the Peace for Flintshire. During the Popish Plot he was frequently on the bench which condemned numerous innocent men on the perjured evidence of Titus Oates. These condemnations were remembered against him in 1685 when he secured the conviction of Oates for his perjury at the same trials. Charles II created him a baronet in 1681, and two years later, he was Chief Justice of the King's Bench and a member of the Privy Council.

== Lord Chief Justice ==
Jeffreys became Lord Chief Justice in 1683 and presided over the trial of Algernon Sidney, who had been implicated in the Rye House Plot. Sidney was convicted and executed: Jeffreys's conduct of the trial caused some unease, in particular, his ruling that while two witnesses were normally required in a treason trial, and the Crown had only one, Sidney's own writings on republicanism were a second "witness" on the ground that "to write is to act". John Evelyn, meeting him at a wedding two days later, thought his riotous behaviour unbecoming to his office, especially so soon after Sidney's trial. Jeffreys's elevation was seen by many as a reward for the successful conviction of Lord Russell in connection with the same conspiracy as Sidney: Jeffreys, who had led for the prosecution at Russell's trial, replaced Sir Francis Pemberton, who had presided at the same trial and made clear his doubts about Russell's guilt, much to the King's displeasure. Jeffreys conducted the prosecution with far more dignity and restraint than was usual with him, stressing to the jury that they must not convict unless they were certain of Russell's guilt. A less well-known act of Jeffreys occurred on assize in Bristol in 1685 when he made the mayor of the city, then sitting fully robed beside him on the bench, go into the dock, and fined him £1000 for being a 'kidnapping knave'. Some Bristol traders were known at the time to kidnap their own countrymen and ship them away as slaves.

== Lord Chancellor ==
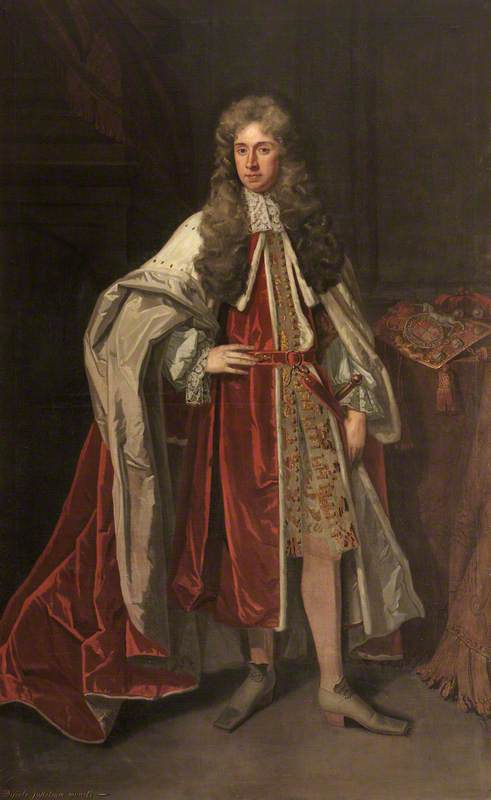
George Jeffreys was named Lord Chancellor and created Baron Jeffreys of Wem in 1685. Portrait in peer's robes.

James II, following his accession to the throne, named Jeffreys as Lord Chancellor in 1685, and elevated him to the peerage as Baron Jeffreys of Wem. In 1687 he was appointed Lord Lieutenant of Shropshire and of Buckinghamshire. His first big trial in James' reign was that of Titus Oates. While there is no doubt of Oates' guilt, Jeffreys's conduct was no more decorous than usual; the latter part of the trial has been described as such an exchange of insults between Jeffreys and Oates as to make it doubtful if proceedings could continue. Unable to impose the death penalty, Jeffreys and his colleagues apparently tried to achieve the same result by sentencing Oates to a series of whippings so savage that he might well have died; although, as Kenyon remarks, it was arguably no more than he deserved. Jeffreys was much criticised for his conduct of the trial of the aged and much-respected clergyman Richard Baxter, but these criticisms must be treated with caution since the actual records have disappeared and all the surviving accounts of the trial were written by partisans of Baxter.

== The Bloody Assizes ==
Jeffreys's historical notoriety comes from his actions in 1685, after the Monmouth Rebellion. Jeffreys was sent to the West Country in the autumn of 1685 to conduct the trials of captured rebels. The centre of the trials was Taunton, Somerset. Estimates of the numbers executed for treason have been as high as 700; a more likely figure is between 160 and 170 of 1,381 defendants found guilty of treason. Although Jeffreys has traditionally been viewed as vindictive and harsh in his sentencing, none of the convictions has been considered improper, except for that of Alice Lisle tried at Winchester. As the law required a sentence of death for treason, Jeffreys was required to impose it, leaving the king the option of commuting the sentence under the prerogative of mercy. Arguably, it was James II's refusal to use the prerogative as much as was customary for the time rather than Jeffreys's actions that made the government's reprisals so savage.

Alice Lisle was accused of sheltering some members of the defeated rebel army who had not yet been found guilty of treason. There was no evidence that she had taken an active part in the rebellion and she was not accused of this. When the jury asked whether her actions could in law be considered treasonable, Jeffreys replied affirmatively. The jury then returned a guilty verdict. She was executed at Winchester by beheading (although the original sentence had been that she was to be burned at the stake). The King's refusal to reprieve her gave rise to a belief that he was taking indirect revenge on her dead husband, the regicide Sir John Lisle, who had been one of his father's judges at his trial in 1649. Lisle had been murdered by Royalist agents at Lausanne in 1664, but the King had a long memory and may well have felt that Alice should suffer judicial punishment in her husband's place.

James considered making Jeffreys Viscount Wrexham and Earl of Flint. James refrained only because Jeffreys remained a Protestant. Despite his loyalty to the king, Jeffreys never hid his contempt for Roman Catholicism; in the last months of James' reign, as the Government drifted without leadership, Jeffreys remarked cynically that "the Virgin Mary is to do all".

== President of the Ecclesiastical Commission ==
As Lord Chancellor, Jeffreys was given the presidency of the Ecclesiastical Commission, a body established by James II under the royal prerogative to control the governance of the Church of England and coerce it. Despite his misgivings and concerns that James was being overly influenced by Roman Catholic partisans, the Ecclesiastical Commission, under Jeffreys, took proceedings against various clergy including the Bishop of London and academics of Oxford and Cambridge universities considered by James II to be overly Protestant. The Ecclesiastical Commission's activities came to an end with the Glorious Revolution.

== Residences ==
Jeffreys, presumably after being granted the title 1st Baron of Wem, took the residence of Lowe Hall in Wem, Shropshire. The extant Wem Hall was built in 1666, although it has subsequently been significantly remodelled. He also had Bulstrode Park built for him in 1686.

== Marriages ==
In 1667, he married Sarah Neesham or Needham, by whom he had seven children; she died in 1678. She was the daughter of the impoverished vicar of Stoke d'Abernon, Thomas Neesham. A story is published, that Jeffreys sought to marry a daughter of a rich City merchant and had a secret correspondence with her, through Sarah, her kinswoman and companion. When the merchant discovered the plot he refused his home to Sarah and George did a noble act by marrying her. They married in the church of All Hallows-by-the-Tower in the City of London.

He married secondly, in 1679, Anne, daughter of Sir Thomas Bloodworth, who was Lord Mayor of London, 1665–66; she was the widow of Sir John Jones of Fonmon Castle, Glamorgan. Being only 29 at the time of her second marriage, she was described as a 'brisk young widow' and there were some rumours about her. She was said to have a formidable temper: Jeffreys's family went in awe of her, and it was said she was the only person he was afraid of. A popular ballad joked that while St. George had killed a dragon and thus saved a maiden in distress, Sir George had missed the maiden and married the dragon by mistake.

== Fall, death and burial ==
During the Glorious Revolution, when James II fled the country, Jeffreys stayed in London until the last moment, being the only high legal authority in James's abandoned kingdom to perform political duties. When William III's troops approached London, Jeffreys tried to flee and follow the King abroad. He was captured in a public house in Wapping, now named The Town of Ramsgate. Reputedly he was disguised as a sailor, and was recognised by a surviving judicial victim, who claimed he could never forget Jeffreys's countenance, although his ferocious eyebrows had been shaven. Jeffreys was terrified of the public when dragged to the Lord Mayor and then to prison "for his own safety".

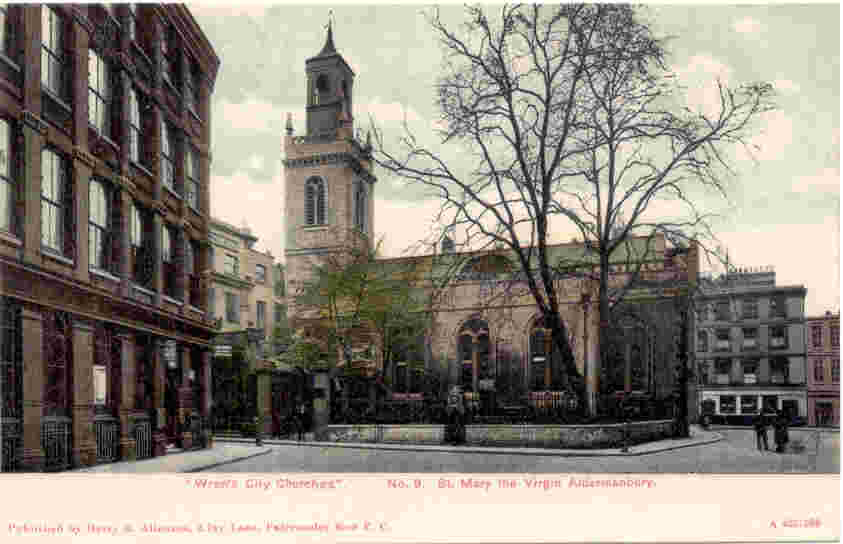
St Mary Aldermanbury in 1904

He died of kidney disease (probably pyelonephritis) while in custody in the Tower of London on 18 April 1689. He was originally buried in the Chapel Royal of Saint Peter ad Vincula in the Tower. In 1692 his body was moved to St Mary Aldermanbury.

In his London Journal, Leigh Hunt gives the following account of Judge Jeffreys's death and burial:

Jeffreys was taken on the twelfth of September, 1688 [sic]. He was first interred privately in the Tower; but three years afterwards, when his memory was something blown over, his friends obtained permission, by a warrant of the queen's dated September 1692, to take his remains under their own care, and he was accordingly reinterred in a vault under the communion table of St Mary, Aldermanbury, 2nd Nov. 1694. In 1810, during certain repairs, the coffin was uncovered for a time, and the public had sight of the box containing the mortal remains of the feared and hated magistrate.

During the Blitz, St Mary Aldermanbury was gutted by a German air raid and Jeffreys's tomb was destroyed. No traces of it remain today. The ruins of the church were transported to the United States in 1966 and rebuilt to its original form in Fulton, Missouri, as a memorial to Winston Churchill. The original site is now a landscaped garden.

== Descendants ==
Jeffreys's only son by Sarah Neesham, John (or Jacky as he was called at home) succeeded to his father's peerage. He married Charlotte, a daughter of Philip Herbert, 7th Earl of Pembroke, and Henrietta de Kérouaille, sister of the Duchess of Portsmouth, a mistress of Charles II and a supporter of Jeffreys in the early stages of his career. John and Charlotte Jeffreys had one daughter, named Henriette-Louise after the two Kérouaille sisters, but no son, so that the male line of George Jeffreys became extinct. There are descendants through his daughter and granddaughters. John Jeffreys retained his father's loyalty to the Stuart cause. In 1701 he was one of five peers of the realm who voted against the Act of Settlement in the House of Lords, and felt strongly enough to enter written protests in the House of Lords Journal. All five, including Jeffreys, were Jacobite sympathisers who felt that it was wrong to exclude the Stuarts from the throne.

== Reputation ==
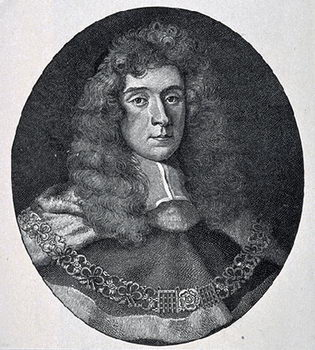
Black and white oval frame portrait of Jeffreys

Jeffreys's reputation today is mixed. Some say he was a personally vengeful man. He had bitter personal and professional rivalries with Sir William Williams. His political animus was displayed during his legal career. He suffered from a painful kidney disease that may well have affected his unbridled temper and added to this reputation, and his doctors apparently recommended alcohol to dull the pain, which may have explained his often shocking conduct in court.

In The Revolution of 1688, the historian J. R. Jones refers to Jeffreys as "an alcoholic".

G. W. Keeton in Lord Chancellor Jeffreys and the Stuart Cause (1965) claimed the historical Jeffreys "to be a different person from the Jeffreys of legend".

After reviewing the Lisle case and contemporary opinion Brian Harris QC concludes that 'Given that [Jeffreys] had to administer a largely inchoate criminal procedure and impose the bloody sentences that the law then required, a balanced judgement would regard Jeffreys as no worse, perhaps even a little better than most other judges of his era.'

== Legacy ==
One session of the Bloody Assizes was held in Dorchester on 5 September, in the Oak Room of the Antelope Hotel. Jeffreys lodged nearby at 6 High West Street, and is said to have used a secret passage from his lodgings to the Oak Room. In 2014 the passage was discovered and was found to be wide enough for three judges to walk through side by side.

After his fall from power, a portrait of Jeffreys was taken from Gray's Inn and left in the cellar of Acton Hall (the family home). When Acton Hall was demolished in the 1950s, that painting and one of his brother Thomas were acquired by Simon Yorke, Squire of Erddig and hung in the entrance hall of Erddig Hall. They can still be seen there. Both portraits are reproduced in Keeton's Lord Chancellor Jeffreys and the Stuart Cause.

== Portrayals ==
Jeffreys was portrayed by Leonard Mudie in Captain Blood (1935), Patrick Aherne in Lorna Doone (1951), Michael Kitchen in Lorna Doone (2001), Christopher Lee in The Bloody Judge (1969) and by Elliot Levey in Martin's Close (2019).

Legal offices
Preceded by Sir Job Charlton	Chief Justice of Chester; 1680–1684	Succeeded by Sir Edward Herbert
Preceded by Sir Fraser Pemberton	Lord Chief Justice of the King's Bench; 1683–1685	Succeeded by Sir Edward Herbert
Political offices
Preceded by The Lord Guilford (Lord Keeper)	Lord Chancellor; 1685–1688	Succeeded by In Commission
Honorary titles
Preceded by The Earl of Bridgewater	Custos Rotulorum of Buckinghamshire; 1686–1689	Succeeded by The Lord Wharton
Preceded by The Earl of Bridgewater	Lord Lieutenant of Buckinghamshire; 1687–1689	Succeeded by The Earl of Bridgewater
Preceded by The Earl of Bradford	Lord Lieutenant of Shropshire; 1687–1689	Succeeded by The Earl of Bradford
Peerage of England
New creation	Baron Jeffreys of Wem; 1685–1689	Succeeded by John Jeffreys
Baronetage of England
New creation	Baronet (of Bulstrode, Buckinghamshire); 1681–1689	Succeeded by John Jeffreys
