= Wilf Scolding =

British actor (born 1990)

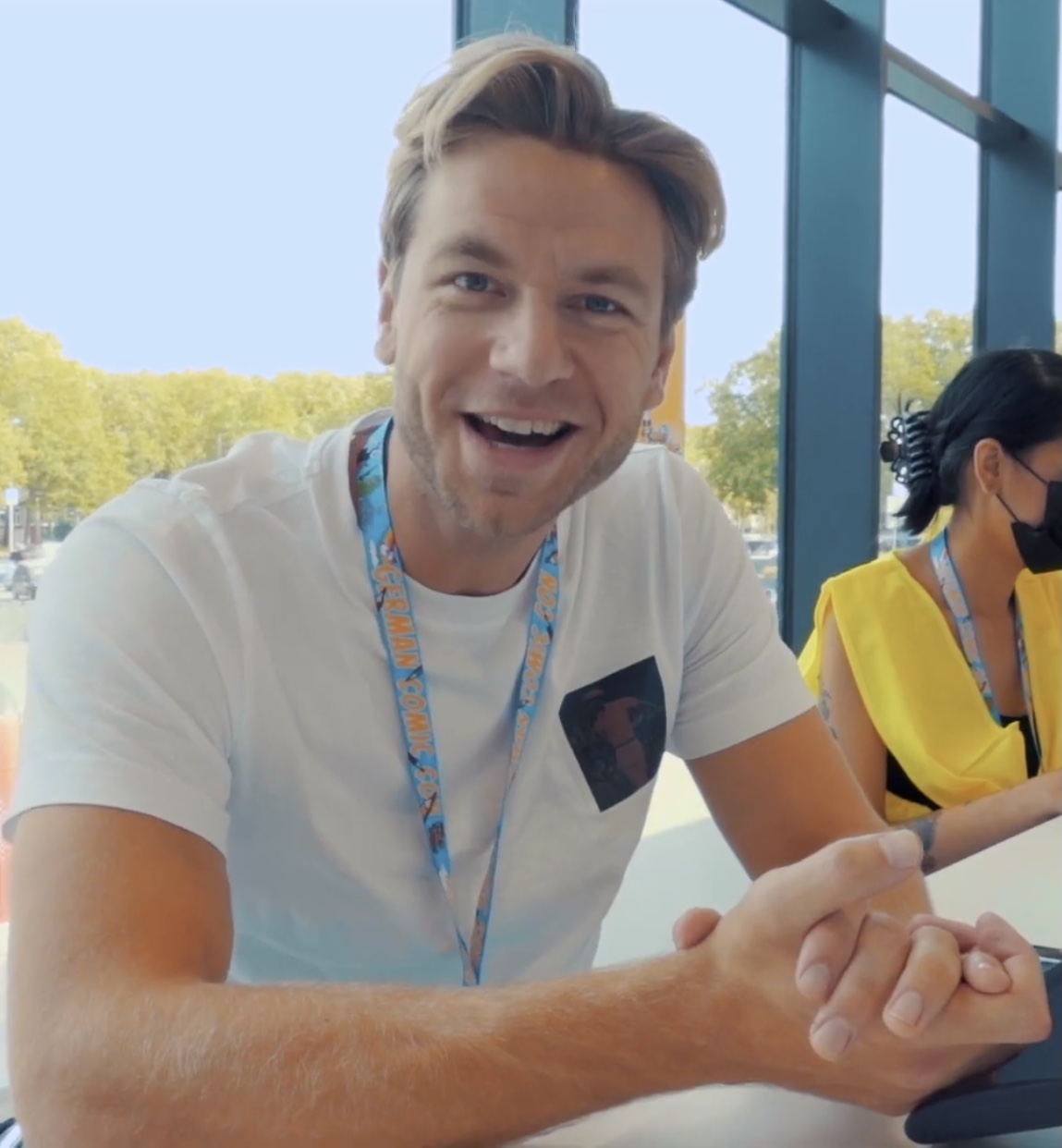
- Scolding at the 2021 German Comic Con
- Born: Wilfred John Scolding; 25 April 1990 (age 36); Cambridge, England
- Education: Kingswood School, Bath, Somerset; Royal Welsh College of Music & Drama
- Occupation: Actor
- Years active: 2012–present

Wilfred John Scolding (born 25 April 1990) is a British actor. On television, he is known for his role in the BBC One drama The Passing Bells (2014) and the Netflix series The One (2021). His films include Bees Make Honey (2017).

== Early life ==
Scolding was born in Cambridge. He attended Kingswood School in Bath. He went on to train at the Royal Welsh College of Music & Drama, graduating in 2013.

== Career ==
Upon graduating from drama school in 2013, Scolding made his professional stage debut in Strange Interlude at the National Theatre. He had his first major television role as Freddie in the 2014 BBC One war miniseries The Passing Bells. This was followed by further stage roles in the English Touring Theatre production of Arcadia, The Win Bin at the Old Red Lion, The Glass Menagerie at the Nuffield Theatre in Southampton in 2015, and A Midsummer Night's Dream at Theatre Royal, Bath in 2016.

In 2017, Scolding made his feature film debut in Bees Make Honey. As predicted by fans of the series in advance, Scolding guest starred as Prince Rhaegar Targaryen opposite Aisling Franciosi as Lyanna Stark in a season 7 flashback of the HBO fantasy series Game of Thrones. Also in 2017, Scolding began voicing Christopher Carter in the BBC Radio 4 audio soap opera The Archers. He has worked extensively with Big Finish Productions on a number of Doctor Who and original audio dramas.

Scolding starred as John Martin alongside Peter Capaldi in the 2019 BBC television film adaptation of Martin's Close. He also appeared in the BBC One drama Mrs Wilson, and on stage in The Madness of George III at Nottingham Playhouse and The Sweet Science of Bruising at Wilton's Music Hall. He had a main role as Ethan in the 2021 Netflix science fiction series The One. In 2023, Scolding joined the cast of Cabaret at the Playhouse Theatre on the West End as Ernst Ludwig and played Captain Vanis Tigo in the Disney+ series Andor.

== Filmography ==
=== Film ===
Year	Title	Role	Notes
2017	Bees Make Honey	Inspector Shoerope	
2022	Fantastic Beasts: The Secrets of Dumbledore	Frank Doyle (Workman)	
2023	Stockholm Bloodbath	Johan	
2027	Panic Carefully		Post-production

=== Television ===
Year	Title	Role	Notes
2009	Skins	Bruno	Episode: "Everyone"Doctors
2014	Doctors	Jared Kilkenny	Episode: "The Boy Narcissus"
2014	The Passing Bells	Freddie	Miniseries
2014	Borgia	Anton van Lalaing	Episode: "1506"
2016	Six Wives with Lucy Worsley	Thomas Culpepper	Episode: "Divorced, Beheaded, Survived"
2017	Game of Thrones	Rhaegar Targaryen	Episode: "The Dragon and the Wolf"
2018	Mrs Wilson	Mike Shannon	1 episode
2019	Martin's Close	John Martin	Television film
2021	The One	Ethan	Main role
2022	Andor	Captain Vanis Tigo	5 episodes
2023	Hilda	Phinium (voice)	Episode: "The Fairy Isle"
2026	Believe Me	DC Paul Stephens	1 episode

=== Video games ===
Year	Title	Role	Notes
2018	FIFA 19	Terry Williams	
2018	Battlefield V	Additional voices	
2020	Amnesia: Rebirth	Various	
2022	The Diofield Chronicle	Castavere Dunnow	English version
2023	Final Fantasy XVI	Additional voices	English version
2024	Star Wars: The Old Republic	Imperial Agent (Male)	Starting with Update 7.5 "Desperate Defiance"
2025	The First Berserker: Khazan	Lantimos (voice)	

== Stage ==
Year	Title	Role	Notes
2013	Strange Interlude	Gordon Evans	National Theatre, London
2015	Arcadia	Septimus Hodge	Theatre Royal, Brighton / UK tour
2015	The Win Bin	Knock	Old Red Lion Theatre, London
2015	The Glass Menagerie	Jim	Nuffield Theatre, Southampton
2016	A Midsummer Night's Dream	Demetrius	Theatre Royal, Bath
2018	The Madness of George III	Prince of Wales	Nottingham Playhouse, Nottingham
2019	The Sweet Science of Bruising	Gabriel Lamb	Wilton's Music Hall, London
2023	Cabaret	Ernst Ludwig	Playhouse Theatre, London

== Audio ==
Year	Title	Role	Notes
2012	The Confessions of Dorian Gray	Various	Big Finish Original
2014	Clayton Grange	Danny	BBC Radio 4
2017	Aliens Among Us	Personal trainer	Big Finish Productions, episode: "Superiority Complex"
2017	The New Adventures of Bernice Summerfield	Mogron / Radio	Big Finish Productions, 2 episodes
2017–present	The Archers	Christopher Carter	BBC Radio 4
2018	Cicero	Piso	Big Finish Original
2018	Torchwood	Alejandro / Courtier	Big Finish Productions, 2 episodes
2018	Low	Brian Eno	BBC Radio 4
2018	Class	Chris	Big Finish Productions, episode: "Now You Know..."
2018	The War Master	First Soldier	Big Finish Productions, episode: "Sins of the Father"
2019	Puckoon		BBC Radio 4
2020	The Sins of Captain John	King Charles II / Tom	Big Finish Productions, 2 episodes
2020	ATA Girl 2	Henry Lloyd	Big Finish Original
2020	Doctor Who: Main Range	Charles Crookshap	Big Finish Productions, episode: "Thin Time"
2020	Time Lord Victorious	Groth	Big Finish Productions, episode: "Mutually Assured Destruction"
2020	The Congress of Rough Riders	Narrator	Penguin Audio, novel by John Boyne
2022	Gallifrey: Time War	Various	Big Finish Productions, 3 episodes
2022	The Lost Stories	Jassic / Guard	Big Finish Productions, episode: "Mind of the Hodiac"
2022	UNIT: Brave New World	Roman Krojač / Professor Ian Fenning	Big Finish Productions, 2 episodes
2023	Doctor Who: Redacted	Drone	Big Finish Productions, 4 episodes
