= Black Butterfly (novel) =

Novel by Mark Gatiss

- First edition
- Author: Mark Gatiss
- Language: English
- Series: Lucifer Box #3
- Genre: Historical, Spy novel, Horror
- Publisher: Simon & Schuster Ltd
- Publication date: 2008
- Publication place: United Kingdom
- Media type: Print (Hardcover, Paperback)
- Pages: 204 pp (hardback)
- ISBN: 978-0-7432-5711-4
- OCLC: 241030365
- Preceded by: The Devil in Amber

Black Butterfly is the third and final novel in Mark Gatiss's Lucifer Box trilogy, which deals with the exploits of a bisexual British detective and secret agent. The previous volumes were The Vesuvius Club and The Devil in Amber.

== Plot summary ==
It is 1953, shortly after the coronation of Elizabeth II. Box is now nearing retirement, and has also been left with an unexpected offspring, Christmas Box. However, he discovers that elderly pillars of the British establishment are meeting unexpected deaths through participation in reckless risk taking and accidents. He tracks the perpetrators to Istanbul, is assisted by Turkish-Geordie double agent Whitley Bey and meets Afro-Japanese gay agent Kingdom Kum, and also that the aforementioned figures were poisoned by a malignant chemical derived from the eponymous insect. From there, he travels to Kingston, Jamaica, where he meets the chief culprit behind his misadventures – the progeny of an old enemy, Cassivelaunus Fetch Junior, who is using a "New Scout Movement" to mask his mass poisoning schemes.

With that resolved, Box is knighted, and renews the acquaintance of Queen Elizabeth the Queen Mother, whom he once met at a party on Armistice Day 1918.

== Reception ==
The Mirror newspaper called Black Butterfly a "wickedly funny caper". CrimeSpace called it "a fun treat".

== Adaptations ==
An audio play was produced by the BBC in 2011.
