= Ian Hallard =

British actor

- Born: Ian Christopher Hallard; 9 November 1974 (age 51); Birmingham, England
- Education: University of Sheffield; Mountview Academy of Theatre Arts
- Occupations: Actor; screenwriter
- Years active: 1999–present
- Spouse: Mark Gatiss (m. 2008)

Ian Christopher Hallard (born 9 November 1974) is an English actor and writer. His work includes acting roles on television, at the National Theatre and in the West End, including the lead role of Michael in a revival of Mart Crowley's The Boys in the Band. He has also written and script edited for both television and stage.

== Early and personal life ==
Hallard was born in Birmingham on 9 November 1974. Following his education at Solihull School and an undergraduate degree at the University of Sheffield, he trained at the Mountview Academy of Theatre Arts on the Post Graduate Acting course, won a singing scholarship, and graduated in 1998. He lives with his husband, the actor and screenwriter Mark Gatiss, in Islington in London.

== Career ==
=== Theatre ===
Hallard has been acting professionally since 1999, when he appeared in a production of Seven Brides for Seven Brothers at the Battersea Arts Centre. Since then his roles have included Sordo in Scenes from an Execution at the Royal National Theatre, Lysander in A Midsummer Night's Dream, Bill Taylor in the Michael Frayn farce Donkeys' Years, Jack Worthing in The Importance of Being Earnest and Judah in Joseph and the Amazing Technicolor Dreamcoat. His work also includes the National Theatre production Great Britain by Richard Bean in the ensemble multi-character role of Jimmy the Bins/ St. John/Felix. In 2015 he played the leading role of Alan Turing in the UK premiere of the Snoo Wilson play Lovesong of the Electric Bear at the Arts Theatre.

He played the lead role of Michael in a revival of Mart Crowley's The Boys in the Band at the Park Theatre and on a short UK tour in autumn 2016. He then reprised the role when the show transferred to the Vaudeville Theatre in February 2017. His performance led to him being nominated as Best Actor in the Whatsonstage.com theatre awards, alongside Ian McKellen, Jamie Parker, Kenneth Branagh, and Ralph Fiennes.

In 2019, he starred in the revival of Closer to Heaven, the musical written by Jonathan Harvey and Pet Shop Boys at Above the Stag Theatre.

In March 2021, he played the role of Richard in the first play he wrote, Adventurous, produced by Jermyn Street Theatre. He has been the resident panto dame at the Towngate Theatre in Basildon, since first appearing in Beauty and the Beast in 2021.

In 2023, he played the role of Peter in his own play The Way Old Friends Do which premiered at the Birmingham Repertory Theatre before touring and then transferring to London's West End at the Criterion Theatre in August of that year.

In 2025, he played the role of Richard in a revival of Naomi Westerman's play Puppy at the King's Head Theatre and also played the role of Orion in Michinari Ozawa's play Our Cosmic Dust, in its first English language translation at the Park Theatre.

=== Television ===
Hallard has appeared in cult BBC TV shows such as Doctor Who as Alan-a-Dale in the 2014 episode "Robot of Sherwood"; in Sherlock as Mr Crayhill in the 2011 episode "The Reichenbach Fall", and on the long-running BBC Daytime TV series Doctors. He played one of the original directors of Doctor Who, Richard Martin, in the BBC docu-drama An Adventure in Space and Time. He appears in the sixth episode of the second season (“Vergangenheit”) of Netflix's series The Crown, as an employee of the minister of foreign affairs.

=== Writing ===
Hallard co-wrote The Big Four (2013) with Mark Gatiss for the ITV series Agatha Christie: Poirot, starring David Suchet. He was the Script Associate on the Poirot episodes Cat Among the Pigeons (2008) and Hallowe'en Party (2010).

His debut play Adventurous was produced by Jermyn Street Theatre, and streamed online from 16–28 March 2021.

Other writing for theatre includes Horse-Play at Riverside Studios, a comedy starring David Ames, Jake Maskall and Matt Lapinskas; and The Way Old Friends Do, which premiered at Birmingham Repertory Theatre in February 2023.

== Selected filmography ==
Year	Title	Role	Notes
2004	Global Conspiracy	Gary Talbot	Video short
2005–2006	Where The Heart Is	Barman (Al)	5 episodes
2006	Agatha Christie's Marple	Reporter Yates	S2E4: “The Sittaford Mystery”
2006	Ideal	Owen	Episode: "The Stag Do"
2006	Suburban Shootout	Port Official	Episode: "Throw Momma from the Train"
2007	The Worst Journey in the World	Clive Wentworth	TV movie
2008	Crisis Control	Michael De Mornay	BBC Television
2008	Crooked House	Felix de Momery	
2009	The First Men in the Moon	Phi-Oo (voice)	
2010	Agatha Christie’s Poirot	Edmund Drake	Episode: "Hallowe'en Party"
2010	Hustle	Vicar	Episode: "Benny’s Funeral"
2011	Doctors	David Moss	Episode: "Life Without Yum-Yum"
2012	Sherlock	Mr Crayhill	Episode: "The Reichenbach Fall"
2013	An Adventure in Space and Time	Richard Martin	TV movie
2013	Agatha Christie’s Poirot	Mercutio	Episode: “The Big Four”
2013	Doctors	Tim Cruikshank	Series 15, Episode 58
2014	Doctor Who	Alan-a-Dale	Episode: "Robot of Sherwood"
2015	Doctors	David Moss	Episode: "L'amore e la morte"
2017	The Crown	Analyst	Episode: "Vergangenheit"
2018	Mary Queen of Scots	Sir Richard Knightley	
2019	Martin's Close	Hosier	
2021	Doctors	Ade Holland	Episode: "Quality Time"
2021	Endeavour	Brian Frussell	Episode: "Scherzo"
