= Count Magnus =

- Short story by M.R. James
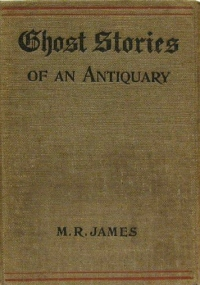
- Ghost Stories of an Antiquary

Text available at Wikisource
- Country: United Kingdom
- Language: English
- Genre: Horror

Publication
- Publication date: 1904

"Count Magnus" is a ghost story by British writer M. R. James, first published in 1904. It was included in his first collection Ghost Stories of an Antiquary.

== Plot ==
A traveller in Sweden stumbles upon the history of a mysterious and ominous figure, Count Magnus.

Mr. Wraxall is an author of several travelogues, having previously published one about Brittany. During his travels in Sweden, he comes across an ancient manor house (herrgård) in Vestergothland and decides to do some research there. He is offered to lodge there, but declines and stays at the local village inn. The local church has an attached mausoleum, built by Count Magnus for himself and his family, de la Gardie. Wraxall inquires of his landlord about local traditions surrounding Count Magnus.

The Count is known locally for being a harsh landowner, who severely punished his tenants if they were late with their rent. Houses built too near his lands often burned down, with their occupants inside. He had also been on the "Black Pilgrimage" and brought something "otherworldy" back. Later, in doing research among the family papers, Wraxall discovers an explanation for the Pilgrimage in a book of alchemical tracts, entitled Latin: Liber nigræ peregrinationis, lit. 'Book of the Black Pilgrimage'. The pilgrimage is to Chorazin and involves a salute to the Prince of the Air. Walking home, Wraxall finds himself at the mausoleum and expresses a desire to see Count Magnus. Later on, he meets with the Deacon and queries him about Chorazin. However, he is evasive towards Wraxall's subject. He presses the landlord of the inn about what Count Magnus brought back from Chorazin and is told a tale about two men who went poaching one night on the Count's lands following the latter's death. One of the men was found catatonic, while the other was dead; his face having been pulled off his skull.

The next day, along with the Deacon, Wraxall visits the mausoleum. The Count's copper sarcophagus is ornate and bears carvings of scenes from his life, as well as a depiction of the Count on its top. One of the scenes shows a man being pursued by a cloaked and hooded figure with tentacles, while the Count watches from a hill. The lid is secured with three padlocks, one of which is already unlocked. Later, on his way back to the mausoleum, Wraxall's mind wanders and he finds himself chanting. Soon, he realizes that a second padlock is now unfastened.

The following day, Wraxall makes preparation to finish his researches and return to England. He stops at the mausoleum to bid farewell to Count Magnus and for a third time expresses a desire to see him. As he does so, the third padlock detaches and the lid begins to rise. Quickly, he leaves, but is unable to lock the mausoleum behind him.

He returns to England safely by canal boat, but feels that among his fellow passengers are two strange figures who fail to appear at mealtimes. He arrives at Harwich and takes a carriage to Belchamp St. Paul. Along the way, he sees the two strange figures once more. He finds lodgings there and spends the next day awaiting the two figures' arrival.

The next day, he is found dead in a terrible condition and a jury rules it to be a visitation by God. The house where he died is abandoned and eventually acquired by the narrator, who has it torn down since nobody will stay there.

== Publication ==
"Count Magnus" was first published in Ghost Stories of an Antiquary in 1904. In 1931, it was collected in James' book The Collected Ghost Stories of M. R. James. It has since been collected many times, including in Sleep No More in 1944.

== Reception ==
Bob Hodges writes that "For Lovecraft and China Miéville, ["Count Magnus"] is the apotheosis of James's synthesis of the ghost story's typical religious and folklore overtones, as well as indirect style, with the weird tale's characteristic madness and inexplicable otherness."

== Adaptations ==
In c. 1965-1966, a dramatisation of "Count Magnus" directed by Frank Sawyer was broadcast by WNYE-FM, the radio station of the New York City Board of Education, as part of its "Tales of Mystery and Imagination" programme.

The story was not included in the original 1970s run of A Ghost Story for Christmas for budgetary reasons. Director Lawrence Gordon Clark wanted to make the story in 1978, later acknowledging; "I wanted to make Count Magnus by M.R. James but they wouldn't put up the money for it, which I felt was pretty shortsighted considering the success we'd had with the series."

On 22 December 2000, a dramatisation of "Count Magnus" by Robin Brooks aired on BBC Radio 4's programme The Red Room. Directed by Clive Brill, it starred Charlie Simpson as Wraxall and Alan Cox as Nielsen.

Beginning in 2012, Robert Lloyd Parry of Nunkie Theatre Company staged a one-man show, Count Magnus, retelling "Count Magnus" and "Number 13".

In 2022, "Count Magnus" was adapted by the BBC as Count Magnus. It was written and directed by Lawrence Gordon Clark's successor Mark Gatiss.

== Influence ==
Horror podcast The Magnus Archives derived its name from James' "Count Magnus".
