= Burnley Savings and Loans =

English independent lending company

- Industry: Financial services
- Founded: September 2011
- Founder: Dave Fishwick
- Headquarters: Burnley, England
- Area served: Lancashire
- Products: Business and personal Loans
- Owner: Dave Fishwick
- Number of employees: 10+
- Website: Official website

Burnley Savings and Loans (BSAL) is an independent lending company based in Burnley, England. It was founded by Dave Fishwick, a local businessman, in 2011.

The scheme gained media attention after Fishwick's early efforts were captured in a series for Channel 4 in 2012, including his call for Parliament to reform the banking system. In 2017, BSAL applied to become a UK regulated bank, "The Bank of Dave", offering an expanded range of products to a wider audience. A film series starring Rory Kinnear and fictionalising its forming was released: Bank of Dave (2023) and Bank of Dave 2: The Loan Ranger (2025).

== History ==
During the 2008 financial crisis, Dave Fishwick felt that the existing banking system needed change as he believed that traditional high street banks were not lending enough money to people or small businesses, and that they were held in a negative view by the wider population, particularly because of the 'bonus culture' that benefited the banks' employees.

In response to this, he assembled a small team and began lending through BSAL by personally underwriting all loans and assessing the risk of each loan by studying the business models and repayment plans of his customers. Since opening, the enterprise has lent to thousands of customers, mainly centred around Lancashire and the north of England.

After six months of trading, BSAL had returned a profit and passed it on to various charities, including local food banks and community centres. The company reported that by 2022 it had given loans totalling over £27 million to thousands of businesses and people.

== Media coverage ==
BSAL has received media attention since it first opened in 2011. In July 2012, the Channel 4 series Bank of Dave was broadcast in the UK and was later aired around the world by various broadcasters. It followed the creation of the scheme as it opened its doors to the public. In February 2013, a follow-up Scottish BAFTA winning episode named Bank of Dave: Fighting the Fat Cats was shown. Fishwick's book, Bank of Dave: How I Took On the Banks, describing the venture, was also released that year.

A film, Bank of Dave, based on Fishwick's efforts in setting up BSAL, was released on Netflix in January 2023, with a sequel, Bank of Dave 2: The Loan Ranger, releasing in January 2025.

== Lobbying ==
Since the first series of the Channel 4 series aired in 2012, Fishwick has continued to lobby Parliament to reform the UK's banking system, which has received support from former Shadow Business Secretary Chuka Umunna MP, who supported the idea of a bank looking to "serve and grow the local economy rather than just for profit and serving the shareholders". Steve Baker MP, former member of the Treasury Committee, has said, "It is towards this model that the world should move".
