= Rory Kinnear =

English actor (born 1978)

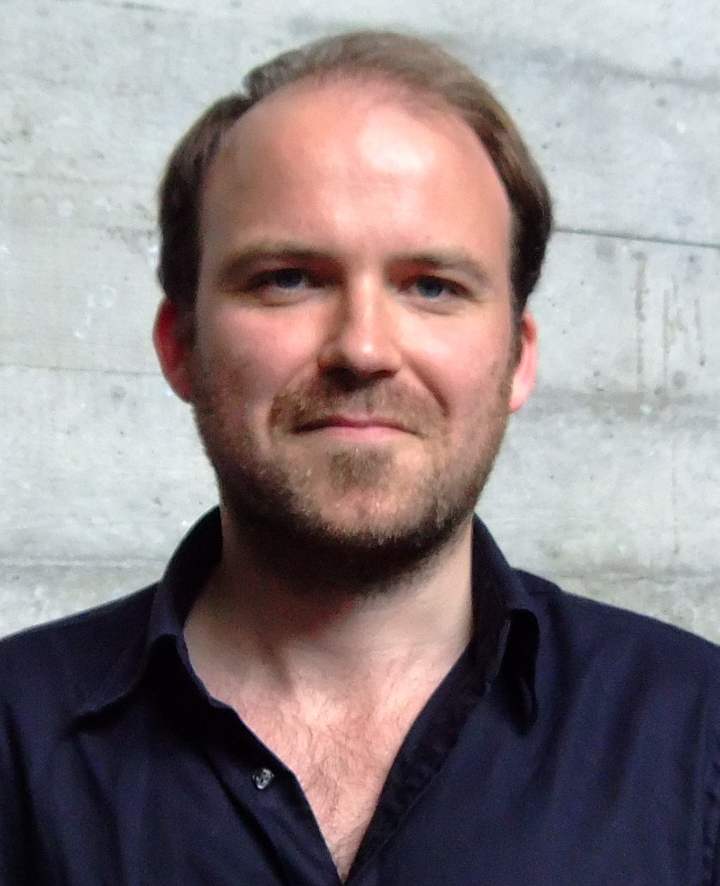
- Kinnear in 2012
- Born: Rory Michael Kinnear; 17 February 1978 (age 48); Hammersmith, London, England
- Education: Balliol College, Oxford; London Academy of Music and Dramatic Art
- Occupation: Actor
- Years active: 2000–present
- Partner: Pandora Colin
- Children: 2
- Parent(s): Roy Kinnear; Carmel Cryan
- Relatives: David Ormsby-Gore, 5th Baron Harlech (father-in-law)

Rory Michael Kinnear (born 17 February 1978) is an English actor. He won two Olivier Awards, both at the National Theatre, in 2008 for his portrayal of Sir Fopling Flutter in The Man of Mode, and for playing the William Shakespeare villain Iago in Othello in 2014.

He played Bill Tanner in four James Bond films: Quantum of Solace (2008), Skyfall (2012), Spectre (2015), and No Time to Die (2021); and in various video games of the franchise. Kinnear also played Dave Fishwick in Bank of Dave (2023) and Bank of Dave 2: The Loan Ranger (2025) and the men in Men (2022). His other film roles include Broken (2012), for which he won a British Independent Film Award, The Imitation Game (2014), Men (2022), and The Ministry of Ungentlemanly Warfare (2024).

Television roles include Michael Callow in the debut episode of the anthology Black Mirror, "The National Anthem" (2011), Michael Baker in the sitcom Count Arthur Strong (2013–2017), Lord Lucan in the two-part thriller Lucan (2013), the Creature in the horror drama Penny Dreadful (2014–2016), Stephen in the dystopian mini-series Years and Years (2019), and Tom Bombadil in the Amazon Prime Video series The Lord of the Rings: The Rings of Power (2024).

== Early life and education ==
Kinnear was born on 17 February 1978, in Hammersmith, London, the son of actor Roy Kinnear and actress Carmel Cryan. He grew up with two older sisters. He is the grandson of Scottish international rugby union and rugby league player Roy Kinnear and the godson of actor Michael Williams. He was educated at Tower House School (leaving in 1991), St Paul's School, London (leaving in 1996), and Balliol College, Oxford, where he studied English. He then studied acting at the London Academy of Music and Dramatic Art (LAMDA).

== Career ==
=== Theatre ===
Kinnear performed in Phyllida Lloyd's production of Mary Stuart, and in Trevor Nunn's Hamlet, in which he played Laertes. He also achieved recognition as the outrageous Sir Fopling Flutter in The Man of Mode at the National Theatre, winning the 2008 Laurence Olivier Award for Best Performance in a Supporting Role and Ian Charleson Award. His other notable theatre work includes the lead in Thomas Middleton's The Revenger's Tragedy, Pyotr in Maxim Gorky's Philistines, and Mitia in a stage adaptation of the Nikita Mikhalkov film Burnt by the Sun, all for the National Theatre.

In 2010 he played Angelo in Measure for Measure at the Almeida Theatre. Later in 2010, he played the title role in Hamlet at the National Theatre. The two portrayals won him the best actor award in the Evening Standard Drama Awards for 2010.

Kinnear appeared in The Last of the Haussmans by Stephen Beresford at the National Theatre during the summer of 2012. It was broadcast to cinemas around the world on 11 October 2012 through the National Theatre Live programme.

He starred as Iago opposite Adrian Lester in the title role of Othello in 2013 at the National Theatre throughout the summer of 2013. Both actors won the Best Actor award in the Evening Standard Theatre Awards for their roles; it is normally given to only one actor, but the judges were unable to choose between them. Kinnear also won the Laurence Olivier Award for Best Actor 2014 for his performance in Othello.

From September 2013, the Bush Theatre in London staged Kinnear's debut play The Herd, directed by Howard Davies. It ran at the Steppenwolf Theatre in Chicago beginning 2 April 2015. In October 2017, he appeared in the title role of Young Marx, the premiere production at the Bridge Theatre. He returned to the Olivier Theatre at the National Theatre to star in the title role in Macbeth with Anne-Marie Duff from February 2018.

=== Opera ===
For The Threepenny Opera (a "play with songs") at the Olivier Theatre from May to October 2016, Kinnear found his "dormant" singing voice for the role of Macheath. In February 2017, he made his directing debut with The Winter's Tale, a new opera written by Ryan Wigglesworth and based on Shakespeare's play, for English National Opera.

=== Film ===
Kinnear portrayed Bill Tanner in the Daniel Craig–era James Bond film series after taking over from Michael Kitchen. He is the fourth person to play the character. He has appeared in Quantum of Solace (2008), Skyfall (2012), Spectre (2015) and No Time to Die (2021). As well as the films, Kinnear also lends his voice and likeness to the Bond video games; GoldenEye 007 (2010), James Bond 007: Blood Stone (2010) and 007 Legends (2012). In 2014, he played the fictional character, Detective Nock, in The Imitation Game based loosely on the biography Alan Turing:The Enigma by Andrew Hodges. In January 2017, he portrayed Ellmann in the Netflix film iBoy. He played Henry Hunt in Mike Leigh's 2018 film Peterloo. In 2022, he played Geoffrey and the other men that the protagonist encounters in Alex Garland's A24 horror film Men.

In 2023 Kinnear starred as Burnley wannabe banker Dave Fishwick in the film Bank of Dave, released on Netflix in January 2023, reprising his role in the sequel Bank of Dave 2: The Loan Ranger in January 2025.

=== Television ===
Kinnear appeared in the 2007 television film Mansfield Park, with Billie Piper and Michelle Ryan. He followed this in 2008, with his portrayal of Denis Thatcher in a BBC dramatisation of Margaret Thatcher's political career, The Long Walk to Finchley, which also starred Andrea Riseborough and Samuel West. in 2010, he starred alongside Lucy Punch and Toby Stephens in the BBC Two series Vexed. The same year, he was the co-lead with Mark Gatiss in the BBC4 TV drama, The First Men in the Moon.

In 2011 he provided narration during the BBC Proms production of 'Henry V – suite' arranged by Muir Mathieson during their Film Music Prom. He appeared in the lead role of Prime Minister Michael Callow in "The National Anthem", the first episode of the anthology series Black Mirror. In July 2012, Kinnear appeared as Bolingbroke in Richard II, a BBC Two adaptation of the play of the same name, with Ben Whishaw as King Richard and Patrick Stewart as John of Gaunt.

In 2013 Kinnear starred as Michael in the BBC sitcom Count Arthur Strong, continuing in that role for 4 years. The same year, he appeared in the Channel 4 drama Southcliffe, and in December 2013, he portrayed British peer and suspected murderer Lord Lucan in the two-part ITV series Lucan. He also appeared as Frankenstein's monster in the Showtime television series Penny Dreadful, for which, he won the Satellite Award for Best Supporting Actor – Series, Miniseries or Television Film in 2014.

In 2017 he appeared in the British miniseries Guerrilla as a Chief Inspector in the Special Branches. and as Robert Lessing from the early days of English medicine in the BBC Two comedy series Quacks. In 2018, he appeared in the first episode of the fourth series of the BBC One anthology series Inside No. 9, Zanzibar, a modern take on a Shakespearean comedy performed entirely in iambic pentameter.

In 2019 Kinnear played Craig Oliver in the Channel 4 television film Brexit: The Uncivil War, and the desperate financial advisor Stephen Lyons in the futuristic series Years and Years.

In 2021 Kinnear played Neo-Nazi Colin Jordan in the television drama Ridley Road and was Edward Williams in the BBC's The Mezzotint. In 2022, he starred in Our Flag Means Death.

Since 2023 he plays the fictional character of British Prime Minister Nicol Trowbridge in the Netflix series The Diplomat alongside Keri Russell. In 2024, Kinnear played Tom Bombadil in the Amazon Prime Video series The Lord of the Rings: The Rings of Power.

=== Radio ===
In 2010 he played Flugkapitän Jürgen Rahl in the BBC Radio drama Slipstream as a disaffected German pilot who joins a mission to steal an alien spacecraft harboured by the Nazis.

== Personal life ==
Kinnear's partner is the actress Pandora Colin (née Ormsby-Gore), daughter of the 5th Baron Harlech. They have a son born in 2010, and a daughter born in 2014.

== Acting credits ==
Key
†	Denotes films that have not yet been released

=== Film ===
Year	Title	Role	Notes
2004	Judas	Andrew	
2008	Quantum of Solace	Bill Tanner	
2009	Wish 143	Wisham	Short film
2010	The First Men in the Moon	Julius Bedford	
2010	Wild Target	Gerry Bailey	
2012	Skyfall	Bill Tanner	
2012	Broken	Bob Oswald	
2014	Cuban Fury	Gary	
2014	The Imitation Game	Detective Nock	
2015	Man Up	Sean	
2015	Spectre	Bill Tanner	
2016	Trespass Against Us	P.C Lovage	
2016	The Roof	Yet Another Fan	Short film
2016	Daddy My	Father	Short film
2017	iBoy	Ellman	
2018	Peterloo	Henry Hunt	
2021	No Time to Die	Bill Tanner	
2022	Men	Geoffrey / Various roles	
2023	Bank of Dave	Dave Fishwick	
2024	The Ministry of Ungentlemanly Warfare	Winston Churchill	
2025	Bank of Dave 2: The Loan Ranger	Dave Fishwick	
2026	Onwards and Sideways	Professor Ridge	
TBA	Learning to Breathe Under Water †	TBA	Pre-production
TBA	Animal †	Harold Laing	Post-production

=== Television ===
Year	Title	Role	Notes
2001	Judge John Deed	Tony Cootes	Episode: "Duty of Care"
2002	Menace	Kevin	2 episodes
2002	Ultimate Force	Policeman	Episode: "The Killing House"
2003	The Second Coming	Father Dillane	Episode: "#1.1"
2005	Silent Witness	Paul	Episode: "The Meaning of Death"
2005	Secret Smile	Nick	Television movie
2007	Mansfield Park	James Rushworth	Television movie
2007	Five Days	Kyle Betts	5 episodes
2007	Comedy Showcase	Rob Black	Episode: "Plus One"
2008	Messiah: The Rapture	Stewart Dean	2 episodes
2008	The Curse of Steptoe	Alan Simpson	Television movie
2008	The Long Walk to Finchley	Denis Thatcher	Television movie
2009	Waking the Dead	James Mitcham	2 episodes
2009	Beautiful People	Ross	Episode: "How I Got My Plumes"
2009	Ashes to Ashes	Jeremy	Episode: "#2.3"
2009	Cranford	Septimus Hanbury	Episode: "Return to Cranford: Part One – August 1844"
2009	The Thick of It	Ed Atkins	Episode: "#3.1"
2010	Vexed	Dan Bishop	3 episodes
2010	Lennon Naked	Brian Epstein	Television movie
2011	Women in Love	Rupert Birkin	2 episodes
2011	Black Mirror	Prime Minister Michael Callow	Episode: "The National Anthem"
2012	The Mystery of Edwin Drood	Reverend Septimus Crisparkle	2 episodes
2012	The Hollow Crown	Bolingbroke	Episode: "Richard II"
2013	Southcliffe	David Whitehead	4 episodes
2013	Lucan	Lord Lucan	2 episodes
2013–2017	Count Arthur Strong	Michael	20 episodes
2014–2016	Penny Dreadful	The Creature	22 episodes
2015	The Casual Vacancy	Barry Fairbrother	3 episodes
2017	Guerrilla	Pence	6 episodes
2017	Quacks	Robert Lessing	6 episodes
2018	Inside No. 9	Prince Rico / Gus	Episode: "Zanzibar"
2018	Watership Down	Cowslip (voice)	Miniseries
2019	Brexit: The Uncivil War	Craig Oliver	Television film
2019	Years and Years	Stephen Lyons	Main role
2019	Catherine the Great	Nikita Ivanovich Panin	Miniseries
2020	Penny Dreadful: City of Angels	Peter Craft	Main role
2021	Ridley Road	Colin Jordan	
2022	Our Flag Means Death	Captain Nigel Badminton/Admiral Chauncey Badminton	Main role
2023–present	The Diplomat	Prime Minister Nicol Trowbridge	Main role
2024	Say Nothing	Frank Kitson	Miniseries
2024-present	The Lord of the Rings: The Rings of Power	Tom Bombadil	4 episodes
2025	Toxic Town	Des Collins	3 episodes
2025	Lord of the Flies	Ralph's father	1 episode
2025	Amadeus	Emperor Joseph	Miniseries
2026	Honey	Graham Anderson	

=== Theatre ===
Year	Title	Role	Theatre	Notes
2002	The Seagull	Konstantin	Royal Theatre (Northampton)	
2002	The Tempest	Caliban	Theatre Royal, Plymouth	
2003	The Taming of the Shrew	Tranio	Royal Shakespeare Company at the Queen's Theatre	
2003	The Tamer Tamed	—N/a	Royal Shakespeare Company at the Queen's Theatre	
2003	Cymbeline	1st Lord		
2004	Festen	Michael	Almeida Theatre / Lyric Theatre	
2004	Hamlet	Laertes	Old Vic	
2005	Mary Stuart	Mortimer	Donmar Warehouse	
2006	Southwark Fair	Simon	Royal National Theatre, Cottesloe	
2007	The Man of Mode	Sir Fopling Flutter	Royal National Theatre, Olivier	
2007	Philistines	Pyotr	Royal National Theatre, Lyttelton	
2008	The Revenger's Tragedy	Vindice	Royal National Theatre, Olivier	
2009	Burnt by the Sun	Mitia	Royal National Theatre, Lyttelton	
2010	Measure For Measure	Angelo	Almeida Theatre	
2010	Hamlet	Hamlet	Royal National Theatre, Olivier	
2012	The Last of the Haussmans	Nick	Royal National Theatre, Lyttelton	
2013	Othello	Iago	Royal National Theatre, Olivier	
2015	The Trial	K	Young Vic	
2016	The Threepenny Opera	Macheath	Royal National Theatre, Olivier	
2017	Young Marx	Karl Marx	Bridge Theatre	
2018	Macbeth	Macbeth	Royal National Theatre, Olivier	
2022	Force Majeure	Tomas	Donmar Warehouse	
2025	Here We Are	Leo Brink	Royal National Theatre, Lyttleton	
2026	The Standard of Living	John Maynard Keynes	Theatre Royal Haymarket	

== Accolades ==
Year	Award	Category	Work	Result	Ref.
2008	Laurence Olivier Award	Best Performance in a Supporting Role	The Man of Mode	Won	
2010	Laurence Olivier Award	Best Actor in a Supporting Role	Burnt by the Sun	Nominated	
2011	Laurence Olivier Award	Best Actor	Hamlet	Nominated	
2012	British Independent Film Award	Best Supporting actor	Broken	Nominated	
2013	Laurence Olivier Award	Best Actor	Othello	Won	
2014	Bafta TV Awards	Best Supporting Actor	Southcliffe	Nominated	
2014	Broadcasting Press Guild Award	Best Actor	Southcliffe	Nominated	
2014	San Diego Film Critics Society Awards	Best Ensemble	The Imitation Game	Nominated	
2015	Satellite Awards	Best Actor in a Supporting Role in a Series, Miniseries or Motion Picture Made for Television	Penny Dreadful	Won	
2015	Palm Springs International Film Festival	Ensemble Performance Award	The Imitation Game	Won	
2015	Actor Awards	Outstanding Performance by a Cast in a Motion Picture	The Imitation Game	Nominated	
2015	Fangoria Chainsaw Awards	Best TV Supporting Actor	Penny Dreadful	Nominated	
2016	Fangoria Chainsaw Awards	Best TV Supporting Actor	Penny Dreadful	Nominated	
2020	National Film Awards UK	Best Actor in a TV Series	Years and Years	Nominated	
2022	Peabody Awards	Entertainment	Our Flag Means Death	Nominated	
2022	British Independent Film Awards	Best Joint Lead Performance (shared with Jessie Buckley)	Men	Nominated	
2022	Indiana Film Journalists Association	Best Lead Performance	Men	Nominated	
2022	North Dakota Film Society	Best Supporting Actor	Men	Nominated	
2023	Critics Choice Super Awards	Best Actor in a Horror Movie	Men	Nominated	
2023	Portland Critics Association Awards	Best Actor in a Supporting Role	Men	Nominated	
2024	Actor Awards	Outstanding Performance by an Ensemble in a Drama Series	The Diplomat	Nominated	
2025	Actor Awards	Outstanding Performance by an Ensemble in a Drama Series	The Diplomat	Nominated	

Acting roles
Preceded by Michael Kitchen	Bill Tanner actor from the James Bond films 2008 – present	Incumbent
Preceded by Edward Bedford	Arnold Bedford actor from The First Men in the Moon; 2010	Most recent
Preceded by Liam Brennan	Henry IV actor 2012	Succeeded by Jeremy Irons
