= The First Men in the Moon (2010 film) =

2010 television film

- DVD cover
- Written by: Mark Gatiss
- Directed by: Damon Thomas
- Starring: Rory Kinnear; Mark Gatiss
- Theme music composer: Michael Price
- Country of origin: United Kingdom
- Original language: English

Production
- Producer: Julie Clark
- Cinematography: Graham Frake
- Editor: Liana Del Giudice
- Running time: 90 minutes
- Production company: Can Do Productions

Original release
- Network: BBC Four
- Release: 19 October 2010

The First Men in the Moon, also promoted as H. G. Wells' The First Men in the Moon, is a 2010 television drama written by Mark Gatiss, directed by Damon Thomas, that stars Gatiss as Cavor and Rory Kinnear as Bedford, with Alex Riddell, Peter Forbes, Katherine Jakeways, Lee Ingleby and Julia Deakin. The First Men on the Moon was first broadcast on 19 October 2010 on BBC Four. It is an adaptation of H. G. Wells' 1901 science fiction novel of the same name. This is the third collaboration between Thomas and Gatiss (after The Worst Journey in the World and Crooked House), and the first film to be produced by their production company Can Do Productions.

== Plot ==
In July 1969, 90-year-old Julius Bedford (Rory Kinnear) tells young Jim (Alex Riddell) the story of two men who made the first journey to the Moon in 1909. He relates that when he was a young man, he met Professor Arthur Cavor (Mark Gatiss) at Apuldram. Cavor had invented "Cavorite", a substance that blocked the force of gravity. Bedford encouraged Cavor to think of the profits his invention might bring, and they worked together to build a cast iron sphere that would fly them both to the Moon.

After landing on the lunar surface and discovering its oxygen atmosphere is frozen into the surface and released in direct sunlight, the two explorers are captured with nets and taken underground by the Moon's inhabitants (whom Cavor names Selenites). Upon their revival, Cavor and Bedford are fed and try to communicate with the Moon creatures, but to no avail. They are prodded with long poles toward the edge of a lunar abyss. They find themselves in a perilous state after Bedford reacts to the threat and accidentally kills several Selenites with his greater strength. They split up, and Cavor remains behind to give Bedford time to escape. Bedford stumbles through various tunnels and comes upon their spacecraft, which the Selenites brought underground during their captivity. He climbs aboard and activates the controls.

Bedford nearly crashes the sphere into the Sun, but recovers and much later lands near the seaside close to home at West Wittering. His hopes of returning to the Moon to rescue Cavor are dashed when a passer-by, Chessocks (Lee Ingleby), climbs aboard and accidentally takes off into space with the hatch open. Bedford does not know how to produce Cavorite, so another sphere cannot be built.

Cavor remains in captivity and teaches the Selenites English and some of mankind's history; he also teaches them the formula for Cavorite. The Selenites conclude from hearing about the warlike nature of humankind that the species is a threat to the Moon, and they determine to use Cavorite to make a pre-emptive strike with spacecraft similar to the one that brought Cavor and Bedford from Earth. In desperation, Cavor communicates his intentions in Morse code to Bedford via wireless, and later releases all the Cavorite produced by the Selenites. This causes the Moon's internal and frozen surface atmosphere to escape into space.

As a result, the Moon's surface is reduced to a wasteland. This is the barren landscape that is discovered by the Apollo astronauts when the Apollo 11 lunar lander sets down on the Moon's surface; a sole Selenite observes the Earth spacecraft from a distance.

== Cast ==
- Rory Kinnear as Bedford
- Mark Gatiss as Cavor
- Alex Riddell as Jim
- Peter Forbes as Dad
- Katherine Jakeways as Mum
- Julia Deakin as Mrs Fitt
- Lee Ingleby as Chessocks
- Philip Jackson as Voice of Grand Lunar
- Ian Hallard as Voice of Phi-Oo
- Reece Shearsmith as Moon (non-speaking cameo)
- Steve Pemberton as Sun (non-speaking cameo)
- Gatiss's dog Bunsen as Faraday, Cavor's dog

== Production ==
On adapting the novel, Gatiss said: "I'm completely delighted to have the chance to bring this wonderful, funny, charming and scary story to BBC Four. It's very rare to be able to adapt a genius like H. G. Wells for the small screen and we hope to do full justice to his extraordinary vision."

The crew mention spacesuits (called "suits") being on board the sphere, but these spacesuits are never seen, described or used, unlike in the 1964 film. Because the Moon has a breathable atmosphere, no spacesuits are needed.

The film ends with a tribute to Lionel Jeffries, who played Cavor in the 1964 feature film, and who died in 2010.

== Broadcast ==
The First Men in the Moon was first broadcast on 19 October 2010 at 21:00 on BBC Four and was repeated on 20 October 2010 at 00:30 on both BBC Four and BBC HD. It was made available on BBC iPlayer for a period of 7 days until 26 October 2010.

Following the original broadcast BBC Four repeated BBC Two's biographical drama H. G. Wells: War with the World starring Michael Sheen as H.G. Wells, the author of The First Men in the Moon. The title of the film is a reference to Wells' best known novel The War of the Worlds.

== Reception ==
The show received generally positive reviews, with criticisms focusing on the story, pacing, and special effects. The Guardian's Tim Dowling found Gatiss' adaptation to have "brilliant" elements, such as setting the film as the 60-year-old "kinematographic" recording and recollections of an old man (Bedford), told in 1969. This "neat framing device" presents the story as "alternative history" which is "remarkably faithful" to H.G. Wells' original story, treating it "playfully, but ... more or less in earnest." He enjoyed the film's "sly" references to modernity, such as airline flight safety announcements, and its "Pooterish approximation of Neil Armstrong's famous words: 'What is this for us, but a tiny footfall.'" Dowling found that once on the Moon, "the drama hits a soggy spot", the Selenite inhabitants "are a little unconvincing," and when the duo are separated, "the narrative runs out of steam," but wrote that "it's worth staying on," and summed up the film as an "engaging slice of time travel."

The Independent's reviewer Tom Sutcliffe wrote: "Is there anything deader than science fiction that has been overtaken by science fact? I suppose there might be objections to this rule, but I'm not sure that H.G. Wells's The First Men in the Moon is one of them, despite the affectionate treatment it was given." While noting the film's "neat framing device" of being set on the same day of the Apollo 11 Moon landing, Sutcliffe described the film's special effects as "not a great deal more advanced" than those of Georges Méliès. In sum, he found the film "very nicely done, but uncertain as to why."

The first broadcast was watched by 830,000 people, the third largest multichannel audience of the night.
