= Our Cosmic Dust =

- Written by: Michinari Ozawa

Premiere
- Date: 2023
- Place: Shinjuku Theatre, Tokyo
- Directed by: Michinari Ozawa

Our Cosmic Dust (Japanese: 我ら宇宙の塵) is a play written by Michinari Ozawa and translated into English by Susan Momoko Hingley. The original Japanese version premiered at the Shinjuku Theatre in Tokyo in 2023, followed by the English version at London's Park Theatre in June 2025, with Ozawa directing both.

== Production history ==
Michinari Ozawa created the play for his theatre company Epoch Man. Ozawa himself starred in the puppeted lead role of Shotaro, a young boy. Nobue Iketani starred as the boy's mother Yoko Usami alongside Igita Natsuha as nurse Saotome, Ryo Watanabe as crematorium worker Washimi, and Kitaro as planetarium operator Orion. Kyosuke Tani also joined the cast as a swing. Our Cosmic Dust premiered at the Shinjuku Theatre in 2023. The original Tokyo cast would reprise their roles for an autumn 2025 tour.

Susan Momoko Hingley translated the play into English. The English-language production, also directed by Ozawa, starred Hiroki Berrecloth purporting Shotaro and Millie Hikasa as Usami. Saotome and Washimi were renamed Tara and Alastair, played by Nina Bowers and Hari Mackinnon respectively. Ian Hallard played Orion. Alexandra Rutter of the Whole Hog Theatre company served as associate director and dramaturg. Our Cosmic Dust ran at the Park Theatre from 2 June to 5 July 2025.

== Cast and characters ==
Character	Tokyo	London
Character	2023	2025
Shotaro (puppeted)	Michinari Ozawa	Hiroki Berrecloth
Yoko Usami	Nobue Iketani	Millie Hikasa
Orion	Kitaro	Ian Hallard
Saotome / Tara	Igita Natsuha	Nina Bowers
Washimi / Alastair	Ryo Watanabe	Hari Mackinnon

== Reception ==
The original Tokyo production of Our Cosmic Dust won Best Work, Best Actress for Nobue Iketani, and Best Director for Ozawa at the 31st Yomiuri Theatre Awards.
