= 55 Days =

2012 play written by Howard Brenton

55 Days is an English history play by Howard Brenton, centred on the 1649 trial and execution of Charles I of England following the English Civil War. It premiered at the Hampstead Theatre from 18 October to 24 November 2012, in a production directed by Howard Davies and featuring Mark Gatiss as Charles, Douglas Henshall as Oliver Cromwell, Gerald Kyd as John Lilburne and Simon Kunz as Lord Fairfax.
