= Count Magnus (film) =

2022 British television ghost story

- Title screen
- Based on: "Count Magnus" by M. R. James
- Written by: Mark Gatiss
- Directed by: Mark Gatiss
- Starring: Jason Watkins as Mr Wraxhall; MyAnna Buring as Froken de la Gardie; Krister Henriksson as the Narrator; Max Bremer as Nielsen; Allan Corduner as the Deacon; Jamal Ajala as Gustav

Production
- Producer: Isibeal Ballance
- Running time: 30 minutes

Original release
- Network: BBC Two
- Release: 23 December 2022

Related
- A Ghost Story for Christmas

Count Magnus is a short film which is part of the British supernatural anthology series A Ghost Story for Christmas. Produced by Isibeal Ballance and written and directed by Mark Gatiss, it is based on the ghost story of the same name by M. R. James, first published in the collection Ghost Stories of an Antiquary (1904), and first aired on BBC Two on 23 December 2022.

Set in 1863, it stars Jason Watkins as Mr. Wraxhall, a British travelogue writer who visits Sweden whilst writing a guidebook to the country and who becomes fascinated by the story of Count Magnus, a 17th-century landowner who was known for his brutality to his tenants.

The series' creator Lawrence Gordon Clark, who directed all but one of the original 1971–1978 run, had originally wished to adapt "Count Magnus" as early as 1973, but the budget was never sufficient to allow location filming in Sweden, and it remained unproduced as of the series' end. Gatiss, who began helming the series with The Tractate Middoth (2013), finally got the chance to adapt the story, though it was filmed in England. It received mixed reviews from critics, who found it lacking as a work of horror.

== Synopsis ==
In 1863 a British travelogue writer, Mr Wraxhall, travels to Sweden collecting information for a scholarly guidebook to Scandinavia. He visits the manor-house of Råbäck in Vestergothland, which had been built by one Count Magnus De la Gardie in the early 17th century. He becomes fascinated by the story of the long-dead nobleman Count Magnus, who, it is said, was a "merciless" character known locally for being a harsh landowner, who branded his tenants if they were late with their rent and who burnt down their houses if they were built too near his lands - with them in them.

Nielsen, the village innkeeper, has tales to tell about Count Magnus, including that of his journey on a "Black Pilgrimage" to the Holy Land "on most unholy business", bringing something – or someone – back with him.

== Cast ==
- Jason Watkins as Mr Wraxhall
- MyAnna Buring as Froken de la Gardie
- Krister Henriksson as the Narrator (voice)
- Max Bremer as Nielsen
- Allan Corduner as the Deacon
- Jamal Ajala as Gustav
- Michael Carlo as Anders Björnsen
- Dominic Vulliamy as Hans Thorbjörn
- Toby Hadoke as the Grandfather
- Linus Karp as Kaarle
- Barry McStay as Erik (as Barry Brett-McStay)
- Joseph Martin as the Shape
- Hannes Husberg as Lukas
- Harmony Nanton as Melissa
- Arron Blake as Policeman

== Production ==
The story was not included in the original 1970s run of A Ghost Story for Christmas for budgetary reasons. Director Lawrence Gordon Clark wanted to make the story in 1978, later acknowledging; "I wanted to make Count Magnus by M.R. James but they wouldn't put up the money for it, which I felt was pretty shortsighted considering the success we'd had with the series." In 2019 Mark Gatiss stated, "The one everyone has always wanted to do is Count Magnus, which eluded the great Lawrence Gordon Clark." Gatiss finally got to make his cut-back version in 2022.

In an interview in the Radio Times published in December 2022, Gatiss revealed that he had introduced a plot twist in his version. He said that the story's narrator is actually Count Magnus, his life unnaturally extended by his deal with the "Prince of the Air" which allows him to narrate his story from within his padlocked tomb. Gatiss said:

"This one needed a narrator, I think, just because there were lots of nice little passages [in the original story]... In the story, it's an Englishman. But soon as I thought it could be a Swedish voice, I thought, 'Well, whose voice could that be?' and then the idea came to me of him [Count Magnus] lying in the tomb, narrating it for his own purposes! So yeah, that's what that came from."

=== Locations ===
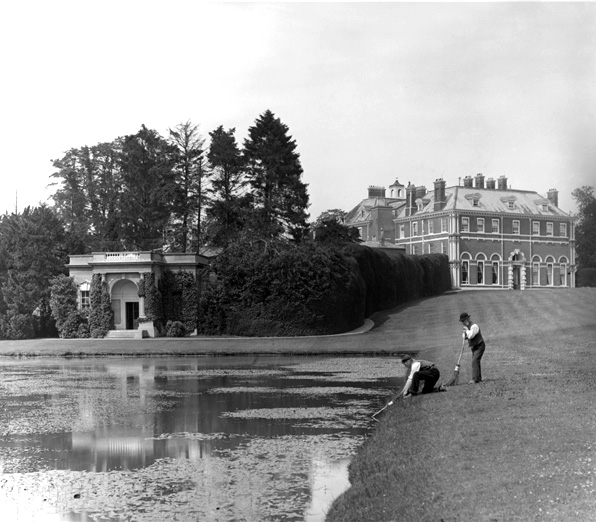
Hall Barn in 1898. The 'mausoleum' of Count Magnus is to the left

Filming locations included the Hall Barn estate in Beaconsfield, South Bucks. The temple beside the house stood in for the mausoleum of Count Magnus. No filming took place in Sweden owing to budgetary restraints.

== Critical reception ==
Of Gatiss's adaptation, Lucy Mangan of The Guardian giving the production 2 stars out of 5, wrote, "The plot is slight, it's far from visually engaging and it manages one paltry jump scare. I've had worse frights from a Misty comic strip.", while Orlando Bird of The Daily Telegraph gave it 3 stars, writing, "Mark Gatiss's MR James ghost stories have become a pleasurable Christmas TV staple, even if this offering tickled rather than thrilled."
