= Lucifer Box =

- Lucifer Box
- First appearance: The Vesuvius Club
- Last appearance: Black Butterfly
- Created by: Mark Gatiss

In-universe information
- Gender: Male
- Occupation: Portrait painter Secret agent
- Children: Christmas Box (son)
- Relatives: Pandora Box (sister)
- Nationality: British

Lucifer Box is a fictional character created by Mark Gatiss.

== Appearances ==
- The Vesuvius Club (2004)
  - The Vesuvius Club: Graphic Edition (2005)
- The Devil in Amber (2006)
- Black Butterfly (2008)

== Persona ==
Box is a flamboyant, dashing and elegant figure who displays a prominent sense of fashion. A portrait painter to the rich and influential, he uses this as cover for his activities as a secret agent (in the world of the novels, the Royal Academy is the front for Britain's secret services). Box is a charming but ruthless figure, who combines a sardonic sense of humour with a cold determination to kill when necessary.

He lives at Number 9 Downing Street (next door to the Prime Minister, famously at Number 10), and presumably two doors down from the Chancellor of the Exchequer. (Historical note: No. 9 Downing Street is behind the Cabinet Office building at 70 Whitehall and has now been absorbed into that office complex.)

Box is also openly bisexual, and is equally comfortable seducing both male and female partners.

Lucifer Box was Charles Dickens's nickname for his daughter Kate, given to her on account of her fiery temper.

== Family ==
He has a sister called Pandora and a servant called Delilah, and in the third novel, The Black Butterfly, has a son called Christmas.
