= Bank of Dave (film) =

- Film poster
- Directed by: Chris Foggin
- Written by: Piers Ashworth
- Based on: Life of Dave Fishwick
- Produced by: Matt Williams; Karl Hall; Piers Tempest
- Starring: Rory Kinnear; Joel Fry; Phoebe Dynevor; Hugh Bonneville; Paul Kaye; Jo Hartley; Cathy Tyson
- Cinematography: Mike Stern Sterzynski
- Edited by: Martina Zamolo
- Music by: Christian Henson
- Production companies: Tempo Productions Limited; Future Artists Entertainment; Ingenious Media; Rojovid Films
- Distributed by: Netflix; William Morris Endeavor (WME) Entertainment
- Release date: 16 January 2023
- Running time: 107 minutes
- Country: United Kingdom
- Language: English

Bank of Dave is a 2023 British biographical comedy-drama film directed by Chris Foggin, written by Piers Ashworth and produced by Matt Williams, Karl Hall and Piers Tempest. It stars Joel Fry, Phoebe Dynevor, Rory Kinnear, Hugh Bonneville, Paul Kaye, Jo Hartley and Cathy Tyson.

It was released in the United Kingdom on 16 January 2023 by Netflix. A sequel, Bank of Dave 2: The Loan Ranger, was released on 10 January 2025.

The film is based on the real-life experiences of Dave Fishwick. It follows the story of a Burnley self-made millionaire who struggles to set up a community bank to help the town's local businesses to thrive. To do so, he must battle London's elite financial institutions and compete for the first banking licence in more than 150 years.

== Plot ==
Dave Fishwick, a successful businessman in Burnley, a depressed town in northern England, began lending his own money to customers, local families and businesses who were unable to make payments or obtain new loans from the same banks that caused a recession. No one failed to pay him back, and when some made money and asked him to invest it for them, he decides to get accredited by creating a community bank called the Bank of Dave, whose profits would go to charity.

Hugh Stockwell, a London solicitor, is sent to Burnley by his firm to provide Dave with legal advice on preparing an application to the Financial Regulations Board. Knowing no new bank has been approved in the UK for over a century, Hugh attempts to dissuade Dave from pursuing the project. Dave admits he expects the application to be rejected which will force the Board to explain its decision publicly. Hugh submits Dave's application with the support of his boss Clarence who warns him to expect the board to fight dirty.

Alexandra Ashforth, Dave's niece, is a physician trying to obtain funding for a walk-in clinic to relieve pressure on the local healthcare providers. She meets Hugh in embarrassing circumstances but befriends him and he confides he feels more relaxed in Burnley than in London.

Dave is arrested on a charge of illegal money lending for one of his previous loans. He had intended it as payment for a friend's funeral but the widow insisted it be a loan, and Dave used one of his business's forms for that purpose. A conviction will make him ineligible to run a bank. Alexandra learns from the local police that a team sent from London made the arrest, based on a complaint from Sir Charles Denbigh, one of the UK's most senior bankers. Hugh convinces a local magistrates' court to dismiss the case as malicious prosecution.

Hugh and Dave meet with the board and are surprised to learn the application was accepted on the condition Dave deposits £12 million within 90 days. The board expects Dave won't fulfil the requirement and the project will fail. Insisting that the bank be funded by local sources, Dave returns to Burnley. Hugh is offered lucrative work for a major client on a condition of exclusivity, and learns the assignment came via Denbigh, in order to preclude his valuable work for the Bank of Dave, helping ensure its failure. Hugh accepts reluctantly, aware he's been bought off, and returns to Burnley for a funeral. Dave tells him he will not be able to raise the full £12 million, and Hugh suggests making up the shortfall by holding a benefit concert featuring rock group Def Leppard. When the concert proceeds fall short, Hugh borrows £1 million from Clarence. The Bank of Dave opens, facilitating the creation of local jobs and funding a new walk-in clinic. Hugh tells Alexandra he is moving to Burnley to be with her.

== Cast ==
- Rory Kinnear as Dave Fishwick
- Phoebe Dynevor as Alexandra Ashforth
- Joel Fry as Hugh Stockwell
- Hugh Bonneville as Sir Charles Denbigh
- Angus Wright as Clarence
- Paul Kaye as Rick Purdey
- Jo Hartley as Nicola Fishwick
- Cathy Tyson as Maureen Clayton
- Naomi Battrick as Henrietta
- Florence Hall as Meghan
- Drew Cain as Prosecutor
- Grant Crookes as Press
- Joanne James as Pub Patron
- Amanda Marchant as Pub Patron

The film includes cameos by band Def Leppard, the-then Burnley FC manager Sean Dyche, and real-life Bank of Dave chief financial officer David Henshaw.

== Production ==
Netflix acquired the film rights of Bank of Dave, with Piers Ashworth writing and Chris Foggin directing the film under the production companies Tempo Productions Limited, Future Artists Entertainment, Ingenious Media and Rojovid Films. Pre-production began on 8 January 2022 and filming commenced on 28 February 2022. The film was in post-production between 18 April 2022 and 27 September 2022, and the film was completed on 22 December 2022.

Although some scenes were filmed in and around Burnley, most of the production was filmed in Bradford, Leeds and Wakefield in Yorkshire, including City Hall in Bradford, Production Park in Wakefield, with most of the pub and cafes scenes filmed in Leeds.

== Reception ==
On the review aggregator website Rotten Tomatoes, 86% of 35 critics' reviews are positive, with an average rating of 6.3/10. The website's consensus reads: "A feel-good underdog story loosely rooted in real events, Bank of Dave may not be the most memorable movie of its type, but it's got sweetness and charm to spare."

Writing in The Guardian, Cath Clarke judged that, "Rory Kinnear is brilliant as Fishwick, who made his fortune selling vans and minibuses but has never forgotten his roots", adding that, "Kinnear gives the character a winning mix of down-to-earth blokiness with a rags-to-riches flamboyance (and a bit of ego to match the flash car)". However, Clarke found that "[t]he rest of the characters feel as if they might have been generated by an algorithm" although she noted that "Hugh Bonneville gives good sneer as a fatcat banker". Overall, she decided, "It’s a film with a decent bit of charm, and it’s hard to argue with the greed-is-bad message. [...] But an artificial taste ruins a fair few scenes".

== True story ==
The film gives a disclaimer at the start saying it is "true(ish)". While the basic story and some of the locations are true (scenes were even filmed in Dave Fishwick's own home), much of the film is fictional.

- The lawyer (actually two lawyers, Keith Arrowsmith and Chris Moss) were based in Manchester and both married already
- There was no senior banker, "Sir Charles Denbigh" in the film, who tipped off the Burnley police to bring a prosecution
- The rock band Def Leppard did not perform at a fund-raising concert at Turf Moor. The band flew from the US just to film their cameo in the film.
- A true bank has not yet been established and is actually Burnley Savings and Loans, a legal peer-to-peer lender. The capital demanded by the FSA was never raised and so the company is still in the process of getting a banking licence. Above the door is a sign saying "Bank on Dave", which avoids claiming that it is a bank,

== Sequel ==
A sequel film, Bank of Dave 2: The Loan Ranger, was released on 10 January 2025, with Kinnear reprising his role.
