= The Way Old Friends Do (play) =

2023 play by Ian Hallard

- Original language: English
- Written by: Ian Hallard
- Genre: Comedy

Premiere
- Date: 17 February 2023
- Place: The Studio, Birmingham Repertory Theatre

The Way Old Friends Do is a play by Ian Hallard. It is a comedy that tells the story of the world's first drag ABBA tribute band, formed by two old schoolfriends who meet again by chance.

== Plot ==
The play follows the ups and downs in the friendship of Peter and Edward, who were at school together in Birmingham in the 1980s. Edward came out to Peter as gay, and Peter as an ABBA fan. They find each other again after twenty years of estrangement and book a one-off gig at the local theatre as a drag ABBA tribute band. They decide to play Frida and Agnetha, and recruit wannabe actress Jodie and eccentric rehearsal pianist Mrs Campbell as Björn and Benny. Stage manager Sally is the final member of the team.

Avid Australian fan, Christian, convinces them to pursue the idea, and they embark on a life on the road. However Christian's romantic involvement with Edward leads to the breakdown of his friendship with Peter.

== Production history ==
=== UK Tour (2023) ===
The play made its world premiere in The Studio at the Birmingham Repertory Theatre on 17 February 2023, before touring the UK. The production was directed by Mark Gatiss.

=== West End (2023) ===
The play transferred to the Criterion Theatre in London's West End from 17 August until 9 September 2023.

== Cast and characters ==
| Character | UK Tour | West End |
| Character | 2023 | |
|---|---|---|
| Sally | Donna Berlin | Donna Berlin |
| Edward | James Bradshaw | Anton Tweedale |
| Mrs Campbell | Sara Crowe | Sara Crowe |
| Peter | Ian Hallard | Ian Hallard |
| Christian | Andrew Horton | Andrew Horton |
| Jodie | Rose Shalloo | Rose Shalloo |
| Voice of Nan | Miriam Margolyes | Miriam Margolyes |
| Voice of Radio DJ | Paul O'Grady | Paul O'Grady |

== Critical reception ==
The Guardian's Arifa Akbar and The Arts Desk's Aleks Sierz both gave The Way Old Friends Do 3 out of 5 stars, while the Evening Standard's Nick Curtis gave it 2 out of 5 stars. WhatsOnStage.com's Diane Parkes gave the play 4 out of 5 stars, and Libby Purves gave it 4 out of 5 stars, describing it as "ABBAsolutely a delight" and stating that "you're a curmudgeon if you don't warm to it."
