= A History of Horror =

- Written by: Mark Gatiss
- Directed by: John Das (2 episodes); Rachel Jardine (1 episode)
- Starring: Mark Gatiss
- Country of origin: United Kingdom
- Original language: English
- No. of series: 1
- No. of episodes: 3

Production
- Executive producer: Michael Poole
- Producers: Rachel Jardine; John Das (series producer)
- Running time: 60 minutes
- Production company: BBC Productions

Original release
- Network: BBC Four
- Release: 11 October – 25 October 2010

A History of Horror (also known as A History of Horror with Mark Gatiss) is a 2010 three-part documentary series made for the BBC by British writer and actor Mark Gatiss. It is a personal exploration of the history of horror film, inspired by Gatiss's lifelong enthusiasm for the genre.

The documentary was directed by John Das (episodes one and three) and Rachel Jardine (episode two); series consultant was actor and film historian Jonathan Rigby. The series was initially broadcast in the United Kingdom on BBC Four from 11 to 25 October 2010. Each of the three episodes lasted 60 minutes.

It received strong reviews from the British press, the Irish press and independent review sites.

== Episodes ==
=== "Frankenstein Goes To Hollywood" ===
In the first episode, Gatiss explores the Golden Age of Hollywood horror, or the Universal era, the 1920s to 1940s. He looks at the silent film The Phantom of the Opera (1925), starring Lon Chaney, the first great horror talkie Dracula (1931), starring Béla Lugosi, and the later release of James Whale's Frankenstein (1931), featuring Boris Karloff. He focuses in particular on Son of Frankenstein (1939), a personal favourite that he feels has been neglected.

The episode includes interviews with John Carpenter, Sara Karloff, Gloria Stuart, Carla Laemmle, Donnie Dunagan, and Sheila Wynn (Lugosi's co-star in a 1951 Dracula tour).

=== "Home Counties Horror" ===
The second episode focuses on the British Hammer Films of the 1950s and 1960s, which inspired Gatiss' childhood passion for horror. He meets key figures from Hammer to discuss the series of Frankenstein and Dracula films which made stars of Christopher Lee and Peter Cushing, both of whom Gatiss argues are underrated talents. He also identifies a short-lived subgenre of British folk horror drawing on paganism and folklore, including Witchfinder General (1968), his personal favourite Blood on Satan's Claw (1971) and The Wicker Man (1973).

This episode includes interviews with writer-producer Anthony Hinds, writer-director Jimmy Sangster, director Roy Ward Baker, Barbara Steele, star of Black Sunday (1960), director-producer Roger Corman, director Piers Haggard, John Carpenter again, and actors Barbara Shelley and David Warner. Also included are archive interviews with Peter Cushing and Vincent Price.

=== "The American Scream" ===
In the third and final episode, Gatiss looks at American horror movies of the late 1960s and 1970s, including Night of the Living Dead (1968) and The Texas Chain Saw Massacre (1974). As well as the emergence of slasher films, Gatiss examines the other great horror film trend of the era, the theme of Satanism and demonic possession in films such as Rosemary's Baby (1968), The Exorcist (1973) and The Omen (1976).

This episode includes interviews with writer David Seltzer and directors Tobe Hooper and George A. Romero, who also made Martin (1978), another personal favourite which Gatiss considers neglected. Gatiss meets David Warner, Barbara Steele and John Carpenter again, accompanying Carpenter on a tour of the set locations for Halloween (1978). He also visits the Bates Motel, the set location for Alfred Hitchcock's Psycho (1960).

== Horror Europa ==
The series was followed in October 2012 by Horror Europa, a 90-minute exploration of European horror that reunited Gatiss with director John Das and consultant Jonathan Rigby.

Gatiss' interviewees included Harry Kümel, Annette Chaton (daughter of Thomas Narcejac), Édith Scob, Fabrizio Bava (grandson of Mario Bava), Dario Argento, Narciso Ibáñez Serrador, Jorge Grau, Guillermo del Toro, and Barbara Steele. Among films covered were Daughters of Darkness, The Cabinet of Dr. Caligari, Nosferatu, The Hands of Orlac, Les Diaboliques, Eyes Without a Face, Black Sabbath, Blood and Black Lace, The Bird with the Crystal Plumage, Suspiria, La residencia, Who Can Kill a Child?, The Living Dead at Manchester Morgue, The Devil's Backbone, Pan's Labyrinth, and Shivers.

The documentary was previewed at London's National Film Theatre on 28 October (followed by an on-stage discussion between Gatiss, Das and Rigby) and first broadcast two days later.
