= The Devil in Amber =

2006 novel by Mark Gatiss

- Original hardback cover of The Devil in Amber
- Author: Mark Gatiss
- Language: English
- Series: Lucifer Box No. 2
- Genre: Historical, spy novel, horror
- Publisher: Simon & Schuster Ltd, Pocket Books (Imprint)
- Publication date: 2006
- Publication place: United Kingdom
- Media type: Print (hardcover, paperback)
- Pages: 248 pp (Paperback, 2006)
- ISBN: 978-0-7432-5709-1 (hardback, 2006); ISBN 978-0-7434-8380-3 (paperback, 2 July 2007)
- OCLC: 223292580
- Preceded by: The Vesuvius Club
- Followed by: Black Butterfly

The Devil in Amber is the second novel in a series featuring the fictional spy, Lucifer Box. It was published on 6 November 2006.

== Plot summary ==
Box is feeling his age as he goes about the business of a Royal Academy assassin in 1920s New York. He has been assigned to kill a fence and cocaine dealer named Hubbard by the Royal Academy (which is a front for the British Secret Service in the Box novels). The assassination does not go smoothly and Box only survives due to the timely intervention of Percy Flarge, a younger agent of the same type as Box. After Flarge leaves, Box discovers a cloth with curious ancient writing hidden on Hubbard's corpse.

His superior, Joshua Reynolds feels that it is time for Box to retire and allow Flarge to take his place but assigns Box to investigate the Fascist Anglo-United States Tribune (FAUST), and its sinister leader, Olympus Mons.

At a costume party Box meets Professor Reiss-Mueller and Sal Volatile, a defector who wishes to leave FAUST, hints that the organisation constitutes a grave threat to the world and arranges for Box to attend a meeting of FAUST, where Box discovers that his sister, Pandora Box, has become a fascist convert and is second in command of the organisation.

Later that night Reiss-Mueller meets with Box and identifies the writing on the cloth Box retrieved from Hubbard. The writing is part of an occult invocation intended to summon the devil. Back at his hotel, Box has a meeting with Christopher Miracle, who informs Box that Olympus Mons has been carrying out an archaeology dig at a castle on the border between Switzerland and France. The castle is known to Box, having been the location of an undisclosed espionage adventure during World War I, which led to the death of Box's lover and valet, Charlie Jackpot, and left Christopher Miracle a broken man.

At their next meeting Sal Volatile confides to Box that FAUST has an interest in the occult and is actively seeking the "Lamb of God", which Sal claims to have found. The meeting is interrupted when Sal Volatile is murdered and Box knocked senseless. On waking, Box discovers that he has been framed for murdering Sal during a lover's quarrel. Percy Flarge informs him that the Royal Academy has ordered that Box is to be given no assistance by their organisation and that Box is to be charged (and presumably executed) for the murder of Sal Volatile.

With the assistance of Rex, a gay bellhop who Box initiated during the early chapters, Box boards the Stiffkey, an old tramp freighter commanded by Captain Corpusty, who proves to be a fan of Box's paintings and commissions a portrait by Box on the journey to England.

While on board, Box discovers the ship is transporting cocaine disguised as communion wafers and seduces the cabin-girl Aggie, whose real name turns out to be Agnes Dei ("Lamb of God"). While in an intimate embrace with her Box has a vision of a ram's head with glowing eyes. Box then discovers that Captain Corpusty intends to betray him to the police and he escapes, taking Aggie with him.

Aggie is wounded, but Box remains free. He witnesses the spectre of the ram's head again and meets Mrs Croup who has an intense and unhealthy interest in famous murderers. Mrs Croup assists him in reaching St Beads nunnery, where Aggie was raised. There Box discovers that Olympus Mons and his amber shirted thugs have arrived first and witnesses them murder several nuns while seeking Aggie. Box is discovered and taken prisoner. Mons and Pandora Box reveal that Aggie is descended from Jesus Christ and Mary Magdalene and from a long line of descendants who have been raised to be perfect sacrifices. Mons conducts a séance to discover Aggie's whereabouts and gains a riddle in return. Box escapes with the aid of Mrs Croup who uses dynamite for fishing.

Box finds his way to Aggie only to find Percy Flarge has laid a trap for him. Box is again captured and is put on a train to be transported to London with Aggie. During the journey, Box accuses Flarge of betraying his country in favour of FAUST but Flarge appears to know nothing. The journey is interrupted by Box's domestic, Delilah, who Box passed a coded message to during his one phone call. Box is forced to kill Flarge's domestic "Twice" Daley in an escape attempt but ends up being chloroformed by Professor Reiss-Mueller.

The action transfers to the border of France and Switzerland. Professor Reiss-Mueller explains that the Metropolitan Museum serves as a similar front for the United States Secret Service as the Royal Academy does for the British Secret Service. He tells of an old legend about the Devil being entombed at this site and states that Olympus Mons intends to release the Devil to assist him in conquering the world.

Box quickly realises that he is Reiss-Mueller's prisoner. He slips away and visits the grave of his old friend, Charlie Jackpot where he meets Percy Flarge. Flarge confesses that he has been compromised by dabbling in the occult but denies betraying his country. Together they decide to raid the castle. On their way there they discover the dead body of Reiss-Mueller and the unconscious Delilah. On awaking Delilah relates how the Professor intended to perform the ritual himself and reap the reward, but was killed by a goat headed spectre.

The party of three enter caves below the castle and discover Mons, Pandora and the FAUST fraternity preparing to sacrifice Aggie. The Satanists are met by a number of cloaked and robed VIP's including Joshua Reynolds, the head of the Royal Academy and the boss of Box and Flarge.

When the ritual begins Box intervenes and succeeds in rescuing Aggie and banishing the Devil but only at the cost of the life of his sister, Pandora. Mons attempts to undo the damage Box has done but only succeeds in destroying himself and bringing down the roof of the cave system.

The heroes escape but so does Reynolds who attempts a getaway by cable car. Box intervenes and Reynolds is killed when the cable car crashes. The book closes on Box finally being reunited with Aggie and him promising her an adventurous future.

== Characters ==
Lucifer Box: A decadent Edwardian gentleman, resident and owner of No. 9 Downing Street. In addition to being a portrait painter, wit, dandy and indiscriminate rake, Lucifer Box is an agent of the British Secret Service, reporting to Sir Joshua Reynolds. He is middle-aged 'but still has to do a lot of derring-do', handsome, charming with a pronouncedly sardonic sense of humour.

Percy Flarge: Described as tall, lean, brown, with an infuriating grin, Percy Flarge is an assassin and agent of the British Secret Service working through the front of the Royal Academy. Although not as senior as Box, he has the opportunity for promotion when Box retires.

Pandora Box: Box's younger sister is prone to adopting fringe causes with a fanatical passion for brief periods of time. She is said to have lived by the sea and written a number of pamphlets. She is clearly in love with Olympus Mons, the leader of FAUST.

Joshua Reynolds: Leader of the Royal Academy, which is a front for the British Secret Service. According to Box, the name Joshua Reynolds is passed on like a title. The previous holder of the position was featured in The Vesuvius Club but died of heart trouble before the time at which The Devil in Amber is set. The current Reynolds is described as having "run to fat" with "the look of a minor bishop". His voice is described as oily and self-satisfied.

Sal Volatile: Described as having a heroic jaw and strong thighs with some pockmarks on his face, Sal is a defector from FAUST because he disapproves of their satanic plans.

Delilah (No last name): Indispensable domestic servant of His Majesty's Secret Service. She is physically strong and very discreet. Delilah has an unseen daughter, Ida, and overuses the letter "H" in her speech, indicating a Cockney accent.

Christopher Miracle: Fellow painter and friend of Lucifer Box. Miracle assisted Box in The Vesuvius Club. Since then he served in the British Army, specifically during action on the border of France and Switzerland which caused him to suffer a mental breakdown. Box states that he has never been the same since.

Charlie Jackpot : Valet, servant and lover of Lucifer Box. Entered the service of Lucifer during the events in The Vesuvius Club after Box's previous servant, Poplar, was shot in the back on a Serbian railway station. Died in military action before the beginning of The Devil in Amber during an undisclosed adventure that took place on the French/Swiss border during World War I.

== Release details ==
- 2006, United Kingdom, Simon & Schuster, ISBN 0-7432-5709-X, ISBN 978-0-7432-5709-1, Pub date 6 November 2006, hardback
- 2007, United Kingdom, Pocket Books, ISBN 0-7434-8380-4, ISBN 978-0-7434-8380-3, Pub date 2 July 2007, paperback

== Adaptations ==
=== Audio play ===
An audio play was produced by the BBC in 2010.

== Bibliography ==
- Mark Gatiss: The Devil in Amber: London: Simon and Schuster: 2006: ISBN 0-7432-5709-X
