= Sleep No More (anthology) =

1944 anthology of fantasy and horror stories edited by August Derleth

- Dust-jacket from the first edition
- Editor: August Derleth
- Illustrator: Lee Brown Coye
- Language: English
- Genre: Fantasy, horror
- Publisher: Rinehart & Company
- Publication date: 1944
- Publication place: United States
- Media type: Print (hardback)
- Pages: 374

Sleep No More is an anthology of fantasy and horror stories edited by August Derleth and illustrated by Lee Brown Coye, the first of three similar books in the 1940s. It was first published by Rinehart & Company in 1944. Featuring short stories by H. P. Lovecraft, Robert E. Howard, Clark Ashton Smith and other noted authors of the macabre genre, many of the stories made their initial appearance in Weird Tales magazine. The anthology is considered to be a classic of the genre, and is the initial foray by Coye into the field of horror illustration.

== Contents ==
- "Count Magnus", by M. R. James
- "Cassius", by Henry S. Whitehead
- "The Occupant of the Room", by Algernon Blackwood
- "The Return of the Sorcerer", by Clark Ashton Smith
- "Johnson Looked Back", by Thomas Burke
- "The Hand of the O'Mecca", by Howard Wandrei
- "He Cometh and He Passeth By", by H. Russell Wakefield
- "Thus I Refute Beelzy", by John Collier
- "The Mannikin", by Robert Bloch
- "Two Black Bottles", by W. B. Talman
- "The House of Sounds", by M. P. Shiel
- "The Cane", by Carl Jacobi
- "The Horror in the Burying Ground", by Hazel Heald
- "The Kennel", by Maurice Level
- "The Yellow Sign", by Robert W. Chambers
- "The Black Stone", by Robert E. Howard
- "Midnight Express", by Alfred Noyes
- "A Gentleman From Prague", by S. Grendon
- "The Black Druid", by Frank Belknap Long
- "The Rats in the Walls", by H. P. Lovecraft

== Sources ==
- Tuck, Donald H. (1974). The Encyclopedia of Science Fiction and Fantasy. Chicago: Advent. p. 140. ISBN 0-911682-20-1.
