= Jennifer Higham =

British actress

Jennifer Higham (born 26 August 1984 in England) is a British actress who has played numerous roles in theatre, television and film.

Higham attended Misbourne School in Great Missenden, Buckinghamshire. She has appeared in Doctors, Crooked House as Ruth (2 episodes), Cassandra's Dream as Helen, Ella Enchanted as Olive (Ella's stepsister), Persuasion as Louisa Musgrove, Born and Bred as Amy Marl, Gideon's Daughter as Girl playing Richard III, and I Shouldn't Be Alive as Jennifer.

She has also worked in theatre, including a stint with fellow English actress Liz Crowther and Shakespeare at Notre Dame's program Actors From The London Stage, where she played Juliet (among other roles) in the production of Romeo and Juliet.
