= Crisis Control =

British children's game show

Crisis Control is a BBC children's game show.

The show is presented by 'The Commander', played by Garry Robson. Each week there is a major world crisis, such as a tsunami, killer disease, or volcano. Children acting as cadets compete as teams (Green and Orange Cadets) in different tests to earn stars. The rescue is co-ordinated from a high-tech emergency response control centre. The last test is usually a physical activity. The winning cadets gain 'Crisis Control's ultimate accolade', the Golden Emblem. The runners up get the Silver Emblem.

The show was shown on Fridays at 4:30pm on the CBBC Channel in early 2009 but has not been broadcast since then.
