= The Vesuvius Club =

2004 novel by Mark Gatiss

- First edition
- Author: Mark Gatiss
- Language: English
- Series: Lucifer Box #1
- Genre: Historical, Spy novel
- Publisher: Simon & Schuster Ltd
- Publication date: 2004
- Publication place: United Kingdom
- Media type: Print (Hardback, Paperback), Audio (Audio CD, Cassette)
- Pages: 256 pp (Hardback, 2004)
- ISBN: 0-7432-5705-7 (Hardback, 2004); ISBN 0-7434-8379-0 (Paperback, 2005)
- OCLC: 59272896
- Dewey Decimal: 823/.92 22
- LC Class: PR6107.A86 V47 2004
- Preceded by: -
- Followed by: The Devil in Amber

The Vesuvius Club is a 2004 historical spy story by Mark Gatiss. It is the first novel in a series featuring the spy, Lucifer Box.

== Plot summary ==
Joshua Reynolds, of the British Secret Service, briefs Lucifer Box to pick up the threads of an investigation started by the recently murdered Jocelyn Utterson Poop of the Diplomatic Service. The only surviving clues were the names of two scientists who died within a day of each other.

The investigation leads to the "Superior Funerals" undertakers run by Tom Bowler. Mr Bowler seems more interested in shipping boxes to and from Naples than burying the dead. An attempt on Box's life soon follows.

A painter and friend of Box supplies a new lead into the deaths of the scientists, which leads to the curious Mrs. Midsomer Knight, who has been replaced by a soon to be murdered maidservant. Lucifer's friend, Christopher Miracle, is implicated in the murder.

In Naples Lucifer interviews one of the survivors of the "Cambridge four" group of scientists and fears for his life. Soon after he meets Charlie Jackpot, who invites him to a house of ill-repute. At that point, we learn that Lucifer is bisexual, as Charlie is gay, and the two have sex. Charlie then leads Lucifer into the Vesuvius Club, where Lucifer meets the alluring Venus, who is not who she seems, and he and Charlie fall victim to sleeping gas.

Lucifer awakens in a cell and learns from a fellow prisoner that relics are being sold from excavation sites to finance a larger operation and that the "Superior Funerals" undertakers are part of a smuggling racket.

Lucifer escapes and discovers Charlie in a death trap, from which Box rescues him before being discovered. Lucifer and Charlie escape via the sewer system.

The following morning, Lucifer discovers that the professor he interviewed has disappeared. Examining the scene, Lucifer discovers a detailed schematic of Mount Vesuvius.

Box's investigation then leads him to an opium den, then to a supposedly haunted house where he discovers the three supposed dead professors and Mrs. Knight in a drugged stupor. The house leads to a passageway into the ancient ruin of Pompeii and the villain's base. Box confronts Venus and Unman, a traitor who has been assisting the enemy. Box attempts to do a deal for testimony against Victor. Unfortunately Venus turns out to in fact be Victor.

Victor seeks revenge against those who wronged his father. Victor has completed the work of his father, as scientist who was driven mad and died some time ago. His intent is to trigger a massive volcanic eruption, which will spark a chain reaction that will ultimately destroy Italy.

Lucifer's companions are imprisoned in the volcano. The intent is for them to be incinerated in the eruption. Lucifer himself is taken to a volcanic vent and to be steamed to death but escapes and manages to rescue his companions after capturing Bowler.

Venus/Victor has no intention of anybody leaving the volcano before the eruption. When Box reveals this to Bowler, Bowler turns against Venus/Victor and attempts to prevent the device being detonated. This fails and the device is released. The device is only stopped when Bowler uses the steam vent to prevent the bomb being delivered to the right part of the volcano, but the detonation triggers a minor eruption and everyone must flee for their lives.

Unman tries to prevent the heroes escaping, killing Bowler and wounding Lucifer, before he himself is killed. Lucifer and the others escape and the remaining unclear points of the mystery are cleared up while Lucifer convalesces under the care of Charlie.

Lucifer's heterosexual love interest, Bella, appears and reveals she is the daughter of a man he killed in the early chapters of the book as part of a routine assignment. Charlie intercedes at the last moment to save Lucifer and Bella is killed.

== Characters ==
Lucifer Box: A decadent Edwardian gentleman, resident and owner of No. 9 Downing Street. In addition to being a portrait painter, wit, dandy and indiscriminate rake, Lucifer Box is an agent of His Majesty's Secret Service, reporting to Sir Joshua Reynolds. He is described as young, handsome, charming with a pronouncedly sardonic sense of humour.

Delilah (No last name): Indispensable domestic servant of His Majesty's Secret Service. She is physically strong and very discreet. Delilah has an unseen daughter, Ida, and overuses the letter "H" in her speech, indicating a Cockney accent.

Christopher Miracle: Fellow painter and friend of Lucifer Box who assists his investigation and later becomes a murder suspect.

Charlie Jackpot : Handsome gay youth who provides useful information, access to the Vesuvius Club and valet services and sexual distraction for Lucifer Box. Entered the service of Lucifer after his previous servant, Poplar, was shot in the back on a Serbian railway station.

== Adaptations ==
=== Audio play ===
An audio play was produced by the BBC in 2004.

=== Graphic novel ===
It was adapted into a graphic novel in 2005, with art by Ian Bass. It is officially named The Vesuvius Club: Graphic Edition.

=== Television ===
In 2007 it was reported that the BBC would be adapting the book for television.

== Release details ==
- 2004, United Kingdom, Simon & Schuster, ISBN 0-7394-6346-2, Pub date November 1, 2004, Hardback
- 2004, United Kingdom, BBC Audio Books, ISBN 0-563-52751-X, Pub date November 1, 2004 Audio play
- 2005, United Kingdom, Pocket Books, ISBN 0-7434-8379-0, Pub date July 21, 2005, Paperback
- 2005, United Kingdom, Simon & Schuster, ISBN 0-7432-7600-0, Pub date November 7, 2005, Graphic novel
