= Dave Fishwick =

English businessman (born 1971)

Dave Fishwick OBE
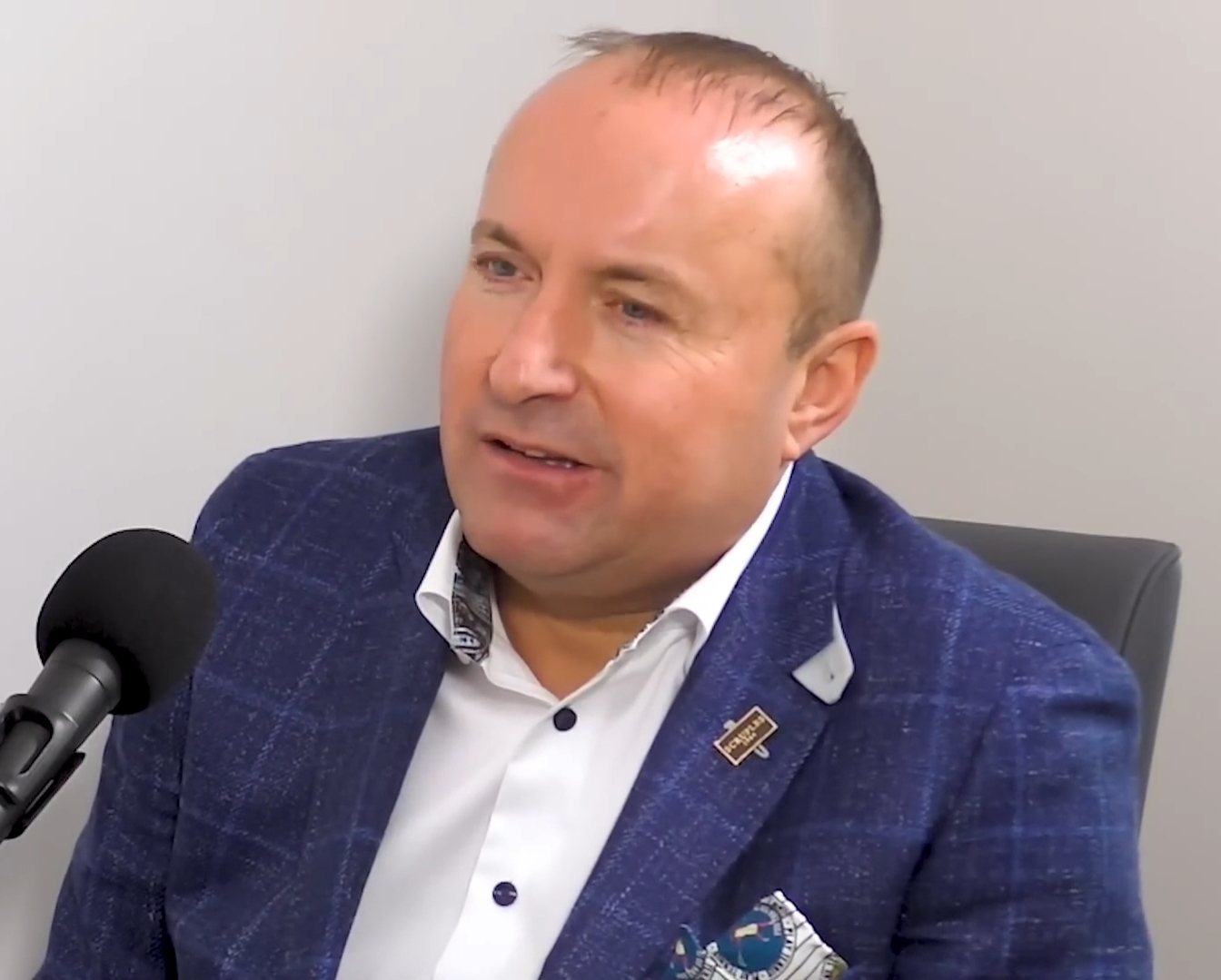
- Fishwick on James English's Anything Goes podcast in 2023
- Born: March 1971 (age 55); Nelson, Lancashire, England
- Occupations: Businessperson; Media personality

David Fishwick OBE (born March 1971) is an English businessman. Born in Nelson, Lancashire, he left school at sixteen with no qualifications, before opening David Fishwick Minibus Sales and becoming the biggest minibus supplier in Britain. After finding that big banks were no longer willing to lend his customers money due to the 2008 financial crisis, he opened Burnley Savings and Loans, which used the advertising slogan "Bank on Dave". His efforts were documented in the 2012–2013 Channel 4 series Bank of Dave.

After finding that customers were coming to him after accumulating debt using payday loan firms, he investigated the industry for the 2014 Channel 4 series Dave: Loan Ranger. Both of these series won British Academy Scotland Awards. His efforts at setting up a bank and investigating payday loan firms were loosely adapted for the 2023 film Bank of Dave and its 2025 sequel Bank of Dave 2: The Loan Ranger.

== Life and career ==
=== Early life and automotives ===
Fishwick was born in March 1971. He grew up in a poor family on John Street in Nelson, Lancashire, and attended Edge End High School, both of which were later demolished. (Note: For John Street, see.; For Edge End, see.) He left school aged sixteen with no qualifications, and took a Youth Training Scheme course at a construction site for £27.50 per week (equivalent to £77 in 2025) plus overtime, where he pebbledashed buildings. While there, he was motivated by an incident in which he discovered after ordering a chip butty that he was threepence short, prompting the cashier to bin a handful of already salted and vinegared chips.

"I went around all the garages and I found one that had some old part exchanges and I said, "Could I take that old part exchange away? I'll clean it up. I'll scrub it off. I'll sell it. I'll advertise it and I'll bring you back an agreed amount of money, and the difference is mine." I eventually found a garage that agreed, and I agreed to give them £70 for this [Vauxhall] Cavalier when I sold it. I took it away, scrubbed it up, sold it for £97 so I made £27 profit. I repeated that process to the point where I could negotiate a better deal and could pay upfront, and that's how it started."

— Fishwick speaking to The Daily Telegraph in February 2023

After choosing to enter the UK automotive industry, he asked several garages if he could have a part-exchanged car to restore and sell in exchange for some of the profits. His first part-exchange was a heavily scratched Vauxhall Cavalier with flat tyres, which he bought for £70, advertised in the local paper for £100 and sold for £97. He repeated this process until he could afford to buy upfront, and would stuff his wallet with paper to make himself appear richer to prospective sellers. Around this time, he spent his mornings selling cheap clothes for a profit and his evenings performing as a disc jockey. He met his future wife while working at a nightclub after she told him the music he was playing was rubbish, prompting him to invite her to pick a record so long as she wrote her phone number on its sleeve.

Fishwick then diversified into refurbishing vans after being given a red Astramax van to refurbish, and then into minibuses for the same reason. He switched exclusively to vans, minibuses, and minicoaches in 1994, and opened David Fishwick Minibus Sales, which had sites in Colne, Birmingham, and Stockport. He later became the biggest minibus supplier in Britain.

Between 2004 and 2017, the firm sponsored Burnley F.C., during which time the club's Turf Moor stadium's Cricket Field Stand was named the David Fishwick Stand. In 2005, having bought a helicopter for his own use and finding that others were asking if they could borrow it, Fishwick opened a helicopter business, David Fishwick Helicopters Ltd, which provided charter flights.

=== Bank of Dave and Loan Ranger ===
During the 2008 financial crisis, Fishwick found that big banks had stopped lending his customers money, posing an existential threat to his business. After lending his own money on his own terms, and after no borrowers defaulted on their payments during the first six months, he looked into setting up a bank himself, where he discovered that although obtaining a consumer credit licence was simple enough, obtaining a deposit-taking licence required a minimum of £10,000,000 to be kept in reserve under Financial Conduct Authority regulations. He later opened Burnley Savings and Loans in September 2011 in Keirby Walk in the town centre using a peer-to-peer crowdfunding model, with "Bank on Dave" emblazoned on the front of the shop as an advertising slogan.

Fishwick's efforts were documented in the Channel 4 series Bank of Dave, which aired two episodes in July 2012. The series was released at the same time as Bank of Dave: How I Took on the Banks, a book. Reviewing the second episode, Alex Hardy of The Times described the show as "some of the most joyous TV seen this year" and opined that Fishwick "could have been one of the best comedy characters of 2012". A subsequent episode, Bank of Dave: Fighting the Fat Cats, was broadcast in February 2013, and won an award for the Best Feature/Factual Entertainment Programme at the 2013 British Academy Scotland Awards.

In mid-2020, Fishwick was approached by screenwriter Piers Ashworth, who was interested in making a film about his bank's story. He granted permission for this on the condition that it was shot in Burnley, where many of the events took place. Produced by Piers Tempest of Tempo Productions and Matt Williams and Karl Hall of Future Artists Entertainment, the film was released in January 2023 by Netflix as the semi-autobiographical film Bank of Dave and became the ninth most searched film that year. In June 2024, Jason Manford stated that he was in talks to star in a musical version of Bank of Dave, with Fishwick later stating that the musical had been suggested by Williams.

In 2014, after young people came to him after accumulating debt engaging with payday loan firms, he fronted Dave: Loan Ranger, in which he investigated the industry. Originally intended for autumn 2013, the show was delayed until January 2014 for legal reasons. Upon broadcast, the show won Best Current Affairs Programme at the 2014 British Academy Scotland Awards. A sequel to Bank of Dave, Bank of Dave 2: The Loan Ranger, was announced that April, was released on 10 January 2025, and was loosely based on his experiences with the industry.

=== Other media appearances ===
In 2013, Fishwick appeared on The Secret Millions, in which he and a group of teenagers who had suffered challenging upbringings such as homelessness or addiction attempted to open a employment agency. That May, alongside Loan Ranger, Channel 4 announced Fishwick Out of Water, a six-part series intended for 2014 in which Fishwick would be dropped blindfolded into a random UK town with a pound and challenged to make a fortune; this did not make it to broadcast. In 2015, he presented Can Property Pay Your Wages, in which he advised members of the public on how to make money through property, and then the consumer series Shoppers Guide to Saving Money, which he co-presented with Kate Quilton. In 2017, he appeared in Dave's Guide to Spending, a documentary in which he explored supply-chain costs and launched a brand of bottled water. All three of these aired on Channel 4, with Fishwick working with Warner Bros. on the last of these. (Note: For Can Property Pay Your Wages, see.; For Shoppers Guide to Saving Money, see.; For Dave's Guide to Spending, see.)

In July 2017, it was announced that Fishwick would film a six-part series for Channel 4 called How to Get Rich Quick. Upon broadcast in July 2018, Peter Crawley of The Irish Times wrote that the show "encourages people of modest means to pursue equally modest dreams in the very modest hopes, several weeks of hard work later, of doubling their modest investments." In 2020, Fishwick appeared on a week of episodes of Your Money And Your Life, a BBC One daytime consumer show presented by Matt Allwright and Kym Marsh. He declined invitations to appear on the 2023 series of I'm a Celebrity...Get Me Out of Here! and the 2024 series of Strictly Come Dancing, both times due to work commitments.
