= Crooked House (TV series) =

2008 British television ghost story series

- Mark Gatiss and Lee Ingleby in Crooked House
- Genre: Horror mystery
- Written by: Mark Gatiss
- Directed by: Damon Thomas
- Starring: Lee Ingleby; Mark Gatiss; Philip Jackson; Ian Hallard; Jennifer Higham
- Theme music composer: David Arnold; Michael Price
- Country of origin: United Kingdom
- Original language: English
- No. of episodes: 3

Production
- Producer: Paul Frift
- Production locations: Windsor, Berkshire, England, UK
- Running time: 90 min (3x30 min)
- Production company: Tiger Aspect Productions

Original release
- Network: BBC Four
- Release: 22 December – 24 December 2008

Crooked House is a British three-part supernatural drama television series that aired on BBC Four in December 2008.

The three-part series was broadcast on consecutive nights from 22 to 24 December 2008. It was written and co-produced by actor and writer Mark Gatiss, who found fame in the BBC series The League of Gentlemen. The three linked episodes form an anthology story, influenced by the writings of M. R. James and Amicus horror movies, and a Māori death-mask belonging to Gatiss. They concern the ghostly secrets of the fictional Geap Manor, a recently demolished Tudor mansion.

== Synopsis ==
Ben Morris, a young teacher, finds an antique door-knocker in his garden and takes it to the local museum, where the curator tells him it belonged to Geap Manor and tells him tales about the manor and its former inhabitants.

The first story, "The Wainscoting", is set in the late 18th century. Gatiss plays a museum curator who is given a strange door-knocker, which inspires him to share his dark research into the Manor. The first tale relates the story of Joseph Bloxham, who buys and improves the Manor after capitalising on an investment that ruined his fellow speculators. Strange noises are heard behind the newly installed wainscoting, the wood of which came from the gallows known as 'Tyburn Tree'.

The second story, "Something Old", takes place in the 1920s, where, at the Manor, a lavish costume ball is being held. During the ball, young Felix de Momery announces his engagement to Ruth, much to the surprise and annoyance of his grandmother and his friends, Billy and Katherine. The young couple's future seems inextricably linked with another tragic wedding day and a ghostly bride who haunts the corridors.

In the third episode, "The Knocker", Ben himself discovers that, even though demolished, Geap Manor continues to cast a long shadow. Recently split from his girlfriend, he finds the cosy blandness of his modern house suddenly altered by events from the distant past, and by the sinister figure of Sir Roger Widdowson.

The cast included Mark Gatiss, Julian Rhind-Tutt, Ian Hallard, Philip Jackson, Lee Ingleby, Jean Marsh, Samuel Barnett, Daniela Denby-Ashe, Anna Madeley, Andy Nyman, Jennifer Higham, and illusionist Derren Brown. The series was directed by Damon Thomas.
