= Mark Gatiss =

British actor and writer (born 1966)

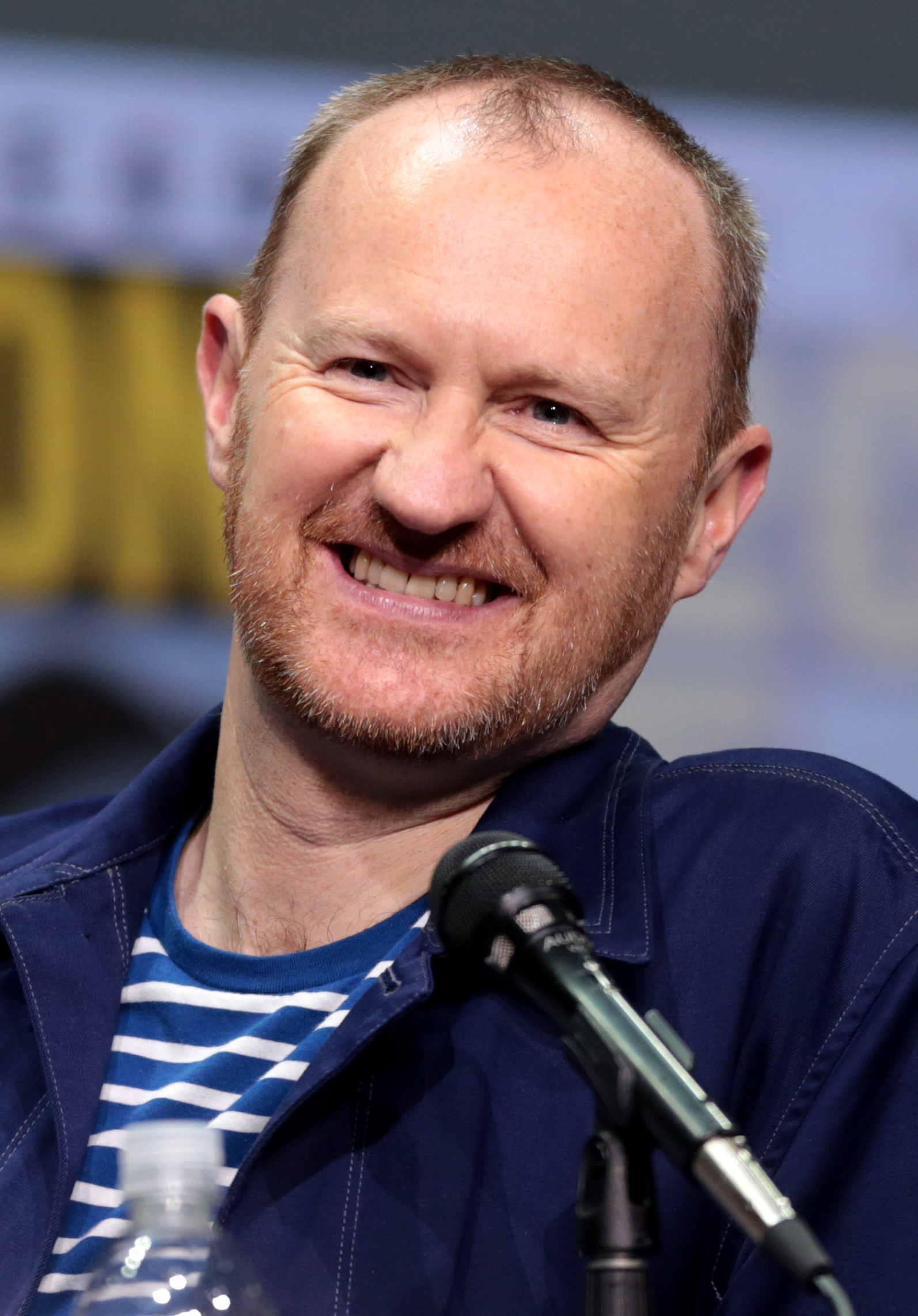
- Gatiss in 2017
- Born: 17 October 1966 (age 60); Sedgefield, County Durham, England
- Education: Bretton Hall College of Education
- Occupations: Actor; screenwriter; producer; comedian; novelist; director
- Years active: 1993–present
- Spouse: Ian Hallard (m. 2008)
- Mark Gatiss's voice from the BBC programme Desert Island Discs, 23 October 2011.

Mark Gatiss (/ˈɡeɪtɪs/; born 17 October 1966) is an English actor, comedian, screenwriter, director, producer and novelist. Best known for his acting work on stage and screen as well as for co-creating television shows with Steven Moffat, he has received awards including two Laurence Olivier Awards, a BAFTA TV Award, a Primetime Emmy Award, and a Peabody Award.

Gatiss co-created, co-wrote and acted in BBC comedy series The League of Gentlemen (1999–2002). He portrayed Mycroft Holmes in the BBC series Sherlock (2010–2017) and Frank Renfield in BBC / Netflix miniseries Dracula (2020), both of which he co-created with Moffat, and wrote several episodes of Doctor Who. His other TV roles include Tycho Nestoris in Game of Thrones (2014–2017), Stephen Gardiner in Wolf Hall (2015), and Peter Mandelson in Coalition (2015). He has acted in films such as Victor Frankenstein (2015), Denial (2016), Christopher Robin (2018), The Favourite (2018), The Father (2020), Operation Mincemeat (2021), and Mission: Impossible – Dead Reckoning Part One (2023).

On stage, Gatiss played Menenius in William Shakespeare's Coriolanus (2013) for which he was nominated for the Laurence Olivier Award for Best Actor in a Supporting Role. He won his first Olivier Award as Shpigelsky in Patrick Marber's adaptation of A Month in the Country as Three Days in the Country in 2016, and a second for his portrayal of Sir John Gielgud in the Jack Thorne play The Motive and the Cue in 2023, for which he earned the Laurence Olivier Award for Best Actor.

In 2018, he playedKing George III in a revival of the Alan Bennett play The Madness of George III. His other theatre roles include Captain Brazen in The Recruiting Officer (2012), Steven Crosswell in The Vote (2015), and Jacob Marley in his own adaptation of A Christmas Carol: A Ghost Story (2021).

== Early life and education ==
Gatiss was born in Sedgefield, County Durham, to Winifred Rose (née O'Kane, 1931–2003) and Maurice Gatiss (1931–2021). He grew up opposite the Victorian Winterton Psychiatric Hospital, and later in Trimdon, before his father, a colliery engineer, took a job as engineer at the School Aycliffe Mental Hospital in Heighington. Gatiss is of Irish descent via his mother, and he has described his family background as working class, and his passions included watching Doctor Who and Hammer Horror films on television, reading Sherlock Holmes and H. G. Wells, and collecting fossils. All those interests have influenced his creative work.

Gatiss attended Heighington Church of England Primary School, and Woodham Comprehensive School in Newton Aycliffe. At the latter, he was two years ahead of Paul Magrs, who also went on to write Doctor Who fiction. Gatiss then studied Theatre Arts at Bretton Hall College, an arts college affiliated to the University of Leeds.

== Career ==
=== 1999–2005: Career beginnings ===
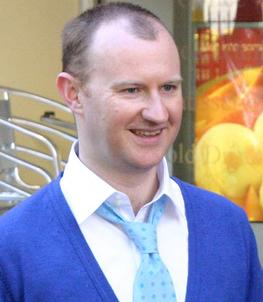
Gatiss in 2006

Gatiss is a member of the sketch comedy team The League of Gentlemen, along with fellow performers Reece Shearsmith, Steve Pemberton and co-writer Jeremy Dyson. He first met his co-writers and performers at Bretton Hall, Yorkshire, a drama school which he attended after finishing school and having spent a gap year travelling around Europe. The League of Gentlemen began as a stage act in 1995, which won the Perrier Award at Edinburgh Festival Fringe in 1997.

In 1995 the show transferred to BBC Radio 4 as On the Town with the League of Gentlemen. In 1999, The League of Gentlemen arrived on television on BBC Two. The television programme has earned Gatiss and his colleagues a British Academy Television Award, a Royal Television Society Award and the prestigious Golden Rose of Montreux. In 2005, the film The League of Gentlemen's Apocalypse was released, to generally positive reviews.

In 2009, Shearsmith and Pemberton reunited to create a similarly dark BBC sitcom, Psychoville, which featured an episode guest-starring Gatiss. In 2012, the three reunited again to film a series of sketches for the fourth series of CBBC show Horrible Histories.

Outside The League, Gatiss's television work has included writing for the 2001 revival of Randall & Hopkirk and script editing the popular sketch show Little Britain in 2003, making guest appearances in both. In 2001 he guested in Spaced as a villainous government employee modelled on the character of Agent Smith from The Matrix film series. In 2001 he appeared in several editions of the documentary series SF:UK. Other acting appearances include the comedy-drama In the Red (BBC Two, 1998), the macabre sitcom Nighty Night (BBC Three, 2003), Agatha Christie's Marple as Ronald Hawes in "The Murder at the Vicarage", a guest appearance in the Vic & Bob series Catterick in 2004 and the live 2005 remake of the classic science fiction serial The Quatermass Experiment.

In the autumn of 2005, a second series of Nighty Night and the new comedy-drama Funland, the latter co-written by his League cohort Jeremy Dyson, both featured Gatiss and aired on BBC Three. In October 2006, he appeared as Johnnie Cradock, alongside Nighty Night star Julia Davis as Fanny Cradock, in Fear of Fanny on BBC Four. In January 2007, he featured as Ratty in a new production of The Wind in the Willows shown on BBC One. He wrote and starred in the BBC Four docudrama The Worst Journey in the World, based on the memoir by polar explorer Apsley Cherry-Garrard.

Gatiss appears frequently in BBC Radio productions, including the science fiction comedy Nebulous and The Further Adventures of Sherlock Holmes story The Shameful Betrayal of Miss Emily Smith. In 2009, he was The Man in Black when BBC Radio 7 revived the character (originally played by Valentine Dyall and Edward de Souza) to introduce a series of five creepy audio dramas. He is also involved with theatre, having penned the play The Teen People in the early 1990s, and appeared in a successful run of the play 'Art' in 2003 at the Whitehall Theatre in London.

In film, he has starred in Sex Lives of the Potato Men (2004) and had minor roles in Birthday Girl (2001), Bright Young Things (2003), Match Point (2005) and played Bamber Gascoigne in Starter for 10 (2006). The League of Gentlemen's Apocalypse, a film based on the television series, co-written by and starring Gatiss, was released in June 2005. He also plays the recurring character of Gold in the audio revival of Sapphire and Steel produced by Big Finish Productions. Gatiss also appeared in Edgar Wright's fake trailer for Grindhouse, Don't, a homage to 1970s' Hammer Horrors.

=== 2007–2017: Doctor Who and Sherlock ===
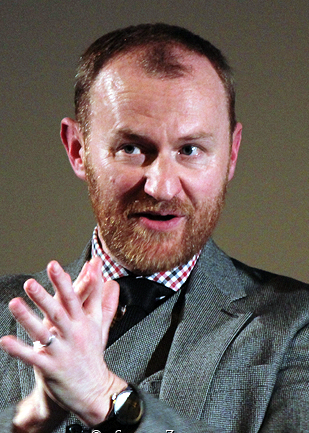
Mark Gatiss at "A Scandal in Belgravia" episode screening

Gatiss has also made three credited appearances in Doctor Who. In 2007, he played Professor Lazarus in "The Lazarus Experiment". In 2011, he returned in the Series 6 episode "The Wedding of River Song" as a character known as Gantok, and in the 2017 Christmas special "Twice Upon A Time" as "The Captain". Also in 2007, he appeared as Robert Louis Stevenson in Jekyll, a BBC One serial by his fellow Doctor Who scriptwriter Steven Moffat. In 2008, he appeared in Clone as Colonel Black. Gatiss also wrote, co-produced and acted in the BBC Four ghost story Crooked House (2008).

He appeared in the stage adaptation of Pedro Almodóvar's All About My Mother at the Old Vic in London from 25 August-24 November 2007. He won much critical acclaim for his portrayal of the transgender character Agrado. In the 2008 English language re-release of the cult 2006 Norwegian animated film Free Jimmy, Gatiss voiced the character of "Jakki," a heavy-set, bizarrely dressed biker member of the "Lappish Mafia." In this his voice is used along with the other actors of League of Gentlemen such as Steve Pemberton and Reece Shearsmith. The dialogue was written by Simon Pegg and other actors included Pegg himself, Woody Harrelson and David Tennant, who worked with Gatiss on Doctor Who. He was scheduled to perform in Darker Shores by Michael Punter, a ghost story for all the family, at Hampstead Theatre 3 December 2009 – 16 January 2010 but had to withdraw after a serious family illness. Tom Goodman-Hill took over his role.

In 2010, he portrayed Malcolm McLaren in the BBC drama Worried About the Boy which focused on the life and career of Boy George. He adapted H. G. Wells' The First Men in the Moon into a television film of the same name for the BBC, also playing Professor Cavor. He also made a three-part BBC documentary series entitled A History of Horror, a personal exploration of the history of horror cinema. This was followed on 30 October 2012 with a look at European horror with the documentary Horror Europa.

In March 2010, he was a guest on Private Passions, the biographical music discussion programme on BBC Radio 3. From December 2010 to March 2011, Gatiss was playing the role of Bernard in Alan Ayckbourn's Season's Greetings at the Royal National Theatre in London alongside Catherine Tate. In December 2011, he appeared in an episode of The Infinite Monkey Cage in an episode entitled The Science of Christmas, alongside Brian Cox, Robin Ince and Richard Dawkins. In January 2012, he took the role of Brazen in The Recruiting Officer at the Donmar Theatre, London. From 18 October – 24 November that year he was Charles I in the Hampstead Theatre production of 55 Days by Howard Brenton, a play dramatising the military coup that killed a King and forged a Commonwealth under Oliver Cromwell.

With Steven Moffat, with whom Gatiss worked on Doctor Who and Jekyll, he also co-created and co-produced Sherlock (2010) starring Benedict Cumberbatch and Martin Freeman. He also portrayed Mycroft Holmes in the series. Gatiss had influence on all episodes as producer and he wrote four episodes, one for each series: the finale, "The Great Game" for the first series, "The Hounds of Baskerville" for the second, "The Empty Hearse" for the third and "The Six Thatchers" for the fourth. He also co-wrote "Many Happy Returns", a mini-episode released in late December 2013 which acts as a prelude to the third series, with Steven Moffat; the episode "The Sign of Three" with Moffat and Steve Thompson; and "The Abominable Bride", a special episode released in early January 2016, with Moffat. Finally, he co-wrote the final episode of Sherlock, "The Final Problem", with Moffat, released in January 2017.

In December 2013, Gatiss joined the cast of the Donmar Warehouse production of Coriolanus as Senator of Rome, Menenius. The play went from 6 December 2013 through 13 February 2014. For his performance, Gatiss received a nomination for the Laurence Olivier Award for Best Actor in a Supporting Role. On 25 December 2013, a version of the ghost story "The Tractate Middoth" by M. R. James and adapted by Gatiss was broadcast on BBC Two as part of the long-running A Ghost Story for Christmas series. It starred Sacha Dhawan, John Castle, Louise Jameson, Una Stubbs, David Ryall, Eleanor Bron, Nick Burns and Roy Barraclough. It was followed on 25 December 2013 by a screening on BBC2 of a new documentary by Gatiss titled M. R. James: Ghost Writer. The programme saw Gatiss explore the work of James and look at how his work still inspires contemporary horror today.

He appeared in season four of Game of Thrones in 2014 playing Tycho Nestoris and reprised this role in season five and season seven. In the BBC's 2015 series Wolf Hall, Gatiss played King Henry VIII's secretary Stephen Gardiner. He also appeared in Channel 4's Coalition in 2015. In 2016, he played Harold in the groundbreaking American play The Boys in the Band at Park Theatre (London) opposite his husband Ian Hallard. They made history when the play transferred to the Vaudeville Theatre in 2017 as the first married gay couple to appear together on a West End stage.

Gatiss appeared as the Prince Regent (later George IV) in the eight-part historical fiction television drama series Taboo (2017) first broadcast on BBC One in the United Kingdom on 7 January 2017 and in the United States on FX on 10 January 2017. In May 2017, Gatiss began a recurring role on The Secret History of Hollywood, a series of podcast biopics on Golden Age-era Hollywood. Its 11-part series, Shadows tells the story of Val Lewton's life and career, with Gatiss providing the introductions for each episode.

=== 2018–present: Theatre roles and expansion ===
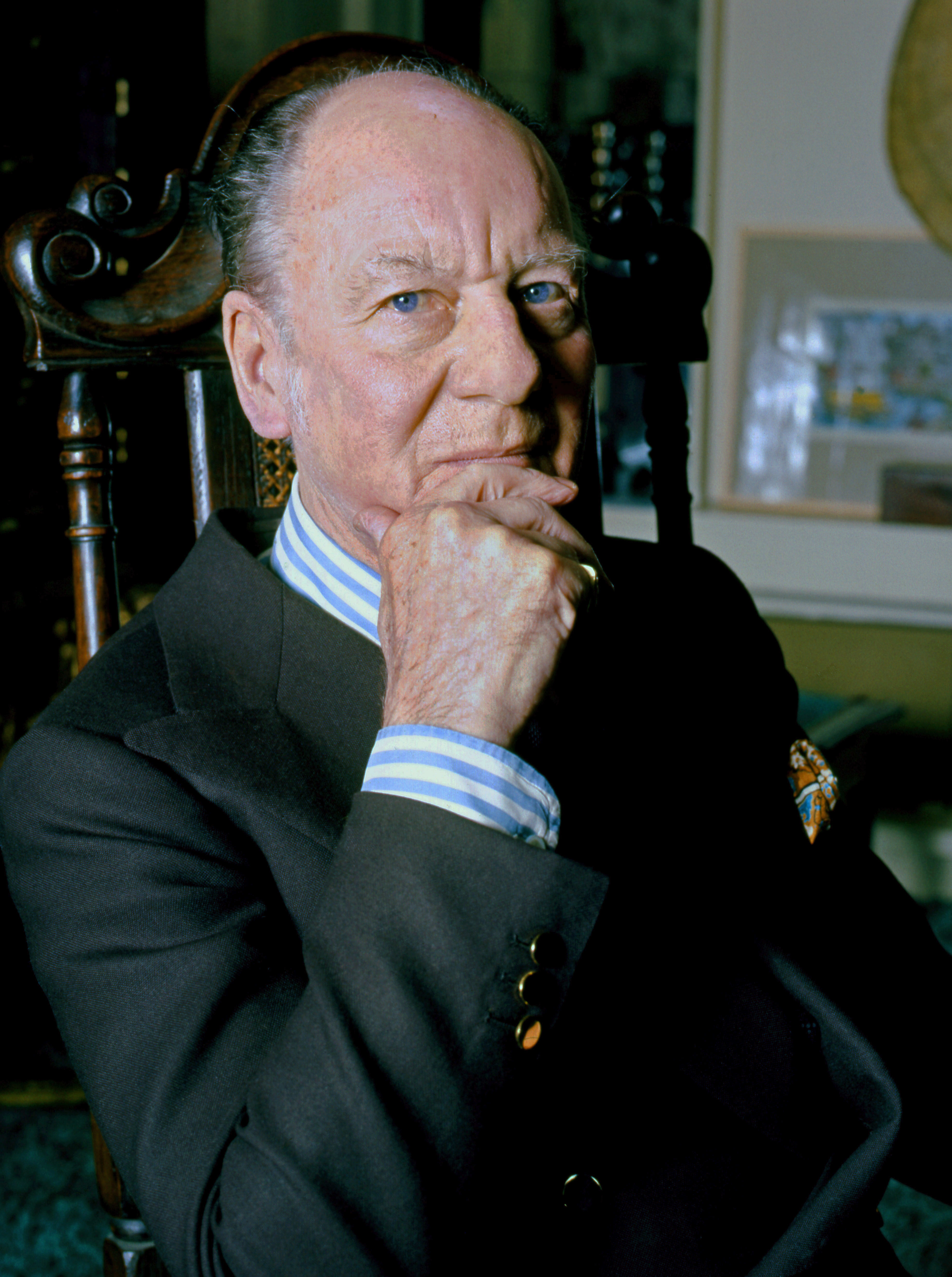
Gatiss portrayed Sir John Gielgud in the play The Motive and the Cue (2023) earning a Laurence Olivier Award for Best Actor.

In November 2018, Gatiss portrayed the lead, King George III in a revival of the Alan Bennet play The Madness of George III at Nottingham Playhouse. The production was broadcast live to cinemas as part of National Theatre Live. Kate Maltby of The Guardian wrote of his performance, "Productions of The Madness of George III live or die by their star, and Gatiss delivers a tour de force. This is a viscerally repulsive depiction of the gap between public and private life." That same year he played a supporting role as John Churchill, 1st Duke of Marlborough in the Yorgos Lanthimos directed black comedy The Favourite (2018) starring Olivia Colman, Emma Stone, and Rachel Weisz. Also in 2018 he acted in the children's film Christopher Robin starring Ewan McGregor and The Mercy with Colin Firth.

In 2020, he acted opposite Anthony Hopkins in the film The Father based on the Florian Zeller play Le Père. In October 2021, Gatiss wrote and played Jacob Marley in a new adaptation of A Christmas Carol – A Ghost Story by Charles Dickens playing at both Nottingham Playhouse and Alexandra Palace in 2021.

In 2017, Gatiss and Steven Moffat re-teamed to write three episodes for TV miniseries Dracula. The series premiered on BBC One on 1 January 2020, and was broadcast over three consecutive days. The three episodes were then released on Netflix on 4 January 2020. He appeared as a modern-day incarnation/descendant of Count Dracula's servile companion Renfield in the third and final episode, "The Dark Compass".

In December 2021, a new adaptation of The Ghosts by Antonia Barber was broadcast, written and directed by Gatiss for Sky One. In 2021 he acted in the British war film Operation Mincemeat portraying Ivor Montagu. That same year he acted in Locked Down, The Road Dance, and The Sparks Brothers. He joined the Mission Impossible franchise acting in action film Mission: Impossible – Dead Reckoning Part One (2023) starring Tom Cruise.

In May 2022, Gatiss directed The Unfriend, a new play by Steven Moffat at the Minerva Theatre, Chichester, starring Amanda Abbington, Frances Barber and Reece Shearsmith. The play transferred to London's West End Criterion Theatre in January 2023. In February 2023, Gatiss directed The Way Old Friends Do a new play by Ian Hallard at the Birmingham Rep. This also transferred to the Criterion in August. In April 2022, Gatiss starred as Lawrence in the seventh series opener of Inside No. 9.

In April 2023, Gatiss played as Sir John Gielgud in The Motive and the Cue, a new play written by Jack Thorne and directed by Sam Mendes at London's National Theatre. The story of how Richard Burton (played by Johnny Flynn) and Gielgud clashed as they staged Hamlet on Broadway in 1964, the play has received good reviews, particularly the two leads. Leonie Cooper of Time Out wrote of his performance, "Mark Gatiss launches himself into a condescending but sensitive Gielgud...[who] is just as impressive, his uncanny Gielgud manifesting a man in flux, as a new era of performance threatens to subsume his traditional take on stagecraft. Gatiss's Gielgud is lonely and lost, but still more than capable of getting one over on the wayward Burton." For his performance Gatiss won the Laurence Olivier Award for Best Actor.

Gatiss co-wrote and starred in Bookish. In 2025, he appeared as Angstrom in Mission: Impossible – The Final Reckoning.

In September 2025, Gatiss appeared alongside Reece Shearsmith, Steve Pemberton and Monica Dolan, in BBC Radio 4 premier of Jeremy Dyson's original comedy drama High Cockalorum. Set in West Yorkshire in 1978 and inspired by a true story, the drama celebrated Bradford City of Culture and was part of the BBC's "Contains Strong Language Festival".

In April 2026, Gatiss made his Royal Shakespeare Company debut in the title role of The Resistible Rise of Arturo Ui by Bertolt Brecht, updated by Stephen Sharkey and directed by Seán Linnen at the Swan Theatre, Stratford-upon-Avon with a cast also including Mawaan Rizwan, Kadiff Kirwan and Janie Dee.

== Writing for Doctor Who ==
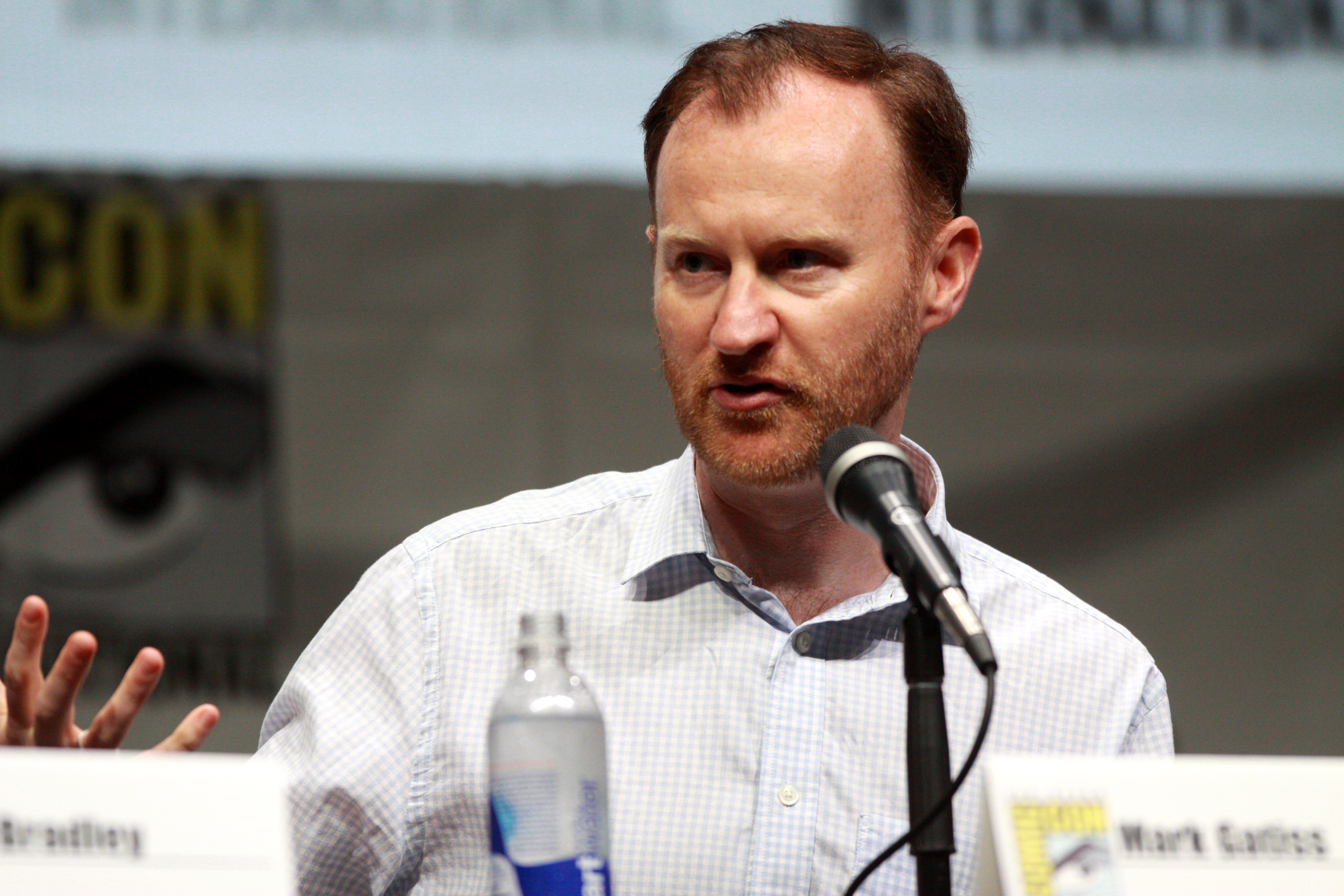
Gatiss at the 2013 San Diego Comic-Con, promoting Doctor Who

At the age of eleven, Gatiss won a school literary competition with a short science fiction story "The Anti-Noise Machine", published in a booklet by Darlington Borough Council. Gatiss had a childhood interest in the BBC science-fiction show Doctor Who and devoted much of his early writing to the series, despite its 1989 cancellation. Gatiss's earliest published work as a professional writer was a sequence of novels in Virgin Publishing's New Adventures series of continuation stories and novels. In these works, he tried to correct the problems which had led to the show's decline in the late 1980s.

The first television scripts Gatiss wrote were for a BBV direct-to-video series called "P.R.O.B.E." Gatiss's four scripts each featured a different actor who had played Doctor Who's title character of the Doctor: Jon Pertwee, Peter Davison, Colin Baker and Sylvester McCoy. The videos have since been released on DVD despite Gatiss once commenting that he would not authorise their re-release, as he regarded them as a learning exercise. His other early contributions to the Doctor Who franchise included four novels, two audio plays for BBV and two audio plays for Big Finish Productions. in addition to writing for Big Finish he has acted in numerous releases in their Doctor Who, Bernice Summerfield and Classics ranges.

Gatiss has written nine episodes for the 2005 revival of the show. His first, "The Unquiet Dead", was the third episode of the revived series in 2005; the second, "The Idiot's Lantern", aired in 2006 in the second series. Although he acted in the third series and proposed an ultimately unproduced episode for the fourth, involving Nazis and the British Museum, he did not return as a writer until 2010. He wrote "Victory of the Daleks" for that year's fifth series, "Night Terrors" for series 6, "Cold War" and "The Crimson Horror" for series 7 and "Robot of Sherwood" for series 8. He also wrote "Sleep No More" for series 9 and "Empress of Mars" for series 10. He has also contributed to the franchise outside the main show. His early work (see above) was primarily Doctor Who expanded media.

Gatiss wrote and performed in the comedy spoof sketches The Web of Caves, The Kidnappers and The Pitch of Fear for the BBC's "Doctor Who Night" in 1999 with David Walliams. He penned the 2013 docudrama An Adventure in Space and Time, a drama depicting the origins of the series, to celebrate the show's fiftieth anniversary. It ended with a cameo by Gatiss's League of Gentleman castmate Reece Shearsmith, portraying Patrick Troughton, who played the Second Doctor. A "Making Of" feature about this programme, narrated by Gatiss, was made available on the BBC Red Button service, and also posted on the BBC's official YouTube channel. He has written for Doctor Who Magazine, including a column written under the pseudonym "Sam Kisgart," which he was originally credited as in the Doctor Who Unbound audio play Sympathy for the Devil for his role as the Master. "Sam Kisgart" is an anagram of "Mark Gatiss", and is also the name under which he was credited for his cameo in Psychoville.

Novels

Gatiss has written several non-fiction works, including a biography of the film director James Whale and the documentary M.R. James: Ghost Writer, which Gatiss also presented. The documentary followed Gatiss's directorial debut with an adaption of one of James's stories, "The Tractate Middoth", for BBC Two, which was broadcast on Christmas Day 2013. His first non-Doctor Who novel, The Vesuvius Club, was published in 2004, for which he was nominated in the category of Best Newcomer in the 2006 British Book Awards.

A follow-up, The Devil in Amber, was released on 6 November 2006. It transports the main character, Lucifer Box, from the Edwardian era in the first book to the roaring Twenties/Thirties. A third and final Lucifer Box novel, Black Butterfly, was published on 3 November 2008 by Simon & Schuster.

== Personal life ==
Gatiss was featured on The Independent on Sunday's Pink List of influential gay people in the UK in 2010, 2011 and 2014. He entered into a civil partnership with Ian Hallard in 2008 in Middle Temple, in the City of London.

Gatiss once built a Victorian era laboratory in his north London home, as the fulfilment of a childhood dream. Gatiss is an atheist.

The University of Huddersfield awarded him an honorary doctorate of letters in 2003. The University of Leeds awarded him an honorary doctorate from the Faculty of Arts, Humanities and Cultures in 2024.

== Performances and works ==
=== Film and television ===
==== As actor in film ====
Year	Title	Role	Notes
1994	P.R.O.B.E.: The Zero Imperative	Dr. William Bruffin	Video; also writer
1995	P.R.O.B.E.: The Devil of Winterborne	Georgie	Video; also writer
1996	P.R.O.B.E.: Unnatural Selection	Mr. Emerson	Video; also writer
1999	The Comedy Trail: A Shaggy Dog Story	Hilary Briss	TV special
2001	Birthday Girl	Porter	
2003	Bright Young Things	Estate agent	
2004	Sex Lives of the Potato Men	Jeremy	
2004	Shaun of the Dead	Radio Presenter With 'Spaceship' Theory; Wildlife voiceover	Voice; Uncredited
2005	The Hitchhiker's Guide to the Galaxy	Additional Vogon voices	Collectively credited as "The League of Gentlemen"
2005	Match Point	Ping pong player	
2005	The League of Gentlemen's Apocalypse	Various characters / Himself	Also writer
2005	Wallace & Gromit: The Curse of the Were-Rabbit	Miss Blight (voice)	
2006	Starter for 10	Bamber Gascoigne	
2006	The League of Gentlemen Are Behind You!	Various	
2007	Grindhouse	Eye Gouging Victim	Segment: Don't
2008	Free Jimmy	Jakki (voice)	English dub
2015	Victor Frankenstein	Dettweiler	
2016	Dad's Army	Colonel Theakes	
2016	Our Kind of Traitor	Billy Matlock	
2016	Absolutely Fabulous: The Movie	Publisher	
2016	Denial	Robert Jan van Pelt	
2018	The Mercy	Ronald Hall	
2018	Christopher Robin	Giles Winslow	
2018	The Favourite	Marlborough	
2020	The Father	Bill	
2021	Locked Down	Terry	
2021	The Sparks Brothers	Himself	
2021	A Silent Imprisonment	Mr. Murphy	Short film
2021	The Road Dance	Doctor Maclean	
2021	Operation Mincemeat	Ivor Montagu	
2023	Mission: Impossible – Dead Reckoning Part One	Angstrom	
2025	Mission: Impossible – The Final Reckoning	Angstrom	
2025	The Fantastic Four: First Steps	Ted Gilbert	

==== As actor in television ====
Year	Title	Role	Notes
1993	Harry	Diner Manager	Episode #1.5
1994	Catherine Cookson's "The Dwelling Place"	Bowmer	Episode #1.3
1998	In the Red	Junior Detective	3 episodes
1998–1999	This Morning with Richard Not Judy	Various voices	18 episodes; uncredited
1999–2002, 2017	The League of Gentlemen	Various characters	Also co-creator and co-writer
2000	Randall & Hopkirk (Deceased)	Inspector Large	Episode: "Drop Dead"; also writer
2000	Barbara	Archie	Episode: "Christening"
2001	Spaced	Agent	Episode: "Back"
2001	Dr. Terrible's House of Horrible	Hang Man Chang	Episode: "Frenzy of Tongs"
2002	Robbie the Reindeer in Legend of the Lost Tribe	Viking (voice)	Television film
2003	Little Britain	Theatrical Agent	Episode: "Smallest Ant"
2004	Catterick	Peter	Episode #1.5
2004	Footballers' Wives	Teddy – Agent	Episode #3.7
2004	Agatha Christie: A Life in Pictures	Kenyon	Television film
2004	Agatha Christie's Marple	Ronald Hawes	Episode: "The Murder at the Vicarage"
2004–2005	Nighty Night	Glenn Bulb	10 episodes; also writer
2005	The Quatermass Experiment	John Patterson	Television film
2005	Funland	Ambrose Chapfel	4 episodes
2006	Fear of Fanny	Johnnie Cradock	Television film
2006	The Wind in the Willows	Ratty	Television film
2007	Gina's Laughing Gear		Episode: "Stairlift to Heaven"
2007	The Worst Journey in the World	Apsley Cherry-Garrard	Television film; also writer
2007	Jekyll	Robert Louis Stevenson	Episode #1.5
2007	Consenting Adults	PC Butcher	Television film
2007, 2010– 2011, 2017	Doctor Who	Professor Lazarus / Danny Boy / Gantok / The Captain	5 episodes; also writer
2008	Sense and Sensibility	John Dashwood	Miniseries, 2 episodes
2008	Agatha Christie's Poirot	Leonard Boynton	Episode: "Appointment with Death"; also writer
2008	Clone	Colonel Black	6 episodes
2008	Crooked House	Curator	Miniseries, also creator and writer
2009	Psychoville	Jason Griffin	Episode: "David and Maureen"
2009	Spanish Flu: The Forgotten Fallen	Ernest Dunks	Television film
2010	Midsomer Murders	Rev. Giles Shawcross	Episode: "The Sword of Guillaume"
2010	Worried About the Boy	Malcolm McLaren	Television film
2010	The First Men in the Moon	Professor Cavor	Television film; also writer
2010	A History of Horror	Himself	Documentary; also writer
2010–2017	Sherlock	Mycroft Holmes	Also co-creator and writer of 6 episodes
2011	The Infinite Monkey Cage	Himself	Episode: "The Science of Christmas"
2011	The Crimson Petal and the White	Henry Rackham Junior	Miniseries, 2 episodes
2012	Being Human	Mr Snow	2 episodes
2012	Inspector George Gently	Stephen Groves	Episode: "The Lost Child"
2012	Horror Europa	Himself	Documentary; also writer
2013	Psychobitches	Joan Crawford	Episode #1.1
2013	Horrible Histories	Hollywood Producer No. 2	Recurring role; as part of "The League of Gentlemen"
2014	Mapp & Lucia	Major Benjy	3 episodes
2014–2017	Game of Thrones	Tycho Nestoris	4 episodes
2015	Wolf Hall	Stephen Gardiner	4 episodes
2015	Coalition	Peter Mandelson	Television film
2015	The Vote	Steven Crosswell	Television film
2015	London Spy	Rich	Episode: "Blue"
2016	Mid Morning Matters with Alan Partridge	The Partridge Playhouse Players (voice)	Episode: "Foxhunter + Radio Play"
2017	Taboo	Prince George	5 episodes
2017	Thunderbirds Are Go	Professor Quentin Questa (voice)	Episode: "Volcano!"
2017	Gunpowder	Robert Cecil	3 episodes
2017–2018	Horizon	Narrator	2 episodes
2018	Sally4Ever	Doctor	2 episodes
2018	The Dead Room	Radio Announcer (voice)	Television film; also writer
2019	Brexit: The Uncivil War	Peter Mandelson (voice)	Television film
2019	Good Omens	Harmony	2 episodes
2020	Dracula	Frank Renfield	Episode: "The Dark Compass", also co-creator and writer
2020	In Search of Dracula with Mark Gatiss	Himself (presenter)	Television documentary film
2021	The Amazing Mr. Blunden	Mr Wickens	Television film; also writer and director
2022–2024	Inside No. 9	Callum / Himself (cameo)	2 episodes: "Merrily, Merrily" and "Plodding On"
2023	Nolly	Larry Grayson	
2024	3 Body Problem	Isaac Newton	Episode: "Destroyer of Worlds"
2024	Time Bandits	John Montagu, 4th Earl of Sandwich	Episode: "Georgian"
2024	Moonflower Murders	Frank Parris / Oskar Berlin	
2025–present	Bookish	Gabriel Book	Main role

==== Writer ====
Production	Notes	Broadcaster
P.R.O.B.E.	The Zero Imperative (1994); The Devil of Winterbourne (1995); Unnatural Selection (1996); Ghosts of Winterbourne (1996) (released direct to video)	N/A
Randall & Hopkirk	"Two Can Play at That Game" (2001) "Painkillers" (2001)	BBC One
The League of Gentlemen	Also co-creator 22 episodes (1999–2002, 2017) (with Jeremy Dyson, Steve Pemberton and Reece Shearsmith)	BBC Two
The League of Gentlemen's Apocalypse	Feature film (2005) (with Jeremy Dyson, Steve Pemberton and Reece Shearsmith)	N/A
Doctor Who	9 episodes; "The Unquiet Dead" (2005); "The Idiot's Lantern" (2006); "Victory of the Daleks" (2010); "Night Terrors" (2011); "Cold War" (2013); "The Crimson Horror" (2013); "Robot of Sherwood" (2014); "Sleep No More" (2015); "Empress of Mars" (2017)	BBC One
The Worst Journey in the World	TV film (2007)	BBC Four
Crooked House	Also creator 3 episodes (2008)	BBC Four
Agatha Christie's Poirot	"Cat Among the Pigeons" (2008) "Hallowe'en Party" (2010) "The Big Four" (2013)	ITV
Sherlock	7 episodes, 1 miniepisode, also co-creator (with Steven Moffat); "The Great Game" (2010); "The Hounds of Baskerville" (2012); "Many Happy Returns" (2013); "The Empty Hearse" (2014); "The Sign of Three" (2014) (with Steven Moffat and Steve Thompson); "The Abominable Bride" (2016) (with Steven Moffat); "The Six Thatchers" (2017); "The Final Problem" (2017) (with Steven Moffat)	BBC One
The First Men in the Moon	TV film (2010)	BBC Four
An Adventure in Space and Time	TV film (2013)	BBC Two
A Ghost Story for Christmas	"The Tractate Middoth" (2013) "The Dead Room" (2018) "Martin's Close" (2019) The Mezzotint (2021); Count Magnus (2022); Lot No. 249 (2023); Woman of Stone (2024)	BBC Two/BBC Four
The Lost Man of British Art, John Minton	Writer/Presenter (2018)	BBC
Dracula	Miniseries (2020)	BBC One

==== Director ====
Year	Title	Notes
2013	The Tractate Middoth	Short film
2017	Queers	Mini-series; also producer, wrote screen play for "The Man On The Platform"
2018	The Dead Room	Short film
2019	Martin's Close	Short film
2021	The Mezzotint	Short film
2021	The Amazing Mr. Blunden	TV film
2022	Count Magnus	TV film
2023	Lot No. 249	TV film
2024	Woman of Stone	TV film

=== Theatre ===
==== Actor ====
Year	Title	Role	Playwright	Venue
1995	The League of Gentlemen	Various	Gatiss, Steve Pemberton, Reece Shearsmith and Jeremy Dyson	Edinburgh Fringe
2001	The League of Gentlemen: A Local Show for Local People	Various	Gatiss, Steve Pemberton, Reece Shearsmith and Jeremy Dyson	UK tour and Theatre Royal, Drury Lane
2002	Art	Serg	Yasmina Reza (translated by Christopher Hampton)	Whitehall Theatre
2005	The League of Gentlemen Are Behind You!	Various	Gatiss, Steve Pemberton, Reece Shearsmith and Jeremy Dyson	UK tour and Hammersmith Apollo
2007	All About My Mother	Agrado	Samuel Adamson	The Old Vic
2009	Darker Shores	Stokes	Michael Punter	Hampstead Theatre
2010	Season's Greetings	Bernard	Alan Ayckbourn	Lyttelton Theatre (National Theatre)
2012	The Recruiting Officer	Captain Brazen	George Farquhar	Donmar Warehouse
2012	55 Days	King Charles I	Howard Brenton	Hampstead Theatre
2013	Coriolanus	Menenius	William Shakespeare	Donmar Warehouse
2015	The Vote	Steven Crosswell	James Graham	Donmar Warehouse
2015	Three Days in the Country	Shpigelsky	Patrick Marber	Lyttelton Theatre (National Theatre)
2016	The Boys in the Band	Harold	Mart Crowley	Park Theatre, Vaudeville Theatre
2018	The League of Gentlemen Live Again!	Various	Gatiss, Steve Pemberton, Reece Shearsmith and Jeremy Dyson	UK tour and Hammersmith Apollo
2018	The Madness of George III	George III	Alan Bennett	Nottingham Playhouse
2019	Dark Sublime	Kosley the Computer	Michael Dennis	Trafalgar Theatre 2
2021	A Christmas Carol: A Ghost Story	Jacob Marley	Charles Dickens (adapted by Gatiss)	Nottingham Playhouse and Alexandra Palace
2023	The Motive and the Cue	Sir John Gielgud	Jack Thorne	Lyttelton Theatre (National Theatre) and Noël Coward Theatre
2026	The Resistible Rise of Arturo Ui	Arturo Ui	Bertolt Brecht (translated by Stephen Sharkey)	Swan Theatre, Stratford-upon-Avon (Royal Shakespeare Company)

==== Writer ====
Year	Title	Venue
1995	The League of Gentlemen (with Jeremy Dyson, Steve Pemberton and Reece Shearsmith)	Edinburgh Fringe
2001	The League of Gentlemen: A Local Show for Local People (with Jeremy Dyson, Steve Pemberton and Reece Shearsmith)	UK tour and Theatre Royal, Drury Lane
2005	The League of Gentlemen Are Behind You! (with Jeremy Dyson, Steve Pemberton and Reece Shearsmith)	UK tour and Hammersmith Apollo
2018	The League of Gentlemen Live Again! (with Jeremy Dyson, Steve Pemberton and Reece Shearsmith)	UK tour and Hammersmith Apollo
2021–2025	A Christmas Carol: A Ghost Story (from the novel by Charles Dickens)	Nottingham Playhouse, Alexandra Palace Theatre and Birmingham Repertory Theatre

==== Director ====
Year	Title	Playwright	Venue
2022–2024	The Unfriend	Steven Moffat	Minerva Theatre, Chichester, Criterion Theatre and Wyndham's Theatre
2023	The Way Old Friends Do	Ian Hallard	Birmingham Repertory Theatre, UK tour and Criterion Theatre

== Awards and nominations ==
Year	Association	Category	Project	Result	Ref.
2011	BAFTA TV Award	Best Drama Series	Sherlock	Won	
2014	BAFTA TV Award	Best Single Drama	An Adventure in Space and Time	Nominated	
2011	Peabody Award		Sherlock: A Study in Pink	Won	
2012	Primetime Emmy Awards	Outstanding Miniseries or Movie	Sherlock: A Scandal in Belgravia	Nominated	
2014	Primetime Emmy Awards	Outstanding Television Movie	Sherlock: His Last Vow	Nominated	
2016	Primetime Emmy Awards	Outstanding Television Movie	Sherlock: The Abominable Bride	Won	
2017	Primetime Emmy Awards	Outstanding Television Movie	Sherlock: The Lying Detective	Nominated	
2014	Laurence Olivier Awards	Best Actor in a Supporting Role	Coriolanus	Nominated	
2016	Laurence Olivier Awards	Best Actor in a Supporting Role	Three Days in the Country	Won	
2024	Laurence Olivier Awards	Best Actor	The Motive and the Cue	Won	

== Bibliography ==
Doctor Who novels

- Nightshade (ISBN 0-426-20376-3)
- St Anthony's Fire (ISBN 0-426-20423-9)
- The Roundheads (ISBN 0-563-40576-7)
- Last of the Gaderene (ISBN 0-563-55587-4; also 2013 reissue ISBN 1-849-90597-5)
- The Crimson Horror (ISBN 978-1-78594-504-5)

Doctor Who anthology contributions

- Doctor Who: The Shooting Scripts (teleplay "The Unquiet Dead") (ISBN 0-5634-8641-4)
- The Doctor Who Storybook 2007 (short story "Cuckoo-Spit") (ISBN 1-84653-001-6)
- The Doctor Who Storybook 2009 (short story "Cold") (ISBN 1-846-53067-9)
- The Doctor Who Storybook 2010 (short story "Scared Stiff") (ISBN 1-84653-095-4)
- The Brilliant Book of Doctor Who 2011 (short fiction The Lost Diaries of Winston Spencer Churchill) (ISBN 1-8460-7991-8)
- The Brilliant Book of Doctor Who 2012 (short fiction George's Diary) (ISBN 1-8499-0230-5)

The League of Gentlemen

- A Local Book for Local People (ISBN 1-84115-346-X)
- The League of Gentlemen: Scripts and That (ISBN 0-563-48775-5)
- The League of Gentlemen's Book of Precious Things (ISBN 1-853-75621-0)

Lucifer Box novels

- The Vesuvius Club (ISBN 0-7432-5706-5)
- The Devil in Amber (ISBN 0-7432-5709-X)
- Black Butterfly (ISBN 0-7432-57111)

Miscellaneous non-fiction

- James Whale: A Biography (ISBN 0-3043-2863-4)
- They Came From Outer Space!: Alien Encounters in the Movies (with David Miller) (ISBN 978-1901018004)

Miscellaneous fiction

- The King's Men (as "Christian Fall") (ISBN 0-3523-3207-7).
- The EsseX Files: To Basildon and Beyond (with Jeremy Dyson) (ISBN 1-8570-2747-7).

Audio plays

- 2000 AD (Judge Dredd audio) Death Trap

Doctor Who (and related)

- Time Travellers: Republica
- Time Travellers: Island of Lost Souls
- Phantasmagoria
- Invaders from Mars

== See also ==
- List of British actors
- List of Primetime Emmy Award winners
