= List of works by George Moore =

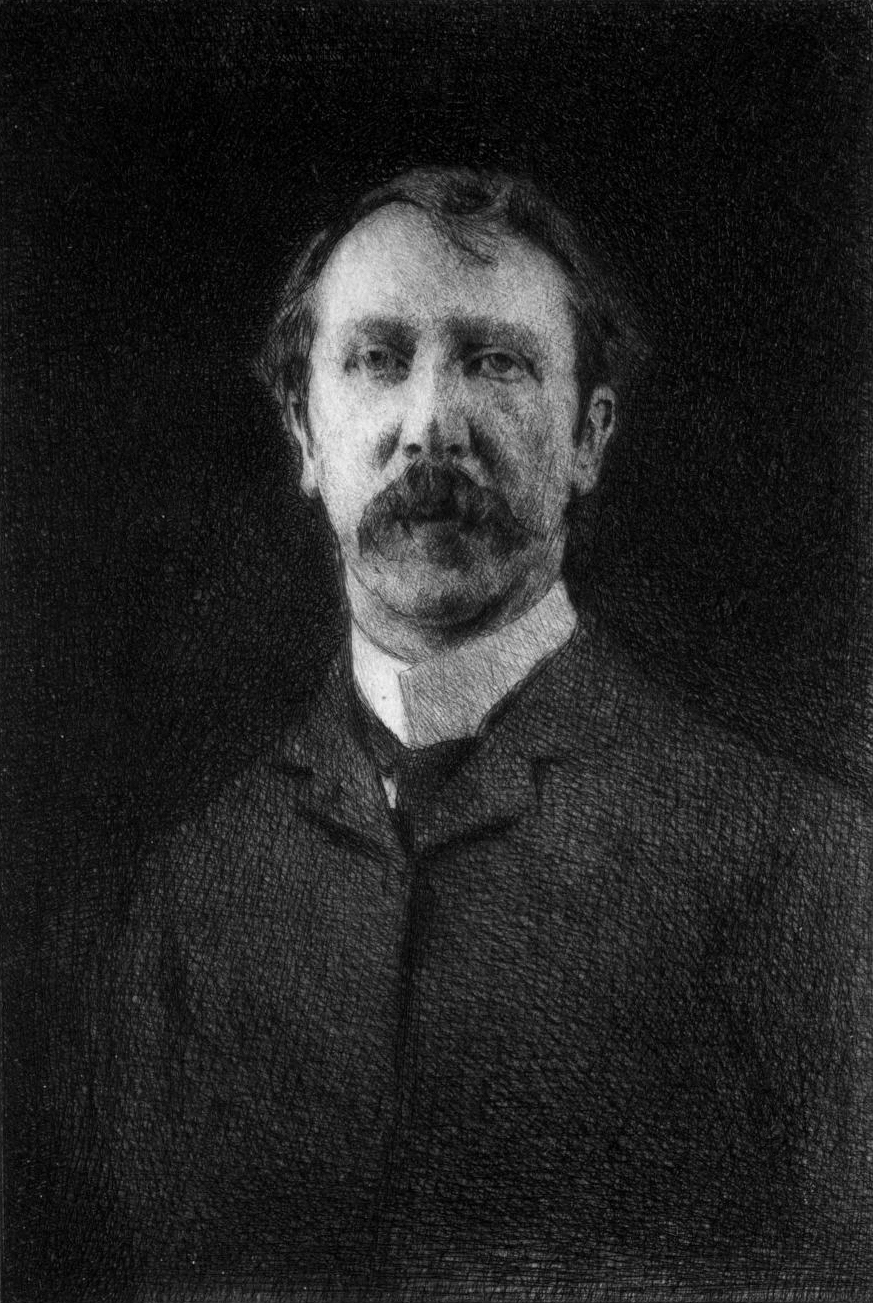
George Moore ca. 1888

The following is an incomplete list of works by the Irish novelist, short-story writer and poet George Moore.

- Flowers of Passion London: Provost & Company, 1878
- Martin Luther: A Tragedy in Five Acts London: Remington & Company, 1879
- Pagan Poems London: Newman & Company, 1881
- A Modern Lover London: Tinsley Brothers, 1883
- A Mummer's Wife London: Vizetelly & Company, 1885
- Literature at Nurse London: Vizetelly & Company, 1885
- A Drama in Muslin London: Vizetelly & Company, 1886
- A Mere Accident London: Vizetelly & Company, 1887
- Parnell and His Island London: Swan Sonnenshein Lowrey & Company, 1887
- Confessions of a Young Man London: Swan Sonnenshein Lowrey & Company, 1888
- Spring Days London: Vizetelly & Company, 1888
- Mike Fletcher London: Ward & Downey, 1889
- Impressions and Opinions London: David Nutt, 1891
- Vain Fortune London: Henry & Company, 1891
- Modern Painting London: Walter Scott, 1893
- The Strike at Arlingford London: Walter Scott, 1893
- Esther Waters London: Walter Scott, 1894
- Celibates London: Walter Scott, 1895
- Evelyn Innes London: T. Fisher Unwin, 1898
- The Bending of the Bough London: T. Fisher Unwin, 1900
- Sister Teresa London: T. Fisher Unwin, 1901
- The Untilled Field London: T. Fisher Unwin, 1903
- The Lake London: William Heinemann, 1905
- Memoirs of My Dead Life London: William Heinemann, 1906
- Reminiscences of the Impressionist Painters, 1906
- The Apostle: A Drama in Three Acts Dublin: Maunsel & Company, 1911
- Hail and Farewell London: William Heinemann, 1911, 1912, 1914
- Elizabeth Cooper Dublin: Maunsel & Company, 1913
- Muslin London: William Heinemann, 1915
- The Brook Kerith: A Syrian Story London: T. Warner Laurie, 1916
- Lewis Seymour and Some Women London: William Heinemann, 1917 (reworking of A Modern Lover)
- A Story-Teller's Holiday London: Cumann Sean-eolais na hÉireann (privately printed), 1918
- Avowals London: Cumann Sean-eolais na hÉireann (privately printed), 1919
- The Coming of Gabrielle London: Cumann Sean-eolais na hÉireann (privately printed), 1920
- Heloise and Abelard London: Cumann Sean-eolais na hÉireann (privately printed), 1921
- In Single Strictness London: William Heinemann, 1922
- Conversations in Ebury Street London: William Heinemann, 1924
- Pure Poetry: An Anthology London: Nonesuch Press, 1924
- The Pastoral Loves of Daphnis and Chloe London: William Heinemann, 1924
- Daphnis and Chloe, Peronnik the Fool New York: Boni & Liveright, 1924
- Ulick and Soracha London: Nonesuch Press, 1926
- Celibate Lives London: William Heinemann, 1927 (reworking of Celibates including the short story "Albert Nobbs" from A Story-Teller's Holiday, which was made into a film starring Glenn Close in 2011.)
- The Making of an Immortal New York: Bowling Green Press, 1927
- The Passing of the Essenes: A Drama in Three Acts London: William Heinemann, 1930
- Aphrodite in Aulis New York: Fountain Press, 1930
- The Talking Pine Paris: The Hours Press, 1931
- A Communication to My Friends London: Nonesuch Press, 1933
- Diarmuid and Grania: A Play in Three Acts Co-written with W. B. Yeats, Edited by Anthony Farrow, Chicago: De Paul, 1974

Letters

- Moore Versus Harris Detroit: privately printed, 1921
- Letters from George Moore to Ed. Dujardin 1886-1922 New York: Crosby Gaige, 1929
- Letters of George Moore Bournemouth: Sydenham, 1942
- GM: Memories of George Moore by Nancy Cunard. London: Rupert Hart-Davis, 1956
- Letters to Lady Cunard Ed. Rupert Hart-Davis. London: Rupert Hart-Davis, 1957
- George Moore in Transition Ed. Helmut E. Gerber, Detroit: Wayne State University Press, 1968

== Sources ==
- Brown, Malcolm (1955). George Moore: A Reconsideration. Washington D.C.: University of Washington.
- Frazier, Adrian (2000). George Moore, 1852–1933. New Haven: Yale University Press. ISBN 0-300-08245-2.
- Grubgeld, Elizabeth (1994). George Moore and the Autogenous Self. Oklahoma: Syracuse University Press. ISBN 978-0-81562-615-2.
- Morris, Lloyd R. (1917). The Celtic Dawn: A Survey of the Renascence in Ireland 1889–1916. New York: The Macmillan Company.
