= Red Hollywood =

1996 American documentary film

Red Hollywood is a 1996 American documentary film by film essayists Thom Andersen and Noël Burch about the films made by the blacklisted writers and directors during the 1930s-1950s.

== Summary ==
Narrated by African-American filmmaker Billy Woodberry, the essay (originated by Andersen in 1985 before being expanded in book form by Bruch) is a revisionist history of the left-leaning filmmakers that were responsible for Hollywood's portraits of the social issues of the 20th Century drawing from 53 features.

Interviewed were some of The Hollywood Ten including Abraham Polonsky and Ring Lardner, Jr. alongside fellow blacklisted artists Paul Jarrico and Alfred Levitt.

== Reception ==
Red Hollywood received a 75% rating on Rotten Tomatoes.

== See also ==
- Social realism
- Film gris
- Mcarthyism
- Message picture
- Los Angeles Plays Itself - 2003 video essay by Andersen
- What Do Those Old Films Mean? - 1985 documentary miniseries by Bruch about silent films in social contact
- United States in the 1950s
