= Esther Waters (1964 TV series) =

British television series

- Genre: Historical drama
- Based on: Esther Waters by George Moore
- Written by: Harry Green
- Directed by: James Cellan Jones
- Starring: Meg Wynn Owen; John Bennett; Gwendolyn Watts
- Composer: Dudley Simpson
- Country of origin: United Kingdom
- Original language: English
- No. of series: 1
- No. of episodes: 4

Production
- Producer: Douglas Allen
- Running time: 45 minutes
- Production company: BBC

Original release
- Network: BBC Two
- Release: 14 November – 5 December 1964

Esther Waters is a British period drama television series that originally aired on BBC 2 in four episodes from 14 November to 5 December 1964. It is an adaptation of the 1894 novel of the same title by George Moore. Like the novel it focuses on the struggle of Esther Waters who, in Victorian England, is abandoned by her lover when pregnant. Despite the social stigma of being a fallen woman she chooses to raise the child as a single mother.

The novel had previously been made into a 1948 film Esther Waters. A further television adaptation Esther Waters followed in 1977.

== Main cast ==
- Meg Wynn Owen as Esther Waters
- John Bennett as William Latch
- Pauline Letts as Mrs. Barfield
- Gwendolyn Watts as Margaret Gale
- Daphne Heard as Mrs. Latch
- Gordon Gostelow as Fred Parsons
- Anne Ridler as Miss Rice
- Carl Bernard as Mr. Randall
- Blake Butler as Mr. Ward
- Elizabeth Bell as Sarah
- John Dearth as Esther's father
- Ruth Porcher as Esther's mother
- Tracy Reed as Miss Peggy
- Doris Hare as Mrs. Randall

== Bibliography ==
- Baskin, Ellen . Serials on British Television, 1950-1994. Scolar Press, 1996.
