= Deborah Stratman =

American artist and filmmaker (born 1967)

Deborah Stratman (born 1967) is a Chicago-based artist and filmmaker who explores landscapes and systems. Her body of work spans multiple media, including public sculpture, photography, drawing and audio.

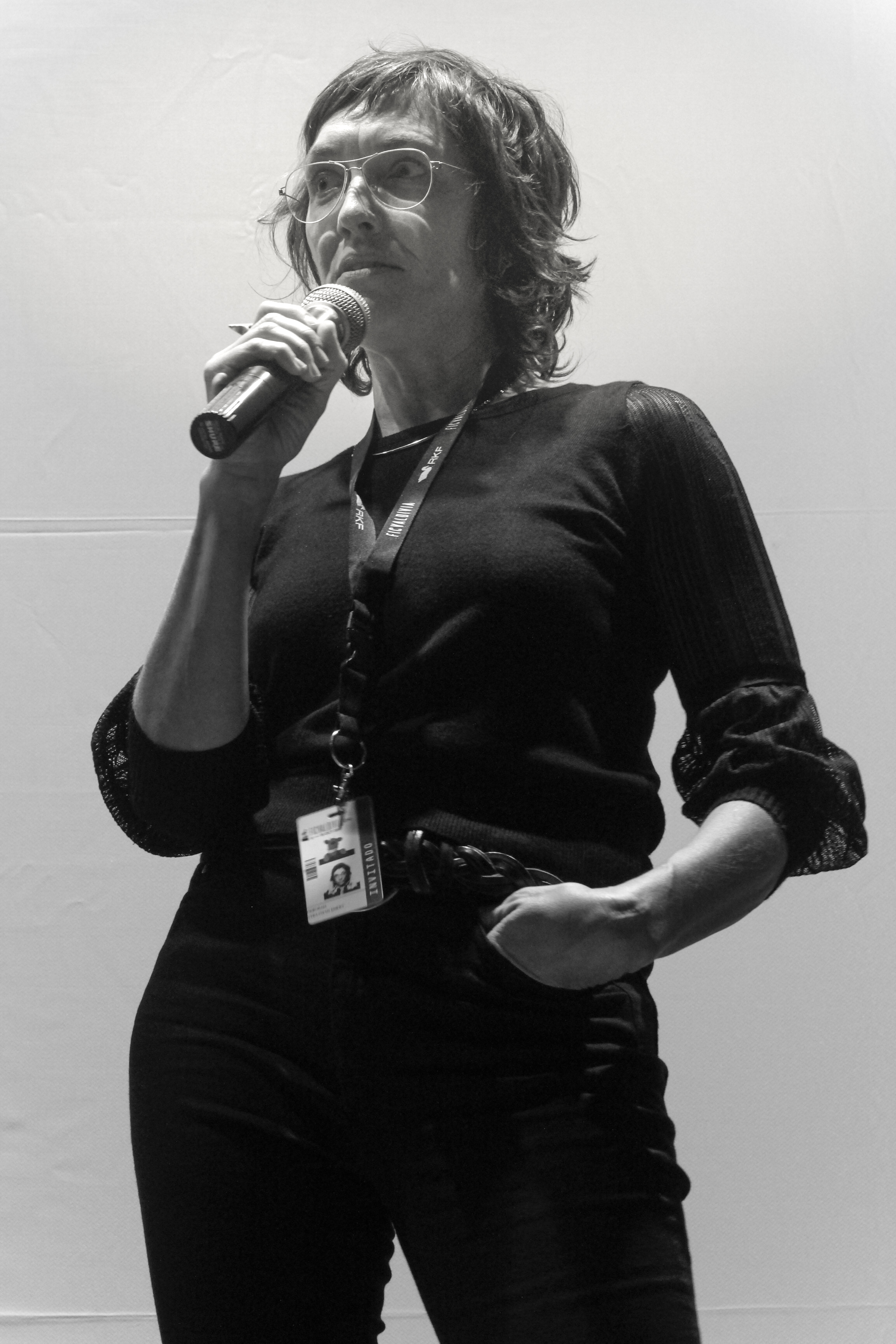
Deborah Stratman in FIC Valdivia, Chile 2017

== Biography ==
Stratman's work has been exhibited internationally at venues including the 2004 Whitney Biennial, Museum of Modern Art, the Centre Georges Pompidou, Hammer Museum, Witte de With, Walker Art Center, Yerba Buena Center, ICA London, MCA Chicago, Walker Art Center, Wexner Center for the Arts, Museum of the Moving Image NY, Robert Flaherty Film Seminar, Anthology Film Archives, Pacific Film Archives, Los Angeles Film Forum, San Francisco Cinemateque, REDCAT Los Angeles, Gene Siskel Film Center, Harvard Film Archives, Her work has screened extensively at Film Festivals such as Rotterdam Int’l Film Festival, Oberhausen Short Film Festival, Ann Arbor Film Festival, Images Festival, Toronto Int’l Film Festival, New York Film Festival, and the Sundance Film Festival, and many others.

Deborah Stratman is currently an Associate Professor in the School of Art & Art History at the University of Illinois at Chicago. She earned her MFA from California Institute of the Arts (1995), and her BFA from The School of the Art Institute of Chicago (1990).

== Filmmaking ==
She credits Barbara Loden's Wanda, Jon Jost, Robert Nelson, Hollis Frampton, Jean Rouch, Straub-Huillet and Agnès Varda as key influences. Stratman's filmmaking style comes out of an experimental documentary tradition, though more recent films have incorporated staging and re-enactment. She typically directs, shoots, edits and designs the sound for each production. Her films, rather than telling stories, pose a series of problems – and through their at times ambiguous nature, allow for a complicated reading of the questions being asked. Much of her work points to the relationships between physical environments and the very human struggles for power and control that are played out on the land. Most recently, they have questioned elemental historical narratives about faith, freedom, sonic subterfuge, expansionism and the paranormal.

== Other projects ==
Stratman has completed a number of installations, public sculptures, and other projects, including collaborations with Steven Badgett. Her installation, "Tactical Uses of a Belief in the Unseen" (2010) was an Artforum Critic's Pick. The installation "draws on urban crowd control strategies that were used by the Central Intelligence Agency's Audio Harassment Division during the Vietnam War." Her work "Ball and Horns (aka Desert Resonator and Range Trumpet)", (2011 – ongoing) in collaboration with Steven Badgett, is permanently installed at the Center for Land Use Interpretation's Desert Research Station in Hinkley, California. While for "FEAR (Decade)" (2004–2014) Stratman set up a toll-free phone number where she invited the public to share what they were most afraid of. The responses were recorded, edited, and compiled onto an audio CD and broadcast over the radio on WLUW (88.7 fm). The FEAR hotline closed in 2014. In 2014 she participated in Chicago Film Archives' CFA Media Mixer project with Olivia Block. Together they created the 5-minute film, Second Sighted, utilizing solely films from CFA's collections.

Stratman has screen credits for her camera work on Thom Andersen's films Los Angeles Plays Itself (2003) and Get Out of the Car (2010).

== Awards ==
Stratman's multi-disciplined art practice has been recognized and supported by a number of prestigious granting organizations and awards. She has received the United States Artists (USA) Fellowship (2015), the Herb Alpert Award in the Arts (2014), Creative Capital Award (2012), Guggenheim Fellowship (2003), Fulbright Fellowship (1995–96).

Stratman's films and videos have won numerous awards at film festivals, including: Special Jury Prize, 50th Ann Arbor Film Festival, Ann Arbor, Michigan: Ray's Birds. 2011; New Vision Award, CPH:DOX International Documentary Film Festival: O’er the Land. 2009; Ken Burns Award for Best of the Festival, 47th Ann Arbor Film Festival: O’er the Land. 2009; Best International On Screen (Film) Award, 22nd Images Festival: O’er the Land. 2009

== Filmography ==
- My Alchemy, 1990, 16mm, 7 minutes
- Upon a Time, 1991, 16mm, 10 minutes
- A Letter, 1992, video, 7 minutes
- Possibilities, Dilemmas, 1992, video, 10 minutes
- the train from l.a. to l.a., 1992, video, 8 minutes
- In Flight: Day No. 2,128, 1993, 16mm, 2 minutes
- Palimpsest, 1993, 16mm, 3 minutes
- Waking, 1994, video, 7 minutes
- Iolanthe, 1995, video, 4:30 minutes
- On The Various Nature Of Things, 1995, 16mm, 25 minutes
- From Hetty To Nancy, 1997, 16mm, 44 minutes
- The BLVD, 1999, video, 64 minutes
- Untied, 2001, 16mm, 3 minutes
- In Order Not To Be Here, 2002, 16mm, 33 minutes
- Energy Country, 2003, video, 14:30 minutes
- Kings Of The Sky, 2004, video, 68 minutes
- How Among The Frozen Words, 2005, video, 44 seconds
- It Will Die Out In The Mind, 2006, video, 3:50 minutes
- The Magician's House, 2007, 16mm, 5:45 minutes
- The Memory, 2008, video, 2 minutes
- O'er The Land, 2009, 16mm, 51:40 minutes
- Kuyenda N’kubvina, 2010, video, 40:00 minutes
- FF, 2010, video, 2:45 minutes
- Shrimp Chicken Fish, 2010, video, 5:13 minutes
- Ray's Birds, 2010, 16mm, 7:07 minutes
- ...These Blazeing Starrs!, 2011, 16mm, 14:16 minutes
- Village, silenced, 2012, video, 4:55 mins
- The Name is not the Thing named, 2012, video, 10:30 mins
- Musical Insects, 2013, video, 6:30 mins
- Immortal, Suspended, 2013, HD video, 5:50 mins
- Hacked Circuit, 2014, HD video, 15:05 mins
- Second Sighted, 2014, video, 5 mins
- The Illinois Parables, 2016, 16mm, 60 mins
- Xenoi, 2016, video, 15:20 mins
- Siege, 2017, 4-channel HD video, 7 mins
- Optimism, 2018, Super 8 transferred to HD video, 14:43 mins
- Vever (for Barbara), 2019, 16mm transferred to HD video, 12 mins
- For the Time Being, 2021, HD video, 6:40 mins
- Laika, 2021, HD video, 4:33 mins
- Last Things, 2023, 35mm, 50 mins
- Otherhood, 2023, 16mm transferred to HD video, 3 mins
