= The Sound of Fury (film) =

1950 film by Cy Endfield

- Theatrical release poster
- Directed by: Cy Endfield
- Screenplay by: Jo Pagano
- Based on: The Condemned; 1947 novel by Jo Pagano
- Produced by: Robert Stillman
- Starring: Frank Lovejoy; Kathleen Ryan; Richard Carlson
- Cinematography: Guy Roe
- Edited by: George Amy
- Music by: Hugo Friedhofer
- Color process: Black and white
- Production company: Robert Stillman Productions
- Distributed by: United Artists
- Release date: December 12, 1950
- Running time: 92 minutes
- Country: United States
- Language: English
- Budget: $410,000

The Sound of Fury (reissued as Try and Get Me!) is a 1950 American crime film noir directed by Cy Endfield and starring Frank Lovejoy, Kathleen Ryan, Richard Carlson. The film is based on the 1947 novel The Condemned by Jo Pagano, who also wrote the screenplay.

The Pagano novel was based on events that occurred in 1933 when two men were arrested in San Jose, California for the kidnapping and murder of Brooke Hart. The suspects confessed and were subsequently lynched by a mob of locals. The 1936 film Fury, directed by Fritz Lang, was inspired by the same incident.

== Plot ==
Howard Tyler is a family man from Boston, living in California with his wife and boy, who has trouble finding a job. He meets charismatic small-time hood Jerry Slocum, who hires Howard to participate in gas-station robberies. Later, Jerry concocts a plan to kidnap Donald Miller, the son of a wealthy man, to receive a large ransom. Things go wrong when Jerry kills the man and throws the body into a lake. Howard, who did not know that his and Jerry's criminal exploits would include murder, reaches his emotional limit and begins drinking heavily. He meets a lonely woman and, while drunk, confesses to the crime. The woman flees and informs the police.

When the two kidnappers are arrested, a local journalist writes a series of vicious articles about the two prisoners. A vicious mob assembles outside the police station, overpowers the guards and storms the building, seizing the two men in order to kill them.

== Cast ==
- Frank Lovejoy as Howard Tyler
- Kathleen Ryan as Judy Tyler
- Richard Carlson as Gil Stanton
- Lloyd Bridges as Jerry Slocum
- Katherine Locke as Hazel Weatherwax
- Adele Jergens as Velma
- Art Smith as Hal Clendenning
- Renzo Cesana as Dr. Vito Simone
- Irene Vernon as Helen Stanton
- Cliff Clark as Sheriff Lem Deming
- Harry Shannon as Mr. Yaeger
- Donald Doss as Tommy Tyler (as Donald Smelick)
- Joe E. Ross as Nightclub comic magician (uncredited)

== Production ==
The film was the first independent production from Robert Stillman, who had worked with Stanley Kramer, and signed a six picture deal with United Artists. The film starred Frank Lovejoy, who had been in Kramer's Home of the Brave.

Filming took place in Phoenix, Arizona.

The movie encountered censorship trouble in New York due to the last section.

== Reception and legacy ==
=== Critical response ===
New York Times film critic Bosley Crowther panned the film, writing: "Although Mr. Endfield has directed the violent climactic scenes with a great deal of sharp visualization of mass hysteria and heat, conveying a grim impression of the nastiness of a mob, he has filmed the rest of the picture in a conventional melodramatic style. Neither the script nor the numerous performances are of a distinctive quality," and that audiences had "to expend pity and resentment towards society in the cause of a common thief."

Raymond Borde and Etienne Chaumeton, in a work on American film noir, wrote that "the prison assault remains one of the most brutal sequences in postwar American cinema."

In 1998, Jonathan Rosenbaum of the Chicago Reader included the film in his unranked list of the best American films not included on the AFI Top 100.

The film was mentioned in Thom Andersen's 1996 video essay documentary Red Hollywood.

=== Accolades ===
Nominations

- British Academy of Film and Television Arts Awards: Best Film from Any Source, 1952.

=== Restoration ===
Among the final films made in the U.S. by blacklisted writer/director Cy Endfield before he relocated to England, The Sound of Fury has been restored by the Film Noir Foundation. The restored version was aired for the first time on Turner Classic Movies on January 25, 2020, and was introduced by Eddie Muller.
