= Esther Waters (film) =

1948 British film by Ian Dalrymple and Peter Proud

- Directed by: Ian Dalrymple; Peter Proud
- Written by: Michael Gordon; William Rose; Gerard Tyrrell (Additional dialogue)
- Based on: Esther Waters by George Moore
- Produced by: Ian Dalrymple; Peter Proud
- Starring: Kathleen Ryan; Dirk Bogarde
- Cinematography: C.M. Pennington-Richards; H.E. Fowle
- Edited by: Brereton Porter
- Music by: Gordon Jacob (as Dr. Gordon Jacob)
- Production companies: Independent Producers; Wessex Film Productions
- Distributed by: General Film Distributors (UK)
- Release date: 22 September 1948 (London)
- Running time: 108 minutes
- Country: United Kingdom
- Language: English
- Budget: £338,551
- Box office: £47,700 (by Dec 1949) or £32,900

Esther Waters is a 1948 British drama film directed by Ian Dalrymple and Peter Proud and starring Kathleen Ryan, Dirk Bogarde (first credited film appearance), and Cyril Cusack. It is an adaptation of the 1894 novel Esther Waters by George Moore.

== Plot ==
The film is set in London in 1875.

Esther goes into domestic service as a maid, only to be seduced by sweet-talking footman William. When he abandons her, she must deal with not only pregnancy but also her mother's death. She struggles to survive with only herself for comfort and strength.

She is forced to put her child into care in order to keep her job.

== Cast ==
- Kathleen Ryan as Esther Waters
- Dirk Bogarde as William Latch
- Cyril Cusack as Fred
- Ivor Barnard as John Randall
- Fay Compton as Mrs Barfield
- Margaret Diamond as Sarah
- George Hayes as journeyman
- Morland Graham as Ketley
- Mary Clare as Mrs. Latch
- Pauline Jameson as hospital nurse
- Shelagh Fraser as Margaret
- Margaret Withers as Grover
- Julian D'Albie as Squire Barfield
- Nuna Davey as matron
- Beryl Measor as Mrs. Spires
- Barbara Shaw as mistress
- Archie Harradine as singer
- Duncan Lewis as butcher

== Production ==
The movie was Dirk Bogarde's first film as a leading man, when he replaced Stewart Granger, who dropped out.

== Critical reception ==
The Monthly Film Bulletin wrote: "George Moore's novel, from which this film has been made, is a deeply moving sociological essay; the film itself is a disjointed account of the seduction of a strictly-brought-up servant girl, played with uninspired gravity by Kathleen Ryan, and her struggles to bring up her child in accordance with her own high principles. It is a film packed tight with 19th century hypocrisy and prejudice; so much attention is paid to detail that it becomes superfluous. An exciting scene of Derby Day (the painting by Frith comes to life) is too late to save the general tedium of the picture, but here the film becomes breathtakingly full of movement and colour. Harry Ross gives an excellent character study of a racecourse tout."

The Radio Times wrote: "George Moore's source novel was strongly influenced by the naturalism of Emile Zola, but there is little of the earthiness of the original in this tawdry adaptation, which rapidly plunges between the two stools of heritage production and sensationalist melodrama. Dirk Bogarde is suitably scurrilous as a rascally footman, but the action slows fatally when he is off screen, with Kathleen Ryan in the title role facing all her trials (single motherhood, the workhouse and Bogarde's drinking) with sulkiness rather than dignity and determination. The horse-racing scenes are efficiently presented, but Ian Dalrymple and Peter Proud direct with heavy hands"

TV Guide called the film "A well-done but melancholy costume drama from the book by the Irish playwright and critic George Moore, a cofounder of the theatre group that led to the famous Abbey Theatre."

Clive Donner called it "a hopless film... but beautifully made."

== Box office ==
Producer's receipts were £33,600 in the UK and it cost the producers £700 overseas. According to Rank's own records the film had made a loss of £305,706 for the company by December 1949.
