= Noël Burch =

French film critic

Noël Burch (born 1932) is an American film theorist and movie maker who moved to France at a young age. Burch is known for his contribution to terms commonly used by film scholars (such as institutional mode of representation (IMR)) and for his theories compiled in books such as Theory of Film Practice or La lucarne de L'Infini.

== Work ==
Burch's major contribution to the history of film theory is not his definition of classical Hollywood film tropes, which had already been done, but rather his focus on early cinema. There, he identified a set of film styles that he would identify as the primitive mode of representation (PMR). In doing so, he found what he thought was a "purer" cinema, one untainted by what he considered bourgeois ideology.

Whether his ideology informed his understanding of film style, or vice versa, his Theory of Film Practice is one of the key works in the canon of Western film theory.

In the foreword to the 1980 edition of Theory Of Film Practice, Burch repudiated some of his earlier theories, expanding on his younger self's limited conception of formalism as applied to the film arts. But, Burch insists the reader "sift out the nuggets that may still lie among the dross".

His book To The Distant Observer, while often criticized as a self-serving and selective idealization of Japanese aesthetics in the service of Burch's own anti-structuralist, Marxist ideology, was one of the first attempts by a Western film theorist to situate Japanese cinema within the context of traditional Japanese aesthetics.

His first movie, Noviciat, is an experimental short from 1964/65 in black and white.

In 2010, Burch received Venice Horizons Award on Venice Film Festival for documentary movie The Forgotten Space.

In January 2013, Burch launched fundraising campaign on Kickstarter.com to make the narrative movie The Gentle Art Of Tutelage.

== Filmography ==
- Noviciat (Dir: Noël Burch/FR/15min/1964-65)
- Correction, Please or How we got into pictures (Dir: Noël Burch/UK/57min/1979)
- The Year of the Bodyguard (Dir: Noël Burch/UK/57min/1981)
- What Do Those Old Films Mean? (Dir: Noël Burch/UK/FR/26min/1985)
- Red Hollywood (Dir: Noël Burch and Thom Andersen/USA/120min/1990)
- Sentimental Journey (Dir: Noël Burch/Germany/France/70min/1994)
- Cuba: Entre Chien et Louve (Dir: Noël Burch and Michèle Larue/France/57min/1997)
- La Fiancée du danger (Dir: Noël Burch and Michèle Larue/France/57min/2005)
- The Forgotten Space (Dir: Noël Burch and Allan Sekula/Netherlands/Austria/57min/2011)

== Sources ==
- Burch, Noel Theory of Film Practice
- Burch, Nöel (1979). To the Distant Observer: Form and Meaning in the Japanese Cinema. University of California Press. hdl:2027/spo.aaq5060.0001.001. ISBN 0-520-03605-0.
