= Eadweard Muybridge, Zoopraxographer =

1975 film

- Directed by: Thom Andersen
- Written by: Fay Andersen
- Produced by: Thom Andersen
- Starring: Eadweard Muybridge
- Narrated by: Dean Stockwell
- Cinematography: Morgan Fisher
- Edited by: Morgan Fisher
- Music by: Mike Cohen
- Production company: UCLA
- Distributed by: New Yorker Films
- Release date: 1975
- Running time: 59 minutes
- Country: United States
- Language: English

Eadweard Muybridge, Zoopraxographer is a 1975 student documentary film directed by Thom Andersen about the English photographer Eadweard Muybridge.

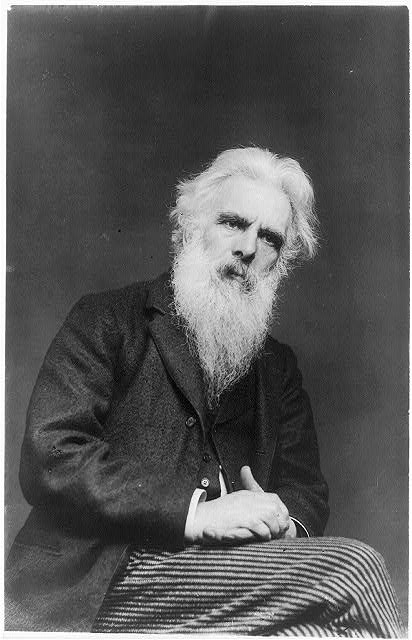
Eadweard Muybridge portrait from the Library of Congress

== Legacy ==
In 2015, the United States Library of Congress selected the film for preservation in the National Film Registry, finding it "culturally, historically, or aesthetically significant". Newly restored by the UCLA Film & Television Archive, it was released on home video in 2016 by Cinema Guild.

== Cast ==
- Eadweard Muybridge as Himself
- Dean Stockwell as Narrator

== See also ==
- List of American films of 1975
- Eadweard (film)
- Los Angeles Plays Itself
