= Esther Waters (1977 TV series) =

British television series

- Genre: Historical drama
- Based on: Esther Waters by George Moore
- Written by: Douglas Livingstone
- Directed by: Jane Howell
- Starring: Gabrielle Lloyd; James Laurenson; Alison Steadman
- Composer: Dudley Simpson
- Country of origin: United Kingdom
- Original language: English
- No. of series: 1
- No. of episodes: 4

Production
- Producer: Richard Beynon
- Running time: 50 minutes
- Production company: BBC

Original release
- Network: BBC Two
- Release: 10 April – 1 May 1977

Esther Waters is a British period drama television series that originally aired on BBC Two in four episodes from 10 April to 1 May 1977. It is an adaptation of the 1894 novel of the same title by George Moore. A previous BBC version Esther Waters had been produced in 1964, although it is now lost.

== Main cast ==
- Gabrielle Lloyd as Esther Waters
- James Laurenson as William Latch
- Alison Steadman as Sarah
- Paul Jesson as Porter
- Jill Balcon as Mrs. Barfield
- David Burke as Fred Parsons
- Ellis Dale as Mr. Randal

== Bibliography ==
- Baskin, Ellen . Serials on British Television, 1950-1994. Scolar Press, 1996.
