= Thieves' Highway =

1949 American film noir

- Theatrical release poster
- Directed by: Jules Dassin
- Screenplay by: A. I. Bezzerides
- Based on: Thieves' Market; 1949 novel by A. I. Bezzerides
- Produced by: Robert Bassler
- Starring: Richard Conte; Valentina Cortese; Lee J. Cobb; Barbara Lawrence
- Cinematography: Norbert Brodine
- Edited by: Nick DeMaggio
- Music by: Alfred Newman
- Production company: 20th Century Fox
- Distributed by: 20th Century Fox
- Release date: October 10, 1949 (United States)
- Running time: 94 minutes
- Country: United States
- Language: English
- Box office: $1.5 million (US rentals)

Thieves' Highway is a 1949 American film noir directed by Jules Dassin and starring Richard Conte, Valentina Cortese and Lee J. Cobb. The screenplay was written by A. I. Bezzerides, based on his novel Thieves' Market. The film was released on DVD as part of the Criterion Collection in 2005.

== Plot ==
Nico "Nick" Garcos is a veteran of World War II, who arrives, from Asia, at his family home in Fresno, California to find that his foreign-born father, who became a produce truck driver, has lost his legs and was forced to sell his truck. He learns that his father was crippled at the hands of an unscrupulous produce dealer in San Francisco, called Mike Figlia. Garcos vows revenge for his father.

Garcos goes into business with Ed Kinney, who bought the Garcos truck, and they each drive a truckload of apples to San Francisco. Garcos arrives ahead of Kinney and meets Figlia, after parking his truck in a manner that blocks Figlia's busy wholesale stand. Subsequently, the produce dealer's thugs sabotage the truck by cutting a tire.

Figlia hires a streetwalker, Rica, to seduce and preoccupy Garcos in her room while his men unload the apples without permission. Garcos makes Figlia pay for the fruit, but that night goons waylay and rob Garcos of the cash.

Meanwhile, Kinney's truck, full of apples, has been struggling on the drive to San Francisco and the drive shaft universal joint breaks as he is driving downhill, preventing downshifting (engine braking). The brakes also seem to fail. In a horrific crash Kinney initially survives but the truck bursts into flames and he is burned alive, to the horror of several onlookers. Polly, Garcos' hometown sweetheart, then arrives in the city ready to marry him, but leaves disillusioned after she finds him recovering from his beating in Rica's apartment and with no money. Garcos and a trucker, who witnessed and brings news of Kinney's death, finally confront the cowed bully Figlia at a tavern. Garcos beats him, and Figlia is arrested, restoring the Garcos family honor. Garcos and Rica happily drive off and plan to get married.

== Cast ==
- Richard Conte as Nico "Nick" Garcos
- Valentina Cortese as Rica
- Lee J. Cobb as Mike Figlia
- Barbara Lawrence as Polly Faber
- Jack Oakie as Slob
- Millard Mitchell as Ed Kinney
- Joseph Pevney as Pete
- Morris Carnovsky as Yanko Garcos
- Tamara Shayne as Parthena Garcos
- Kasia Orzazewski as Mrs. Polansky
- Norbert Schiller as Mr. Polansky
- Hope Emerson as Midge, a buyer
- Jules Dassin as a fruit salesman on a freight elevator (uncredited)

== Production ==
Dana Andrews and Victor Mature originally were announced for the lead.

The film was shot in 30 days.

Some of the film was shot on location in San Francisco, and is noted for its accurate depiction of the vibrant fruit and produce market in that city, then located adjacent to the Embarcadero north of the Ferry Building. The Figlia Market is depicted on the corner of Washington and Davis Streets (clearly indicated by a street sign). The produce market was closed and moved to the southeastern part of the city by the end of the 1950s. The warehouses were demolished to make way for the Alcoa Building (now known as One Maritime Plaza), and the Golden Gateway residential and commercial development. The Hotel Colchester where Rica resides was located at 259 Embarcadero (now a parking lot). Also depicted is the old State Belt Line Railroad which provided service to the piers and warehouses of the entire Embarcadero.

Some of the outdoor produce market scenes were shot at the Oakland Produce Market, near today's Jack London Square.

== Reception ==
When the film was released, New York Times film critic Bosley Crowther said, as a part of a larger review:

But particular thanks for this crisp picture should go to the Messrs. Bezzerides and Dassin for their keen writing, well-machined construction and sharpness of imagery. Once again, Mr. Dassin, who directed The Naked City, has gone forth into actual settings for his backgrounds — onto the highways and the city streets, the orchards and teeming produce markets of California and San Francisco. He has got the look and "feel" of people and places in the produce world. You can almost sense the strain of trucking and smell the crated fruit. More than that, he has got the excitement and the tension of commerce today. Thieves' Highway is a first-class melodrama which just misses — yes, just misses — being great.

Thieves' Highway is considered an example of film gris, according to the classification of Thom Andersen.

Eddie Muller listed it as one of his Top 25 Noir Films.

== See also ==
- Hollywood blacklist
- Pulp noir
- Modernist film
