= Blake Butler =

English actor (1924–1981)

- Blake Butler (right) with Rosemary Martin in second episode of Last of the Summer Wine (1973)
- Born: John David Blake Butler; 22 October 1924; Barrow-in-Furness, Lancashire, England
- Died: 15 April 1981 (aged 56); Bedford Park, London, England
- Years active: 1960–1981

John David Blake Butler (22 October 1924 – 15 April 1981) was an English actor best known for his role as the lecherous chief librarian Mr. Wainwright during the first and third series of Last of the Summer Wine in 1973 and 1976 respectively.

== Background ==
Butler was the second son of FitzWalter Butler (1889–1979), of Grantham, Lincolnshire, and Doris Emma (d. 1950), daughter of Robert Pollok, of Cavendish Park, Barrow-in-Furness. The Butler family were Irish landed gentry; Blake Butler's line, prominent in County Clare, descended from James Butler, 10th Baron Dunboyne.

== Career ==
In addition to his work on Last of the Summer Wine, Butler made guest appearances on such programmes as Dad's Army, Doctor at Large, Bless This House, The Good Life, Paul Temple, George and Mildred, Grange Hill and, in 1967, Crossroads playing assistant manager Maurice Raine.

== Filmography ==
Year	Title	Role	Notes
1961	Rob Roy	Owen	5 episodes
1964	Esther Waters	Mr. Ward	3 episodes
1966	Death Is a Woman	Lift Operator	film
1967	The Mini-Affair	Customer	film
1969	Lock Up Your Daughters	Faithful	film
1972	Turnbull's Finest Half-Hour	Bernard Pratt	5 episodes
1973–1976	Last of the Summer Wine	Mr. Wainwright (the librarian)	5 episodes
1978	Grange Hill	Mr. Rankin (the Biology teacher)	Episode: #1.5
1978	A Sharp Intake of Breath	Hotel Guest	Episode: "Seven Year Hitch"
1978	Rumpole of the Bailey	Mr. Thistleton	Episode: "Rumpole and the Heavy Brigade"

== Personal life ==
Butler lived at 33, Bath Road, Bedford Park, London, when he died on 15 April 1981 at age 56.

== Sources ==
- Bright, Morris; Robert Ross (2000). Last of the Summer Wine: The Finest Vintage. London: BBC Worldwide Ltd. ISBN 0-563-55151-8.
