= Kathleen Ryan =

Irish actress (1922–1985)

- Ryan in Odd Man Out (1947)
- Born: 8 September 1920; Dublin, Ireland
- Died: 11 December 1985 (aged 65); Dublin, Ireland
- Spouse: Dermod Devane (m. 1944; annul. 1958)
- Children: 3

Kathleen Ryan (8 September 1920 – 11 December 1985) was an Irish actress.

She was born in Dublin, Ireland of Tipperary parentage and appeared in British and Hollywood films between 1947 and 1957. In 2020, she was listed as number 40 on The Irish Times's list of Ireland's greatest film actors.

== Family ==
Ryan's father died in 1933, shortly after he had been elected to Ireland's senate. Her brother was John Ryan, an artist and man of letters in bohemian Dublin of the 1940s and 1950s, who was a friend and benefactor of a number of struggling writers in the post-war era, such as Patrick Kavanagh. He started and edited a short-lived literary magazine entitled Envoy. Among her other siblings were Fr. Vincent (Séamus), a Benedictine priest at Glenstal Abbey, Sister Íde of the Convent of The Sacred Heart, Mount Anville, Dublin, Oonagh (who married the Irish artist Patrick Swift), Cora who married the politician, Seán Dunne, T.D.

Ryan's schooling came in convents and universities. She married Dermod Devane in the society wedding of 1944 and the couple had three children, but the marriage was annulled in 1958.

== Career ==
Ryan acted with the Dublin Abbey Players and at Longford's Gate Theater. She was discovered by Carol Reed, and her film debut was in a leading role in Odd Man Out (1947). Arthur Rank, to whom she was under contract, turned down subsequent offers for her to act in films, but she resumed film work after that contract expired. Her other films included Captain Boycott (1947) and the American film gris The Sound of Fury (1950), directed by Cy Endfield. She also appeared in the English-made Christopher Columbus (1949), but censors removed her from the version shown in the United States. Her role involved "a romantic interlude in Columbus's life," she said, "and that did not meet with approval in America because of prevailing traditions regarding the discoverer of this continent."

== Painting ==
Ryan was the subject of one of Louis le Brocquy's most striking portraits, Girl in White, which he painted in 1941 and entered in the RHA exhibition of that year. The portrait (oil on canvas) is in the Ulster Museum collection.

== Death ==
Ryan died in Dublin in December 1985 from a lung ailment at the age of 63. She was buried with her parents beneath a statue of the Blessed Virgin Mary, near the Republican Plot in Glasnevin Cemetery, Dublin.

== Filmography ==
- Odd Man Out (1947)
- Captain Boycott (1947)
- Esther Waters (1948)
- Give Us This Day (1949)
- Christopher Columbus (1949)
- Prelude to Fame (1950)
- The Sound of Fury (1950)
- The Yellow Balloon (1953)
- Laxdale Hall (1953)
- Captain Lightfoot (1955)
- Jacqueline (1956)
- Sail Into Danger (aka El Aventurero) (1957)
