= David Burke (British actor) =

British actor (1934–2026)

- Burke as Dr. Watson in The Adventures of Sherlock Holmes 1985
- Born: David Patrick George Burke; 25 May 1934; Liverpool, Lancashire, England
- Died: 10 May 2026 (aged 91)
- Occupation: Actor
- Years active: 1963–2018
- Spouse: Anna Calder-Marshall
- Children: Tom Burke

David Patrick George Burke (25 May 1934 – 10 May 2026) was a British actor, known for playing Dr. John Watson in the initial series of Granada Television's 1980s The Adventures of Sherlock Holmes (1984–1986), which starred Jeremy Brett in the title role. He also appeared as Joseph Stalin in the last two episodes of Reilly, Ace of Spies (1983).

Other credits included Coronation Street (1963–1966), ITV Play of the Week (1963, 1967), Z Cars (1963–1969), Dixon of Dock Green (1965–1968), The Woodlanders (1970), The Guardians (1971), Play for Today (1971–1979), The Love School (1975), Rooms (1975), Crown Court (1975–1979), Esther Waters (1977), BBC Television Shakespeare (1981–1983), Nanny (1982–1983), The House of Eliott (1994), Bertie and Elizabeth (2002), Waking the Dead (2002), A Ghost Story for Christmas (2005–2006), The Woman in Black (2012), Heartbeat (2016), and The Young Messiah (2016).

== Early life and education ==
David Patrick George Burke was born in Liverpool, England, on 25 May 1934, and trained at the Royal Academy of Dramatic Art.

== Career ==
In the theatre, Burke originated the part of Niels Bohr in Michael Frayn's Copenhagen (1998). With Frayn, he wrote Celia's Secret: An Investigation (US title The Copenhagen Papers), (2000).

Burke played Dr. Watson in The Adventures of Sherlock Holmes for the initial series and then left the programme after receiving an invitation to join the Royal Shakespeare Company along with his wife, Anna. They both considered the joint work to be the best idea for their young son, Tom, who was around 3 years old at the time. He was thought by many to portray Dr. Watson with an excellent style. He was replaced by Edward Hardwicke, whom he had recommended as his successor. Burke had earlier experience with Holmes starring Douglas Wilmer and Nigel Stock, playing the villain in an adaptation of "The Adventure of the Beryl Coronet" for the 1965 BBC series.

Other notable television appearances included his turn as Joseph Stalin in the British serial Reilly, Ace of Spies, and an adaptation of the John Wyndham science fiction story Random Quest. He also played William Morris in the 1975 series The Love School. Burke frequently portrayed Johannes Coenradus Klene in the Dutch commercials for Klene liquorice. He was also in the "Midsomer Rhapsody" episode of Midsomer Murders in 2005. He appeared with his son, Tom Burke, in the 2006 BBC adaptation of the M.R. James ghost story, Number 13. He appeared with his wife, Anna Calder-Marshall, in the 2018 short film Only the Lonely.

== Personal life and death ==
Burke married Anna Calder-Marshall. Their son, Tom, is also an actor.

Burke died on 10 May 2026, aged 91. I Hear of Sherlock Everywhere posted a comprehensive tribute to Burke and listened to clips and discussed his legacy with The Jeremy Brett Sherlock Holmes Podcast team in the hours that followed.

== Filmography ==
=== Film ===
Year	Title	Role	Notes
1964	Rattle of a Simple Man	Jack	Uncredited
2005	The Trial of the King Killers	Hugh Peters	
2009	The Summer House	Freddie	Short
2010	Love & Distrust	Freddie	Video
2012	The Woman in Black	PC Collins	
2016	The Young Messiah	The Blind Rabbi	
2018	Only the Lonely	George	Short

=== Television ===
Year	Title	Role	Notes
1963	The Avengers	John James Wrightson	Episode: "Death of a Batman"
1963	The Sentimental Agent	Civic Guard	Episode: "May the Saints Preserve Us"
1963–1966	Coronation Street	John Benjamin / Schoolmaster	5 episodes
1963–1967	ITV Play of the Week	Major Digby/Ken Wickes	2 episodes
1963–1969	Z Cars	Ernie Franks / Dannyboy / Johnny Oulton	5 episodes
1965	Sherlock Holmes	Sir George Burnwell	Episode: "The Beryl Coronet"
1965–1966	Redcap	Private Burroughs/Corproral Bond	2 episodes
1965–1968	Dixon of Dock Green	Various	3 episodes
1966	Softly, Softly	Swaine	Episode: "Best Out of Three"
1966	The Baron	Whetlor	Episode: "You Can't Win Them All"
1967	Inheritance	Henry Morcar	5 Episodes
1968	Dr. Finlay's Casebook	Dr. Rawlings	Episode: "'Is Anybod There?' Said the Traveller"
1968	The Champions	Roger Carson	Episode: "The Fanatics"
1969	The Wednesday Play	Len	Episode: "There is Also Tomorrow"
1970	The Woodlanders	Giles Winterborne	4 episodes
1971	ITV Sunday Night Theatre	Dan	Episode: "The Hotel in Amsterdam"
1971	Hine	George Dyson MP	Episode: "The Old School Noose"
1971	The Guardians	Dr. Frank Benedict	8 episodes
1971–1979	Play for Today	Various	3 episodes
1972	Villains	Eric	Episode: "Billy Boy
1973	Barlow at Large	Bill Walker	Episode: "Informant"
1975	The Love School	William Morris	4 episodes
1975	Rooms	Alan	2 episodes
1975–1979	Crown Court	Dr Boyd	4 serials
1977	Esther Waters	Fred Parsons	2 episodes
1978	Armchair Thriller	Tom Amyas MP	Serial: "Quiet as a Nun"
1981–1983	BBC Television Shakespeare	William Catesby (Richard III); Camillo (The Winter's Tale); Gloucester/Dick (Henry VI 1 & 2)	1983
1982–1983	Nanny	Sam Tavener	5 episodes
1983	Reilly, Ace of Spies	Joseph Stalin	2 episodes
1984–1985	The Adventures of Sherlock Holmes	Dr John Watson	13 episodes
1988	Screen Two	Gareth	Episode: "Run for the Lifeboat"
1993–2002	Casualty	James / Ron Fisher	2 episodes
1994	In Suspicious Circumstances	James Maybrick	Segment: "Poisoned Whispers"
1994	The House of Eliott	Sir John Coworough	2 episodes
1994	Shakespeare: The Animated Tales	Narrator	Episode: As You Like It
1994	Space Precinct	Vachel	Episode: "Seek and Destroy"
1995	Agatha Christie’s Poirot	Sir Arthur Stanley	Episode: "Hickory Dickory Dock"
1996	Testament: The Bible in Animation	God	Episode: "Creation and the Flood"
1998	Performance	Kent	Episode: King Lear
1998	The Bill	Ch.Supt.Golding / Chief Supt. Golding	2 episodes
2002	Animated Tales of the World	Goat-Kneed Commander	Episode: "The Sheppardess and the Chimney Sweep: A Story from Denmark"
2002	Bertie and Elizabeth	Lord Reith	TV movie
2002	Waking the Dead	Philip Bryant	2 episodes
2003	Doctors	Martin Shepley	Episode: "The Long and Winding Road"
2004	The Inspector Lynley Mysteries	DSI Webberley	2 episodes
2005	The Afternoon Play	Judge	Episode: The Trouble With George"
2005	A View from a Hill	Patten	TV movie
2005	Dalziel and Pascoe	Paul Boddison	2 episodes
2005	Spooks	Fiona's Father	Episode: "The Russian"
2005–2006	A Ghost Story for Christmas	Pattene/Gunton	2 episodes
2005–2016	Midsomer Murders	John “Hedge” Farrow / Fred Messenger	2 episodes
2006	Number 13	Gunton, Hotel Landlord	TV movie
2007	Holby City	Bernie Moore	Episode: "The Reckoning"
2014	The Musketeers	Father Duval	Episode: "The Exiles"
2015	Harry Price: Ghost Hunter	Leonard Thornton	TV movie
2016	Heartbeat	Dr. David	2 episodes
