= Captain Boycott (film) =

1947 historical drama film by Frank Launder

- Directed by: Frank Launder
- Written by: Wolfgang Wilhelm; Philip Rooney
- Starring: Stewart Granger; Kathleen Ryan; Cecil Parker
- Music by: William Alwyn
- Production company: Individual Pictures
- Distributed by: General Film Distributors
- Release date: 26 August 1947
- Running time: 92 mins
- Country: United Kingdom
- Language: English
- Budget: £250,000 (US$1 million)

Captain Boycott is a 1947 British historical drama film directed by Frank Launder and starring Stewart Granger, Kathleen Ryan, Mervyn Johns, Alastair Sim and Cecil Parker. Robert Donat makes a cameo appearance as the Irish nationalist leader Charles Stewart Parnell. The film explains how the word boycott appeared in the English language. The titular character plays a secondary role in the film, as an anti-hero, and the hero of the film is Hugh Davin.

== Plot ==
In 1880 in County Mayo, during the period of Irish history known as the Land War, Irish tenant farmers agitated for reinstatement of their former lower rents and increased tenants' rights, especially from absentee English landlords. They particularly resented evictions. Some resorted to the gun to achieve justice, but others, inspired by the Irish statesman Charles Stewart Parnell, shunned violence and adopted a form of passive resistance.

Parnell advocates the theory that potential new tenants should never bid for farms from which the old or current tenant has been evicted: this is the core of the "boycott" concept. The crowd, containing Davin and his friends, who had thought that Parnell was going to speak in favour of eviction, put their rotten eggs away and are instead impressed.

The farmers are led by Hugh Davin who, with the moral support of the local priest, Father McKeogh, encourages his fellow tenants to ostracize their land agent, the bombastic Captain Boycott. There is a love interest in the form of Ann Killain, whose father is also shunned for taking up a farm from which another farmer had been evicted. The resultant stand-off attracts international news coverage and will ultimately introduce a new word – to boycott – to the English language.

Actions begin with Boycott's servants abandoning his house. One final servant, Bridget, is caught as last to leave. She tells him Davin asked them to leave. Everyone refuses to gather Boycott's crops. The situation persists and Boycott asks for the support of the British parliament. The story reaches every newspaper and becomes the subject of music hall jokes. The British press go to the Boycott estate, followed by a squad of troopers to support him.

Things start to get out of hand when the authorities, at the word of Boycott, demolish Davin's farm.

Captain Boycott risks his survival, having lost all other income, on his horse racing at the Curragh. The Captain acts as his own jockey on a horse bought from Davin. However, the crowd will not tolerate it, and despite the number of mounted troopers they block the Captain on his horse as he approaches the finishing line and mob him.

Michael Fagan steals Davin's revolver and tries to kill Killain, who has been signing the eviction notices. A fight ensues and Fagan falls in a river. It is reported that he has been murdered. Davin tries to stop the mob from lynching Killain because he loves his daughter.

Davin rushes to the Killain cottage and finds the priest giving the last rites to Killain, who has been shot by Fagan. When the mob arrive they are pointed to Boycott and the troops leaving: their cause lost. The priest says if anything like this happens again they will be able to "boycott" him.

== Cast ==
- Stewart Granger as Hugh Davin
- Kathleen Ryan as Anne Killain
- Cecil Parker as Capt. Charles Boycott
- Mervyn Johns as Watty Connell
- Alastair Sim as Father McKeogh the local priest
- Noel Purcell as Daniel McGinty
- Niall MacGinnis as Mark Killain
- Maureen Delany as Mrs. Davin
- Eddie Byrne as Sean Kerin
- Liam Gaffney as Michael Fagan
- Liam Redmond as Martin Egan
- Edward Lexy as Sgt. Dempsey
- Robert Donat as Charles Stewart Parnell
- Bernadette O'Farrell as Mrs. Fagan
- Harry Webster as Robert Hogan
- Reginald Purdell as reporter
- Cavan Malone as Billy Killain

== Production ==
During shooting of this film in 1946, Bernard Cardinal Griffin, the then Archbishop of Westminster, paid an official visit to the set, during which he met the film's two stars Kathleen Ryan and Stewart Granger. The event was filmed for newsreel.

== Reception ==
=== Box office ===
According to trade papers, the film was a "notable box office attraction" at British cinemas in 1947.

=== Critical ===
The Monthly Film Bulletin wrote: "The opening scenes of the film are jerky and confusing, but once it gets into its stride this exciting historical theme is well handled. Portrayal of Irish scenery and character is sensitive although Stewart Granger's Irish hero is somewhat heavy-handed. Cecil Parker is magnificent as Boycott. Robert Donat makes a short but effective appearance as Parnell."

Variety wrote: "This story of troubled Ireland in 1880 is off from the beaten track. From Philip Rooney's historical romance Frank Launder and Sidney Gilliat have fashioned a first-rate film, although some of the changes from the novel appear unnecessary. ... Since scant attention has been paid to history it is a pity that a litle more tension was not engendered between the estranged lovers. Granger has compensatory scenes, but Miss Ryan has been sadly neglected. Picture should give Granger a much-needed fillip and please his multitude of fans. Cecil Parker makes Captain Boycott a most credible and understandable figure, and Ireland's leading comic, Noel Purcell, misses nothing as a fire-eating schoolmaster agitator. Good actor as Alastair Sim is, he is still a Scot, and his humor is not that of the Irish parish priest."

In The New York Times Bosley Crowther wrote that "a generous assortment of rich and pungent Irish characters contributes not only to the action but to the spirit, humor and charm of the film ... with the added virtues of beautiful vistas across the Irish countryside Launder have given us a picture which should thrill, amuse – and counsel well."

Screenonline described Captain Boycott as "expertly constructed, wittily scripted, impeccably cast and enormously entertaining".

Film4 wrote: "Captain Boycott is in turns enlightening and inspiring, but ultimately its characters are a little too quaint and good to convince, or at least to make for successful drama, while the script remains curiously unfocused."
