= Sail Into Danger =

1957 British film by Kenneth Hume

- Spanish theatrical release poster
- Directed by: Kenneth Hume
- Written by: Kenneth Hume
- Produced by: Steven Pallos
- Starring: Dennis O'Keefe Kathleen Ryan James Hayter
- Cinematography: Phil Grindrod
- Edited by: Edward Jeffries
- Music by: Ivor Slaney
- Production company: Patria
- Release date: 1957
- Running time: 73 minutes
- Country: United Kingdom
- Language: English

Sail into Danger, also known as El Aventurero, is a 1957 British second feature film directed and written by Kenneth Hume and starring Dennis O'Keefe, Kathleen Ryan and James Hayter.

== Plot ==
Ex-smuggler Steve Ryman is a Barcelona motor launch operator, along with his friend Monty and Angel, a local boy. Steve is involved in a fight, and jailed. His bail is paid by a mysterious benefactor, and he meets Lena, who blackmails Steve into taking her and her gang to Tangier. The gang murder Angel, shoot Monty, knock out Steve and set him adrift in a boat. He recovers in time to save the boat, take Monty to hospital and pursue the gang to the mountains. He kills two of them, and the police arrive to arrest Lena.

== Cast ==
- Dennis O'Keefe as Steve Ryman
- Kathleen Ryan as Lena
- James Hayter as Monty
- Ana Luisa Peluffo as Josafina
- Pedro De Cordoba as Luis
- Barta Barry as Emil
- Felix De Pommes as Inspector Gomez
- Miguel Fleta as Manuel
- John Bull as Angel

== Critical reception ==
The Monthly Film Bulletin wrote: "An interesting script, with a sparkle of necrophilia about it, makes one regret that casting and direction were not more ambitious or enthusiastic. John Bull as Angel adds charm to an otherwise monotonous series of performances."

Kine Weekly said: "Dennis O'Keefe makes a rugged and determined Steve, Ana Luisa Peluffo displays considerable charm in the comparatively small role of Josafina, and John Bull is a likeable Angel. Kathleen Ryan hardly suggests the ruthless bad hat as Lena, but the rest measure up to demands. Its juvenile and love interests smoothly dovetail into its exciting main plot, and the final chase is spectacular."

Picture Show wrote: "Intriguing crime melodrama ... Well acted with a spectacular climax this film will thrill most audiences."
