= Film gris =

Film genre

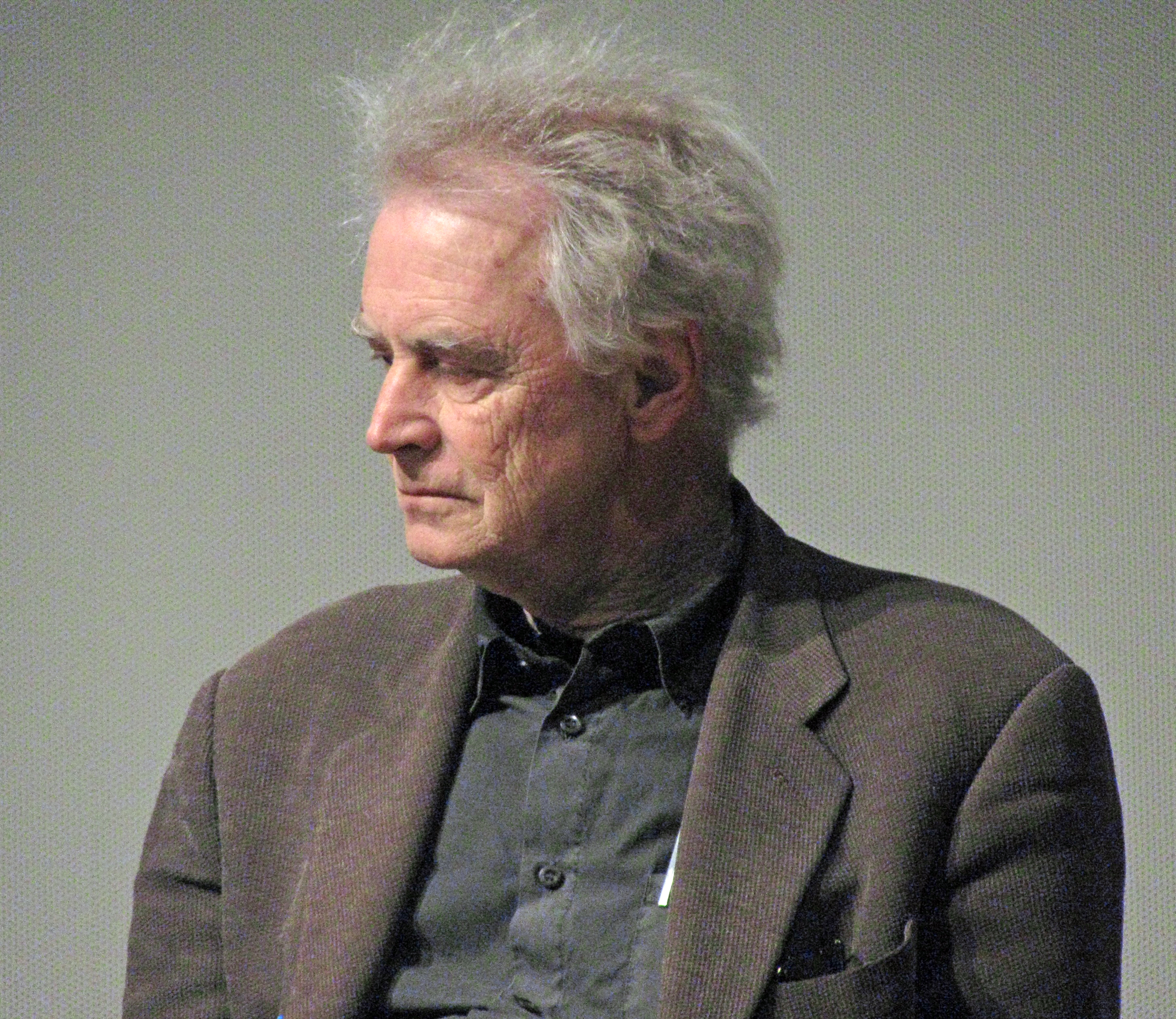
Thom Andersen in 2009

Film gris (French: [film ɡʁi]; French for "grey film"), a term coined by experimental filmmaker Thom Andersen, is a type of film noir which categorizes a unique series of films that were released between 1947 and 1951. They came in the context of the first wave of the communist investigations of the House Un-American Activities Committee, often made by associates, fellow travellers and supporters of the convicted Hollywood Ten.

== Thematic elements ==
Films gris offer a leftist criticism of society in general, and of capitalism in particular. They typically examine such themes as the psychological damages of class, the false promises of middle class happiness, and the pitfalls of materialism. The politically-active John Garfield was frequently cast by producing partner Bob Roberts as the leading actor in this sub-genre.

== Distinction from film noir ==
Film gris differs from film noir in some of the following ways:

- Film gris is more pessimistic and cynical than film noir. The dividing line between crime and law enforcement is often blurred.
- Films gris tend to blame society for crime, rather than the individual.
- Audience identification is often with the collective in a way atypical of Hollywood films.
- The femme fatale’s motives are more obvious and easier to identify than in film noir.

== List of films gris ==
Andersen identifies the following as films gris:

- 1947
  - Body and Soul
- 1948
  - Force of Evil
  - They Live by Night
- 1949
  - Thieves' Highway
  - Knock on Any Door
  - We Were Strangers
- 1950
  - The Asphalt Jungle
  - The Breaking Point
  - The Lawless
  - Night and the City
  - Try and Get Me! (The Sound of Fury)
- 1951
  - The Prowler
  - He Ran All the Way

== List of film gris directors ==
- Jules Dassin
- Abraham Polonsky
- Nicholas Ray
- John Huston
- Joseph Losey
- John Berry
- Cy Endfield

== See also ==
- Neo-noir
- Message picture
- United States in the 1950s

== Sources ==
- Andersen, Thom. "Red Hollywood." Literature and the Visual Arts in Contemporary Society. Eds. Suzanne Ferguson and Barbara S. Groseclose. Columbus: Ohio State University Press. (1985).
- Hirsch, Joshua. "Film Gris Reconsidered." The Journal of Popular Film and Television 34.2. (2006).
- Maland, Charles. "Film Gris: Crime, Critique, and Cold War Culture in 1951." Film Criticism 26.3. (2002).
