= Esther Waters =

1894 novel by George Moore

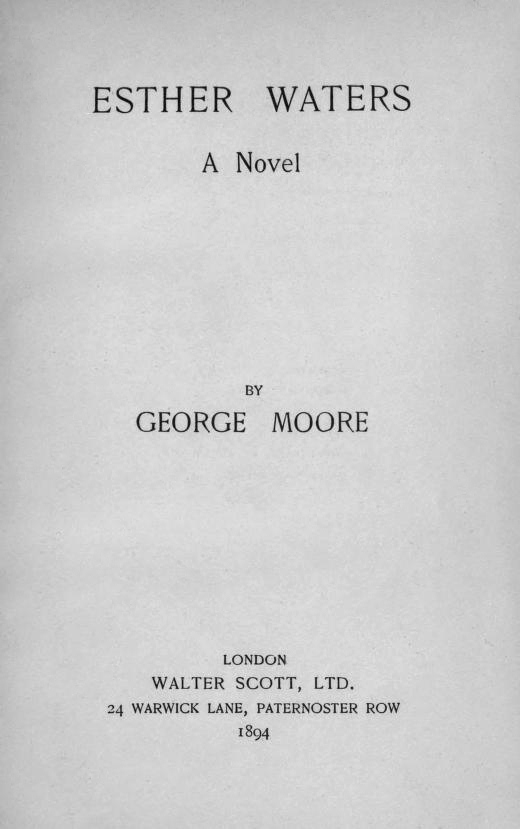
First edition title page.

Esther Waters is a novel by George Moore first published in 1894.

== Overview ==
Set in England from the early 1870s onward, the novel is about a pious young woman from a poor working-class family who, while working as a kitchen maid, is seduced by another employee, becomes pregnant, is deserted by her lover, and against all odds decides to raise her child as a single mother. Esther Waters is one of a group of Victorian novels that depict the life of a "fallen woman".

Written in a naturalistic style similar to that of Émile Zola, the novel stands out among Moore's publications as the book whose immediate success, including William Ewart Gladstone's approval of the novel in the Westminster Gazette, brought him financial security. Continuously revised by Moore (1899, 1917, 1920, 1931), it is often regarded as his best novel.

Esther Waters is dedicated to T. W. Rolleston.

== Plot summary ==
Esther Waters is born to hard-working parents who are Plymouth Brethren in Barnstaple, Devon. Her father's premature death prompts her mother to move to London and marry again, but Esther's stepfather turns out to be a hard-drinking bully and wife-beater who forces Esther, a natural beauty, to leave school and go out to work instead, thus greatly reducing her chances of ever learning how to read and write, and Esther remains illiterate all her life.

Her first job outside London is that of a kitchen maid with the Barfields, a nouveau riche family of horse breeders, horse racers and horse betters who live at Woodview near Shoreham. There she meets William Latch, a footman, and is seduced by him. Dreaming of a future with Latch, she is dismayed to find that he is having an affair with the Barfields' niece, who is staying at Woodview. After Latch and his lover have eloped together, Esther stays on at Woodview until she cannot hide her pregnancy any longer. Although she has found a kindred soul in Mrs Barfield, who is also a Plymouth Sister and abhors the betting on horses going on all around her, Esther is dismissed ("I couldn't have kept you on, on account of the bad example to the younger servants") and reluctantly goes back to London.

With the little money she has saved, she can stay in a rented room out of her stepfather's sight. Her mother is pregnant with her eighth child and dies giving birth to it at the same time Esther is at Queen Charlotte's Hospital giving birth to a healthy boy she calls Jackie. Still in confinement, she is visited by her younger sister who asks her for money for her passage to Australia, where her whole family have decided to emigrate. Esther never hears of them again.

Learning that a young mother in her situation can make good money by becoming a wet nurse, Esther leaves her newborn son in the care of a baby farmer and nurses the sickly child of a wealthy woman ("Rich folk don't suckle their own") who, out of fear of infection, forbids Esther any contact with Jack. When, after two long weeks, she finally sees her son again, realises that he is anything but prospering and even believes that his life might be in danger, she immediately takes him with her, terminates her employment without notice and then sees no other way than to "accept the shelter of the workhouse" for herself and Jack.

But Esther is lucky, and after only a few months can leave the workhouse again. She chances upon Mrs Lewis, a lonely widow living in East Dulwich who is both willing and able to raise her boy in her stead, while she herself goes into service again. However, she is not able to really settle down anywhere: either the work is so hard and the hours so long that, fearing for her health, she quits again; or she is dismissed when her employers find out about the existence of her illegitimate son, concluding that she is a "loose" woman who must not work in a respectable household. Later on, while hiding her son's existence, she is fired when the son of the house, in his youthful fervour, makes passes at her and eventually writes her a love letter she cannot read.

Another stroke of luck in her otherwise dreary life is her employment as general servant in West Kensington with Miss Rice, a novelist who is very sympathetic to her problems. While working there, she makes the acquaintance of Fred Parsons, a Plymouth Brother and political agitator, who proposes to Esther at about the same time she bumps into William Latch again while on an errand for her mistress. Latch, who has amassed a small fortune betting on horses and as a bookmaker, is the proprietor of a public house in Soho and has separated from his adulterous wife, waiting for his divorce to be completed. He immediately declares his unceasing love for Esther and urges her to live with him and work behind the bar of his pub. Esther realises that she must make up her mind between the sheltered, serene and religious life Parsons is offering her—which she is really longing for—and sharing the financially secure but turbulent existence of a successful small-time entrepreneur who, as she soon finds out, operates on both sides of the law. Eventually, for the sake of her son's future, she decides to go to Soho with Latch, and after his divorce has come through the couple get married.

A number of years of relative happiness follow. Jack, now in his teens, can be sent off to school, and Esther even has her own servant. But Latch is a gambler, and nothing can stop him from risking most of the money he has in the hope of gaining even more. Illegal betting is conducted in an upstairs private bar, but more and more also across the counter, until the police clamp down on his activities, his licence is revoked, and he has to pay a heavy fine. This coincides with Latch developing a chronic, sometimes bloody, cough, contracting pneumonia, and finally, in his mid-thirties, being diagnosed with tuberculosis ("consumption"). However, rather than not touching what little money he still has for his wife and son's sake, the dying man puts everything on one horse, loses, and dies a few days later.

With Miss Rice also dead, Esther has no place to turn to and again takes on any menial work she can get hold of. Then she remembers Mrs Barfield, contacts her and, when asked to come to Woodview as her servant, gladly accepts while Jack, now old enough to earn his own living, stays behind in London. When she arrives there, Esther finds the once proud estate in a state of absolute disrepair, with Mrs Barfield the only inhabitant. Mistress and maid develop an increasingly intimate relationship with each other and, for the first time in their lives, can practise their religion unhindered. Looking back on her "life of trouble and strife," Esther, now about 40, says she has been able to fulfil her task—to see her boy "settled in life," and thus does not see any reason whatsoever to want to get married again. In the final scene of the novel, Jack, who has become a soldier, visits the two women at Woodview.

== Critical reception ==
Moore's fellow late nineteenth-century novelist George Gissing wrote there was "some pathos and power in latter part, but miserable writing. The dialogue often grotesquely phrased".

In a 1936 review of a series of books published by The Bodley Head and Penguin Books, appearing in The New English Weekly, George Orwell described Esther Waters as "far and away the best" of the 10 books in the series. Describing the novel as Moore's best and comparing it to W. Somerset Maugham's Of Human Bondage, Orwell noted certain stylistic flaws but argued its "fundamental sincerity makes its surface faults almost negligible."

== Stage and film adaptations ==
The reason why Moore chose Esther Waters rather than one of his lesser known novels (which he might have been able to promote that way) to be adapted for the stage may have been its "Englishness". The subject-matter of Esther Waters was the most "English" of his novels, and Moore had just returned to England after abandoning his brief interest in the Irish Renaissance theatre movement. 1911, then, saw the première, at the Apollo Theatre in London's West End, of Esther Waters: a play in five acts, which Moore had adapted from his own novel. Although it did not receive good reviews, Moore was pleased with the production. In 1913 Heinemann published the playscript.

There are, however, two more versions of the play. One was the result of an unsuccessful collaboration, in 1922, between Moore and theatre critic Barrett H. Clark; a third version of the play was written by Clark in the same year, but never performed. The two 1922 versions were first published in 1984.

Esther Waters was filmed in 1948 by Ian Dalrymple and Peter Proud with Kathleen Ryan (in the title role), Dirk Bogarde (as William Latch), Cyril Cusack, Ivor Barnard and Fay Compton. It was partly filmed at Folkington Manor, East Sussex. Two television dramas (miniseries) were produced in 1964 and 1977 respectively.

In 1964 the BBC produced a four-part miniseries of Esther Waters, with Meg Wynn Owen in the title role. A further television adaptation Esther Waters aired on the BBC in 1977, featuring Gabrielle Lloyd as Waters.

== See also ==
- Women in the Victorian era
- New Woman
- The Millstone (1965), a novel by Margaret Drabble in which unmarried young academic becomes pregnant after a one-night stand in early 1960s London and decides to give birth to her child and raise it herself
- Tales from the Vienna Woods (1931), a play by Ödön von Horváth in which a naive young woman must pay bitterly when she breaks off her reluctant engagement with a butcher after falling in love with a fop who, however, has no serious interest in returning her love
- Therese (1928), a novel by Arthur Schnitzler in which woman toils to provide for her illegitimate son, who in the end turns against her
