= What Do Those Old Films Mean? =

1985 six-part documentary miniseries

- Directed by: Noël Burch
- Starring: Mary Pickford; Douglas Fairbanks
- Countries of origin: United Kingdom; France
- Original language: English

Original release
- Release: 18 July – 29 August 1986

What Do Those Old Films Mean? (also known as The Silent Revolution) is a 1985 six-part documentary miniseries directed by noted film theorist Noël Burch.

== Summary ==
Each episode focuses on the history of silent film from Great Britain, Denmark, United States, France, Soviet Union and Germany in social context.

== Episodes ==
- "Along the Great Divide: Great Britain 1900-1912"
- "Tomorrow the World: USA 1902-1914"
- "She! Denmark 1902-1914"
- "The Enemy Below: France 1904-1912"
- "Born Yesterday: USSR 1926-1930"
- "Under Two Flags: Germany 1926-1932"

== See also ==
- Hollywood - 1980 miniseries also about silent cinema
- Film essay
- Classical Hollywood Cinema
