= Confessions of a Young Man =

Memoir by Irish writer George Moore

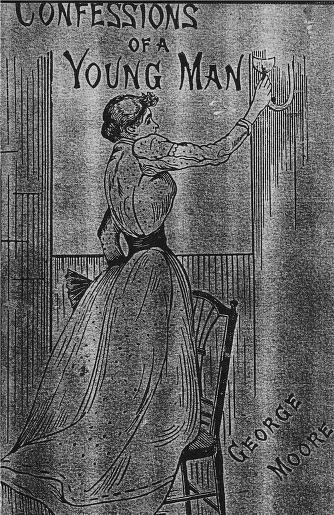
- Scanned cover of the English edition
- Author: George Moore
- Language: French
- Genre: Memoir
- Publication date: 1886

The Confessions of a Young Man (1886 in French; 1888 in English) is a memoir by Irish novelist George Moore who spent about 15 years in his teens and 20s in Paris and later London as a struggling artist. The book is notable as being one of the first English writings which named important emerging French Impressionists; for its literary criticism; and depictions of bohemian life in Paris during the 1870s and 1880s.

== Summary ==
In writing style The Confessions of a Young Man is presented as a novel, with a hero named Dayne, but the reader assumes in essence it is an autobiography, a true "confession". Dayne (i.e. Moore) went to Paris as a teenager, and almost becomes a full Parisian nearly forgetting the English language after 15 years. He sketches, with a frankness now jubilant, now cynical, the luscious "vie de Boheme" that Paris alone could offer the young man of health and wealth who loved art. Amid scenes splendid, squalid, or bizarre, move students, cabotins, painters, poets, pale enthusiasts starving for the sake of an idea, actresses, women of fashion, courtesans, clubmen, and spectators. Artistic endeavour and perfumed vice mingle in fraternity; everything is unusual, irregular, fantastic. Dayne emerges from the ordeal of this environment but little changed. For him the enticements of the flesh are not more powerful than those of art. One week he is beguiling the hours in some salon or alcove, the next he is incandescent with aspiration. So the years pass; and at last, having saturated himself with the French theories of literary and graphic art which are bound up with the names of Flaubert, Goncourts, Zola, Degas, and Manet, he one day learns with tragic certainty that he is not destined to be a painter, and he courageously admits that all this periodic, frenzied effort has been misdirected. Then we have interludes of philosophy and literary criticism; the philosophy perhaps not of much account; the criticism often original, epigrammatic, sometimes of an astounding penetration, and always literary. Later, Dayne is driven by adverse circumstances to London and to a lodging in the Strand, where the book ends. Dayne's ideas about art and his temperament can be seen in characteristic passages like the following: "For art was not for us then as it is now—a mere emotion, right or wrong only in proportion to its intensity; we believed then in the grammar of art, perspective, anatomy, and la jambe qui porte."

== Significance ==
Confessions of a Young Man was widely read for its energy and youthful outrage at hypocritical Victorian morality. The late nineteenth century English novelist George Gissing borrowed the book from the Grosvenor Library in April 1888 and described it as an "interesting but disgusting book". The Modern Library picked this book as one of its early re-prints in 1917. It is significant in part because Moore was one of the first to write about the emerging impressionist art scene in Paris. As Moore says in a later Preface: "The first eulogies written in England, I might also say in almost any language, of Manet, Degas, Whistler, Monet, Pissarro, are in this book of Confessions, and whoever reads will find himself unable to deny that time has vindicated them all splendidly." Finally, Moore wrote insightful literary criticism of major authors of the 19th century the general sentiment of which concurred with the following generation of Modernists in the early 20th century.
