= Los Angeles Plays Itself =

- Directed by: Thom Andersen
- Written by: Thom Andersen
- Starring: Encke King (narrator)
- Cinematography: Deborah Stratman
- Edited by: Seung-Hyun Yoo
- Release date: 2004
- Running time: 169 minutes
- Country: United States
- Language: English

Los Angeles Plays Itself is an American essay film by Thom Andersen, finished in 2003, exploring the way Los Angeles has been presented in movies.

== Synopsis ==
In the film, Andersen argues that the influence of Hollywood overshadows Los Angeles, and is one of the reasons the city's name is frequently abbreviated. He makes the case that directors have a distaste for modernist architecture, which is regularly used for villains' homes.

The documentary also explores the early history of Los Angeles in film, often as a stand in for other cities like Chicago that were bigger in the 1930s, as well as how cinema managed to capture long-gone immigrant enclaves that were razed to make room for downtown skyscrapers in the 1960s and 70s.

== Production and release ==
Andersen stated that the film idea occurred to him after a lecture he gave at the California Institute of the Arts, where he talked about his objections to L.A. Confidential, Curtis Hanson's 1997 Academy Award-winning neo-noir adapted from James Ellroy's novel about Los Angeles in the 1950s.

Consisting almost entirely of clips from other films with narration, the film was not initially released commercially as it was only seen in screenings presented by Andersen, occasional presentations at American Cinematheque and copies distributed via filesharing and other person-to-person methods. In 2014, it was announced that the film would finally be released officially by Cinema Guild.

== Reception and legacy ==
On Rotten Tomatoes, the film has an approval rating of 96% based on 45 reviews, with an average rating of 8.2/10. The site's critical consensus reads: "A treat for cinephiles, this documentary is a comprehensive, academic, and enlightening film essay concerning Los Angeles and its depiction in the movies." On Metacritic, the film has a weighted average score of 86 out of 100, based on 19 critics, indicating "universal acclaim".

Robert Koehler of Variety wrote: "Los Angeles may be the most photographed city in the world, but it has never have been captured with such complex layers of meaning and fascination as in Thom Andersen's remarkable Los Angeles Plays Itself." Frank Scheck of The Hollywood Reporter called it: "A terrific cinematic essay that will have a very, very long shelf life."

The film won the National Film Board Award for Best Documentary at the 2003 Vancouver International Film Festival, and was voted best documentary of 2004 by the Village Voice Critic's Poll.

Andersen's film has inspired a number of video essays that examine how places are represented in movies, including Vancouver Never Plays Itself, which appeared in Tony Zhou's pioneering Every Frame a Painting series, and Kansas Never Plays Itself, by travel author Rolf Potts, who uses The Wizard of Oz as a starting point to explore how his home state has been imagined, mythologized and distorted in cinema.
