= Thom Andersen =

American essay filmmaker and educator

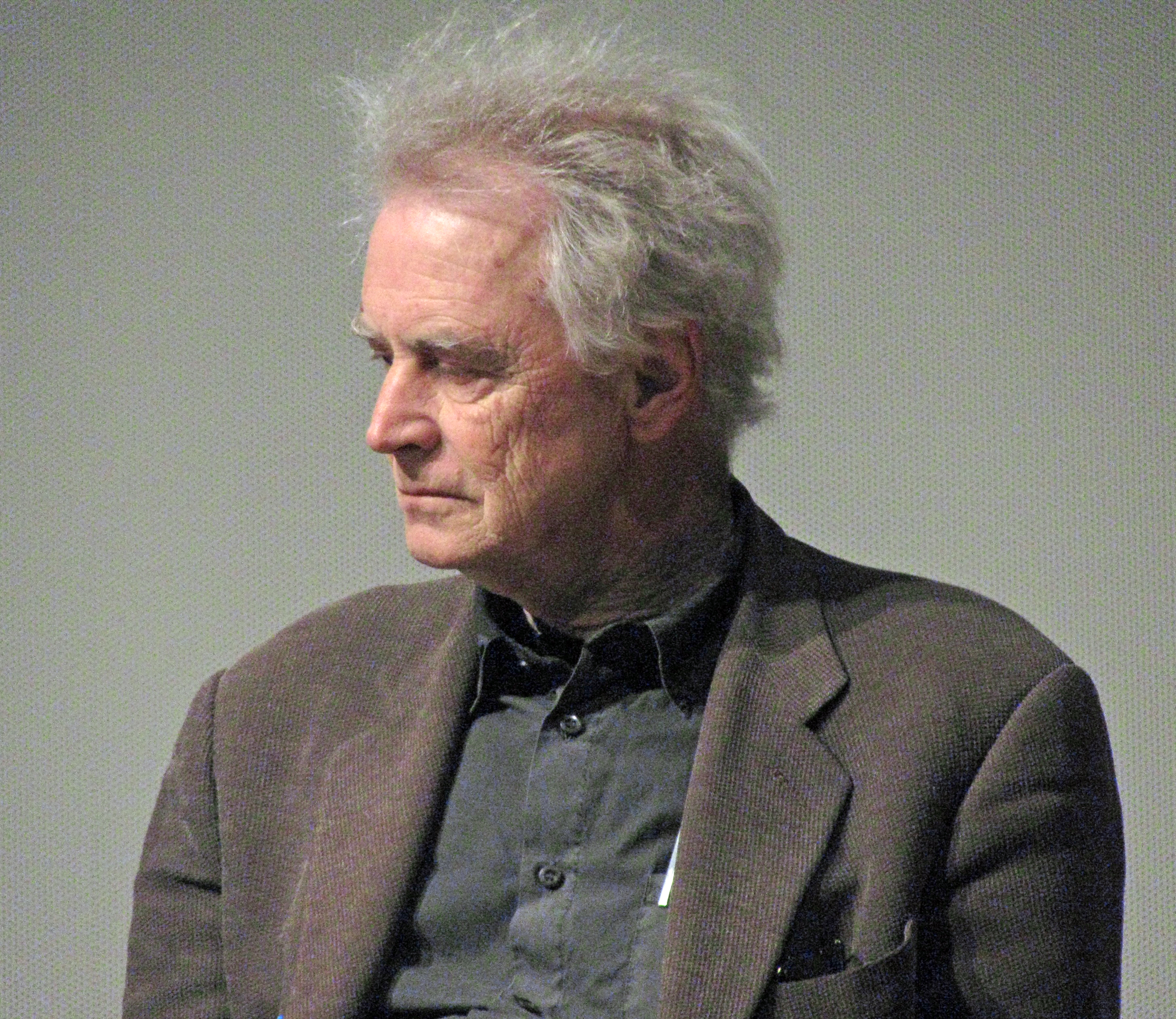
Thom Andersen, May 2009

Thom Andersen (born 1943, Chicago) is an American filmmaker, film critic, and teacher best known for his works of experimental film, including his 1975 film Eadweard Muybridge, Zoopraxographer and the 2003 essay film Los Angeles Plays Itself.

== Biography ==
In his youth, Anderson went to the same church as Ronald Reagan. He attended high school in Los Angeles, where one of his classmates was future CalArts colleague Michael Asher. Andersen attended the University of California, Berkeley in the early 1960s and then returned to his hometown of Los Angeles to attend USC School of Cinematic Arts, where he studied with Arthur Knight and eventually assisted on Knight's project The History of Sex in Cinema. While at USC, Andersen met long-time friend and collaborator Morgan Fisher, who assisted on Andersen's student film Melting, a portrait of a sundae. He regularly attended local screening series including shows by the Trak Film Group and Movies Round Midnight and famously wrote about an unpopular screening of Andy Warhol's Sleep. After USC, Andersen attended UCLA and completed his experimental documentaries Olivia's Place and Eadweard Muybridge, Zoopraxographer. During the 1970s, his films screened at Los Angeles' Theatre Vanguard and Berkeley's Pacific Film Archive. He was the programmer for LA Filmforum in Los Angeles during the late 1990s.

Andersen's film Los Angeles Plays Itself won the National Film Board Award for Best Documentary at the 2003 Vancouver International Film Festival, was voted best documentary of 2004 by the Village Voice critic's poll, and was voted one of the "Top Ten Films of the Decade" by critics at Cinema Scope. In 2010 he completed Get Out of the Car, a portrait of signs and abandoned spaces set to Los Angeles music. In spring 2012, Andersen took part in the three-month Whitney Biennial.

== Career ==
He has taught at the SUNY Buffalo and Ohio State University and had taught film theory and history at the California Institute of the Arts from 1987 until 2021. He lives in a two-bedroom modernist house designed by the architect Rudolf Schindler.

Andersen coined the term film gris, a type of film noir which categorizes a unique series of films that were released between 1947 and 1951.

== Preservation ==
The Academy Film Archive has preserved a number of Thom Andersen's films, including Olivia's Place, Melting, and --- ------- (aka The Rock n Roll Movie).

== Filmography ==
- Melting (1965)
- Olivia's Place (1966/74)
- --- ------- (1966–67) (aka The Rock n Roll Movie)
- Eadweard Muybridge, Zoopraxographer (1975) (National Film Registry inductee)
- Klassenverhältnisse directed by Straub-Huillet (1984) (actor)
- Red Hollywood (1996)
- Los Angeles Plays Itself (2003)
- Get Out of the Car (2010)
- Reconversion (2012)
- Juke: Passages from the Films of Spencer Willams (2015)
- The Thoughts That Once We Had (2015)

== See also ==
- Film essay
- Video essay
