= List of Dempsey and Makepeace episodes =

The following is a list of episodes from the British television series Dempsey and Makepeace. It ran for three series between 11 January 1985 and 1 November 1986. A total of 30 episodes were produced. The series was devised by Tony Wharmby who also produced the first two series. The third was produced by Ranald Graham. The series was produced by LWT in a joint venture with Golden Eagle films and originally transmitted in the UK on ITV.

== Series overview ==
Series	Episodes	Originally released	
Series	Episodes	First released	Last released
1	10	11 January 1985	22 March 1985
2	10	31 August 1985	2 November 1985
3	10	30 August 1986	1 November 1986

== Episodes ==
Regular cast: Michael Brandon as Lt. James Dempsey, Glynis Barber as Det. Sgt. Harriet Makepeace, Ray Smith as Chief Supt. Gordon Spikings, Tony Osoba as Det. Sgt. Chas Jarvis

=== Series 1 (1985) ===
Episode	Original Transmission	Title	Writer	Director	Editor	Guest stars
(ITV, 11 January to 22 March 1985)
1	11 January 1985	"Armed and Extremely Dangerous"	Ranald Graham	Tony Wharmby	Ray Helm	Ralph Michael, Ray Jewers, Terence Alexander, Mark Wing-Davey, Tony Jay, Margot Van der Burgh, Desmond Cullum-Jones
2	18 January 1985	"The Squeeze"	Jesse Carr-Martindale	Tony Wharmby	Derek Bain	Robert Blythe, Jonathan Stratt, Maureen Sweeney, James Beckett, Zig Byfield, John Moreno, JoAnne Good, Andy Bradford, Eddie Stacey, Roy Alon
3	25 January 1985	"Lucky Streak"	Dave Humphries	Tony Wharmby	Frank Webb	Christopher Strauli, Peter Cleall, Greg Powell, Trevor Ray
4	1 February 1985	"Given to Acts of Violence"	Jonathan Hales	William Brayne	Ray Helm	Ian Thompson, Brian Croucher, Ian McCulloch, Maureen O'Farrell, Angus MacKay, Neville Jason, Steve Emerson, Michael Cashman, Christopher Saul, Mike Mungarvan
5	8 February 1985	"Hors de Combat"	Jonathan Hales	Christian Marnham	Ray Weedon	Catriona MacColl, Derek Ware, Stephen Greif, Christopher Ellison, Godfrey James, Elaine Ives-Cameron, George Leech, Rocky Taylor, Chris Webb
6	15 February 1985	"Nowhere to Run"	Dave Humphries	Gerry Mill	Frank Webb	Michael Melia, Gary Shail, Tracy Hyde, Nick Stringer, Trevor Steedman, Bernard Padden
7	22 February 1985	"Makepeace, Not War"	Jesse Carr-Martindale	Tony Wharmby	Ray Helm	William Boyde, Brian Coburn, Zienia Merton, Ralph Michael, Vincent Wong, Arnold Lee, Paul Cooper
8	8 March 1985	"Blind Eye"	Jesse Carr-Martindale	Tony Wharmby	Ray Weedon	William Simons, Roger Booth, Desmond McNamara, Desmond Jordan, Roy Alon, Chris Webb, Peter Spraggon
9	15 March 1985	"Cry God for Harry"	Neil Rudyard	William Brayne	Ray Helm	Ralph Michael, John Terry, Seretta Wilson, Ralph Arliss, Christina Greatrex, Christopher Robbie, Brenda Kempner, Brian Hawksley
10	22 March 1985	"Judgement"	Jesse Carr-Martindale	William Brayne	Derek Bain	John Horsley, Sarah Sherborne, Tip Tipping, Iain Rattray, Brett Forrest

=== Series 2 (1985) ===
Episode	Original Transmission	Title	Writer	Director	Editor	Guest stars
(ITV, 31 August to 2 November 1985)
1	31 August 1985	"Silver Dollar"	Ranald Graham	Tony Wharmby	Ray Helm, Paul Hudson	George Harris, Ben Thomas, Colin McFarlane, Norman Hartley, Ken Barker, Howard Cooke
2	7 September 1985	"Wheelman"	Murray Smith	Tony Wharmby	Ray Helm, Paul Hudson	Tom Georgeson, George Irving, Lois Baxter, Tom Kelly, Valentino Musetti, Gareth Milne
3	14 September 1985	"Love You to Death"	Roger Marshall	Tony Wharmby	Ray Helm, Ray Weedon	Suzi Quatro, Elisabeth Sladen, Colin McFarlane
4	21 September 1985	"No Surrender"	Paul Wheeler	Viktors Ritelis	Ray Helm, Frank Webb	Jamie Foreman, Tony London, Christopher Bowen, Jerry Harte, Colin McFarlane, Trevor Steedman
5	28 September 1985	"Tequila Sunrise"	Ranald Graham	Tony Wharmby	Ray Helm, Ray Weedon	Lou Hirsch, Milton Johns, Edward Kelsey, Lloyd McGuire, Roy Evans, Angela Bruce, Johnny Dennis
6	5 October 1985	"Blood Money"	Dave Humphries	Graham Theakston	Ray Helm, Ray Weedon	Stefan Kalipha, Dudley Sutton, Derek Martin, Julian Fellowes, Roy Alon
7	12 October 1985	"Set a Thief"	Dave Humphries	Tony Wharmby	Ray Helm, Paul Hudson	Eric Deacon, Karl Howman, Tracey Childs, Malcolm Terris, Edward Peel, Mark Jones, Richard Mayes
8	19 October 1985	"The Hit"	Murray Smith	Tony Wharmby	Ray Helm, Frank Webb	Billy Murray, Patti Boulaye, Amanda Pays, Eamonn Walker, Arne Gordon, Mark Heath, Richard Ashley
9	26 October 1985	"In the Dark"	David Crane	Graham Theakston	Ray Helm, Ray Weedon	Benjamin Whitrow, Caroline Bliss, David Savile, Mary Jo Randle, Gareth Milne, Nick Hobbs
10	2 November 1985	"The Bogeyman"	Ranald Graham	Tony Wharmby	Ray Helm, Ray Weedon	Nick Brimble, Timothy Block, Clive Wood

=== Series 3 (1986) ===
Episode	Original Transmission	Title	Writer	Director	Editor	Guest stars
(ITV, 30 August to 1 November 1986)
1	30 August 1986	"The Burning" (Part One)	Ranald Graham	Baz Taylor	Ray Helm	Jill St. John, Michael J. Shannon, Bruce Boa, Andy Bradford, Nick Hobbs, Gareth Milne, Wayne Michaels, Anita Graham, Philip Anthony
2	6 September 1986	"The Burning" (Part Two)	Ranald Graham	Baz Taylor	Ray Helm	Jill St. John, Michael J. Shannon, Bruce Boa, William Ilkley, Andy Bradford, Nick Hobbs, Gareth Milne, Wayne Michaels
3	13 September 1986	"Jericho Scam"	Jeffrey Caine	Robert Tronson	Paul Hudson	Lee Montague, Jack Watson, Michael Robbins, Martyn Whitby
4	20 September 1986	"The Prizefighter"	Murray Smith	Baz Taylor	Ray Weedon	Ben Howard, Kevin Lloyd, Greg Powell, Philip Ryan
5	27 September 1986	"Extreme Prejudice"	Jeffrey Caine	John Hough	Paul Hudson	Clive Mantle, Stephan Chase, Mark Ryan, Kenneth Gilbert, Roy Boyd, Wayne Michaels, Simon Crane, Linzi Drew, Terence Plummer, Marc Boyle
6	4 October 1986	"Bird of Prey"	David Wilks	Roger Tucker	Tony Webb	Nick Brimble, Annabel Leventon
7	11 October 1986	"Out of Darkness"	John Field	Christopher King	Paul Hudson	Julia Watson, Garry Cooper, Tim Preece
8	18 October 1986	"The Cortez Connection"	Guy Meredith	Baz Taylor	Ray Weedon	Susannah Fellows
9	25 October 1986	"Mantrap"	Murray Smith	Roger Tucker	Paul Hudson	Christopher Benjamin, Barbara Young, Cory Pulman, Heinz Bernard
10	1 November 1986	"Guardian Angel"	Ranald Graham	Michael Brandon	Paul Hudson	Kate O'Mara, Richard Johnson, Don Henderson, Damien Thomas, Derek Newark, John Ainley
