= Out (TV series) =

1978 British TV crime drama

- Actor Tom Bell during the filming of the series
- Genre: Drama
- Written by: Trevor Preston
- Directed by: Jim Goddard
- Starring: Tom Bell; Brian Croucher; Lynn Farleigh; Pam Fairbrother; Andrew Paul; John Junkin; Brian Cox
- Country of origin: United Kingdom
- Original language: English
- No. of series: 1
- No. of episodes: 6

Production
- Executive producer: Johnny Goodman
- Producer: Barry Hanson
- Editor: Ralph Sheldon
- Running time: 50 minutes
- Production company: Euston Films for Thames

Original release
- Network: ITV
- Release: 24 July – 28 August 1978

Related
- Fox (TV series)

Out is a British television crime drama written by Trevor Preston and directed by Jim Goddard. It was produced by Thames Television in 1978 and starred Tom Bell as Frank ("Frankie") Ross. It was hugely popular at the time of its release with an average audience of 10 million viewers. There was one series (6 episodes), with Bell declining to make a sequel.

== Plot summary ==
Frank Ross (Tom Bell) returns from an eight-year prison sentence for a robbery that was thwarted because somebody 'grassed' the gang. Nobody knows who put the finger on him, but Ross is determined to find out and seeks revenge on those who betrayed him. Whilst inside, his wife has gone into a home and his son is going off the rails. Little by little, Ross pieces together the trail that leads to a dramatic conclusion.

== Cast ==
The gang included John Junkin, Frank Mills, Oscar James and Peter Blake. Other notable actors included Norman Rodway (as Inspector Bryce - the man who put Ross away), Brian Croucher (Frank's only real friend Chris), Andrew Paul as his son Paul Ross with Linda Robson as Paul's girlfriend Mo, Brian Cox (as gangland rival McGrath), Derrick O'Connor and Bryan Marshall (two of McGrath's heavies).

== Cultural impact ==
In the weeks prior to its broadcast on Monday evenings, brief clips of the programme were shown to rouse viewer interest in which a character provided only the cryptic information that 'Frank Ross is OUT'. Also, around the time of the series, a lot of graffiti saying, "Frank Ross is innocent" appeared around London, an apparent parody of the "George Davis is innocent" campaign slogans still visible on walls at the time. When a rail strike disrupted many people's plans to make it home in time for the final episode, "who grassed Frank Ross?" could be seen scrawled across blackboards at Euston station.

== Awards ==
Tom Bell was nominated for Best Television Actor BAFTA, whilst Ralph Sheldon won for Television Craft/Film Editor, in 1979.

== See also ==
Fox (TV series), 1980 series by Trevor Preston and Jim Goddard
