= Parker (1984 film) =

- Directed by: Jim Goddard
- Written by: Trevor Preston
- Produced by: Peter Jaques; Nigel Stafford-Clark
- Starring: Bryan Brown; Cherie Lunghi; Kurt Raab
- Cinematography: Peter Jessop
- Edited by: Ralph Sheldon
- Music by: Richard Hartley
- Production company: Moving Picture Company
- Distributed by: Virgin Films
- Release dates: 1 November 1984 (MIFED, Milan); 3 May 1985 (UK)
- Running time: 97 minutes
- Country: United Kingdom
- Language: English

Parker is a 1984 British crime film directed by Jim Goddard and starring Bryan Brown, Cherie Lunghi and Kurt Raab, in which British businessman David Parker disappears on a visit to Germany. The film premiered at the MIFED (Mercato internazionale del film e del documentario) international film and multimedia market in Milan on 1 November 1984 before being released theatrically in the UK on 3 May 1985.

== Cast ==
- Bryan Brown as David Parker
- Cherie Lunghi as Jenny Parker
- Kurt Raab as Haag
- Elizabeth Spriggs as Mrs. Epps
- Bob Peck as Rohl
- Beate Finckh as Sister
- Gwyneth Strong as Andrea
- Simon Rouse as Richard
- Uwe Ochsenknecht as Boots Man
- Micha Lampert as Tall Man
- Dana Gillespie as Monika
- Ingrid Pitt as Widow
- Phil Smeeton as Reich
- Tom Wilkinson as Tom
- Hannelore Elsner as Jillian Schelm
