= Jim Goddard =

British film director

- Born: 2 February 1936; Battersea, London, United Kingdom
- Died: 17 June 2013 (aged 77); United Kingdom
- Occupations: Film and Television director

Jim Goddard (1936 - 2013) was a British film and TV director who was born in Battersea, London. He directed episodes of many UK TV series such as Public Eye, Callan, Special Branch, The Sweeney, The Ruth Rendell Mysteries, The Bell and Holby City. He may be best known outside United Kingdom for the TV series Kennedy starring Martin Sheen or directing the film Shanghai Surprise as a vehicle for newlyweds Sean Penn and Madonna.

== Biography ==
Born James Dudley Goddard in Battersea, 1936, he studied at the Slade School of Fine Art and then became a set designer. Following a short period at the Royal Opera House, contributing to productions by Zeffirelli and Visconti, he moved into television work. In 1959 he joined the ABC Television design department as a production designer where he could be working one week on a kitchen-sink drama for Armchair Theatre or the next on a children's sci-fi series. Significantly he worked on The Avengers series which ran on ITV from 1961 to 1969.

He first achieved recognition as a director for his work on five episodes of ABC TV's Tempo (1965–67), an arts magazine show, which led to his close friendship with Trevor Preston and Mike Hodges. Preston and Hodges were influential in establishing Euston Films. Goddard, Preston and Terry Green, whilst at ABC in 1965, produced a detailed proposal for a specialist production unit that shot dramas on 16mm film, rather than the then usual larger videotape cameras. This smaller film unit became the standard for Euston Films, a company that played an important role in Goddard's future career.

== Filmography ==
- Out (1978 TV series, 6 episodes)
- Fox (1980 TV series, 13 episodes)
- The Black Stuff (1980 BBC TV play that launched the Boys from the Blackstuff series)
- A Tale of Two Cities (1980 TV film)
- Smuggler (1981 TV miniseries, directed episodes 3, 6, 9, 12, and 13)
- The Life and Adventures of Nicholas Nickleby (1982 TV miniseries)
- Reilly, Ace of Spies (1983 TV miniseries)
- Kennedy (1983 TV miniseries)
- Parker (1984)
- Hitler's SS: Portrait in Evil (1985 TV film)
- Shanghai Surprise (1986)
- Metamorphosis (1987 TV film)
- The Impossible Spy (1987 TV film)
- The Four Minute Mile (1988 TV miniseries)
- The Free Frenchman (1989 TV miniseries)
- De terre et de sang (1992 TV film)
- Lie Down with Lions (1994 TV miniseries)
- Gadgetman (1996 TV film)
- The House of Angelo (1997)

== Awards ==
- 1984 – Won the British Academy Television Award for Best Drama Series for Kennedy (1983).
- 1985 – Nominated for Best Film for Parker (1986) at Mystfest.
- 1987 – Nominated for a Golden Raspberry Award for Worst Director for Shanghai Surprise.
