= The Sweeney =

British crime drama television series (1975–1978)

- Created by: Ian Kennedy Martin
- Starring: John Thaw; Dennis Waterman; Garfield Morgan
- Theme music composer: Harry North
- Country of origin: United Kingdom
- Original language: English
- No. of series: 4
- No. of episodes: 53

Production
- Executive producers: Lloyd Shirley; George Taylor
- Producer: Ted Childs
- Production locations: West London; South East England
- Running time: 50 minutes
- Production company: Euston Films Ltd for Thames Television
- Budget: £40,000 per episode

Original release
- Network: ITV
- Release: 2 January 1975 – 28 December 1978

Related
- Regan (1974)

The Sweeney is a British police drama television series focusing on two members of the Flying Squad, a branch of the Metropolitan Police specialising in tackling armed robbery and violent crime in London. It stars John Thaw as Detective Inspector Jack Regan and Dennis Waterman as his partner, Detective Sergeant George Carter. It was produced by the Thames Television subsidiary Euston Films for broadcast on the ITV network in the United Kingdom from 2 January 1975 to 28 December 1978.

The programme's title derives from "Sweeney Todd," the Cockney rhyming slang for "Flying Squad," referring to the fictitious demon barber. Shortened to "The Sweeney," the term was used by London's criminal underworld in the mid-20th century to refer to the police.

The popularity of the series in the UK led to two feature films – Sweeney! (1977) and Sweeney 2 (1978) – both starring Thaw and Waterman, and a later film, The Sweeney (2012), starring Ray Winstone as Regan and Ben Drew as Carter.

== Background ==
The Sweeney was developed from a one-off TV drama titled Regan, which served as the pilot episode for the series. Regan is a 90-minute television film written by Ian Kennedy Martin for the Thames Television anthology series Armchair Cinema in 1974. The part of Jack Regan was written for John Thaw, who was a friend of Ian Kennedy Martin, with whom he had worked on the TV drama series Redcap in the 1960s. Dennis Waterman was cast after his performance in the Special Branch episode "Stand and Deliver", also produced by Euston Films.

The Regan film was seen as having series potential from the very beginning. After it scored highly in the ratings, work began on the development of the series proper. Ian Kennedy Martin saw the subsequent series as being mainly studio-based, with more dialogue and less action, but producer Ted Childs, inspired in part by Get Carter and The French Connection (both 1971), disagreed. Following this battle for creative control, Ian Kennedy Martin parted company with the project. His role as series writer was filled by his brother Troy Kennedy Martin, Roger Marshall, Ranald Graham and Trevor Preston.

Every writer on the series was given guidelines, "Each show will have an overall screen time (minus titles) of 48 minutes 40 seconds. Each film will open with a teaser of up to 3 minutes, which will be followed by the opening titles. The story will be played across three acts, each being no more than 19 minutes and no fewer than 8 minutes in length. Regan will appear in every episode, Carter in approximately 10 out of 13 episodes. In addition to these main characters, scripts should be based around three major speaking parts, with up to ten minor speaking parts".

Most TV police dramas had shied away from showing officers as fallible. The series shows a somewhat more realistic side of police life, depicting them as flawed human beings, some with a disregard for authority, rules and the "system". Police officers in The Sweeney are ready and willing to meet violence with violence when dealing with London's hardened criminals and are prone to cut corners and bend the law in pursuit of their prey, as long as it gets the right result. Until The Sweeney, the violent reality of policing was largely ignored by British television. The series broke new ground for TV drama and incorporated self-awareness and genre-referential humour. This is evident in episodes such as 2.7, "Golden Fleece", when Regan brandishes a lollipop at Carter and says "who loves ya, baby" in a nod to hit US crime series Kojak (1973–78); or in 2.10, "Trojan Bus", when Regan whistles the theme tune to the BBC's sedate police series Dixon of Dock Green (1955–76) after a particularly elementary piece of detective work.

The series also captured the zeitgeist as it was made during a dark period for the real-world Flying Squad. During the mid-1970s Flying Squad officers were publicly censured for being involved in bribery, corruption and for having excessively close links with the criminal fraternity. This reality served as a backdrop to the series and it is reflected in the mood, tone and story lines of The Sweeney. Detective Chief Superintendent Kenneth Drury, the Flying Squad's real-life commander, was convicted on five counts of corruption and imprisoned for eight years. Twelve other officers were convicted and many more resigned. In the late 1970s, this and other scandals led to a massive internal investigation into the activities of the Metropolitan and City of London Police led by Dorset Police, codenamed Operation Countryman.

== Cast and characters ==
=== Main characters ===
The two main protagonists are Detective Inspector Jack Regan (John Thaw) and Detective Sergeant George Carter (Dennis Waterman). The third is Detective Chief Inspector Frank Haskins (Garfield Morgan), their boss and a senior Flying Squad officer.

==== Jack Regan ====
John Thaw stars as Detective Inspector John Albert "Jack" Regan, a tough police officer, often frustrated by Scotland Yard's red tape. Originally from Manchester (like Thaw himself), he has been in London for several years. He occasionally refers to his northern roots (his poor upbringing and his father's work on the Manchester Ship Canal), which prompts banter from George Carter, a Londoner, such as humming "The Red Flag". A heavy drinker and smoker, Regan has some success with women; although not as much as Carter. He has an ex-wife, Kate, and daughter, Susie, who live in Ruislip.

Regan may be tough, but he is also a decent man, seen to help out an ex-informer whose son is kidnapped in 4.9 "Feet of Clay"; and his sympathetic pushing enables his boss Haskins to ask for help when his wife goes missing after a breakdown, in 4.13 "Victims"; it is Regan who finds her. Regan will bend the rules in order to achieve the desired result: for example, fabricating evidence, arranging for a criminal to be kidnapped, illegally entering private property and threatening to lie about being attacked by a prisoner in order to get information. Despite this, he has his own very strong moral code. He is unwilling to cheat for personal gain, delivers a blistering attack on a corrupt police officer, and refuses to take bribes.

Although he is seen driving various cars himself throughout the series, Regan usually travels by squad car with a police driver.

==== George Carter ====
Dennis Waterman plays Detective Sergeant George Hamilton Carter who comes from south London. In the series' timeline, George was in the Flying Squad prior to events in Regan, but quit for family reasons (cf. Regan and 1.5 "Jigsaw"). Carter is less aggressive than Regan and usually plays the "good cop" role. He is married to Alison Carter, a schoolteacher, but is widowed when she is murdered in episode 2.5 "Hit and Run". He is a former amateur boxer, as shown in the pilot Regan, and is described as having professional boxing potential in episode 2.1 "Chalk and Cheese". Like Regan, he enjoys a drink and follows football. After the death of his wife, Carter is shown dating various women in several episodes.

==== Frank Haskins ====
Garfield Morgan plays Detective Chief Inspector Frank Haskins. He is married and has three children, all at boarding school, and is Regan's immediate superior. Prior to the series timeline, the character had completed his National Service in the Signals Corps "in a minor intelligence role" (as revealed in episode 2.9 "Stay Lucky, Eh?"). He is frequently seen at odds with Regan, preferring more conventional "by-the-book" policing methods, though is still willing and able to "mix it" with villains on the street, giving Regan and Carter physical and/or armed support several times.

The main episodes featuring Haskins are 2.7 "Golden Fleece", in which he is set up to be the victim of a corruption inquiry, and 4.13 "Victims", in which his wife, Doreen, suffers a mental breakdown.

During the first three series, Morgan appears in the opening titles of every episode regardless of whether Haskins makes an appearance.

Haskins is absent at the start of the fourth and final series due to Garfield Morgan's other professional commitments, but he returns a few episodes in. Correspondingly, there are two versions of the fourth series opening titles, one with, and one without, Haskins.

=== Other recurring characters ===
==== The squad ====
The series introduces several other squad officers over the years including: Detective Sergeant "Matt" Mathews (John Flanagan); Detective Sergeant Kent (Carl Rigg); Detective Constable Jimmy Thorpe (Martin Read); Detective Constable Jellineck (James Warrior); Detective Constable Gerry Burtonshaw (Nick Brimble); Detective Sergeant Tom Daniels (John Alkin).

Regan's squad car comes with an "authorised" police driver. In the first series Regan has a variety of drivers including Len (Jack McKenzie), Fred (Denis DeMarne) and Brian Cooney (Billy Murray). Episode 1.7 "The Placer" introduces the character of Bill (Tony Allen) who becomes Regan's regular driver, although he plays a peripheral, non-speaking role in most episodes. Allen subsequently worked as wardrobe manager for many of John Thaw's later projects.

When Haskins is absent, other senior officers step in to manage the squad, including Detective Chief Inspector Stephen Quirk (Bill Maynard) and Detective Chief Inspector Anderson (Richard Wilson), sarcastically referred to as "Andy Pandy" by Regan, Carter, and other squad officers.

Other more senior officers include: Detective Chief Superintendent Maynon (Morris Perry), a semi-regular throughout the series and more willing than Haskins to bend the rules to get a result (later promoted to Commander); Detective Superintendent Grant (T.P. McKenna); Detective Chief Superintendent Braithwaite (Benjamin Whitrow). Colin Douglas features as an unnamed commander in series 1, with Michael Latimer as Commander Jackman in series 2.

The relationship between squad officers is largely informal. Regan is always referred to as "Guv'nor", or just "Guv". He invariably calls Carter and the other squad members by their first names, or occasionally nicknames. Carter, as Regan's assigned sergeant, is frequently addressed by constables as "Skipper" or "Skip". When off duty, Regan and Carter are friends and drinking buddies, so in private Carter calls him "Jack". This is all in accordance with widespread police convention. Everyone calls DCI Haskins simply "Haskins" (or "Mister Haskins"), though Regan occasionally calls him by his first name, "Frank".

==== The cars ====
The cars used in The Sweeney became almost as important to the series as any of the human characters.

The best known car in the series is NHK 295M, a metallic copper-bronze ("Tawny Metallic") 1974 Ford Consul 3000 GT V6 (often mistaken for a Granada Mk1). As well as being the main squad car used to get Regan and Carter around London, it also features in the opening titles of series 1-3, driven by stunt man Joe Wadham.

Other squad cars featured include an onyx green 1973 Ford Granada 3.0 Ghia Mk1 (NHK 292M), a blue 1974 Ford Cortina 2000 XL Mk3 (NHK 296M) (usually shown as Carter's car, but occasionally doubling as a Panda car with a light bar added to the roof), a bronze 1976 Ford Granada Mk1 3.0 Ghia X (RHJ 997R). The main squad cars were supplied for filming by Ford from its press fleet at no cost, and the producers were specifically told that the cars were not to be damaged. Such was the prominence of the company's cars in the series, it was jokingly referred to as "The Ford Squad". In later episodes Ford updated the cars, providing a metallic silver Mk1 Ford Granada S 3.0 V6 (NWC 301P), a silver 1978 Ford Granada Mk2 2.8iS (VHK 491S) and a silver Ford Cortina Mk4 2.0 GL (PNO 548R), among others.

The series is infamous for featuring Jaguars as the criminals' cars of choice. Jaguar S-types in particular were regularly deployed throughout the series as getaway cars, most notably in episode 1.10 "Stoppo Driver". A blue/grey S-type DWD 606C is used in the series 1-3 opening titles, pursued and chased down by the squad in NHK 295M.

One reason cited for the regular appearance of Jaguars is that they were favoured by the stunt drivers as being the "safest" cars to use (stuntman Peter Brayham devised the chases). The same few cars would be used and re-used, crashed, fixed up, and resprayed numerous times. According to Kevin Whately, John Thaw claimed that he had witnessed the regency red 1960 Jaguar Mark 2 (registration 248 RPA) used in Inspector Morse being written off several times while filming The Sweeney. Apparently, the car was in real-life a "polished up wreck" and would often break down during filming.

A red Fiat 850 coupé (UJB 92G) makes cameo appearances in several episodes: typically, it is parked at the side of the road as the action takes place around it. One theory is that the car belonged to a crew member who tried to include it as an in-joke in as many episodes as possible.

==== Family ====
Other featured characters include the close family of the three leads.

Regan's ex-wife Kate (Janet Key) appears in the pilot Regan and in episode 1.13 "Abduction". Their daughter Susie (Jennifer Thanisch) appears most notably in "Abduction".

Carter's wife Alison (Stephanie Turner) is seen attempting to prise him away from the squad in episode 1.5 "Jigsaw", while her hostility toward Regan is apparent in 1.13 "Abduction". She is murdered in episode 2.5 "Hit and Run". In the DVD commentary for "Abduction", it is claimed that Alison was written out because actor Stephanie Turner was asking for too much money to continue to appear in the series. Turner went on to appear in Juliet Bravo, also devised and part-written by Ian Kennedy Martin. Carter's mother (Katherine Parr) appears at Alison's funeral.

Doreen Haskins appeared briefly in episode 2.7, "Golden Fleece", portrayed by Anne Stallybrass. She has a larger role in the penultimate episode 4.12, "Victims", which deals with her deteriorating mental health and the impact of police work on family life; in this episode, she is portrayed by Sheila Reid. One of Haskins' three children, Richard (Stuart Wilde), also appears in the episode.

=== Guest stars ===
Guest stars in the show included:

- Joss Ackland
- Tony Aitken
- Tony Anholt
- Alun Armstrong (Note: Alun Armstrong and Dennis Waterman went on to star in New Tricks.)
- Coral Atkins
- Lynda Bellingham
- Hywel Bennett
- Brian Blessed
- James Booth
- June Brown
- Donald Burton
- Simon Callow
- Cheryl Campbell
- Tony Caunter
- Warren Clarke
- George Cole (Note: George Cole and Dennis Waterman went on to star in Minder.)
- Kenneth Colley
- James Cosmo
- John Rhys-Davies
- David Dickens
- Vernon Dobtcheff
- Diana Dors
- Colin Douglas
- Lesley-Anne Down
- Rosemarie Dunham
- Michael Elphick
- Arthur English
- Norman Eshley
- Derek Francis
- Ronald Fraser
- Prunella Gee
- Robert Gillespie
- Sheila Gish
- Peter Glaze
- Julian Glover
- Brian Hall
- Cheryl Hall
- Edward Hardwicke
- Tina Heath
- Ian Hendry
- Del Henney
- Paul Henry
- Julian Holloway
- John Hurt
- Ken Hutchison
- Barrie Ingham
- David Jackson
- Geraldine James (Note: Geraldine James and John Thaw went on to star in Kavanagh QC.)
- Peter Jeffrey
- Paul Jones
- John Junkin
- Roy Kinnear
- Ronald Lacey
- Alan Lake
- Lynda La Plante
- George Layton
- Maureen Lipman
- Sue Lloyd
- David Lodge
- Kenny Lynch
- John Lyons
- T. P. McKenna
- Philip Madoc
- James Marcus
- Alfred Marks
- Judy Matheson
- Bill Maynard
- Malcolm McFee
- Warren Mitchell
- Morecambe and Wise (Note: Morecambe and Wise appeared in return for Thaw and Waterman appearing on their show.)
- Lee Montague
- Patrick Mower
- Billy Murray
- Alex Norton
- Jim Norton
- Daphne Oxenford
- Nicola Pagett
- Geoffrey Palmer
- Moira Redmond
- Michael Ripper
- Maurice Roëves
- Sheila Ruskin
- Tony Selby
- Nadim Sawalha
- George Sewell
- Catherine Schell
- Anne Stallybrass
- Tony Steedman
- Dudley Sutton
- Gwen Taylor
- Stephanie Turner
- Patrick Troughton
- Peter Vaughan
- Colin Welland
- Diana Weston
- Geoffrey Whitehead
- Margaret Whiting
- Richard Wilson
- Stuart Wilson
- John Woodnutt

Many up-and-coming actors also appeared in the show during its run, such as:

- June Brown
- John Challis
- Carol Drinkwater
- Christopher Ellison
- Janet Ellis
- John Forgeham
- Richard Griffiths
- Karl Howman
- Sally Knyvette
- Patrick Malahide
- Andrew Paul
- Sandy Ratcliff
- Ray Winstone

== Production ==
The Sweeney strived for authenticity and social realism. This ethos was reflected in most aspects of production, from the storylines, casting, locations and most importantly the dialogue. As well as the series title, other Cockney rhyming slang gave extra colour to the dialogue, including "poppy" (money), "bottle" (courage) and "grass" (informer). Criminal and police slang was also used, including "ringer" (a car thief, also a stolen car with fake registration plates), "stoppo" (a getaway car), "snout" (informant), "factory" (police station/office), "fence" (selling stolen goods, also someone who sells stolen goods) and "fireman" (someone who deals with problems). Many of these slang terms were brought to a wider audience for the first time in The Sweeney, some even entered popular use, but the terms have remained part of the British crime drama landscape.

The Sweeney was shot on 16 mm film, allowing producers to use smaller, agile camera crews. This made it possible to shoot almost entirely on location for exteriors and interiors, helping to give the series a startling degree of realism and elevating London as a character of its own. Using film also allowed directors to feature many more action sequences. Directors Tom Clegg, Terry Green, Douglas Camfield, David Wickes, Mike Vardy and William Brayne were among the group of "guerrilla filmmakers" that realised the episodes. What they and the crews delivered is a fast-paced series, depicting the squad's relentless battle against armed robbery; but it also includes a substantial degree of humour. For the period it has a high degree of on-screen violence, and it is not unknown for several deaths to occur in an episode.

Each episode had a budget of £40,000 with an eight-and-a-half-week production schedule: two weeks' pre-production (for casting, finding locations etc.), two weeks' shooting, four weeks' picture editing (the first two weeks of which overlapped with the shoot), two weeks' sound editing and two-and-a-half days' dubbing.

The filming of each episode normally took ten working days, shooting about five minutes of edited screen time per day. Due to this, the number of different filming locations had to be restricted to ten, i.e. one location per day. At the Euston Films production office in Colet Court, Hammersmith, a standing set of the Flying Squad offices was constructed which provided an alternative option for when inclement weather restricted the day's shooting. Two days would normally be spent filming on the set, equalling ten minutes of any episode being set in the offices. Shooting took place through the spring, summer, autumn and winter months; exterior night shooting was expensive and was limited to three minutes of external night material in any episode.

=== Filming location ===
Most of the locations used for filming The Sweeney were around the west London area – in particular, Acton, Chiswick, Shepherd's Bush, Hammersmith, Fulham, Earl's Court, Kensington & Chelsea and Notting Hill districts, close to the Euston Films HQ at Colet Court in Hammersmith. The Port of London, derelict at the time, were ideal for filming location sequences. The opening titles were filmed in Colet Gardens. However, other notable locations in London, the south-east of England and further afield were also used for filming the show's episodes and included:

- Chertsey/Penton Hook Lock, Surrey – "Thin Ice", "Bad Apple", "On the Run", "Feet of Clay" and "Jack or Knave?";
- Battersea – "Jigsaw", "Stoppo Driver", "Faces", "Trap", "Trojan Bus", "Country Boy", "Visiting Fireman", "Tomorrow Man", "May", "Victims" and "Chalk & Cheese" (Craven Arms, Lavender Hill);
- Bermondsey – "Regan";
- Black Park Country Park, Wexham, Buckinghamshire – "Regan", "Payoff", "On the Run" and "Hearts & Minds";
- Dulwich – "Regan" and "Ringer";
- Dulwich Hamlet F.C. – "Ringer";
- Gozo/Maltese Archipelago – Sweeney 2;
- Earl's Court – "Bait" (Cromwell Crescent & Logan Place);
- Earlsfield – Garratt Lane and Garratt Snooker Club – "Supersnout";
- Hammersmith – "Jackpot";
- Heathrow – "Golden Boy", "Stoppo Driver" and "Tomorrow Man";
- Kingston upon Thames – "Hit and Run" and "Trojan Bus";
- Ladbroke Grove – "Hard Men";
- Maida Vale – "Night Out" (The Warrington Hotel);
- Peckham – "Ringer";
- Potters Bar – "Big Spender";
- Putney/Putney Bridge – "Contact Breaker", "Abduction" "Taste of Fear" and Sweeney 2;
- Queens Park Rangers F.C., Loftus Road – "I Want the Man!";
- Raynes Park – "Big Spender", "Golden Fleece" and "Victims";
- Richmond (River Lane; Leonard Gold's house) – "The Bigger They Are";
- Roehampton – "Queen's Pawn", "Golden Fleece" (Bank of England Sports Centre), "Victims" and Sweeney 2 (Danebury Avenue/Alton Estate);
- Sandown Park Racecourse, Esher, Surrey – "Big Spender";
- Shepherd's Bush – "Jackpot";
- Southall Gas Works – "Faces";
- Southwark – "Ringer";
- Staines – "The Placer";
- Tooting Bec – "Abduction" (Trinity Road and Tooting Bec Tube Station);
- Twickenham – "The Placer", "Golden Fleece" (Twickenham Stadium) and "Bad Apple";
- Uxbridge – "Thou Shalt Not Kill" (Brunel University) and "Bad Apple";
- Wandsworth – "Queens Pawn", "Jigsaw", "Abduction", "Country Boy", "Tomorrow Man", "May", "Drag Act" & Sweeney 2;
- White City – "May" (White City Stadium);
- Wimbledon – "Contact Breaker" (Wimbledon Stadium), "Stay Lucky, Eh?" "May", "Lady Luck" and "Money, Money, Money"; and
- Wokingham, Berkshire – "Thin Ice".

== Series overview ==
Series	Episodes	Originally released	
Series	Episodes	First released	Last released
1	13	2 January 1975	27 March 1975
2	13	1 September 1975	24 November 1975
3	13	6 September 1976	20 December 1976
4	14	7 September 1978	28 December 1978

== Episodes ==
=== Series 1 (1975) ===
No. overall	No. in series	Title	Original release date
1	1	"Ringer"	2 January 1975
Detective Inspector Jack Regan endangers an operation and loses his girlfriend's car.
2	2	"Jackpot"	9 January 1975
Regan and his team are suspected of pocketing £35,000.
3	3	"Thin Ice"	16 January 1975
A crook flees the country but leaves his beloved pet dog behind – Regan is determined to still bring him to justice. Meanwhile at Heathrow Airport, DS Carter accompanies a seriously injured passenger to hospital by ambulance.
4	4	"Queen's Pawn"	23 January 1975
Three crooks walk out of court as free men. Regan is determined to get a conviction and plans to make one of them turn Queen's evidence.
5	5	"Jigsaw"	30 January 1975
Regan tries to nail a criminal for robbery, and meets opposition from an MP.
6	6	"Night Out"	6 February 1975
Regan gets suspicious about an invitation to spend a night out with an old friend.
7	7	"The Placer"	13 February 1975
Regan goes undercover to break a ring of lorry hijackers.
8	8	"Cover Story"	20 February 1975
A beautiful journalist poses problems for Regan.
9	9	"Golden Boy"	27 February 1975
A chance encounter in a pub puts Regan on the trail of gold bullion robbers.
10	10	"Stoppo Driver"	6 March 1975
A gang boss plans to blackmail a Flying Squad driver into driving a getaway car.
11	11	"Big Spender"	13 March 1975
Large amounts of money being spent lead Regan to the Smiths – and another case.
12	12	"Contact Breaker"	20 March 1975
Regan tries to prove that a prisoner on parole has nothing to do with a bank raid.
13	13	"Abduction"	27 March 1975
Regan's daughter is kidnapped.

=== Series 2 (1975) ===
No. overall	No. in series	Title	Original release date
14	1	"Chalk and Cheese"	1 September 1975
A former boxing friend of Carter's is mixed up in a series of robberies.
15	2	"Faces"	8 September 1975
Investigating a series of security van robberies is multiply complicated by past Squad encounters and interference by MI5.
16	3	"Supersnout"	15 September 1975
With Haskins on holiday, Quirk takes charge – but his source might be wanting to do him over.
17	4	"Big Brother"	22 September 1975
Suspect Andy Deacon collapses during an interview with Jack Regan – and his brother wants revenge.
18	5	"Hit and Run"	29 September 1975
George Carter’s wife, Alison, is killed in a deliberate hit and run.
19	6	"Trap"	6 October 1975
After A10 investigates, Regan gets a promotion from the Golden Maid Dairy Robbery five years earlier.
20	7	"Golden Fleece"	13 October 1975
Two Australians commit eleven armed robberies.
21	8	"Poppy"	20 October 1975
Violent robber, Vic Labbett, returns from exile.
22	9	"Stay Lucky Eh?"	27 October 1975
Two safe breakers are robbed at gunpoint by a mysterious villain
23	10	"Trojan Bus"	3 November 1975
Col and Ray the two Australian armed robbers use a bus for an art theft.
24	11	"I Want the Man"	10 November 1975
Informant Popeye is abducted by Maynard.
25	12	"Country Boy"	17 November 1975
Telephone engineer Ronald Peters is kidnapped and bound by an armed gang.
26	13	"Thou Shalt Not Kill"	24 November 1975
The university branch of the National Mercian Bank is robbed.

=== Series 3 (1976) ===
No. overall	No. in series	Title	Original release date
27	1	"Selected Target"	6 September 1976
While in prison, inmates Titus Oates and Colly Kibber plan a robbery.
28	2	"In from the Cold"	13 September 1976
Some years earlier, Billy Medhurst a gang member who shot a police sergeant escapes to Spain but returns.
29	3	"Visiting Fireman"	20 September 1976
A Turkish policeman arrives in England.
30	4	"Tomorrow Man"	27 September 1976
Regan and Carter meet Dennis Longfield who is being harassed by a former business partner
31	5	"Taste of Fear"	4 October 1976
Regan's new skipper loses his nerve when two army deserters go on a violent robbery spree
32	6	"Bad Apple"	11 October 1976
Regan goes undercover to investigate police corruption
33	7	"May"	25 October 1976
Young Davey Holmes is arrested following the attack of a retired money lender.
34	8	"Sweet Smell of Succession"	8 November 1976
Gang leader Joe Castle dies and his associates clash over his legacy
35	9	"Down to You, Brother"	22 November 1976
Ex-criminal Raymond Meadows cons Regan to investigate his daughter's boyfriend
36	10	"Pay Off"	29 November 1976
A casino croupier asks Carter to investigate the disappearance of her boyfriend.
37	11	"Loving Arms"	6 December 1976
A hard up gunsmith is conned into adapting fake guns into real ones.
38	12	"Lady Luck"	13 December 1976
Regan meets a housewife, Marcia Edmunds, at a pub.
39	13	"On The Run"	20 December 1976
Violent psychopath Tim Cook absconds from custody during a hospital visit vowing revenge on Regan

=== Series 4 (1978) ===
No. overall	No. in series	Title	Original release date
40	1	"Messenger of the Gods"	7 September 1978
A drunk Regan pulls Lukey Sparrow for questioning for the theft of mercury worth £30,000.
41	2	"Hard Men"	14 September 1978
A dour Scottish sergeant arrives from Glasgow. Featuring a Glasgow Police Detective Sergeant Davy Freeth, played by James Cosmo.
42	3	"Drag Act"	21 September 1978
A gang of cold-blooded thieves set off on lorries, killing a driver and injuring a policeman.
43	4	"Trust Red"	28 September 1978
Despite losing his nerve, a lifetime criminal ex-para is coerced into doing one last job.
44	5	"Nightmare"	5 October 1978
A lorry containing cigars is hijacked and one of the robbers plus the driver is killed.
45	6	"Money, Money, Money"	12 October 1978
A former small time villain wins the pools but is then fleeced by a blackmailer.
46	7	"Bait"	19 October 1978
Regan is staking out a robber Vic Tolman.
47	8	"The Bigger They Are"	26 October 1978
A wealthy man is blackmailed by a petty crook who has evidence of his war atrocities.
48	9	"Feet of Clay"	2 November 1978
Alan Ember's son, Paul, is kidnapped with a ransom of £10,000.
49	10	"One of Your Own"	9 November 1978
Carter goes to prison with Jimmy Fleet to discover the truth behind a diamond heist
50	11	"Hearts and Minds"	23 November 1978
A professor with a secret drug formula is pursued by foreign criminals intent on stealing it.
51	12	"Latin Lady"	30 November 1978
Gynaecologist Dr Delacroix leaves his clinic on the way to the airport.
52	13	"Victims"	14 December 1978
Haskins' wife has a nervous breakdown.
53	14	"Jack or Knave"	28 December 1978
A security guard is killed during a security van robbery. The local police force fail to find out who was responsible, and Detective Chief Superintendent (DCS) Canning is needled by journalists who suggest calling in the Metropolitan Police. When the Flying Squad are called in, Haskins, Regan and their team succeed where the local police failed, and DCS Canning makes a complaint about Regan not keeping him informed. Regan is then arrested for a corruption incident nine years earlier, when he and Canning were both sergeants in the same police station. Carter finds a witness to what really happened, which clears Regan. Canning lies to Carter and Haskins saying that he had put in a good word for Regan. Regan is very bitter about what happened and blows off steam to Haskins and Carter and tells Haskins that he can stuff it, but after Regan leaves in a taxi, Haskins observes that Regan needs the job and will be back.

== Films ==
The cinematic versions of The Sweeney feature the same actors and characters as the TV series, however both films have levels of swearing, violence, sex and nudity that would not have been possible on television at the time.

=== Sweeney! (1977) ===
In Sweeney!, Regan and Carter become involved in a plot which shares similarities to the 1963 Profumo affair and British actor Barry Foster features as an American socialite loosely based on Stephen Ward. Made in 1976, and released in 1977, the film appears to be set in 1979. On screen and in-film references include the line "The same damned speech you made in 1978" and a large banner at the OPEC delegates meeting features the convention's logo and the year "1979". This suggests that the events of the film occur after the end of the television series chronologically, assuming series 4 is set in 1978 as broadcast. This in turn would suggest that Regan returned to the Flying Squad after all, following the events depicted in "Jack or Knave".

=== Sweeney 2 (1978) ===
In Sweeney 2, Regan and Carter are on the trail of particularly violent armed criminals. The gang has carried out bank and payroll robberies all over London and killed anyone who got in their way, even their own members. Regan and Carter are assigned the case as a last order from Detective Chief Superintendent Jupp (Denholm Elliott) before he resigns to face allegations of corruption in the courts.

=== 2012 reboot ===
In director Nick Love's film, the characters from the TV series are re-imagined, and the setting and action are moved to the early 21st century. The Sweeney (2012) stars Ray Winstone (who had a very minor role in the 1976 Sweeney episode "Loving Arms") as Regan, Ben Drew as Carter and Damian Lewis as Haskins.

The Guardian's Steve Rose gave Love's film a one-star review, saying that "rather than upgrading the 1970s TV favourite [the 2012 film] treats it like a stolen car – to be stripped down, resprayed and erased of identifying features. Only the brand name has been retained."

The 2012 film was remade in France as The Squad in 2015, also known as The Sweeney: Paris.

== Music ==
The title theme music, which owes a little to John Coltrane's track Equinox, and end credit reprise were both written by Harry South, a key figure in British jazz during the 1950s and 1960s. Dave Gelly writing in The Guardian called South's title music "the most emblematic TV theme of its day".

Incidental and background music for the series was selected from off-the-shelf production music libraries, including De Wolfe, KPM, Bruton and Chappell, Music by Steve Gray's library music ensemble WASP was specially commissioned, and featured heavily in the series. Some of the music was later issued on KPM 1000 Series albums The Hunter (KPM 1157) and Drama (KPM 1168), both 1975.

In 2001 a soundtrack album Shut it! The Music of The Sweeney was released, containing a selection of the incidental music used in the programme, some augmented with classic pieces of dialogue from various episodes. Also included on the album is the main title theme music from the first feature film, Sweeney!.

== Books ==
Nine books were written and released in 1977 published by Futura Publications Ltd.

- The Sweeney
- Regan and the Manhattan File
- Regan and the Deal of the Century
- Regan and the Lebanese Shipment
- Regan and the Human Pipeline
- Regan and the Bent Stripper
- Regan and the Snout Who Cried Wolf
- Regan and the Venetian Virgin
- Regan and the High Rollers

The first three books were written by Ian Kennedy Martin, the rest by Joe Balham. The plots of the books are not taken from any of the television episodes; overall, the tone of the books differs somewhat from the television series in that Regan is usually depicted as working alone, and his relationship with Carter is distinctly unfriendly.

== Popular culture ==
- In 1977, the BBC responded to the success of The Sweeney on ITV and commissioned its own hard-hitting police series, Target. It was heavily criticised for the levels of violence and the BBC cancelled it after two series.
- The repeat of the episode "Selected Target" on 21 December 1978 recorded the highest viewing figure of the series, with 19.05 million people watching. This coincided with a 24-hour strike at the BBC.
- The Sweeney is mentioned in the songs "Wow!" by Kate Bush and "Cool for Cats" by Squeeze.
- Reference is made to The Sweeney in the Black Books episode "The Blackout".
- A two-part 1998 instalment of Diagnosis: Murder, "Obsession", features lead villains named Carter Sweeney and Regan Sweeney.
- The creators of the show Life on Mars and its sequel, Ashes to Ashes, have often stated that The Sweeney influenced both programmes.
- To date, one episode of The Sweeney has been shown on the BBC. It was shown on 31 May 1993 as part of the "Cops on the Box" segment of BBC2's "Crime and Punishment" season. The episode broadcast was "Supersnout". It was introduced by Shaw Taylor, known for his Police 5 series on ITV.
- In the UK, repeats were shown on UK Gold and Channel 5 in the 1990s. In the 2020s, episodes are repeated most weekdays on ITV4.

=== Comics ===
In 1977 and 1978, publishers Brown Watson, which specialised in annuals based on TV series, published two editions of The Sweeney Annual featuring a mix of comic strips (some with art by Brian Lewis) and illustrated text stories, interspersed with occasional features on the TV series, articles about policing, puzzles and, in the 1978 annual, an interview with Thaw and Waterman.

From 1979, the comic Jackpot featured a strip called "The Teeny Sweeney" which was drawn by J. Edward Oliver. A trio of schoolboys played at being plain-clothes policemen, with two of them looking like little versions of Regan and Carter. They even had "Flying Squad" written on the side of their go-carts. Their attempts at being helpful, however, almost always ended in disaster.

=== Nissan TV ad ===
A TV ad for the Nissan Almera car in the late 1990s had two characters similar to Carter and Regan racing through London to deal with a "bank job".

== Home video releases ==
The complete TV series of The Sweeney was released by Network on fourteen DVDs in 2005. This release did not include the pilot film Regan or either of the two feature films.

Regan was released on DVD in November 2005.

Both films, Sweeney! and Sweeney 2, have also been released on DVD.

In 2007 Network released an 18-disc boxset containing Regan, all four television series and both feature films. The boxset also contains exclusive extras, listed below:

Regan:

- Introduction by Ian Kennedy-Martin.

Commentary with Dennis Waterman, producer Ted Childs and director Tom Clegg.

Series One:

- Interview with creator Ian Kennedy-Martin.

Commentaries with Dennis Waterman, Garfield Morgan, producer Ted Childs, writers Trevor Preston and Troy Kennedy-Martin, directors Tom Clegg and David Wickes and editor Chris Burt.

- "Thick as Thieves" episode and "Special Branch" episode.

Episode introductions by guest stars Warren Mitchell, Wanda Ventham, Prunella Gee, John Forgeham, Billy Murray, Tony Selby and Dudley Sutton.

- Restoring The Sweeney

Series Two:

- Interview with stunt arranger Peter Brayham.
- "Wild Boys" featurette.
- The Sweeney annual PDF.
- Interview with writer Roger Marshall.
- "Golden Fleece" episode script PDF.

Episode introductions by guest stars Bill Maynard, Gwen Taylor, James Booth, Ken Hutchison and Lynda Bellingham.

- Sweeney! film trailer with introduction by Lynda Bellingham.
- Sweeney! film promotional gallery.

Series Three:

- "Redcap" episode.
- "Morecambe and Wise Christmas Show" 1976 sketch.
- "Strange Report" episode.
- Episode introductions by guest stars Geraldine James, Steven Pacey, George Sweeney, Nadim Sawalha, Tina Heath and John Lyons.
- "ITV – This is Your Life" clip from 1976 Thames trailer.
- "Evening News Film Awards" clip.
- The Sweeney 1977 Annual PDF

Series Four:

- "The Electric Theatre Show" interviews with John Thaw, Dennis Waterman and Ted Childs.
- "This is Your Life – John Thaw" extract.
- "This is Your Life – Dennis Waterman" extract.
- Series 4 textless titles with dual sound.
- Episode introductions by guest stars James Warrior, George Sewell, Jenny Runacre, Nick Stringer, Gary Morecambe and Peter Wight.
- Sweeney film trailer with introduction by Ken Hutchison and James Warrior.
- Sweeney 2 promotional gallery PDF.
- Out-takes.
- The Sweeney 1978 Annual PDF.
- Stills gallery Extract from "Behind the Sunshine" PDF, recounting the making of "Hearts and Minds".

Sweeney! and Sweeney 2:

- Commentary on Sweeney! with Ted Childs, Ranald Graham and David Wickes.
- Commentary on Sweeney 2 with Ted Childs and Tom Clegg.
- Textless material.
  - These extras are exclusive to the boxset.

All four series are now available as Region 1 (North America) DVDs.

=== Blu-ray release ===
In 2012, the first series was released on high-definition Blu-ray by Network. For this release the original 16 mm film negatives were scanned in HD and comprehensively restored by BBC Studios and Post Production.

The pilot episode Regan was also given a Blu-ray release by Network at roughly the same time.

In September 2018, Network confirmed via Twitter that Blu-ray releases of Series 2 to 4 had been abandoned due to "lack of demand".

Old Gold Media has announced it will re-release series 1 on Blu-ray in the UK on June 2, 2025, from a brand new 2025 remaster. Two versions of the pilot episode Regan will be included.
