= Shadows of Fear =

- Genre: Anthology
- Theme music composer: Roger Webb
- Country of origin: United Kingdom
- Original language: English
- No. of series: 1
- No. of episodes: 11

Production
- Producers: Kim Mills, John Kershaw, Lloyd Shirley
- Running time: 10x 60 min, 1x 30 min
- Production company: Thames Television

Original release
- Network: ITV
- Release: 17 June 1970 – 31 January 1973

Shadows of Fear is a British anthology television series produced by Thames Television, which aired between 1970 and 1973.

== Premise ==
The episode plots are largely thrillers, similar to each other in that characters in each episode have someone or something to fear. The series usually did not explore supernatural territory apart from episode four. The main focus remained on down-to-earth fears of a psychological type.

== History ==
Very little has been recorded of the series' production history. Eleven episodes were produced; they were aired over a period of about two-and-a-half years. The first episode, broadcast in 1970, was followed by a season of nine episodes in early 1971. The final episode (thirty minutes long, rather than sixty) was broadcast nearly two years later in 1973. The series aired only once and was never repeated, until the autumn of 2019 when it began being shown on Talking Pictures TV.

== Episodes ==
No.	Title	Directed by	Written by	Original release date
1	"Did You Lock Up?"	Kim Mills	Roger Marshall	17 June 1970
After his home is burgled, Peter Astle (Michael Craig) becomes obsessed with ensuring that it does not happen again, an obsession that soon escalates to sinister proportions.
2	"Sugar and Spice"	Patrick Dromgoole	John Kershaw	12 January 1971
Anne Brand (Sheila Hancock) finds that her son is missing and her daughter (Suzanne Togni) is refusing to reveal where he is. Her husband (Ronald Hines) is discovered to have been having an affair and as the evening passes, the sense that something is wrong continues to build.
3	"At Occupier's Risk"	Peter Duguid	Richard Harris	19 January 1971
A young woman (Gemma Jones) arrives at a remote country inn, run by a strange couple (Anthony Bate and Annette Crosbie) who are curiously unsettled by her presence.
4	"The Death Watcher"	Peter Duguid	Jacques Gillies	26 January 1971
A scientist (John Neville) is determined to prove that there is life after death and is prepared to commit murder to do it.
5	"Repent at Leisure"	Kim Mills	Roger Marshall	2 February 1971
A wealthy woman (Elizabeth Sellars) recovering from heartbreak embarks on a cruise and is courted by a man (George Sewell) who may be trying to exploit her.
6	"Return of Favours"	Kim Mills	Jeremy Paul	9 February 1971
Mr Marsh (George Cole) discovers that his wife's unpleasant friend (Jennie Linden) and her married lover (Robin Ellis) have been using his flat for clandestine meetings without his knowledge.
7	"The Lesser of Two"	Kim Mills	Hugh d'Allenger	16 February 1971
A man (Godfrey Quigley) recently released from imprisonment, for a crime of which he believes himself innocent, finds he is unwelcome in his old neighbourhood.
8	"White Walls and Olive-Green Carpets"	James Gatward	Hugh Leonard	23 February 1971
A pair of former lovers (Ian Bannen and Natasha Parry) travel to the home of a deceased spouse and events of the past are exhumed.
9	"Sour Grapes"	Kim Mills	Roger Marshall	2 March 1971
Two English tourists in Spain (Daniel Massey and Isabel Dean) are menaced by a German criminal (Ray Smith).
10	"Come Into My Parlour"	Kim Mills	Roger Marshall	9 March 1971
A woman (Beth Harris) returns to her former job but is drawn into a macabre situation by a man (Peter Barkworth) seeking a gift for his fiancée. (This episode was produced in black-and white due to the Colour Strike).
11	"The Party's Over"	Kim Mills	Roy Harley Lewis	31 January 1973
In the 1920s, something is wrong in a couple's (Edward Fox and Suzanne Neve) marriage, leading to an impending murder that may or may not be imaginary.

== Availability ==
All eleven episodes were released on DVD in Region 2 in 2011.
