= Euston Films =

British television production company

- Type: Subsidiary
- Industry: Television production
- Founded: 1971; 55 years ago (original); 2014; 12 years ago (revived)
- Founder: Lloyd Shirley; George Taylor; Brian Tesler
- Defunct: 1994; 32 years ago (original)
- Headquarters: London, United Kingdom
- Area served: United Kingdom
- Products: Television programmes
- Parent: Thames Television (1971–1994); Fremantle (2014–present)

Euston Films was a British film and television production company. It was originally a subsidiary of Thames Television, and operated from 1971 to 1994, producing various series for Thames, which were screened nationally on the ITV network. Euston Films productions include Van der Valk (1977), The Sweeney (1975–1978), Minder (1979–1994), Quatermass (1979), Danger UXB (1979), and Reilly, Ace of Spies (1983). The Sweeney had two feature film spin-offs, Sweeney! and Sweeney 2, which were also produced by Euston.

In 2014, Euston Films was revived as a production company by the owner of Thames, Fremantle. In 2024 Fremantle laid off all staff at Euston Films and it ceased all production work.

== History ==
The idea for Euston Films dated back to 1965, when writer Trevor Preston and directors Jim Goddard and Terry Green were working at ABC Television. They produced a detailed proposal for a specialist production unit that shot dramas on 16mm film, rather than standard videotape.

The company was founded in 1971 when three Thames executives, Lloyd Shirley, George Taylor and Brian Tesler realised there was a market for a new type of television drama. To facilitate this new-style of on-location action, Euston used two crews filming different scenes of the same programme at the same time, which ensured production times were quicker. Euston eschewed the studio videotape shooting more commonly used in British television drama at the time, and material was filmed on location using the more expensive but higher-quality 16mm film stock.

Initial shows such as Special Branch gained reasonable praise, but it was The Sweeney that first gave the company critical and commercial success. Using a storyline style known as "kick, bollock and scramble", this formula continued in such shows as Fox and Widows. In 1979, the company created Minder as a vehicle for Sweeney star Dennis Waterman, giving the company its longest-running show. In September 1986, Euston Films announced it would increase its production of theatrical films in a joint venture with Film Four International.

With the demise of parent company Thames as an ITV broadcast franchise holder in 1992, Euston's output reduced. It continued to make Minder for ITV franchisee Central Independent Television, but when this series was axed in 1994, further work was not forthcoming.

Euston Films was based at Colet Court in Hammersmith, London.

== Revival ==
In March 2014, it was announced that FremantleMedia (who had relaunched the Thames brand two years earlier) was to revive Euston Films as a production company. Former BBC drama executive Kate Harwood was recruited to take charge of the company. In December 2015, Euston announced it had secured a commission of a new drama series titled Hard Sun, written by Neil Cross, the creator of Luther. Filming took place in and around London, and the series was transmitted in early 2018. In July 2017, Channel 4 announced a new crime thriller called Baghdad Central would be produced by Euston Films.

=== Euston North/Castlefield ===
Euston Films launched a second production company called Euston North in January 2017. While the company carries on with their work in London and the South of England, the MediaCityUK-based Euston North focuses on productions in Manchester and the North of England. On 7 June 2019, Euston North was renamed Castlefield.

=== Layoff of all staff ===
In September 2024, it was announced that all staff at Euston Films were laid off, with the Euston brand and IPs remaining at Fremantle.

== List of productions ==
Year	Title	Notes
1973	Special Branch	Series 3 and 4 only
1974–75	Armchair Cinema	
1975–78	The Sweeney	
1977	Van der Valk	Series 3 only
1977	Sweeney!	Theatrical Film
1978	Sweeney 2	Theatrical Film
1978	Out	
1978	The Sailor's Return	Theatrical Film
1979	A Deadly Game	TV movie
1979	Danger UXB	
1979	Quatermass	
1979	The Knowledge	TV movie
1979	The Quatermass Conclusion	Theatrical Film
1979–94	Minder	Dennis Waterman (1979-1989) and Gary Webster (1991-1994)
1980	Fox	
1981	Stainless Steel and the Star Spies	TV movie
1981	The Flame Trees of Thika	
1983	Reilly: Ace of Spies	
1983	The Nation's Health	
1983–85	Widows	
1985	Monsignore Quixote	TV movie
1985	Storyboard: King & Castle	TV movie
1986	Paradise Postponed	
1986	Prospects	
1986	The Fourth Floor	
1987	A Month in the Country	TV movie
1987	Bellman and True	Theatrical Film
1987	Lost Belongings	
1988	Jack the Ripper	
1988	Consuming Passions	Theatrical Film
1988	The Courier	Theatrical Film
1988	The Fear	
1989	Dealers	Theatrical Film
1989–90	Capital City	
1991	Shrinks	
1991	Selling Hitler	
1992	Anglo Saxon Attitudes	
1995	Carrington	Theatrical Film
2018	Hard Sun	
2019	Because the Night	TV movie
2019	Dublin Murders	
2020	Bagdad Central	
2020	The Sister	
2022–24	Wreck	
2024–present	Nightsleeper	
TBC	Tina	In development
