= Will Shakespeare (TV series) =

1978 historical drama TV series by John Mortimer

- DVD cover
- Also known as: Life of Shakespeare; William Shakespeare: His Life & Times
- Created by: John Mortimer
- Written by: John Mortimer
- Directed by: Peter Wood; Mark Cullingham; Robert Knights
- Starring: Tim Curry; Ian McShane; Nicholas Clay; Lynette Davies; Paul Freeman
- Country of origin: United Kingdom
- Original language: English
- No. of episodes: 6

Production
- Producer: Cecil Clarke
- Production companies: ATV, RAI

Original release
- Network: ITV
- Release: 13 June – 18 July 1978

Will Shakespeare, also known as Life of Shakespeare and William Shakespeare: His Life & Times, is a 1978 British historical drama series created and written by John Mortimer. Broadcast in six parts, the series is a dramatisation of the life and times of the great playwright and poet William Shakespeare, played by Tim Curry, and was co-produced by Lew Grade's ATV and RAI and distributed internationally by ITC. The two production companies had collaborated the previous year on Jesus of Nazareth.

== Cast ==
- Tim Curry as William Shakespeare
- Ian McShane as Christopher Marlowe
- Nicholas Clay as the Earl of Southampton
- Lynette Davies as the Countess of Southampton
- Paul Freeman as Richard Burbage
- John Normington as Alex Cooke
- Ron Cook as Jack Rice
- John McEnery as Hamnet Sadler
- Richard Cordery as Henry Condell
- Ronald Herdman as Sam Crosse
- Roger Lloyd-Pack as Jack Heminge
- Patience Collier as Elizabeth I
- Meg Wynn Owen as Anne Shakespeare

== Production ==
Each episode is based around the creation of a play and the idea of Shakespeare's life influencing his writing is used as the central plot device. As there are few known facts about the life of Shakespeare, Mortimer embellished upon stories or legends about the playwright's life. These include a supposed apprenticeship with Christopher Marlowe and a homoerotic relationship with the Earl of Southampton.

Mortimer also invented a character whom the Dark Lady of Shakespeare's sonnets was supposedly based upon. The wife of a judge, she falls in love with Shakespeare after seeing his performance as Tybalt in Romeo and Juliet, adding a secondary storyline elaborating on class divisions.

The series was filmed in Elstree Studios on a set built for Clayhanger.

== Episodes ==
All episodes are written by John Mortimer.

No.	Title	Directed by	Original release date
1	"Dead Shepherd"	Peter Wood	13 June 1978
In which Will progresses from ostler to cockerel to ghostwriter - to London's premier playwright as Kit Marlowe falls from grace.
2	"Alms for Oblivion"	Mark Cullingham	20 June 1978
Will's new troupe of actors arrive in a plague-ridden London and perform Richard III to great acclaim, but a death in the family jeopardises all. A handsome rogue is not what he seems, luckily for Will.
3	"Of Comfort and Despair"	Mark Cullingham	27 June 1978
Plague over, life returns to normal in London and the theatres reopen. The inconstancy of a dark mistress and the jealousy of an Earl conspire to enlarge Will's understanding of human nature.
4	"The Loved Boy"	Mark Cullingham	4 July 1978
Will's taking his son to London to introduce him to life and get to know him proves to be a mixed blessing with a tragic ending.
5	"Rebellion's Masterpiece"	Robert Knights	11 July 1978
In the wake of Essex's failure to tame the Irish rebels, the actors' brush with politics has catastrophic consequences.
6	"The Living Record"	Robert Knights	18 July 1978
While Will pleads with the dying Queen for suicidal Hal's life, his poems are stolen, printed and distributed without his permission, setting in motion a chain of events that could prove disastrous.

== Original literary material ==
In 1977, Hodder and Stoughton published Will Shakespeare as written by John Mortimer, author of the Rumpole series. Coronet published the paperback edition in 1977, ISBN 0-340-21979-3.

== Video release ==
The series was initially released on VHS under the title William Shakespeare: His Life & Times. A Region 1 DVD release of the series, by A & E television, was released in 2008, simply titled Will Shakespeare. Network Studio released a Region 2 DVD of the series in 2009 under the same title.

== See also ==
- Will (TV series), a 2017 drama about Shakespeare
