= Miracles Take Longer =

British drama television series

- Genre: Drama
- Created by: John Kershaw
- Starring: Patsy Byrne; Lynette Davies
- Country of origin: United Kingdom
- Original language: English
- No. of series: 1
- No. of episodes: 36

Production
- Producers: Brenda Ennis; Michele Buck
- Running time: 30 minutes

Original release
- Network: ITV
- Release: 9 January – 15 May 1984

Miracles Take Longer is a British drama television series broadcast on ITV from January 1984 to May 1984 made by Thames Television.

The drama depicted the life and cases dealt with by a branch of the Citizens Advice Bureau.

The programme was networked at 15.30 on Mondays and Tuesdays excluding Bank Holidays and the March Budget. TVS and Central aired it on different days.

Only one series was made and was replaced by the British soap opera Gems and different Australian serials around the country.

Miracles Take Longer was devised by John Kershaw. The series scriptwriters included: Robert Holmes and Johnny Byrne.

== Cast ==
- Patsy Byrne – Betty Hackforth
- Rosemary Williams – Sue Godfrey
- Lynette Davies – Jenny Swanne
- Terence Harvey – David Lewis
- Polly Hemingway – Paula Sheardon
- Richard Warner – Barry Goodson
- Carolyn Pickles – Vicky Thomas
