= Ace of Wands (TV series) =

- Genre: Children's television; Contemporary fantasy; Science fiction
- Created by: Trevor Preston
- Directed by: Pamela Lonsdale; John Russell
- Starring: Michael MacKenzie
- Theme music composer: Andy Bown
- Opening theme: "Tarot"
- Ending theme: "Tarot"
- Country of origin: United Kingdom
- Original language: English
- No. of series: 3
- No. of episodes: 46 (26 missing)

Production
- Running time: c. 25 mins

Original release
- Network: ITV
- Release: 29 July 1970 – 29 November 1972

Ace of Wands is a British fantasy children's television show broadcast on ITV between 1970 and 1972. Created by Trevor Preston and Pamela Lonsdale and produced by Thames Television, the series starred Michael MacKenzie as Tarot. It ran for two seasons of thirteen episodes and a third season of twenty.

== Premise ==
The title, taken from the name of a tarot card, describes the principal character, called Tarot (played by Michael MacKenzie), who combined stage magic with real supernatural powers and fought various evildoers. Tarot owned a pet owl named Ozymandias played by Fred Owl.

== Plot ==
In the first two series, Tarot (Michael Mackenzie) is assisted by Sam Maxstead (Tony Selby), a reformed convict; and by the orphan Lillian "Lulli" Palmer (Judy Loe), who shares a telepathic link with Tarot, which enables them to communicate over great distances.

After Selby and Loe had to leave the programme because of prior commitments, in the third series, this pair were replaced by brother and sister Chas (Roy Holder), a photographer; and Mikki (Petra Markham), a journalist, who had similar roles in the series and also shared a telepathic link with Tarot. Sam and Lulli's absences were explained by Tarot at the start of series 3: Sam had gone into the road haulage business, and Lulli was now married.

A character named Mr. Sweet (Donald Layne-Smith), who runs an antiquarian bookshop, often has the answer to Tarot's questions. Sweet is based in a university for the third series.

== Cast ==
- Michael MacKenzie as Tarot
- Tony Selby as Sam Maxstead (series 1 and 2)
- Judy Loe as Lulli Palmer (series 1 and 2)
- Roy Holder as Chas Diamond (series 3)
- Petra Markham as Mikki Diamond (series 3)

== Episodes ==
=== Missing episodes ===
All episodes were transmitted from 625 line PAL colour videotape. The videotapes of the first two series of the show have been wiped, and not even any 16mm black-and-white film telerecordings, made for overseas sales to countries not yet broadcasting in colour, are known to exist. The final series is intact and available on DVD. Variable quality off-air audio recordings of nine episodes of Series Two are available here on YouTube.

=== Series 1 (29 July–21 October 1970) ===
==== "One and One and One are Four" ====
3 episodes. Tarot is on the trail of a cure for paralysis. In the wrong hands, those of Madame Midnight (Hildegarde Neil) and accomplice Teddy Talk (Michael Standing), it is a formidable weapon. With Frederick Peisley as Prof Ekdorf, David Prowse as Kal, Tony Caunter as Six, Daphne Heard as Ma Epps, Bruce Boa as Mr. America and Jan Conrad as Mr. Russia.

==== "The Mind Robbers" ====
4 episodes. Old adversary Senor Zandor (Vernon Dobtcheff) has kidnapped two government ministers. Tarot traces them to a mysterious house where he meets Fat Boy (Michael Wynne) and strange creatures. With Sheelah Wilcox as Miss Jelicoe, Geoffrey Lumsden as Sir William, Terry Walsh as Castor and Alan Chuntz as Pollux.

==== "Now You See It, Now You Don't" ====
2 episodes. A bank robbery leads to a villain with delusions of grandeur in a houseboat filled with computers and Nazis. With Christopher Benjamin as Falk, Kevin Stoney as a bank Manager, Tim Curry as a cashier, Ray Barron as Macready, Alan Tucker as Gaston and Billy Cornelius as a Guard.

==== "The Smile" ====
4 episodes. Master art thief Tun-Ju (Willoughby Goddard) and accomplice Mrs Kite (Dorothy Reynolds) plan to steal the Mona Lisa. Featuring John Barron as Bartlett Bonnington, Reg Lye as Digger Farmer, Patrick McAlinney as Sir Patrick Landau, Diana King as Lady Landau and Tom Gan as a Japanese bodyguard

=== Series 2 (21 July–13 October 1971) ===
==== "Seven Serpents, Sulphur and Salt" ====
3 episodes. Mr Stabs (Russell Hunter), an evil magician, plans with the help of Polandi (Harriet Harper) and servant Luko (Ian Trigger) to steal the missing segment of the Secret Seven Serpents from Tarot. Featuring Jack Woolgar as Charlie Postle and Llewellyn Rees as Mr. Christopher.

==== "Joker" ====
3 episodes. Children have gone berserk. Tarot investigates, and meets the fiendish Uncle Harry (Dermot Tuohy) and his strange troupe of traveling entertainers. Featuring Carmen Munroe as The Queen, Roy Holder as The Jack, Walter Sparrow as the King, George Waring as the Headmaster, Sheila Raynor as the Headmistress and Lorna Heilbron as Miss Pascoe

==== "Nightmare Gas" ====
3 episodes. Thalia (Isobel Black) and her brother Dalbiac (Jonathan Newth) steal H23, a gas, which causes a deep sleep and vivid nightmares from which the victim dies of shock after 23 minutes. Featuring Laurence Carter as Dr Winthrop, Lewis Wilson as Police Sergeant and Alan Chuntz as Trooper

==== "The Eye of Ra" ====
4 episodes. Ceribraun (Oscar Quitak) sets out to steal a huge diamond called the Eye of Ra which it is claimed will turn people into chalk. Tarot traces him and is made prisoner of a talking computer who plans to use giant chess pieces to crush him to death. Featuring Edward Jewesbury as Mr Quince, Nicholas Smith as Fredericks, Charles Morgan as the Computer.

=== Series 3 (19 July–29 November 1972) ===
==== "The Meddlers" ====
3 episodes. New assistants Chas and Mikki live in a flat overlooking a street market which is under a curse. Involved in this is Mockers (Barry Lineham) the local prophet of doom. Also Paul Dawkins as Dove, Michael Standing as Spoon, Norma West as Chauffeuse and Stefan Kalipha as Drum.

==== "The Power of Atep" ====
4 episodes. Strange dreams after a meeting with medium John Pentacle (Sebastian Graham-Jones) leads Tarot and his companions to Egypt. Here, in Atep's tomb, they encounter a High Priest (Michael Mulcaster) and double, Quabel. With Michael Rose as a tramp, Joe Dunlop as Fergus Wilson.

==== "Peacock Pie" ====
3 episodes. Mr Peacock (Brian Wilde) has the irresistible power of suggestion: torn strips of paper can "become" bank notes and people do things they do not want to do. With Jenny McCracken as Young Mrs. MacFadyean, Dorothy Frere as Mrs Macfadyean, Valerie Van Ost as the Manager.

==== "Mama Doc" ====
3 episodes. When one of Mr Sweet's colleagues vanishes, Tarot traces him to a bizarre Doll's Hospital where Mama Doc (Pat Nye) and assistant Bobby (Michael Mundell) change people into dolls. With Robert Grange as Prof. Dorian, Wendy Hamilton as Posy Peagram, Ivor Roberts as Dr. MacDonald.

==== "Sisters Deadly" ====
3 episodes. Chas returns from a photo assignment with no memory of the assignment or that he robbed a village post office, which leads Tarot into a plot to kidnap a NATO Commander-in-Chief. With Henrietta Rudkin as Mathilda Edginton, Bartlett Mullins as Postmaster, Sylvia Coleridge as Letty Edgington, James Bree as the Major.

==== "The Beautiful People" ====
4 episodes. Two beautiful girls Dee (Susan Glanville) and Emm (Vivian Heilbron) refuse Mikki entrance to a small town fete, which leads Tarot into an investigation of extraterrestrials with strange powers. With Edward Hammond as Jay, Kathleen Saintsbury as Elderly Woman.

== Production ==
=== Music ===
The theme song "Tarot", was written and performed by Andy Bown (now with Status Quo). It was available at the time as a single.

== Off-shoots ==
The character of Mr. Stabs, played by Russell Hunter, is defeated by Tarot in Series 2, returned, again played by Hunter, in a 1975 episode of the horror-themed children's anthology series Shadows in the episode "Dutch Schlitz's Shoes" (Series 1, episode 6). This episode was also written by Trevor Preston. The character returned once more, this time portrayed by David Jason, in a 1984 prequel story for another children's anthology series Dramarama. This episode, called simply "Mr. Stabs", was Series 2, episode 7 of the series and was again written by Preston.

== Home media ==
A DVD of all existing episodes was released by Network UK in July 2007. It featured a new documentary in three parts by classic television enthusiasts and experts Andrew Pixley and Simon Coward.
