= The Trial (1993 film) =

1993 British film by David Jones

- DVD cover
- Directed by: David Jones
- Screenplay by: Harold Pinter
- Based on: The Trial; 1925 novel by Franz Kafka
- Produced by: Louis Marks; Jan Balzer
- Starring: Kyle MacLachlan; Anthony Hopkins; Jason Robards
- Cinematography: Phil Méheux
- Edited by: John Stothart
- Distributed by: Angelika Films
- Release date: 24 November 1993
- Running time: 120 minutes
- Country: United Kingdom
- Language: English
- Box office: $0.2 million (UK/US)

The Trial is a 1993 film made by the British Broadcasting Corporation (BBC) based on Harold Pinter's screenplay adaptation of Franz Kafka's 1925 novel The Trial.

Directed by David Jones and produced by Jan Balzer and Louis Marks, the film stars Kyle MacLachlan, Jason Robards and Polly Walker and has cameo appearances by several prominent British actors including Anthony Hopkins, Juliet Stevenson, Alfred Molina, David Thewlis, and Michael Kitchen.

== Cast ==
- Kyle MacLachlan as Josef K.
- Anthony Hopkins as Priest
- Jason Robards as Doctor Huld
- Juliet Stevenson as Fräulein Bürstner
- Polly Walker as Leni
- Alfred Molina as Titorelli
- David Thewlis as Franz
- Michael Kitchen as Block
- Tony Haygarth as Willem
- Douglas Hodge as Inspector
- Jirí Schwarz as Babensteiner
- David Schneider as Kullich
- Ondřej Vetchý as Kaminer
- Paul Brooke as Deputy bank manager
- Harry Burton as K's assistant
- Roger Lloyd-Pack as Stairman
- Oskar Hák as Verger
- Leon Lissek as Stairman
- Catherine Neilson as Washer woman
- Trevor Peacock as Examining magistrate
- Patrick Godfrey as Court usher
- Andrew Tiernan as Berthold
- Jiří Schmitzer as Thin defendant
- Don Henderson as Flogger
- Martin Faltyn as Clerk
- Robert Lang as K's uncle
- Jan Laibl as Chief clerk
- John Woodvine as Herr Deimen
- Jean Stapleton as Landlady (uncredited)

== Production ==
The film was shot in Prague and Kutná Hora.

== Reception ==
The film grossed £58,000 in the United Kingdom. In the United States and Canada it grossed $119,267.

== See also ==
- The Trial, 1962 film directed by Orson Welles.
