= The Winter Stallion =

- Also known as: The Christmas Stallion
- Written by: Paul Matthews
- Directed by: Peter Edwards
- Starring: Daniel J. Travanti; Lynette Davies; Siân MacLean
- Music by: Larry Brown; Richard Glasser
- Country of origin: United States
- Original language: English

Production
- Producer: Peter Edwards
- Cinematography: Peter Thornton
- Editor: Keith Palmer
- Running time: 95 min.
- Budget: £1 million

Original release
- Release: 1992

The Winter Stallion, also known as The Christmas Stallion, is a 1992 British television Technicolor film directed by Peter Edwards and starring Daniel J. Travanti. A Welsh language version titled Eira Cynta'r Gaeaf was filmed back-to-back and broadcast on S4C, which produced the film.

== Plot ==
Dai Davies (Eric Wyn) is a Welshman running a cash-strapped farm in modern Wales and raising his orphaned granddaughter Gwen (Sian MacLean) with the help of her godmother Nerys (Lynette Davies). When he dies unexpectedly, he leaves Gwen's guardianship to his estranged son Alan (Daniel J. Travanti), who has returned to Wales accompanied by his stepson Cliff Dean (Patrick Loomer). Alan's return pits himself against land developer Howard (Dafydd Hywel) and Cliff against Gwen's would-be suitor Gwilyn (Richard Lynch). As Alan and Gwen try to connect in the background of readying the farm's prize stallion Mabon for a race that could save the farm, Howard resorts to dirty tricks to try and force through the farm's sale.

== Cast ==
- Daniel J. Travanti as Alan
- Lynette Davies as Nerys
- Siân MacLean as Gwen
- Patrick Loomer as Cliff
- Eric Wyn as Dal
- Meredith Edwards as Sam
- Richard Lynch as Gwilyn
- Dafydd Hywel as Howard
- Gillian Elisa as Mrs. Howard
- Brinley Jenkins as Mr. Jones
- Menna Trussler as Mrs. Jones
- Geoffrey Morgan as Jack
- Huw Emlyn as Blacksmith
- William Vaughan as Councillor

== See also ==
- List of Christmas films
- List of films about horses
