= Thicker than Water (1993 film) =

- Based on: Thicker Than Water by Dylan Jones
- Written by: Dylan Jones; Trevor Preston
- Directed by: Marc Evans
- Starring: Theresa Russell; Jonathan Pryce; Robert Pugh; Catherine Neilson; Richard Lynch
- Music by: Daemion Barry; Julian Wastall
- Country of origin: United Kingdom
- Original language: English

Production
- Editor: Sue Wyatt
- Running time: 140 minutes

Original release
- Release: 29 July 1993

Thicker than Water is a 1993 Welsh thriller television film directed by Marc Evans and starring Theresa Russell, Jonathan Pryce, Robert Pugh and Catherine Neilson. It is based on the novel of the same name by Dylan Jones, about a Welsh doctor who attempts to put his life together after the death of his pregnant wife.

== Plot ==
Debbie and Jo (both portrayed by Theresa Russell) are identical twins. Jo is killed in a car accident, and her husband, Cardiff physician Sam Crawford (Jonathan Pryce) is grieving for her. Despite this, Debbie starts to act increasingly like Jo for Sam to overcome his grief. Sam meets with, and is drawn to, Chloe (Catherine Neilson), his wife's former colleague. Meanwhile, Debbie, whose fertility problems seems exacerbated by a post-viral weakness, insists that she still feels Jo's presence. Mysterious circumstances lead Sam to suspect that Jo's death wasn't an accident at all.

== Cast ==
- Theresa Russell as Debbie and Jo
- Jonathan Pryce as Sam Crawford
- Robert Pugh as Paul
- Catherine Neilson as Chloe
- Richard Lynch as Dorian Phipps
- Alan David as Chief Superintendent
- Crispin Letts as Nastygram
- Sion Probert as Nastygram agent
- Rhys Parry Jones as Charge Nurse Howard
- Lisa Palfrey as Young mother
- Ri Richards as Young mother
- Zoe Groves as Debbie (aged 8)
- Kristy Groves as Jo (aged 8)
