= Sweeney 2 =

- Original British quad poster
- Directed by: Tom Clegg
- Written by: Ian Kennedy Martin (creator); Troy Kennedy Martin (scriptwriter)
- Produced by: Ted Childs
- Starring: John Thaw; Dennis Waterman; Denholm Elliott; Ken Hutchison; Lewis Fiander; Anna Gaël
- Cinematography: Dusty Miller
- Edited by: Chris Burt
- Music by: Tony Hatch
- Production company: Euston Films
- Distributed by: EMI
- Release date: April 1978
- Running time: 104 minutes
- Country: United Kingdom
- Language: English
- Box office: £65,076 (UK)

Sweeney 2 is a 1978 British action crime drama film directed by Tom Clegg and starring John Thaw and Dennis Waterman. It is a sequel to the 1977 film Sweeney!. Both films are an extension of the British ITV television series The Sweeney (1975–1978). Some of the action in the film is transferred from the usual London setting to Malta.

The series and films depict a fictionalised version of the Flying Squad. The term The Sweeney is derived from Cockney rhyming slang, originating in the expression Sweeney Todd: Flying Squad, and is a real term used by the London underworld to refer to the squad, whose brief was to investigate armed robbery within the Metropolitan Police District (MPD), an area roughly corresponding to Greater London.

The film centres on the investigations of the fictional Detective Inspector Jack Regan and his partner Detective Sergeant George Carter.

== Plot ==
A group of particularly violent armed robbers, who are committing bank and payroll robberies across London, are taking just £60,000 from each robbery, leaving behind cash in excess of this sum. The robbers are willing to kill anyone who gets in their way: they even kill badly injured members of their team to ensure they cannot inform. As Regan puts it after the first raid, "I've never seen so many dead people". Meanwhile, a subplot takes place in a large hotel, in which the Flying Squad deals with an eccentric man armed with a bomb (who turns out to be in the CIA).

A bent senior officer, Detective Chief Superintendent Jupp, is asked to resign over allegations of corruption, and – just before leaving his post – instructs his subordinate, Regan, to take down the gang. The gang, armed with gold-plated Purdey shotguns, evade the Flying Squad for quite some time, leaving a trail that leads Regan to Malta and back, before he finds encouragement from Jupp, who meanwhile has been convicted of corruption – Regan having refused to testify in court for him.

== Cast ==
- John Thaw as Detective Inspector Jack Regan
- Dennis Waterman as Detective Sergeant George Carter
- Denholm Elliott as ex-Detective Chief Superintendent Jupp
- Ken Hutchison as Hill
- Anna Gaël as Mrs. Hill
- Lewis Fiander as Gorran
- Nigel Hawthorne as Detective Chief Inspector Dilke
- Barry Stanton as Big John
- John Flanagan as Willard
- David Casey as Goodyear
- Derrick O'Connor as Llewelyn
- Frederick Treves as McKyle
- John Alkin as Detective Sergeant Tom Daniels
- James Warrior as Detective Constable Jellyneck
- Brian Hall as Haughton
- Marc Zuber as Andy

== Production ==
Sweeney 2 is the second feature film based on Ian Kennedy Martin's original concept for The Sweeney. The first, Sweeney! (1977), followed three series on television.

Finance came from EMI. Barry Spikings of EMI Films said he made the sequel "because there's a demand for it. The first Sweeney film was successful so we're filling the demand by making another one."

The film tones down the violence of Sweeney!, although it does contain more nudity and swearing, resulting in its release with an AA-certificate (i.e. restricted to those 14 years and over), instead of the X-certificate (adults only) of its predecessor. However, the film is nevertheless significantly more violent than the TV series, and was re-rated as 18 when released on VHS in 1987.

As with the previous film, a number of the supporting characters are played by actors who had appeared in the television series, including Lewis Fiander and Frederick Treves.

== Reception ==
The Monthly Film Bulletin wrote that the film "looks decidedly old-hat, particularly since the series' basic premise – showing the police to be just as unsavoury and uncompromising as the villains themselves, while still ensuring that Regan and Carter are portrayed as good, honest cops at heart has unquestionably worn thin. ... None of the set-pieces exhibit any real flair or imagination and as might have been expected, Troy Kennedy Martin's script drags in all the familiar trappings of police brutality and corruption in high places without ever developing them as a credible theme."

The Radio Times Guide to Films gave the film 2/5 stars, writing: "In this second, dated-looking spin-off from the popular 1970s TV series, flying-squadders John Thaw and Dennis Waterman tackle upper-bracket bank robbers who fly in for each job to maintain their Mediterranean lifestyle. The leads struggle with material that would have barely filled a 50-minute television slot, let alone a full-length cinema feature." Leslie Halliwell called it a "silly, sluggish and violent extension of thin material which would scarcely have made a good one-hour TV episode. There isn't even an exciting climax."
