= Sweeney! =

1977 British film by David Wickes

- Film Poster
- Directed by: David Wickes
- Written by: Ranald Graham
- Produced by: Ted Childs executive Nat Cohen
- Starring: John Thaw; Dennis Waterman; Barry Foster; Ian Bannen; Colin Welland; Diane Keen
- Cinematography: Dusty Miller
- Edited by: Chris Burt
- Music by: Denis King
- Production company: Euston Films
- Distributed by: EMI Films
- Release date: January 1977
- Running time: 89 minutes
- Country: United Kingdom
- Language: English
- Budget: £1.4 million or £250,000

Sweeney! is a 1977 British action crime drama film and extension of the ITV television series The Sweeney which aired on ITV from 1975 to 1978. The film performed well enough at the box office that a sequel, Sweeney 2, was released in cinemas in 1978.

== Plot ==
Detective Inspector Jack Regan and Detective Sergeant George Carter become embroiled in a deadly political scandal. One of the leading members of the British government, Charles Baker, is about to secure a huge deal with OPEC (Organisation of the Petroleum Exporting Countries), stabilising the world oil market and boosting Britain's position within it. Baker is a rising star in the government, regarded as a future prime minister, and he is closely controlled by his urbane, manipulative American press secretary, Elliot McQueen.

That night, Regan is forced to drink alcohol, and completely intoxicated drives his car into a crowded market. The following day, he is suspended from duty for at least two weeks.

When a sex worker dies in mysterious circumstances, Regan investigates as a favour to one of his informants. He becomes aware that Baker and McQueen might be involved. A spate of killings follow, which sees Regan take on both the criminals and the hierarchy of the Metropolitan Police Service and the British security services.

Ultimately, despite having an injured foot, Regan returns from his suspension and he is reunited with DS Carter.

At The Tower Hotel London, Regan and Carter gather around a group of men with Elliot McQueen due to be arrested, but McQueen is shot dead by a sniper riding in a black taxi. DS Carter shouts the final words, "They didn’t kill him; you did!"

== Cast ==
- John Thaw as Detective Inspector Jack Regan
- Dennis Waterman as Detective Sergeant George Carter
- Barry Foster as Elliot Wainwright McQueen
- Ian Bannen as Charles Baker MP
- Colin Welland as Francis ("Frank") Chadwick
- Diane Keen as Bianca Hamilton
- Michael Coles as Johnson
- Joe Melia as Ronnie Brent
- Brian Glover as Mac
- Lynda Bellingham as Janice Wyatt
- Morris Perry as Flying Squad Commander
- Michael Latimer as P.P.S.
- Johnny Shannon as Scotland Yard Duty Sgt.
- Nadim Sawalha as Chairman of the Oil Producers' Conference

== Production ==
Sweeney! was made by Euston Films, who also produced the television series. Euston had been planning a feature film version for some time: this movie was part of a £6 million six-film programme announced two years earlier, in 1975, by Nat Cohen of EMI Films.

David Wickes, the eventual director, said Euston Films were reluctant to make a movie but then he persuaded them it was worth it by making it an "X rated" movie that could show things the TV series could not. Wickes also says Nat Cohen of EMI was so enthusiastic about a Sweeney movie that he agreed to cover the whole budget

Filming was relatively quick and inexpensive, using cast and crew from the series. Ranald Graham is credited with the script by Wickes claims it was entirely rewritten by him and Ted Childs. They developed the plot about OPEC and big business. It was also decided to make Regan more of a central character than he had been in the TV series.

The movie was released in 1977, following the conclusion of the show's third season on television, as a money-making big-screen outing for what had become an extremely popular series. In the 1970s it was common for television shows to be given cinematic releases, amongst which were some of the biggest box office hits of the decade. Most of these, however, had been comedies; Sweeney! was an attempt to make what the film magazine Sight & Sound described a more "internationally marketed action-packed screen adventure."

Several minor characters in the film had previously appeared in the television series. However, Garfield Morgan, who played Regan's boss, Haskins, in the TV show (but who would be largely absent from the final series on TV the following year) did not appear. As with the television series, a large amount of the filming took place on location (as on all Euston Films productions). The film includes some nudity, and a great deal of graphic violence, which had been impossible to do for a television audience, hence the picture was released in the United Kingdom with an X-certificate rating (over-18s only).

The film echoes the events of the Profumo Scandal which had rocked British politics more than a decade before, although the film has a much more violent premise. It also featured the major international issues of energy policy and oil usage.

== Reception ==
The film was praised for capturing the spirit and setting of the original TV series. It was successful enough for a sequel the following year, Sweeney 2, which saw some of the action set in the Mediterranean.

Announcing the sequel, Barry Spikings of EMI said the first film "was successful, so we're helping fill the demand by making another one".

David Wickes later said:

It made a fortune. The profit made by EMI Films was 1000% – £10 for every quid they spent on it. It was the most profitable film they had made for many years, and on the back of it they were able to afford to make The Deer Hunter (1978). I’ve still got a little hand written note somewhere from EMI that says ‘Pin this on the wall.’ It was the first week’s take from the ABC, Shaftesbury Avenue, where Sweeney! premiered. I can’t remember the actual figure, but it was something like £120,000 – and that was only from one cinema.
