= Lynette Davies =

Welsh actress (1948–1993)

Lynette Vaynor Davies (18 October 1948 – 1 December 1993) was a Welsh stage, television, and film actress.

== Life ==
The daughter of a Customs and Excise officer, Davies was born in Tonypandy, Glamorgan, in 1948, and was educated at Our Lady's School, Cardiff. She trained for an acting career at the Royal Academy of Dramatic Art in London before going into repertory at the Bristol Old Vic.

In 1974 she appeared as Regan in a Royal Shakespeare Company production of King Lear, and later the same year she played Yulia in the RSC's first British production of Maxim Gorky's Summerfolk at the Aldwych Theatre.

Her highest-profile role was as Davinia Prince, the central character in The Foundation, a British television series of 1977–1978 by ATV about the widow of a business tycoon.

In 1989 she played Doll Tearsheet in an English Shakespeare Company production of Henry IV, Part 2.

In December 1993, at the age of forty-five, Davies drowned at Lavernock Point, on the coast of the Vale of Glamorgan. The cause of death was later determined as suicide.

At the time of her death Davies was living in Cardiff, and she left an estate valued at £251,073.

== Screen roles ==
- Clayhanger (1976) – Adela Orgreave
- The Ghosts of Motley Hall (1976) – Miss Uproar/Imogen
- Raffles (1977) – Lady Camilla Belsize
- Will Shakespeare (1978) – Countess of Southampton
- The Foundation (1977–1978) – Davinia Prince
- Tales of the Unexpected, "The Last Bottle in the World" (1981) – Sophie Kassoulas
- Miracles Take Longer (1984) – Jenny Swanne
- Tales of the Unexpected, "The Best Chess Player in the World" (1984) – Paula Shaw
- No Place Like Home, "Dear Miss Davenport" (1986) – Celia Davenport
- Inside Story (1986) – Eileen Stead
- The District Nurse (1987) – Isobel Huxtable
- Bergerac, "Treasure Hunt" (1987) – Miranda Bassett
- The Watch House (1988) – Fiona
- The Christmas Stallion (1992) – Nerys
- Street Legal, "Children's Hour" (1992) – Dr Renata Berger
