= Yellowthread Street =

1990 British television drama series

- Title card
- Genre: Action; Crime drama; Thriller
- Developed by: Ranald Graham
- Directed by: Roger Cheveley; Syd Macartney; Gerry Mill; Ian Stuttard; Tim Dowd
- Starring: Ray Lonnen; Doreen Chan; Bruce Payne; Robert Taylor; Tzi Ma; Mark McGann; Catherine Neilson
- Theme music composer: Roger Bellon
- Opening theme: "Yellowthread Street"
- Country of origin: United Kingdom
- Original language: English
- No. of series: 1
- No. of episodes: 13

Production
- Executive producer: Keith Richardson
- Producer: Ranald Graham
- Production location: Hong Kong
- Editor: Paul Martin Smith
- Running time: 50 minutes
- Production company: Yorkshire Television

Original release
- Network: ITV
- Release: 13 January – 7 April 1990

Yellowthread Street is a British television police drama, first broadcast in 1990, that focuses on the work of a group of detectives in the Royal Hong Kong Police. Developed and produced by Ranald Graham, the series was loosely based on the novels by William Leonard Marshall. A single season of thirteen episodes was produced by Yorkshire Television and broadcast on ITV from January 13 to April 7, 1990. The series starred Ray Lonnen as principal character Alex Vale, with Bruce Payne, Robert Taylor, Doreen Chan, Tzi Ma, Mark McGann and Catherine Neilson also appearing as detectives in the series.

The series was well received by viewers and critics alike, despite only lasting one season. However, the series also received negative press, with Matters Criminous stating that "The series chiefest goal seemed to have been to explore just how very badly a dramatisation can corrupt and befoul the ideas and characters of a book." The series was also celebrated for the use of state-of-the-art technology involved with the production, including becoming one of the first series on British television with stereo sound. The series has been released on DVD in Germany.

== Novels ==
In the Yellowthread Street novels, the detectives of the Yellowthread Street police station are based in the fictitious Hong Bay, Hong Kong. Four principal characters are featured in the novels; DCI Harry Feiffer, of European heritage but third generation born and brought up in the Colony, Senior Inspector Christopher O'Yee, a half-Chinese American and the ever-bickering team of Inspectors Auden and Spencer, who attempt to find the rational basis for inexplicable and seemingly bizarre crimes.

One of the most notable novels is 1988's Out of Nowhere, in which Feiffer must figure out why in the pre-dawn hours, four people in a plate-glass-filled van with Chinese opera blaring out of the tape deck were driving on the wrong side of a deserted motorway, miles from the nearest on-ramp, before dying in a violent collision with an oncoming lorry. Sixteen novels were published between 1975 and 1998: Yellowthread Street (1975), The Hatchet Man (1976), Gelignite (1976), Thin Air (1977), Skulduggery (1979), Sci-Fi (1981), Perfect End (1981), War Machine (1982), The Far Away Man (1984), Roadshow (1985), Head First (1986), Frogmouth (1987), Out of Nowhere (1988), Inches (1994), Nightmare Syndrome (1997) and To The End (1998).

== Cast ==
=== Main ===
- Ray Lonnen as Chief Inspector Alex Vale
- Doreen Chan as Detective Jackie Wu
- Bruce Payne as Detective Nick Eden
- Robert Taylor as Detective Peter Marenta
- Tzi Ma as Detective Eddie Pak
- Mark McGann as Detective CJ Brady
- Catherine Neilson as Detective Kelly Lang

=== Recurring ===
- Kenny Chan as Detective Chan
- Diego Swing as Frankie Ku
- Ming-Yang Li as Blind Beggar
- Christopher Leung as Szi Tai
- Winnie Tang as Jei
- Nicholas Eadie as Finn

== Production ==
The series cost approximately £8 million. This made it the most expensive series fully financed by an ITV company at the time of its broadcast.

== Episodes ==
No.	Title	Directed by	Written by	Original release date
1	"Power Play"	Ian Studdard	David Wilks	13 January 1990
2	"The Lost Man"	Roger Cheveley	Eric Wendell	20 January 1990
3	"Key Witness"	Syd McCartney	Robert Hammond	27 January 1990
4	"Middleman"	Roger Cheveley	David Wilks	3 February 1990
5	"Angel Eyes"	Syd McCartney	Lawrence Gray	10 February 1990
6	"Fan Tan Man"	Roger Cheveley	Steve Burns	17 February 1990
7	"Rummy's Cut"	Gerry Mill	Claude Harz	24 February 1990
8	"Spirit Runner"	Gerry Mill	William Marshall	3 March 1990
9	"The Red Pole"	Ian Studdard	Steve Burns	10 March 1990
10	"Chinese Boxes"	Ian Studdard	Phil O'Shea	17 March 1990
11	"Slicing the Dragon"	Syd McCartney	Robert Hammond	24 March 1990
12	"Big Circle"	Gerry Mill	Steve Burns	31 March 1990
13	"I Knew a Man"	Tim Dowd	Lawrence Gray	7 April 1990
