= Codename: Kyril =

1988 UK Cold War espionage TV drama

- Screenplay by: John Hopkins
- Directed by: Ian Sharp
- Starring: Edward Woodward; Ian Charleson; Joss Ackland; Richard E. Grant; John McEnery; Peter Vaughan; James Laurenson; Denholm Elliott
- Music by: Alan Lisk
- Country of origin: United Kingdom
- Original language: English

Production
- Running time: 208 minutes
- Production company: Hartswood Films

Original release
- Release: 29 March – 30 March 1988

Codename: Kyril is a four-part British miniseries, first broadcast in 1988 over two consecutive nights. It is a Cold War espionage drama, starring Ian Charleson, Edward Woodward, Denholm Elliott, Joss Ackland, and Richard E. Grant. The spy thriller was directed by Ian Sharp, and the screenplay was written by John Hopkins, from a 1981 novel by John Trenhaile. The fairly complex plot concerns a known Russian spy ("Kyril") sent to the UK under falsely reported pretences in order to hopefully indirectly spark an unknown mole in the KGB to reveal himself; the endeavor eventually has repercussions which none of the initial players could have predicted.

== Plot ==
In Moscow, Marshal Stanov (Peter Vaughan), the head of the KGB, realizes that there must be a traitor within the KGB Moscow Centre who is leaking high-level information to MI6, the British Secret Intelligence Service. He secretly sends his most trusted operative, Colonel Ivan Bucharensky (Ian Charleson), as an agent provocateur to the West in order to force the traitor to reveal himself out of fear of exposure.

On Stanov's instructions, Bucharensky, who is given the codename Kyril, "defects" to the West and heads for Western Europe and then London. As instructed, he leaves behind in Moscow a fabricated diary which supposedly implicates the traitor within the KGB. Stanov keeps the fake diary locked in a safe, but spreads information about its existence and supposed contents in order to see who reacts, and how.

General Michaelov (Espen Skjønberg), an aged KGB hardliner, is persuaded by his deputy Povin (Denholm Elliott) to crack the safe and confirm the diary's existence, although Michaelov does not take the time to read the diary's contents. Povin also convinces Michaelov to attempt to have Kyril killed lest he divulge KGB secrets to MI6. Meanwhile, Povin is covertly sympathetic to the West, and sends messages to the head of MI6 via hidden microfilms carried by third parties.

In London, MI6 intercepts news of Kyril's defection. The head of MI6, 'C' (Joss Ackland), assigns his lead agent Michael Royston (Edward Woodward) to capture Kyril and pump him for information. Above all, Royston is ordered to prevent Kyril from falling into KGB hands lest he expose the KGB mole who feeds information to 'C'. Royston, however, is a double agent, with agendas of his own regarding Kyril.

Except for Stanov, neither the KGB nor MI6 know that Kyril's defection is false, or that Kyril is unaware of the identity of the traitor inside the KGB. Both organizations are bent on either capturing or killing him because they fear he may reveal critical information to the other side. Kyril treads a fine line of brinksmanship in Amsterdam and then London, evading death several times. And when his old enemy Sikarov (James Laurenson) is sent to assassinate him, this threatens not only Kyril, but also his long-time girlfriend, London physiotherapist Emma Stanton (Catherine Neilson).

As the net closes tighter around him, Kyril forces Laurence Sculby (Richard E. Grant), the MI6-hired lawyer of London gunrunner and intermediary Loshkevoi (John McEnery), to set up a meeting with the newly imprisoned Loshkevoi. Since Loshkevoi is one of Stanov's direct sources but has seemingly switched sides recently, he is the one person outside of Russia likely to know the identity of the traitor in Moscow.

The meeting between Kyril and Loshkevoi, arranged at a palace called Crowdon House, pits not only MI6 agents against Kyril, but also Royston against Sculby and Loshkevoi, and then Royston against Kyril in a climactic confrontation. The aftermath leads to surprising changes in the lives of some of those remaining, and to unexpected precarious uncertainties in the lives of others.

== Cast ==
- Ian Charleson as Kyril (aka Ivan Bucharensky), a high-ranking officer and KGB agent who is sent to London as an agent provocateur
- Edward Woodward as Michael Royston, a high-level MI6 (British Secret Intelligence Service) agent and covert KGB asset
- Joss Ackland as 'C', head of MI6
- Richard E. Grant as Sculby, a London lawyer who works part-time for MI6
- John McEnery as Loshkevoi, a London dealer who trades in arms, money, and secrets for the KGB
- Peter Vaughan as Marshal Stanov, head of the KGB at Moscow Center
- Espen Skjønberg as General Michaelov, an aging high-level KGB staff member
- James Laurenson as Sikarov, an assassin who is sent by Michaelov to London to kill Kyril
- Denholm Elliott as Povin, deputy to Michaelov at the KGB and MI6 assesst; he secretly sends information to 'C'
- Sven-Bertil Taube as Stolynovitch, a concert guitarist and friend of Povin's who carries his messages internationally
- Catherine Neilson as Emma, Kyril's true-love, an Englishwoman who lives in London
- Hugh Fraser as Peter Jackson, a go-between and contact between MI6 and subordinate agents
- Tor Stokke as Yevchenko, Stanov's deputy

== Production ==
Codename: Kyril was scripted by veteran television crime and espionage writer John Hopkins. He had written for several years for the popular BBC police drama series Z-Cars (1962–78), and had written the BBC adaptation of John le Carré's novel Smiley's People (1982, co-scripted with Le Carré), starring Alec Guinness. In 1965 he had also co-written the screenplay for the James Bond film Thunderball.

The serial was filmed in Oslo, which was used for the Russian locations; Amsterdam; London; and Bristol, which substituted for some London locations. It was shot on 35mm film.

Original electronic music for the serial was composed by Alan Lisk. The soundtrack also features some classical guitar music, including Asturias by Isaac Albéniz.

Ian Charleson said of his role as Kyril that it gave him a chance to do something he had always wanted to do – to pull out a gun and say: "One move and you're dead!" "Ever since I was a kid I've wanted to do the things this character does. I get to rush around corners with a gun in my hand." Concerning his role as the Russian mole, Denholm Elliott said, "I could have played Povin cool and elegant, but I wanted to play him seedy and scruffy. I'm always happier playing scruffy people and even when I dress up properly some basic seediness comes through." Except for Ian Charleson and James Laurenson, the two separate casts in Norway and England did not work together, which was a disappointment to Edward Woodward, who was hoping to meet Denholm Elliott.

Edward Woodward had a heart attack towards the end of filming, which incapacitated him for several months. Because of a director's strike, his prior filming on the American television series The Equalizer, where he spent months of gruelling 18-hour days, had not been completed until three days before his first day of filming in England for Codename: Kyril. The absence of a rest break after the exhausting American schedule apparently led to his heart attack. The heart attack occurred on 28 July 1987, two weeks before filming ended. To compensate, his character was written out of one scene, and in two others doubles were used and Woodward's voice added later.

== Release ==
Codename: Kyril aired over two consecutive nights in the UK on ITV in March 1988, and similarly in the U.S. on Showtime in April 1988. In Australia, it aired in June 1989 on Seven Network.

Due to a transmission error at the time of the original UK broadcast on ITV, three minutes of the programme were missing for British viewers in 1988. That footage contains information critical to the plot: MI6 operative Peter Jackson (Hugh Fraser) tells Laurence Sculby (Richard E. Grant) that he must pretend to be a Russian agent in order to gain Kyril's confidence, and tells Sculby to use the words "for the love of the Motherland" as a code phrase to convince him.

== Reception ==
Upon broadcast, most news outlets uniformly praised the serial's all-star cast, heavily credentialed creative team, excellent production values, and colourful locations. Variety wrote:

A two-part winner sure to bamboozle, worry and delight viewers.... The ins and outs, cunningly well defined, come together with a neat cynicism that marks the entire four-hour adventure.... Surprises jump up like coiled springs unleashed.... Beryl Vertue's production looks smashing, with top-flight camerawork.

Some outlets questioned the film's rather serpentine plot: "The plot is strictly for fans of the cerebral espionage genre" opined The Miami News. Some, like The New York Times, questioned somewhat the medley of Le Carre-like intricate espionage and Bond-like action scenes.

Upon the release of the DVD, the site DVDCompare.com summarized its review as follows:

A thoughtful blend of drama and action (including a great car chase through London, which comes at the climax of part one), Codename: Kyril is beautifully written (by one of Britain's leading television writers) and gorgeously shot. The (very respectable) cast is uniformly strong, and on the whole this is one of the best of the latter-day Cold War dramas."

HorrorView.com said of the serial: "[T]his is glossy prestige TV at its height, but with the kind of attention to character detail you don't always get to see these days."

And Alex J. Geairns at Cineology wrote that:

Codename: Kyril comes from an era where espionage menace comes from the deadly silence of its protagonists. This mini-series offers complex characterisations and an intelligent treatment of the theme of trust and betrayal. It's not from the James Bond crash-bang school of spying, having been adapted by the award-winning John Hopkins – whose previous credits include Smiley's People and Z Cars.

== Home media ==
Codename: Kyril was released on VHS by Warner Home Video in 1991, in a truncated feature-length 90-minute version. The full-length two-part 208-minute version was released on DVD in 2010 by Network.
