= Dempsey and Makepeace =

British television drama series (1985–1986)

- Main title card.
- Genre: Crime drama
- Created by: Ranald Graham
- Starring: Michael Brandon; Glynis Barber; Ray Smith; Tony Osoba
- Composer: Alan Parker
- Country of origin: United Kingdom
- Original language: English
- No. of series: 3
- No. of episodes: 30 (list of episodes)

Production
- Running time: 50 minutes
- Production companies: Golden Eagle Films; LWT

Original release
- Network: ITV
- Release: 11 January 1985 – 1 November 1986

Dempsey and Makepeace is a British television crime drama made by LWT for ITV, created and produced in 1985–86 by Ranald Graham. Lead roles were played by Michael Brandon (Lieutenant Dempsey) and Glynis Barber (Sergeant Makepeace), who got married in 1989.

== Premise ==
The premise of Dempsey and Makepeace is the oddball pairing of two police detectives: an elegant British noblewoman, Sgt (Lady) Harriet Makepeace, and a streetwise working-class New Yorker, Lt James Dempsey, both working for an elite and armed unit of the London Metropolitan Police.

When his partner Joey dies in a botched drugs operation and he uncovers police corruption at the highest level, Dempsey is under threat of assassination. With help from his colleagues, he hurriedly leaves New York for London, on the pretence of an undercover international police exchange programme.

Harriet "Harry" Makepeace is the daughter of Lord Winfield (Ralph Michael), who owns an English stately home. Reference is made to his having formerly been in the Army or the Secret Service. Makepeace's grandfather is mentioned as having been a Victorian collector of antiques and rare items. Makepeace's mother is mentioned only once, by her maternal uncle Duffy, and it would seem she had died some time ago; also mentioned is her best friend, who had an affair with Makepeace's ex husband and now lives with him. Makepeace has made her way up through the ranks of the police force, despite sexism by her male counterparts and the physical demands of the job.

Although there is initial reluctance on both sides, Dempsey and Makepeace work as partners in a specialised task force, SI 10, and they make a good team. SI 10 is under the command of Gordon Spikings, played by Ray Smith. A fourth regular role is that of Chas, played by Tony Osoba, who provides useful research and communications in the SI 10 office and occasionally has a more active role.

Two double-length episodes were produced, the first being the pilot ("Armed and Extremely Dangerous"), with the second the series 3 two-part opener ("The Burning").

At the height of the series' popularity, and during series 2 particularly, the British tabloid press hounded the lead actors for off-screen stories regarding their then-budding personal relationship.

Much of the show's appeal came from the good-natured "will they or won’t they" interplay and a slowly evolving romance between the protagonists, made possible by the obvious chemistry between the two lead actors. The show ended with an episode directed by Michael Brandon where Dempsey and Makepeace are forced to confront at least some of their feelings for one another. Makepeace leaves the force after having a vision of Dempsey being shot and killed in the line of duty. Dempsey tries to get her to return, after Dempsey's new partner—an old female friend of Makepeace—visits Makepeace to have a chat with Harry, it is implied from the conversation Makepeace is in love with Dempsey and can't bear to see anything happen to him. Dempsey gets her to help him when his new partner is injured. In the final scene it looks like they are going to join up as partners again as a call comes over the police radio they both smile at each other.

== Main cast ==
- Michael Brandon as Lieutenant James Dempsey NYPD
- Glynis Barber as Detective Sergeant Lady Harriet "Harry" Makepeace
- Ray Smith as Chief Superintendent Gordon Spikings
- Tony Osoba as Detective Sergeant Charles "Chas" Jarvis
- Colin McFarlane as Detective Sergeant Watson
- Jonathan Docker-Drysdale as Detective Sergeant Ward

== Production ==
=== Filming locations ===
In episode 9 of series 1, "Cry God for Harry", Chilham Castle in Kent becomes Winfield Hall, the grand English estate of Lord Winfield (Ralph Michael), and Chilham Square also makes a brief appearance as Dempsey and Makepeace approach the grand gates to the estate.

Episode 1 of series 2, "Silver Dollar", used London Weekend Television's own studio building and reception area as the location for the fictional company Consolidated Westmore.

Extensive filming was conducted at the disused remains of the East Greenwich Gas Works (the present-day site of The O2).

A shot of Chief Superintendent Gordon Spikings (Ray Smith) in front of Cutty Sark was incorporated into the series' opening credit sequence.

== Episodes ==
Dempsey and Makepeace ran for three series between 11 January 1985 and 1 November 1986. A total of 30 episodes were produced.

Series	Episodes	Originally released	
Series	Episodes	First released	Last released
1	10	11 January 1985	22 March 1985
2	10	31 August 1985	2 November 1985
3	10	30 August 1986	1 November 1986

== Broadcast ==
The show was originally broadcast on ITV between 11 January 1985 and 1 November 1986. From July 2009, the series was repeated on ITV3 in the UK, and again on ITV4 from July 2020 onwards. Forces TV showed it from 1 September 2020.

=== International broadcast ===
It was sold to many countries in Europe, including Eastern Bloc Czechoslovakia, Poland and Hungary. The programme was broadcast elsewhere worldwide, such as on Pakistan Television during 1985–86. The series was also syndicated to the U.S. airwaves in the autumn of 1985 (by Tribune Entertainment), usually broadcast on Saturday afternoons or early evenings. However, only the first 20 hours of the series were run in the U.S. By mid-January 1986, it was discontinued, with the 10 episodes of series 3 never being aired. To encourage interest, the show was marketed in the U.S. as being similar to a re-make of The Avengers, but, while well advertised, it never grew a substantial following.

== Reception ==
The show was also critically acclaimed.

All three series attained great popularity in the UK, achieving good ratings with 20 million viewers in the UK.

== Home media ==
- In the UK, all three series were released on DVD in 2006 from Network DVD.
- In Portugal, all three series were released in 2004 by Prisvideo, with English audio and optional Portuguese subtitles.
- From December 2004, DVDs and VCDs with all the episodes of the series were gradually added in Poland to a TV-guide magazine TV Okey!. In December 2008 a box with Season 1 episodes was released.
- In the mid 2000s a DVD was released in the Czech Republic and in Slovakia with Slovak dubbing.

== In other media ==
In the UK, Dempsey and Makepeace merchandise such as jigsaw puzzles, children's annuals and replica toy cars were produced.
