= The Old Devils =

1986 novel by Kingsley Amis

First-edition (publ. Hutchinson)

The Old Devils is a novel by English author Kingsley Amis, published in 1986. It won the Booker Prize. Alun Weaver, a writer of modest celebrity, returns to his native Wales with his wife, Rhiannon, sometime girlfriend of Weaver's old acquaintance Peter Thomas. Alun begins associating with a group of former friends, including Peter, all of whom have continued to live locally while he was away. Drinking daily in the pub with the men, he cuckolds most of them.

As in others of Amis's novels, the characters and parts of the plot are based on real people and experiences. A poet, Brydan, is a thinly disguised parody of Dylan Thomas, whom Amis once met. Amis had a low opinion of Thomas, calling him a "pernicious figure, one who has helped to get Wales and Welsh poetry a bad name and generally done lasting harm to both... the general picture he draws of the place and the people [in his work] is false, sentimentalising, melodramatising, sensationalising, and ingratiating". The novel incorporates a theme of perceptions of Wales in history and culture. It touches on the subjects of old age, alcoholism, marital unhappiness and unrequited love.

== Television adaptation ==
The novel was adapted for television by Andrew Davies for the BBC in 1992, starring John Stride, Bernard Hepton, James Grout and Ray Smith (it was the latter's last screen appearance before his death).

== Reception ==
Reviewing the book for The Guardian in 2010, Sam Jordison wrote that Amis's "comic genius relies so much upon build-up, context and impeccable timing that it can only be fully appreciated in its correct setting... get hold of the book yourself. It's that rare and precious thing—a novel that is a delight from start to finish."

The Los Angeles Times wrote, "For longtime admirers of the Amis of Lucky Jim and after, The Old Devils is welcomed evidence that the master remains masterful, able now to conjoin the mischievous with the mellow. As always, he is an insightful guide through the terrain where what is said is not meant and what is felt is not said, but where much of life is lived." The Old Devils was considered Amis's masterpiece by his son, Martin Amis, who wrote, "it stands comparison with any English novel of the century."
