= Catherine Neilson =

British actress

Catherine Neilson (born 3 October 1957) is a British stage, television and film actress, who was active from the late 1970s to the mid-1990s.

== Career ==
On stage, Neilson starred as Christie in Traps by Caryl Churchill, at the Royal Court Theatre Upstairs in London, opposite Tim Pigott-Smith, in 1977. The Spectator observed that the role was "superbly played by Catherine Neilson". In 1980, she was Anni in Make and Break by Michael Frayn in the West End at the Theatre Royal Haymarket. And in 1985 she starred at the National Theatre as Val in Neaptide by Sarah Daniels.

On television, Neilson's early starring roles include the two-season series Yanks Go Home (1976–1977), and Czech Mate, one of the 13 teleplays of the Hammer House of Mystery and Suspense (1985). In 1988 she was Ian Charleson's love interest in the espionage miniseries Codename: Kyril. On the Ruth Rendell Mysteries, she played Elizabeth Nightingale in A Guilty Thing Surprised (1988).

Neilson continued her television success with a starring role in Small Zones, a teleplay for Screen Two (1990), and she was a cast member of the crime series Yellowthread Street (1990). She also starred in two films by Ken Russell: The Strange Affliction of Anton Bruckner (1990), and Prisoner of Honor (1991). In 1993 she was in the main cast of the made-for-television thriller film Thicker than Water.

In feature films, Neilson had supporting and co-starring roles. These include, most notably, Lady June Carberry in White Mischief (1987) and Irene Saunders in Clint Eastwood's White Hunter Black Heart (1990).

== Filmography ==
=== Film ===
- Firepower (1979) - Hotel Secretary
- The Wicked Lady (1983) - Customer in Shop
- Biggles: Adventures in Time (1986) - Young Nun
- White Mischief (1987) - Lady June Carberry
- White Hunter Black Heart (1990) - Irene Saunders
- The Trial (1993) - Washer Woman

=== Television ===
- Warship (1976) - Rita Kersey
- Yanks Go Home (1976–1977) - Doreen Sankey
- Coronation Street (1979) - Karen Barnes
- World's End (1981) - Lynn
- Widows (1983, TV Mini-Series) - Trudie Nunn
- Mr. Palfrey of Westminster (1984) - Anna Capek
- Hammer House of Mystery and Suspense (1985) - Marie Vladekova
- Widows 2 (1985, TV Mini-Series) - Trudie Nunn
- London's Burning (1988) - Nicola McQueen
- Codename: Kyril (1988, TV Mini-Series) - Emma
- Ruth Rendell Mysteries (1988) - Elizabeth Nightingale
- Wipe Out (miniseries) (1988, TV Mini-Series) - Mika Reynolds
- Bergerac (1989) - Jennifer Sutton
- Small Zones (Screen Two, 1990) - Jenny
- Yellowthread Street (1990) - Det. Kelly Lang
- Casualty (1990) - Emma Lawrence
- The Strange Affliction of Anton Bruckner (1990, TV Movie) - Grete
- Prisoner of Honour (1991, TV Movie) - Eloise
- Perfect Scoundrels (1992) - Freestone
- Thicker than Water (1993, TV Movie) - Chloe (final film role)
