= Richard Lynch (Welsh actor) =

Welsh actor

- Born: Wales, UK
- Occupation: Actor
- Years active: 1986–present

Richard Lynch is a Welsh television and film actor best known for playing the character of Garry Monk in S4C's long-running Welsh-language soap Pobol y Cwm, on-and-off since 2002.

== Early life ==
Lynch is an alumnus of Ysgol Gyfun Rhydfelen, a Welsh Medium comprehensive school near Pontypridd. He graduated with in Drama from Aberystwyth University in 1987.

== Career ==
Lynch first came to prominence in the 1986 Karl Francis' film Milwr Bychan playing young soldier Will Thomas. Further film appearances include Branwen (1994), Darklands (1996), The Proposition (1997), and Y Mabinogi (2003). Lynch starred in numerous television productions and series, including The Christmas Stallion (1992), The Lifeboat (1994), Tales from Pleasure Beach (2001) and Hinterland/Y Gwyll.

In 2013 Lynch was awarded a Fellowship of Aberystwyth University.

== Partial filmography ==
- Milwr Bychan (1986)
- The District Nurse (TV series 1987)
- Babylon Bypassed (1988)
- Eight Men Out (1988)
- Spirit (1989)
- Screen One (TV series 1989)
- The Christmas Stallion (TV movie 1992)
- Thicker Than Water (TV movie 1994)
- The Healer (TV movie 1994)
- The Lifeboat (TV series 1994)
- Branwen (1995)
- Darklands (1996)
- The Proposition (1997)
- Dangerfield (TV series 1999)
- Score (TV movie 2001)
- Tales from Pleasure Beach (TV mini-series 2001)
- A Mind to Kill (TV series 1997–2002)
- Y Mabinogi (English title: Otherworld) (2003)
- Secret History of Religion: Knights Templar (TV movie 2006)
- Hinterland/Y Gwyll (Bilingual TV series 2016)
