= Ray Smith (actor) =

Welsh actor (1936–1991)

- Born: Raymond Smith; 1 May 1936; Trealaw, Wales
- Died: 15 December 1991 (aged 55); Llandough, Wales
- Occupation: Actor
- Years active: 1959–1991

Ray Smith (1 May 1936 – 15 December 1991) was a Welsh actor.

== Early life ==
Smith was born in Trealaw in the Rhondda Valley, and lived his early years on Ynyscynon Road, but lived for most of his adult life in Dinas Powys. He became interested in acting while he was at school, and was determined not to become a miner like his father, who died in a pit accident when Smith was only three years old.

After leaving school Smith became a builder's labourer. Following National Service in the army, he began acting professionally at the Prince of Wales Theatre, Cardiff, then joined the Swansea Grand Theatre as an assistant stage manager. He later moved to London, where he spent a year unemployed before obtaining a part in a play about the Hungarian Revolution of 1956.

== Television career ==
Smith made his television debut in Shadows of Heroes in 1959, and then his appearances in series such as Z-Cars and A Family at War made him known to the public. He also appeared as Detective Inspector Percy Firbank in Public Eye, a role he started playing in 1971. Two years later came one of his most famous roles, as George Barraclough in Sam, in a Granada Television drama series set in northern England. In 1973, Smith provided the voice-over for the British Transport Film "Britania - A Bridge", a film about the redevelopment and reconstruction of the Britania Railway Bridge between Anglesey and the Mainland. The Bridge had been damaged by a fire in 1970, it was reconstructed over the course of 3 years to incorporate a new 'double-deck', incorporating both road and rail crossings.

== Later years ==
Ray Smith died in December 1991 at the age of 55 in the lounge of Llandough Hospital after a major heart attack. He had been shooting one of his last scenes in the television adaptation of Kingsley Amis's novel The Old Devils when he was taken ill on location in Newport. An onscreen credit dedicated the series The Old Devils to his memory, and his performance in it won him a posthumous BAFTA Cymru Award (Best Actor) in 1993.

His son was the musician Huw Justin Smith, better known as Pepsi Tate.

== TV roles and filmography ==
- Nick of the River (1959)
- Edgar Wallace Mystery Theatre (1960) ("Candidate for Murder")
- The House Under the Water (1961) (7 episodes)
- The Terrorists (1961)
- Ben Casey (1962)
- No Hiding Place (1960–1963) (2 episodes)
- Tomorrow at Ten (1962)
- The Painted Smile (1962)
- Mystery Submarine (1963)
- Suspense (1963)
- Murder Can Be Deadly (1963)
- The Indian Tales of Rudyard Kipling (1964)
- Ring Out an Alibi (1964, TV miniseries)
- Moulded in Earth (1965) (TV miniseries)
- Z-Cars (1965–1970) (4 appearances)
- Candidate for Murder (1966)
- Softly, Softly (1966–1967) (4 episodes)
- Callan (TV series, 1967–1972)
- The Informer (1967)
- The Wednesday Play (1968) ("Mrs Lawrence Will Look After It")
- Half Hour Story (1968) (Stella)
- Company of Five (six-part series, including Shaggy Dog, a Dennis Potter play, 1968)
- Special Branch (1969)
- Detectives (1969)
- Saturday Night Theatre (1969) ("Bangelstein's Boys")
- A Family at War (TV serial, 1970) (episode: "For Strategic Reasons")
- Shadows of Fear (1970–1971) (2 episodes)
- Man at the Top (1971)
- Under Milk Wood (1971)
- Public Eye (TV series, 1971–1975)
- Made (1972)
- Country Matters (1972)
- Jackanory (24 appearances between 1972 and 1985)
- Colditz (1972)
- The Adventures of Black Beauty (1972)
- New Scotland Yard (TV series, 1972–1974)
- The Rivals of Sherlock Holmes (1973)
- Sam (TV series, 1973–1975)
- King Lear (TV serial, 1974)
- The Main Chance (1975)
- Thriller (1975)
- Crown Court (1975)
- Madame Bovary (TV serial, 1975)
- The Hanged Man (TV series, 1975)
- How Green Was My Valley (1975)
- Hunter's Walk (TV series, 1973–1976)
- Operation Daybreak (1976)
- Bill Brand (1976)
- Little Lord Fauntleroy (1976)
- Rogue Male (TV movie, 1976)
- Rooms (TV series, 1977)
- 1990 (episode "Health Farm", 1977)
- Play for Today (2 plays, 1977 and 1980)
- The Sailor's Return (1978)
- The Mill on the Floss (TV serial, 1978)
- The Hills of Heaven (TV serial, 1978)
- Enemy at the Door (1978)
- Target (1 episode, 1978)
- The Beast (TV special, 1979)
- Juliet Bravo (1 episode, 1980)
- Masada (TV miniseries, 1981)
- The Life and Times of David Lloyd George (1981)
- Plays for Pleasure (episode "Like I've Never Been Gone", 1981)
- Maybury (1983)
- We'll Meet Again (TV series, 1982)
- The Citadel (TV movie, 1983)
- Struggle (TV series, 1983)
- Shades of Darkness ("Bewitched" 1983)
- Dempsey and Makepeace (30 episodes, 1985–1986)
- King Lear (1987)
- Three for the Road (1987)
- The District Nurse (episode "Bedside Manners", 1987)
- Babylon Bypassed (1988)
- The Old Devils (TV serial, 1992)

== Bibliography ==
- Anthony and Deborah Hayward TV Unforgettables - Over 250 Legends of the Small Screen, Guinness, 1993
