= Roy Alon =

British stuntman

- Born: 24 April 1942; Otley, West Riding of Yorkshire, England
- Died: 1 February 2006 (age 63); Leeds, Yorkshire, England
- Occupation: Stuntman

Roy Alon (24 April 1942 – 1 February 2006) was a British stuntman.

Born in Otley, West Riding of Yorkshire, during his 36-year career he appeared in over 1,000 films including the James Bond and Superman films. His debut came in A Bridge Too Far.

Roy made the Guinness Book of Records for being the world's most prolific stuntman. He doubled for actors as varied as Peter Sellers and Sophia Loren.

He died of a heart attack at his home in Leeds at the age of 63.

== Filmography ==
=== Film ===
Year	Title	Role	Notes
1977	The Spy Who Loved Me	Russian Sub Crewman	Uncredited
1980	The Long Good Friday	Captain Death	
1983	Superman III	Man Trapped in Car	
1983	Never Say Never Again	Prison Guard Thrown into Sea	Uncredited
1987	The Fourth Protocol	Russian Seaman	
1990	I Bought a Vampire Motorcycle	Harold	
1992	Shining Through	Cook	Uncredited
1992	Blue Ice	Secret Serviceman	Uncredited
1999	The World Is Not Enough	Man in Restaurant	Uncredited
