= Fox (TV series) =

1980 British drama television series

- Genre: Drama
- Written by: Trevor Preston
- Directed by: Jim Goddard
- Starring: Cindy O'Callaghan; Ray Winstone; Larry Lamb; Bernard Hill; Derrick O'Connor
- Country of origin: United Kingdom
- Original language: English
- No. of series: 1
- No. of episodes: 13

Production
- Producer: Verity Lambert
- Running time: 60 minutes
- Production company: Euston Films for Thames Television

Original release
- Network: ITV
- Release: 10 March – 2 June 1980

Fox is a British drama television series produced by Euston Films and Thames Television for the ITV network in 1980. Consisting of thirteen episodes, it recounted the lives of the titular Fox family, who lived in Clapham in South London and had gangland connections. It was notable in that it was an early work that featured the criminal as the protagonist.

The series was written by Trevor Preston, for which he received the 1981 Bafta Television Writers' Award. It was produced by Verity Lambert and directed by Jim Goddard.

Goddard noted that a dominant theme of the show was loyalty.

The show aired on Monday nights, but received fewer viewers than BBC's Yes Minister.

== Plot summary ==
Billy Fox is outwardly a retired Covent Garden market porter, but is involved in crime in London's East End.

== Cast ==
=== The Fox family ===
- Billy – Peter Vaughan
- Connie – Elizabeth Spriggs
- Kenny – Ray Winstone
- Joey – Larry Lamb
- Vin – Bernard Hill
- Ray – Derrick O'Connor
- Phil – Eamon Boland
- Renie – Rosemary Martin
- Andy – Richard Weinbaum
- Nan – Cindy O'Callaghan
- Jenny – Gail Shaw
- Frank – Sidney Livingstone

== List of episodes ==
1. "King Billy"
2. "Arched Fingers for Bach, Flat Fingers for Love"
3. "Pugilism Not Vandalism"
4. "It's All Them Psychia-Whatever-You-Call-It Books He Reads"
5. "Shim-Me-Sha-Wabble"
6. "Stick or Twist"
7. "The Perfect Scapegoat Syndrome"
8. "'If It's Good Enough for New Orleans, It's Good Enough for Clapham"
9. "Fox Big 'F' – Family"
10. "Just an Iron Monkey"
11. "Just Another Villain in a Cheap Suit"
12. "Oh Dear – Oh Dear – Oh Dear!"
13. "The Family ... and the Future"

== Awards ==
- 1981 Bafta Television Writers' Award for Trevor Preston
