= Ranald Graham =

Scottish writer, producer and director (1941–2010)

- Born: Ranald Ian MacKenzie Graham; 3 January 1941; Sandakan, North Borneo
- Died: 29 August 2010 (aged 69)
- Occupations: Screenwriter, director, producer

Ranald Ian Mackenzie Graham (3 January 1941 – 29 August 2010) was a Scottish writer, director and producer, best known for his writing work on the British television series The Sweeney, The Professionals and Dempsey and Makepeace.

== Early life ==
Graham was born in Sandakan, North Borneo (now Sabah) on 3 January 1941 to Scottish parents. Just over a year later, on 19 January 1942, the Japanese landed at Sandakan as part of the invasion of Borneo that had commenced on 16 December 1941 when the Japanese took Miri and Seria in Sarawak. For the first few months the European civilians were interned in various private houses in Sandakan; in May 1942 they were transferred to the prison camp on Berhala Island in Sandakan Harbour. Here Graham, his older sister Sheena and their mother were separated from their father. After eight months, the women and children were sent from Berhala Island to Batu Lintang camp in Kuching, Sarawak arriving at the camp after a nine-day difficult sea journey on 21 January 1943. Graham's father arrived in Kuching some six weeks later. Batu Lintang was to be Graham's home for the next two years and nine months.

One of the female internees at Batu Lintang, Hilda Bates, recorded her thoughts about Graham in her account of her internment:

My favourite [of the 35 children in the camp] was Ronald [sic]; a tough three-year old, and quite the naughtiest child in the camp! He possessed an angelic face, wavy golden hair, large blue eyes with long lashes, and an attractive Scottish accent. This little wretch often escaped punishment for his crimes, simply because of his appearance, and the artless gaze of his big blue eyes when being pulled up! When his mother was ill, Ronald was left in my care, and whenever he became too naughty, I would say "Now, bend over, Ronald!" As I then produced a small cane, prepared to whack him, he would turn his head and give me such an appealing look, saying: “Oh Batesie, you wouldn't, would you?” And I would end by giving him just a tiny smack!

The camp was liberated on 11 September 1945, and after a period of recuperation on Labuan Island the Graham family returned to the UK. His parents eventually returned to Sandakan, but Graham remained in the UK, to be educated at Gordonstoun and later at Trinity College, Dublin, where he studied English and was a keen member of the drama society. He then undertook an MA in contemporary literature at Birmingham University.

== Career ==
=== Writing and producing ===
Graham began his writing career in 1966 when his play Aberfan, Or How The Abnormally High Welsh Rainfalls and the Amazingly High Scottish Wind Pressure Brought About A Dislocation of Scottish And Welsh Responsibilities (or more succinctly, Aberfan) was performed at the Traverse Theatre, Edinburgh as part of the Edinburgh Festival Fringe. The play interwove the stories of two disasters: the Aberfan colliery disaster and the Tay Bridge disaster, was performed mainly by children and received a rave notice in The Scotsman. His second play An Expedition to Pick Mushrooms was staged in 1967, also at the Traverse Theatre.

In 1968 Graham became a researcher and writer for the television sports documentary series Sports Arena, which was presented by Michael Parkinson.

In 1974 Graham wrote the screenplay for the horror film Shanks, directed by "Hollywood B-movie veteran" William Castle and starring Marcel Marceau. It was "generally acknowledged as the weirdest project ever to emerge from a major studio" and was critically panned. The next year Graham co-wrote a television movie, Strange New World and started to make his career in crime dramas, writing for The Sweeney. In all, he contributed six episodes between 1975–78: "Queen's Pawn", "Cover Story", "Supersnout", "Thou Shalt Not Kill" (all 1975), "Lady Luck" (1976) and "Nightmare" (1978).

Graham was chosen as the screenwriter of the first film spin-off of the series, Sweeney!, which was released in 1977. The film's producer Ted Childs commented: “I felt that he had a cinematic understanding that not all television writers had ... It needed to have a larger than life quality, which Ranald was able to bring to it."

Graham went on to write for The Professionals, contributing five episodes between 1978 and 1982: "Blind Run" and "Fall Girl" (both 1978), "Wild Justice" (1980), "Operation Susie" and "Lawson's Last Stand" (both 1982).

The Professionals saw Graham at his most abrasive: the elite CI5 crime-fighting squad used bad language and wildly underhand methods. Bodie and Doyle were hard, gritty and unlovable. But the public watched in their millions. Graham explored the tension between Bodie and Doyle perfectly and then played them off against Jackson's more benign – but equally hard – supremo. Graham's scripts brought an unerring earthiness that equally shocked and entertained.

In 1980 Graham revisited the horror genre, writing an episode of Hammer House of Horror, "The Two Faces of Evil".

This work was followed by the screenplay for Breakout, a film for the Children's Film and Television Foundation in 1983, and three episodes for the Australian version of The Professionals, Special Squad: "The Golden Run" and "Child of Fortune" (both 1984) and "Wild Man" (1985).

In 1985 London Weekend Television asked Graham to create the television crime drama series Dempsey and Makepeace. He scripted the opening episode and wrote a further six episodes over its three series run: "Armed and Extremely Dangerous", "Silver Dollar", "Tequila Sunrise", "The Bogeyman" (all 1985), "The Burning Part 1", "The Burning Part 2" and "Guardian Angel" (all 1986). He also acted as series consultant, and for the third series, as producer. Scorpio, a projected series about an international anti-terrorist squad that was "announced in a blaze of glory" in 1986, was never made.

In 1990 Graham produced Yellowthread Street, a big budget police series set and filmed in Hong Kong and made by Yorkshire Television. Graham's last television work was an appearance as himself in a television documentary about the depiction of police in television dramas, Top of the Cops.

=== Directing ===
"An able theatre director", Graham directed an adaptation of Jean Cocteau's Opium in 1970 at the Dublin Theatre Festival and the Hampstead Theatre. In 1998 he co-directed Claude Harz's Maggie and Delaney with Penny Cherns at London's Rosemary Branch Theatre.

=== Sport ===
Graham was a keen sports enthusiast, from his Gordonstoun days onwards. His sporting interests included watching boxing, Scottish rugby and English cricket. He directed a London Weekend Television documentary on squash player Jonah Barrington, with whom he had been at university. In 2000, he was a technical consultant on the movie Snatch, advising on the boxing scenes, and in 2005 he co-wrote with its subject the biography of the boxer Joe Egan, titled Big Joe Egan, the Toughest White Man on the Planet.

== Personal life ==
Graham was "gregarious, a lovely teller of tales". He married (and divorced) twice. His first wife was Judy Monahan, with whom he had a son, Seorais; his second wife was Carolyn Trayler, with whom he had two daughters, Skye and Georgia. Graham died of motor neurone disease on 29 August 2010.

== Works ==
=== Film ===
- Shanks (1974) screenwriter
- Sweeney! (1977) screenwriter
- Breakout (1983) screenwriter
- Snatch (2000) technical consultant (for the boxing)

=== Television ===
- Sports Arena (1968) writer, researcher
- Strange New World (TV movie) (1975) screenwriter, executive producer
- The Sweeney (1975–78) writer
- The Professionals (1978–1982) writer
- Hammer House of Horror (1980) writer
- Special Squad (1984–1985) writer
- Dempsey and Makepeace (1985–1986) creator, writer, producer and series consultant
- Yellowthread Street (1990) producer
- Top of the Cops (2009) documentary, contributor as himself

=== Theatre ===
- Aberfan, Or How The Abnormally High Welsh Rainfalls and the Amazingly High Scottish Wind Pressure Brought About A Dislocation of Scottish And Welsh Responsibilities (1966) writer
- An Expedition to Pick Mushrooms (1967) writer

=== Books ===
- Big Joe Egan, the Toughest White Man on the Planet (2005) co-written with Joe Egan
- "Last Train", contribution to London, City of Disappearances by Iain Sinclair (2007), 588–590
