= John Kershaw (writer) =

British screenwriter and script editor

John Hugh d'Allenger Kershaw (2 August 1931- 2 December 1993) was a British screenwriter and script editor. He edited the entire first season of the television program Bergerac, and contributed to other series, including Callan, Armchair Theatre, Special Branch, Armchair Cinema, Z Cars and The Bill and .

== Biography ==
Kershaw was the only son- there being also a daughter- of Leslie Walter Kershaw (1904-1979), a confectionery shop proprietor of King's Lynn, Norfolk, formerly of Thanet, Kent, and of Lincolnshire (where the Kershaw family were established as blacksmiths), and his first wife Mabel (1908-1969), daughter of Frederick d'Allenger, a soldier who died whilst posted in Malta. Kershaw was sometimes credited under his pen name "Hugh d'Allenger", his middle names. He was educated at Lincoln Cathedral School, and as an external student at the University of London. Kershaw was married to Olwen (née Earle); they lived at Teddington, Middlesex.

== Career ==
Kershaw was a lecturer in literature for adult education classes at the University of London from 1961 to 1964. He was script editor of the American Broadcasting Company's TV arts programme Tempo from 1964 to 1967, script editor of the television series Callan from 1968 to 1969, and producer and editor of Thames Television's Armchair Theatre series of plays from 1969 to 1971. A novelist, literary critic, poet, and essayist, his publications include The Present Stage (Fontana, 1966); Fanfare the orchestra (Chappells', 1970), and George and the Dragonfly (Argo, 1970); he was a contributor to Macdonald's Illustrated Library, The Jewish Chronicle, New Society, Queen Magazine, and Encounter. He co-created and was the original writer for the children's TV show Rainbow, between 1972 and 1981. Kershaw was a member of the Society of Authors and the Writers' Guild of Great Britain. and Alongside Shawn Randall and Ellen Shepard, Kershaw was awarded the Golden Raspberry Award for Worst Screenplay for the 1983 film The Lonely Lady directed by Peter Sasdy and starring Pia Zadora, based on the 1976 novel by Harold Robbins. The film's production was troubled; initially aimed for release in 1976 with different screenwriters (Robert Merrill and Dean Riesner) and lead actress (Susan Blakely), production eventually began in 1982 as a Meshulam Riklis-funded vehicle for his wife, Zadora.

Kershaw's later work included creating the 36-episode 1984 drama series Miracles Take Longer, depicting the activities of the Citizens Advice Bureau, and writing twelve episodes of the Children's ITV series (produced by Thames Television) C.A.B. (so named because- coincidentally- the junk shop was a former Citizens Advice Bureau) from 1988 to 1989, as well as three episodes of the police procedural series The Bill in 1984, 1989 and 1990, one of which was adapted in 1994 as an episode of the German version of The Bill, Die Wache.

Kershaw died on 2 December 1993 in Atkinson Morleys Hospital, Wimbledon, London from a intracranial hemorrhage.
