= Trevor Preston =

British screenwriter (1938–2018)

Trevor Preston (1938–2018) was a British screenwriter. He wrote the series Out and created the series Ace of Wands. He also wrote a 1976 TV movie adaptation of James and the Giant Peach. in 1981 he received the Bafta Television Writers' Award for the TV series Fox.

== Biography ==
Trevor Preston was born in Erith, Kent, on the 12 July 1938. Preston was the second of four children of Phyllis (nee Parker), a teacher, and Robert Preston, a soldier who had fought in both World War One and World War Two. Preston studied at the Royal College of Art in London.

Preston's television career began when the ITV arts show Tempo requested if the RCA’s film and television design department would produce an episode for the show. Preston directed the episode "The Medium Sized Cage" for Tempo. He later worked on Tempo as a researcher.

== Writing credits ==
=== 1960s work ===
1966

- Four People (serial) (2 episodes)

1967

- The Lion, the Witch and the Wardrobe (serial) (adaptation - 10 episodes)
- The Pilgrim's Progress (serial) (adaptation - 3 episodes)

1968

- Freewheelers (series) (writer - 4 episodes)
- The Tyrant King (series) (6 episodes)

1969

- The Incredible Adventures of Professor Branestawm (series) (adaptation - 7 episodes)

=== 1970s work ===
1971

- The Mind of Mr. J.G. Reeder (series) (dramatised by - 1 episode)
- Public Eye (series) (by - 1 episode)

1972

- Callan (series) (by - 2 episodes, 1970–1972) (writer - 1 episode, 1969)
- Ace of Wands (series) (creator - 46 episodes, 1970–1972) (writer - 3 episodes, 1970)

1973

- Love Story (series) (writer - 1 episode)
- Special Branch (series) (by - 3 episodes, 1969–1973) (writer - 1 episode, 1970)
- The Protectors (series) (writer - 5 episodes)

1974

- The Aweful Mr. Goodall (series) (writer - 1 episode)
- Rooms (series) (written by - 2 episodes)

1975

- Six Days of Justice (series) (writer - 3 episodes, 1972–1975) (screenplay - 1 episode, 1973)
- Couples (series) (writer - 4 episodes)

1976

- James and the Giant Peach (TV Movie) (adapted by)

1978

- Out (series) (written by - 6 episodes)
- Premiere (series) (writer - 1 episode)
- The Sweeney (series) (1 episode, 1974) (written by - 11 episodes, 1975–1978
- Hazell (TV Series) (writer - 2 episodes)

1979

- The Dick Francis Thriller: The Racing Game (series) (written by - 1 episode)

=== 1980s work ===
1980

- Fox (series) (written by - 13 episodes, for which Preston received the 1981 Bafta Television Writers' Award)

1983

- Slayground (writer)

1984

- Minder (series) (written by - 1 episode)
- Dramarama (series) (by - 1 episode)

1985

- Bones

1987

- Billy the Kid and the Green Baize Vampire (feature film)

=== 1990s work ===
1990

- Screen Two (series) (writer - 1 episode)

1993

- Thicker Than Water (TV Movie)

1994

- The Negotiator (TV Movie)
- Ruth Rendell Mysteries (series) (adaptation - 4 episodes, 1990–1994) (writer - 2 episodes, 1992–1994) (screenplay - 1 episode, 1989)

1998

- Little White Lies (TV Movie)

=== 2000s work ===
2000

- The Secret Adventures of Jules Verne (series) (screenplay - 2 episodes)

2003

- I'll Sleep When I'm Dead (written by)
