= Duncan Browne =

English singer-songwriter

- Browne, c. 1979

Background information
- Born: 25 March 1947
- Origin: England
- Died: 28 May 1993 (aged 46)
- Genres: Rock; pop; folk; soft rock; art rock
- Occupations: Musician; singer-songwriter; composer
- Instruments: Vocals; guitar; bass guitar; keyboards
- Years active: 1967–1993
- Labels: Immediate; Sire; Rak
- Formerly of: Lorel; Metro

Duncan John Browne (25 March 1947 – 28 May 1993) was an English singer-songwriter and musician. His debut album, Give Me Take You, was released by Immediate Records in 1968. Its 1973 follow-up, Duncan Browne, spawned a minor UK hit single "Journey" and has garnered cult status among fans of 1970s folk rock. Browne formed the art rock band Metro with Peter Godwin and Sean Lyons in 1976, before resuming his solo career.

== Early life ==
Browne was born on 25 March 1947, the only child of Air Commodore C. D. A. Browne. He studied at Worksop College where he excelled at drama and at the clarinet. His ambition to emulate his father's career in the Royal Air Force was thwarted when he was rejected on the grounds of ill health.

== Career ==
Browne attended the London Academy of Music and Dramatic Art, studying both music theory and drama. He chose to become a musician when, in 1967, he met Andrew Loog Oldham, and signed with his Immediate Records label. His debut album Give Me Take You was issued in 1968.

His choral arrangement was used on the Tim Hardin penned "Hang on to a Dream" on the album Nice, as recorded by the Nice in 1969.

Browne's biggest hit in the UK was the song "Journey" (UK number 23), and was televised on Top of the Pops in 1972. The song was included on Browne's second album Duncan Browne in 1973.

In 1976, Browne formed the band Metro with Peter Godwin and released the album Metro (1977). In 1978, he left Metro and resumed his solo career, releasing the two solo albums The Wild Places and Streets of Fire. The song "The Wild Places" was a hit single in the Netherlands in 1979 where its highest position was number 7 on the Dutch top 40. From the same period, "Criminal World", co-written by Browne with Peter Godwin, was recorded by David Bowie on his 1983 Let's Dance album.

In 1984–85, Browne composed and performed the music for the British television series Travelling Man, in collaboration with the programme's producer Sebastian Graham-Jones. The soundtrack was released on vinyl and CD. The track reached number 68 on the UK Singles Chart in December 1984.

Browne also composed "Salva Me", the theme tune of the BBC series Shadow of the Noose in 1989, and it appeared on a compilation album with 19 other television theme tunes.

In 1989, Browne was diagnosed with cancer, and a recurrence led to his death in 1993, aged 46. An unfinished solo album was completed by friends and colleagues, including Sebastian Graham-Jones and Nick Magnus. Songs of Love & War was posthumously released in 1995 and was described as "a fine album exploring pretty much the same musical universe as Browne's solo productions from the late '70s."

== Discography ==
=== Studio albums ===
- Give Me Take You (1968)
- Duncan Browne (1973)
- The Wild Places (1978)
- Streets of Fire (1979)
- Songs of Love & War (1995)

=== Singles ===
- "On the Bombsite" / "Alfred Bell" (1968)
- "Who Is Julie" (1969)
- "Resurrection Joe" / "The Final Asylum" (1970)
- "Journey" / "In a Mist" (1972)
- "Send Me the Bill for Your Friendship" / "My Only Son" (1973)
- "The Wild Places" / "Camino Real (Parts 2 & 3)" (1978)
- "American Heartbeat" / "(Restless) Child of Change" (1979)
- "American Heartbeat" / "She's Just a Fallen Angel" (1979)
- "Fauvette" / "Streets of Fire (Extract)" (1979)
- "Niña morena" / "Fauvette" (1979)
- "Theme from Travelling Man" / "Andrea's Theme" (1984)
- "The Wild Places '91" / "Fauvette" (1991)

=== Compilation albums ===
- Compilation (1982)
- Planet Earth (1986)
- Selection (1991)
- The Wild Places / Streets of Fire (2000)
- Journey: The Anthology 1967–1993 (2004)
- Best of Duncan Browne: Greatest Hits (2004)
- Planet Earth: The Transatlantic/Logo Years 1976-1979 (2017)
- Jigsaw (2026)

=== Soundtracks ===
- Travelling Man – The Music from the Granada TV series (1985)
