= Images of Heaven =

Images of Heaven may refer to:

- Images of Heaven (EP), a 1982 EP by Peter Godwin, or the title track
- Images of Heaven: The Best of Peter Godwin, 1998
