= The Wild Places (Duncan Browne album) =

Studio album by Duncan Browne
- Released: September 1978
- Genre: Rock; progressive rock; synthpop
- Length: 40:52
- Label: Logo; Sire
- Producer: Duncan Browne

Duncan Browne chronology
Duncan Browne (1973)	The Wild Places (1978)	Streets of Fire (1979)

The Wild Places is the third studio album by English singer-songwriter and musician Duncan Browne. Released in 1978 through Logo and Sire Records, it is Browne's first solo album since his departure from the band Metro that year, and features contributions from session musicians Tony Hymas, John Giblin and Simon Phillips. In contrast to his previous self-titled solo record, the sound of the album is fully electric and ranges from progressive rock to straightforward rock music and synthpop.

The record achieved moderate commercial success. It has been long out of print in the United States and was reissued during late 2000 in Japan.

== Critical reception ==
Professional ratings
Review scores
Source	Rating
AllMusic	3/5 stars
The New Rolling Stone Album Guide	2/5 stars

In their 1979 review, Billboard described the record as "sophisticated and sensitive," writing that Browne's percussion playing in addition to his guitar work adds a good balance. The review concludes: "Browne sings cosmopolitan songs of sex, love and sensations, not yet jaded but getting there." Nevertheless, The New Rolling Stone Album Guide critic Dave Marsh criticised the record and its successor, Streets of Fire (1979), dismissing them as "synthesizer pop that hardly lives up to the promise of the album titles." Marsh further wrote: "Fire and wild- ness, not to mention human passion, is just what this mechanical marvel [Browne] lacks."

In a retrospective review, AllMusic critic Bruce Eder was positive in his assessment of the album, comparing it to "a lost Roxy Music album, or perhaps a lost Bryan Ferry record." Eder further stated that "the music has a sense of drama as well as beautiful melodies that were even better realized, with lush contributions on the synthesizer and related keyboards" and concluded: "Duncan Browne was at the top of his game, as both a singer and composer, working in an introspective, romantic vein."

== Track listing ==
All tracks are written by Duncan Browne, except where noted.

1. "The Wild Places" – 5:55
2. "Roman Vécu" – 4:43
3. "Camino Real, Part I, Part II, Part III" (Browne, Giblin, Thomas, Hymas) – 8:30
4. "Samurai" (Peter Godwin) – 4:25
5. "Kisarazu" – 7:10
6. "The Crash" – 3:53
7. "Planet Earth" (Godwin) – 6:15

2000 Japan reissue bonus tracks

8. "Fauvette" – 3:53
9. "American Heartbeat" – 3:37
10. "She's Just a Fallen Angel" – 5:10
11. "Streets of Fire" – 8:08
12. "Nina Morena" – 4:57
13. "Things To Come" – 5:51
14. "(Restless) Child of Change" (Godwin) – 3:35

== Personnel ==
Album personnel as adapted from album liner notes.

- Duncan Browne – lead vocals, electric guitar, acoustic guitar, percussion, production, backing vocals; keyboards (5)
- Tony Hymas – synthesizer
- John Giblin – fretless bass
- Simon Phillips – drums, percussion; piano (3)

== Charts ==
Chart (1979)	Peak position
Australia (Kent Music Report)	67
US Billboard Top LPs & Tape	174
