= Mitch (TV series) =

British crime drama television series (1984)

- Genre: Crime drama
- Created by: Roger Marshall; Donald Zec
- Written by: Various
- Directed by: Don Leaver; Peter Cregeen; Terry Green; Gerry Mill
- Starring: John Thaw; David Calder; Clare Higgins; Gawn Grainger; Philippa Urquhart; Eileen Nicholas; John Golightly; Jon Croft
- Composer: John Dankworth
- Country of origin: United Kingdom
- Original language: English
- No. of series: 1
- No. of episodes: 10

Production
- Executive producer: John Davies
- Producer: Peter Cregeen
- Production locations: Fleet Street, London, England, UK
- Editors: Clayton Parker; Graham Sisson; Richard MacQueen
- Running time: 53 minutes
- Production company: LWT

Original release
- Network: ITV
- Release: 31 August – 2 November 1984

Mitch is a British crime-drama miniseries written and created by Roger Marshall and Donald Zec. The show starred John Thaw, David Calder and Clare Higgins. It was produced by LWT for one series and ten episodes and aired on the ITV network between 31 August and 2 November 1984.

== Plot ==
The series follows Tom Mitchell (John Thaw), a grizzled copper who has slowed down the pace since his action-packed days in The Sweeney for the title role in this London Weekend Television series about a Fleet Street crime reporter and the stories he covers. Tom Mitchell had left his wife and moved in with a social worker – who seemed to do most of her social work trying to keep Mitch off the Scotch. Mitch was tough, honourable and intelligent – respected by his fellows and full of his own principles. He also had a soft heart and a good relationship with the police.

== Cast ==
- John Thaw as Tom “Mitch” Mitchell
- David Calder as Ben Hall
- Clare Higgins as Jo
- Gawn Grainger as Jerry Nicholson
- Philippa Urquhart as Susan
- Eileen Nicholas as Joyce Barlow
- John Golightly as Detective Inspector. Jack Howitt
- Jon Croft as Forsyth Galletly

== Episodes ==
No.	Title	Directed by	Written by	Original release date
1	"Something Private"	Peter Cregeen	Roger Marshall	31 August 1984
Mitch investigates the disappearance of a ten-year old boy.
2	"Sleeping Dogs"	Peter Cregeen	Jeremy Burnham	7 September 1984
A tip from a friend leads Mitch to a deserted part of Luton airport and the unscheduled arrival of a flight from Warsaw.
3	"Business as Usual"	Don Leaver	Roger Marshall	14 September 1984
Following a raid in a jewellery shop, reporters flock to the scene of the crime.
4	"Who Must Remain Anonymous"	Don Leaver	Roger Marshall	21 September 1984
Elderly residents of South London are being intimidated by young criminals, most of whom are black. Mitch writes an article - and creates a storm.
5	"Fit Up"	Terry Green	Tony Hoare	28 September 1984
A young petty criminal, Freddy Lawson is saved from prison sentence following his conviction for a minor theft. Two 'bent coppers' intent to blackmail him.
6	"Squealer"	Don Leaver	Roger Marshall	5 October 1984
Crime reporter Mitch is asked for help by the wife of ex-convict Reg Grey - arrested for a crime committed three years ago.
7	"Postman's Knock"	Terry Green	Roger Marshall	12 October 1984
Four armed men attack security guards carrying wages into a hospital.
8	"Saturday Night"	Gerry Mill	Roger Marshall	19 October 1984
Jo remembers that she's forgotten to give Mitch a message from his editor.
9	"A Family Matter"	Don Leaver	Willis Hall	26 October 1984
Mitch gives a young man and his girlfriend a lift in his car.
10	"The Nature of the Beast"	Gerry Mill	Donald Zec & Anthony Fowles	2 November 1984
When Mitch is contacted by a violent right-wing group, he decides to write a detailed expose of the Neo-Nazi organisation.

== Production ==
The series was shot on location in London around 18 months of filming in 1983, it wasn't broadcast until August 1984.

== Home media ==
The complete series was released on DVD by Network in a three-disc set on 17 September 2007.
