= Streets of Fire (Duncan Browne album) =

Studio album by Duncan Browne
- Released: October 1979
- Genre: Rock; art rock; synthpop
- Length: 39:11
- Label: Logo; Sire
- Producer: Duncan Browne

Duncan Browne chronology
The Wild Places (1978)	Streets of Fire (1979)	Music from the Travelling Man (1985)

Streets of Fire is the fourth studio album by English singer-songwriter and musician Duncan Browne. It was released in 1978 through Logo and Sire Records. The album features contributions from saxophone player Dick Morrissey, as well as previous contributors Tony Hymas and John Giblin. The record retains Browne's distinguishable art rock influences while muting and subsuming the progressive rock elements of the preceding record, The Wild Places (1978), to its synthesizer work.

Streets of Fire achieved moderate commercial success. It was reissued on CD in Japan in 2000.

== Critical reception ==
Professional ratings
Review scores
Source	Rating
AllMusic	3/5 stars
The New Rolling Stone Album Guide	1/5 stars

At the time of its release, Billboard magazine regarded the record as "an interesting followup to Browne's 1978 hit album The Wild Places," due to "his self-penned tunes and musical ability." Nevertheless, Billboard also criticized the "mixed down vocals," deeming Browne's vocals as "worth hearing". Nevertheless, The New Rolling Stone Album Guide critic Dave Marsh panned the record and its predecessor, dismissing them as "synthesizer pop that hardly lives up to the promise of the album titles." Marsh further wrote: "Fire and wildness, not to mention human passion, is just what this mechanical marvel [Browne] lacks."

In a retrospective review, AllMusic's Bruce Eder wrote that "the album's first half was even better than its predecessor, with its music easily accommodating his melodies and a rocking beat," describing it as "some of the prettiest music of his career". Nevertheless, Eder thought that the side two was "slightly less engaging and had fewer memorable melodies."

== Track listing ==
All songs are written by Duncan Browne, except "(Restless) Child of Change" by Peter Godwin. "Nina Morena" features lines from Pablo Neruda poem "En Su Llama Mortal".

1. "Fauvette" – 3:54
2. "American Heartbeat" – 3:39
3. "She's Just a Fallen Angel" – 5:08
4. "Streets of Fire" – 8:09
5. "Nina Morena" – 4:56
6. "Things to Come" – 5:52
7. "(Restless) Child of Change" – 3:35
8. "Canción de Cuna: Street Echoes (for M.)" – 3:58

== Personnel ==
Album personnel as adapted from album liner notes.

- Duncan Browne – vocals, guitar, production
- Tony Hymas – keyboards
- John Giblin – bass guitar
- Simon Phillips – drums, percussion
- Dick Morrissey – alto saxophone (3)
- Dennis Weinreich – engineering
- Ray Hendriksen – engineering
- Jean Luke Epstein – graphics
- Vince Loden – photography
