= List of Public Eye episodes =

Public Eye is a British television drama series that ran from 1965 to 1975, a total of 87 episodes were produced over a run of seven series over the course of ten years. The first three series were produced by ABC Television, and the remaining four series were produced by Thames Television. The series was created by Roger Marshall and Anthony Marriott, and it deals with an enquiry agent Frank Marker (Alfred Burke) who handles various cases and investigations through the course of the series.

== Series overview ==
Series	Episodes	Originally released	
Series	Episodes	First released	Last released
1	15	23 January 1965	1 May 1965
2	13	2 July 1966	24 September 1966
3	13	20 January 1968	13 April 1968
4	7	30 July 1969	10 September 1969
5	13	7 July 1971	29 September 1971
6	13	8 November 1972	14 February 1973
7	13	6 January 1975	7 April 1975

=== Series 1 (1965) ===
The first series was set in London, and premiered on ABC Television on the 23 January 1965; although at the time the series was not given a network broadcast across the ITV Network, since at the time the regional companies were given the freedom to broadcast programmes at different dates or choose not to take up the show at all. Only Southern Television and Ulster Television broadcast this series at the same time as ABC, while this series was broadcast later the same year by Associated Television, Border, Channel, Grampian, Scottish Television, Tyne Tees, TWW and Westward. Just one episode, i.e. The Morning Wasn't So Hot, was shown by Teledu Cymru, while the series was not taken up by Anglia. At fifteen episodes long the series has the longest run of the seven series that were produced, though due to the archival policies at the time many of the episodes from this series were junked or lost, and today only two episodes are currently known to survive in the archives. Initially the episode "The Morning Wasn't So Hot" was slated to be the opening episode, but in the end ABC replaced with "All For a Couple of Ponies" instead, and the former episode was broadcast later on in the series.

No. overall	No. in series	Title	Directed by	Written by	Archival Status	Original release date
1	1	"All for a Couple of Ponies"	Kim Mills	Roger Marshall	Missing	23 January 1965
Marker finds himself arrested on suspicion of stealing cameras when attempting to track down a van he has been sent to repossess. Marker attempts to defeat the private detective hating D.S. Leith's attempts to nail him for the theft and get released so he can track down Joey Stone, who is responsible for the camera thefts and has taken the van.
2	2	"Nobody Kills Santa Claus"	Kim Mills	Roger Marshall	Exists	30 January 1965
Eric Hart hires Marker to find out who is blackmailing young businessman Paul Garston, intending for Marker to serve as a bodyguard for Garston under the guise of his chauffeur. Marker finds out that Garston has many enemies, possibly including Ray Johnson, the wife of Anne who is having an affair with Garston.
3	3	"They Go Off in the End - Like Fruit"	Robert Tronson	Martin Worth	Missing	6 February 1965
Marker is sent to track down Judy Manning to repossess her car, with Manning having left her London home to return to her childhood village in Hampshire. Marker finds Judy and returns to London with her, discovering the terms of the hire purchase agreement for Judy's car are dishonest, with her standing to lose possession of the car even if the loan is repaid.
4	4	"Dig You Later"	Kim Mills	Roger Marshall	Missing	13 February 1965
Inspector Ted Barry's daughter Anne has disappeared and Ted hires Marker to find her, anxious that her disappearance does not become known to his police colleagues. Marker's search for her takes him into London's underworld, with Jay Walker and his boss Paul Brooks exploiting Anne to get her addicted to drugs.
5	5	"I Went to Borrow a Pencil and Look What I Found"	Jonathan Alwyn	Terence Frisby	Missing	20 February 1965
Toy designer Colin Reynolds hires Marker to find out who his wife Sheila is having an affair with but only wants a name. When he finds out Sheila is having an affair with his superior Raymond Franks, Colin reports the affair to company boss Paggot and is promoted in Franks' place before hiring Marker again, hoping to blackmail Paggot into giving him a directorship.
6	6	"But the Joneses Never Get Letters"	Laurence Bourne	William Emms	Missing	27 February 1965
Black man Paul Obukwe and white girl Marion Hordern marry, but Marion's father Arthur receives poison pen letters alleging that Paul is abusing Marion. Arthur hires Marker to find out who's sending the letters. Though the letters are untrue, Marker finds Paul and Marion's marriage is not a happy one as he searches for the letter writer.
7	7	"A Harsh World for Zealots"	Laurence Bourne	Michael Cahill	Missing	6 March 1965
Bookshop assistant Arthur Gates falls out with owner Gregory Chambers and leaves, resenting not being made an equal partner. Marker, having originally been hired on a separate matter by Chambers is asked to find out what Gates is up to. It transpires Gates had stolen a rare Latin book when he left and is attempting to use money from its sale to start his own business.
8	8	"And a Very Fine Fiddle Has He"	Laurence Bourne	Robert Holmes	Missing	13 March 1965
Solicitor Donald Halston hires Marker to find out who is blackmailing estate agent Robert Spanier, who has political ambitions and used an escort to fake evidence of an affair in order to get divorced. As Marker tries to find the blackmailer, he learns that Robert's ex-wife Judith and brother-in-law Hubert are happy to see him suffer and may be connected with the blackmail.
9	9	"My Life, That's a Marriage"	Kim Mills	Michael Hastings	Missing	20 March 1965
Alice Benjamin hires Marker to look for her missing husband George, who has not been seen for ten weeks. Alice paints a picture of a happy marriage to Marker, who finds out this story is at odds with everyone else's recollection of their relationship. It eventually transpires George is in prison for contempt of court and Marker must get Alice to face the truth.
10	10	"You Think It'll Be Marvellous - But It's Always a Rabbit"	Mark Lawton	Robert Holmes	Missing	27 March 1965
Footballer Jimmy Sale is run over by a stolen car and he hires Marker to find who was responsible, frustrated with apparent police inaction after three weeks. The car belonged to Sue and Colin Jefferson, but as Marker finds out, they along with D.S. Wimpole, the policeman investigating the case may be more closely connected with the accident than is first apparent.
11	11	"Protection is a Man's Best Friend"	Laurence Bourne	Mike Watts	Missing	3 April 1965
Marker is being threatened by ageing gangster Pete Shoemaker's right-hand man 'Bubbles' Kiley for helping bookmaker Ben Heuston who they're trying to extort. Shoemaker's two children are then kidnapped and he hires Marker to find them, forcing him to ask uncomfortable questions of Heuston while Kiley continues to make trouble for the both of them.
12	12	"The Morning Wasn't So Hot"	Kim Mills	Roger Marshall	Exists	10 April 1965
Yorkshire teenager Jenny Graham runs away to London and is groomed into becoming a prostitute by pimp Peter Mason. Marker is hired by solicitor Drummond to find Jenny and bring her home. However, Jenny has left Mason and is attempting to use prostitution as her way to wealth, unaware that agent Dannon is trying to buy her from Mason.
13	13	"You Should Hear Me Eat Soup"	Patrick Dromgoole	Terence Frisby	Missing	17 April 1965
As Marker attempts to leave London to escape the wrath of horse doper 'Happy' Holliday, he is hired to travel to the England-Wales border to help the Countess of Llandwyr and Gwylraith stop her son Lord Timothy Trepolwyn from marrying working class girl Sonia. Marker soon realizes Sonia is a gold-digger and that Holliday has also travelled to the nearby area.
14	14	"You Have to Draw the Line Somewhere"	Toby Robertson	Martin Worth	Missing	24 April 1965
John Fordyce hires Marker to investigate Harry Lawford on behalf of Harry's wife Jean, suspecting that Harry may be having an affair. Marker finds out that Harry is in a homosexual relationship with a man called Pat, a revelation that shocks Jean, while Harry fears that if his secret gets out, his career will be jeopardized.
15	15	"Have It on the House"	Guy Verney	Roger Marshall	Missing	1 May 1965
Reggie Dorning, a conman posing as a major is scamming military widows out of their money. One of his victims, Mrs. Worboys hires Marker to track him down. Marker finds Dorning in Bournemouth continuing to practice his con and learns he is wanted by the police. Ensuring Dorning faces justice is complicated by a journalist who wants to capture Marker serving Dorning with a summons.

=== Series 2 (1966) ===
For the second series, the setting changed to Birmingham as Marker is forced to move operations as London becomes increasingly unaffordable for him. This change in location was in part motivated by ABC's drive to produce more of their shows in the Midlands, at their studios in Aston, near Birmingham. Only Ulster simultaneously broadcast this series at the same time as ABC, other ITV companies such as Anglia, Border, Grampian, Associated-Rediffusion, Southern and Tyne Tees transmitted the series a day earlier, while Channel, Scottish Television, TWW and Westward started transmitting the series later in July or in August. Teledu Cymru only showed five episodes of Series 2. This series is slightly shorter than the previous, a total of thirteen episodes were produced. Likewise with the previous series, only two episodes are currently known to survive from this series, although audio recordings for the last five episodes have been recovered.

No. overall	No. in series	Title	Directed by	Written by	Archival Status	Original release date
16	1	"All the Black Dresses She Wants"	Kim Mills	Martin Worth	Missing	2 July 1966
Marker travels to Birmingham on behalf of builder Steve Burrell who wants him to find out if foreman Joe Lodge is faking paralysis after suffering a workplace accident where he fell off a ladder. Burrell is also having an affair with Joe's wife Liz. After completing the case, Marker, having been priced out of London decides to move to Birmingham permanently.
17	2	"Don't Forget You're Mine"	Kim Mills	Roger Marshall	Exists	9 July 1966
Marker moves into his new office in Birmingham and takes on his first case, where housewife Mrs Jessup wants him to find her missing husband Donald. Marker finds that Donald is now living in a relationship with Karen Scott, but is unaware he is helping Mrs Jessup to harass the pair, forcing him to look for Karen once she decides to leave, having had enough of Jessup's harassment.
18	3	"I Could Set It to Music"	Basil Coleman	Julian Bond	Missing	16 July 1966
After receiving a photo of salesman Hugh Clayton allegedly having an affair with fellow employee Ann Maitland, chairman James Birch asks Marker to use the photo to get Clayton to resign. Marker must find out the truth when Clayton claims the affair with Ann ended four years ago, contrary to the claim the photo was taken two weeks ago.
19	4	"It's a Terrible Way to Be"	Guy Verney	Hugh Leonard	Missing	23 July 1966
Moira and John Gannon travel to Birmingham to ask Marker to find their son Michael, who they know is working as an undertaker. After Marker finds Michael, he goes missing again and Marker soon realizes that Moira and John's true relationship with Michael and their motives for finding him are not as they seem.
20	5	"You Can Keep the Medal"	Guy Verney	Julian Bond	Missing	30 July 1966
Grieving mother Ella Bowen refuses to believe the coroner's verdict that her daughter Heather committed suicide and hires Marker to find out how she truly died. Marker learns about Heather's connections with Phil Lyons' escort agency and the dubious club Don's, finding that the people who knew Heather are attempting to frustrate his attempts to learn the truth.
21	6	"You're Not Cinderella, Are You?"	Quentin Lawrence	Roger Marshall	Missing	6 August 1966
Marker is hired to help with security at the Hotel Railton during the 1966 FIFA World Cup. While there, Swiss photographer Kurt Heller is found dead and his hotel room burgled, leading to murder being suspected. Marker must find out the truth from chief suspect Jane Reynolds, who had been with Kurt and was seen leaving the hotel in a hurry around the time he died.
22	7	"Works with Chess, Not with Life"	Basil Coleman	Roger Marshall	Exists	13 August 1966
After helping to expose fraudulent food poisoning victim Miss O'Hara, Marker is hired by solicitor Faulkner to investigate his friend Dr. Alan Skerrett, who he suspects is being blackmailed. Dr. Skerrett is actually having an affair with Susan Lambert and his wife Nancy is aware of this, hiring Marker as well to force Dr. Skerrett to choose between her and Susan.
23	8	"It Had to Be a Mouse"	Kim Mills	Robert Holmes	Missing	20 August 1966
Despite refusing to run Marker's newspaper advert due to his editorial policies, newspaper owner Leonard Minster hires Marker to find his missing wife Rona and son Jeremy. Mary Hollobread, a journalist from a rival paper is also interested in Rona's disappearance and Marker finds himself deliberately getting arrested to try and reveal Rona's whereabouts.
24	9	"Tell Me About the Crab"	Jonathan Alwyn	Jack Trevor Story	Missing	27 August 1966
Dick Madison hires Marker to find out who threw a brick through the window of his estranged wife Catherine, but Marker learns that Dick is now in a relationship with Jill Lawrence and living in a shared house. Marker attempts to help restore the Madison's relationship while attempting to find the brick thrower.
25	10	"No, No, Nothing Like That"	Quentin Lawrence	Andrew Hall	Missing	3 September 1966
Vicar Harris Munro asks Marker to follow his wife Anna, suspecting her of having an affair. When Harris finds out that Anna has secretly been receiving treatment for diabetes without him knowing, he is prepared to drop the case, but Marker still has his suspicions, with Marty Cornwell, an ex-prisoner Harris has been helping potentially involved in any infidelity.
26	11	"There Are More Things in Heaven and Earth"	Toby Robertson	Julian Bond	Missing	10 September 1966
Solicitor Anita Barnes asks Marker to visit widow Stella Rouse to discuss selling her house to a university. When strange noises are heard and Stella's bedroom wall mirror mysteriously smashed one night, Stella suspects Marker is trying to frighten her out but journalist Tony Hart suspects an ancient family curse is involved, to Marker's disbelief.
27	12	"Twenty Pounds of Heart and Muscle"	Piers Haggard	Robert Holmes	Missing	17 September 1966
Pauline Garrity asks Marker to find her father Enoch's stolen racing whippet Jackie. Enoch suspects his rival Yorky Thorpe stole the dog, but Marker discovers that Paddie Farrell, a penniless Irishman who has suddenly come into money is responsible and that Jackie's trail leads to an animal testing laboratory where it may already be too late to save her.
28	13	"What's the Matter? Can't You Take a Sick Joke?"	Guy Verney	Hugh Leonard	Missing	24 September 1966
The funeral for Ethel Wycherley's late husband James is disrupted when it emerges his burial plot in the churchyard is already occupied. Ethel's brother Julian Brampton hires Marker to find the conman responsible for selling the occupied burial plot to Ethel. Marker finds a man called F.X. Fowler may be connected with this and other recent outrages.

=== Series 3 (1968) ===
The third and final series to be produced by ABC Television, prior to the company losing their weekend franchise in July 1968 following the franchise review called on by the ITA on the 12 June 1967. This was the last series not be networked across the ITV regional companies. This series was broadcast later the same year by Border, Grampian, Scottish Television, Southern, Tyne Tees and Ulster, though the series was not taken up by Anglia, Channel, Westward and TWW. This series has the worst survival rate out of all seven series, only one episode "The Bromsgrove Venus" is known to survive in the archives. A further 5 minute fragment from another episode "It Must Be the Architecture - Can't Be the Climate" was recovered from a Umatic recording of an ABC Promotional Reel produced at the time. It was also the second and last series to be set in Birmingham, and also the last to be broadcast on a Saturday, a practice that had been maintained for the past three series.

No. overall	No. in series	Title	Directed by	Written by	Archival Status	Original release date
29	1	"If This is Lucky, I'd Rather Be Jonah..."	Patrick Dromgoole	David Whitaker	Missing	20 January 1968
Phillipson's jewellery shop has been burgled, and Marker is hired by Valerie Kitson to find her wedding anniversary bracelet that she had pawned there, worried about her husband Eric finding out. Marker finds out Valerie's bracelet has not been stolen, but also learns she is being blackmailed over it, the object having previously been stolen in different circumstances.
30	2	"But What Good Will the Truth Do?"	Quentin Lawrence	Martin Worth	Missing	27 January 1968
Liz Chambers spots a woman resembling her mother while out shopping, having previously been told that she died when the ship Morristown sunk fourteen years earlier. Liz hires Marker to find out the truth, and Marker learns about the true provenance of the photo of Liz's mother that her father Henry keeps and what truly happened the night the Morristown sunk.
31	3	"Memories of Meg"	Dennis Vance	Robert Banks Stewart	Missing	3 February 1968
Arthur Wickham returns home to Birmingham after forty years in New Zealand looking for his former girlfriend Meg. When two women respond to his newspaper advert asking Meg to contact him, he hires Marker to determine which of them is the real Meg. Marker soon learns the two women have their own reasons for claiming to be Meg and that Arthur may have to face disappointment.
32	4	"Have Mud, Will Throw"	Peter Duguid	Roger Marshall	Missing	10 February 1968
Sent to repossess a walnut dressing table from George Houghton, Marker finds that the table is not there and that George's wife had been run over and killed in a street accident the previous week, with £45 she had on her at the time missing. Searching for the table and the money, Marker's investigations threaten to reveal family secrets that have been kept from George.
33	5	"But They Always Come Back for Tea"	Kim Mills	Roger Marshall	Missing	17 February 1968
After finding truant young student Robin Warren, Marker is asked by his teacher Angie Gordon (from Don't Forget You're Mine) to find out how he obtained a grammar school place ahead of his more intelligent best friend Alun Fielding, suspecting he obtained it by corrupt means. Marker's investigations cause him to make a powerful enemy out of Robin's councillor dad Harry.
34	6	"Mercury in an Off-White Mac"	Kim Mills	Roger Marshall	Missing	24 February 1968
Sergeant Jack Davidson's son Brian is arrested for burglary and Jack asks Marker to find out who Brian was working with, refusing to believe Brian's claims he did the burglaries himself. Marker's investigations lead to him coming face to face with 2 women named George and Diane, who are exploiting men to commit burglaries and may have been involved with Brian.
35	7	"Strictly Private and Confidential"	Patrick Dromgoole	Alun Falconer (Note: Credited as Robert Wynatt.)	Missing	2 March 1968
Brenda Smedley has left home and has gone missing. Hired by her fiance George Aston, Marker learns that Brenda had previously stolen money from her employer and her family is now in debt to loan sharks trying to repay the stolen money. However, Marker finds that the repayments are up to date and so he must find the mysterious benefactor helping the Smedleys pay.
36	8	"Honesty is the Best Policy – But Who Can Afford the Premiums!"	Robert Tronson	Bill Craig	Missing	9 March 1968
Lewis Burnside asks Marker to investigate David Marchmont, who is now dating his ex-wife Vera. Marker soon discovers that David and his sister Judy are con artists, stringing Vera along with the promise of marriage. When Vera takes the bait and marries David, Marker must help her get her money back from David and uncover Lewis' true interest in the case.
37	9	"The Bromsgrove Venus"	James Goddard	Anthony Skene	Exists	16 March 1968
Librarian Paul Ainsworth is shocked when he sees a naked photo of his wife Marie entered into a photography competition held at his library. He hires Marker to find out who took the photo, but Marie then hires Marker herself, revealing that she is being blackmailed over the photo. Trying to find who released the photo, Marker's trail leads to a dance studio.
38	10	"It Must Be the Architecture - Can't Be the Climate"	James Goddard	Robert Holmes	Missing	23 March 1968
Dr. Bohan's medical career is in jeopardy following the death of his pregnant ex-girlfriend Paulette Hinckman from a botched abortion, with rumors suggesting he was responsible. He hires Marker to clear his name and find out who was truly responsible, but Marker finds the answers for who killed Paulette may lie a lot closer to home than her parents or Dr. Bohan realise.
39	11	"It's Learning About the Lies that Hurts"	Kim Mills	Robert Holmes	Missing	30 March 1968
Alderman Cyril Whittaker is found dead in a park. Dissatisfied with the explanation for his death, his daughter Louisa hires Marker to find out the truth. With Cyril having worked together with Sam Docherty on a business deal prior to his death, Marker finds that Docherty is eager for certain details surrounding Cyril's death not to come to light.
40	12	"There's No Future in Monkey Business"	Alan Gibson	Brian Hayles	Missing	6 April 1968
Elderly boatman Harry Latham hires Marker to find his missing daughter Nancy, hoping for her to inherit his canal boats upon his death. When Marker finds Nancy, she refuses to come home, however it emerges Harry's partner, the young Jago is secretly conspiring with businessman Herbert Barnby to inherit the boats himself for a lucrative coal hauling contract.
41	13	"Cross That Palm When We Come to It"	Peter Duguid	Roger Marshall	Missing	13 April 1968
Marker is hired by a solicitor calling himself Muirie to serve as a middleman between an insurance company and a gang of jewel thieves who want to hand back the jewels they stole for the reward money being offered. After the money and jewels are exchanged, Marker is arrested with the jewels in his office and imprisoned for handling stolen property.

=== Series 4 (1969) ===
The first series to be produced by Thames Television following the franchise review in 1967 where ABC lost their licence for weekend broadcasting, and had merged with Associated-Rediffusion to form Thames Television. At seven episodes long, this series had the shortest run of the show's tenure. This series was also the first to be fully networked across the ITV regions, and the first series to have all its episodes survive in the archives. The series marks a change in tone after two series set in Birmingham; following on from Frank's arrest and sentencing to prison at the end of the previous series, he is released on probation and attempts to rebuild his life by relocating to Brighton. Each episode was written by co-creator Roger Marshall and constructed as a seven part serial. In the run up to the commencement of colour broadcasting on both BBC1 and ITV in November 1969, the final episode of the series, "A Fixed Address" was taped in colour, although the episode still used the same monochrome title sequence from that series and was also broadcast in monochrome. This series also saw the introduction of semi-regular supporting characters, which was a feature absent up to this point in the show's run. This series introduced Marker's landlady Helen Mortimer (Pauline Delaney) who would appear in almost every episode in this series and would appear on a semi regular basis on subsequent series. (Note: Delaney also played two other characters earlier on in the series, appearing in the episodes "My Life, That's a Marriage" and "Don't Forget Your Mine".) John Grieve also regularly appeared through this series as his probation officer Jim Hull. Up to now the series had been broadcast on Saturday, but with the show now being produced by Thames whose licence only extended to weekday broadcasting, the transmission day was switched to Wednesday, and it would remain this way until the end of Series 6.

No. overall	No. in series	Title	Directed by	Written by	Original release date
42	1	"Welcome to Brighton? (Note: First appearance of Helen Mortimer and Jim Hull.)"	Kim Mills	Roger Marshall	30 July 1969
Marker is released on probation from Ford Prison and sent to Brighton to lodge with boarding house owner Helen Mortimer. Marker is nearly robbed by a woman called Grace and he tracks down Freda, the wife of fellow prisoner Jakeman at his request since she has stopped contacting him and finds she no longer wants anything to do with him.
43	2	"Divide and Conquer"	James Goddard	Roger Marshall	6 August 1969
Marker begins work as a bricklayer for builder Kenrick. Meanwhile, two motorcyclists, Harry and Frank are travelling around Brighton, scamming cafe and pub owners out of their money with an envelope trick. After Marker exposes their con, they swear revenge on Marker, confronting him on the beach, but Marker is able to successfully talk them down from attacking him.
44	3	"Paid in Full"	Guy Verney	Roger Marshall	13 August 1969
Arthur Wilson, a fellow workmate of Marker's at Kenrick's builder's yard has his pay packet stolen and suspicion falls on Marker, leading to him being questioned by the police and in danger of being returned to prison. Although the true suspect eventually confesses to stealing Wilson's pay packet, Kenrick reluctantly decides to dismiss Marker from his job.
45	4	"My Life's My Own (Note: The Armchair Theatre play Wednesday's Child, broadcast in 1970 serves as a prequel to this episode.)"	Kim Mills	Roger Marshall	20 August 1969
While Mrs. Mortimer is away, Marker takes in Shirley Marlowe, a troubled visitor who makes a number of phone calls to a person called Chris. Shirley then attempts suicide and after Marker revives her, he visits Chris and her husband, Dr. Nourse, who Shirley had been looking after. Chris then arrives at the boarding house looking for Shirley but she has already left.
46	5	"Case for the Defence"	Guy Verney	Roger Marshall	27 August 1969
Marker returns to inquiry work, working for detective agency owner Joe Rylands. His first case is to find evidence that can reduce Barry Osborne's (previously seen in Paid in Full) murder charge to a manslaughter one. However, Marker becomes concerned by the interference of Barry's rich father Ben in the case, determined to not allow his son to go down for murder.
47	6	"The Comedian's Graveyard"	Jonathan Alwyn	Roger Marshall	3 September 1969
Marker, still working for Rylands is tasked with finding missing teenager Judy Blackburn by her aunt Mrs. Reid. Judy has partnered with failed comedian Billy Raybold for an act on the West Pier, but refuses to come home once Marker and Mrs. Reid find her. Marker and Rylands' disagreements over how to handle the case eventually push Marker to the point of resignation.
48	7	"A Fixed Address (Note: This episode was produced in colour but originally broadcast in black and white. The colour version is now used for television repeats and home media releases. Final appearance of Jim Hull.)"	Kim Mills	Roger Marshall	10 September 1969
Marker, against the objections of his probation officer Jim Hull is planning to return to solo inquiry work again. Meanwhile, Mrs. Mortimer's long-gone husband Denis returns, hoping to entice her to return and come to south-east Asia with him. Mrs. Mortimer refuses, helping instead to get Marker set up in his new office as he finally starts up in business on his own again.

=== Series 5 (1971) ===
For the fifth series, the setting changed again to Eton and the surrounding Windsor area, it would remain as the primary setting until early on in Series 7. At thirteen episodes long, this series was double the length from the previous series, and this format would remain this way for the remainder of the show's tenure. Filming on the series commenced in late November 1970, a few weeks after the ITV Colour Strike commenced when technicians went on strike after demanding higher wages for using the new colour studio equipment, and subsequently five episodes from this series were taped in monochrome. The first episode to be taped in colour was "I Always Wanted a Swimming Pool" in March 1971, a few weeks after the strike had ended. Due to the series being shot out of sequence, the monochrome episodes were changed around for broadcast and were not transmitted together. This series also marked the only one without any episodes written by series co-creator Roger Marshall. This series also saw the introduction of D.I. Percy Firbank (Ray Smith) who keeps a close eye on Marker after he sets up business in the area, over time they would establish a friendship and assist each other on cases, he would become the series longest running supporting character, making a total of fourteen appearances over three series . Nell Holdsworth (Brenda Cavendish) also made frequent appearances through this series.

No. overall	No. in series	Title	Directed by	Written by	Original release date
49	1	"A Mug Named Frank (Note: This episode was produced and broadcast in black and white due to the ITV Colour Strike. First appearances of D.I. Firbank and Nell Holdsworth. Last appearance of Helen Mortimer as a regular.)"	Quentin Lawrence	Michael Chapman	7 July 1971
Marker is asked to travel to Windsor by Patricia Gurney-Stuart, the wife of struggling businessman Gerald who has stolen a valuable antique box that was gifted to his mother Evelyn, similar in description to one that was stolen in 1947. After completing the case, Marker decides to move to Windsor as he has struggled to attract business in Brighton.
50	2	"Well - There Was This Girl, You See... (Note: This episode was produced and broadcast in black and white due to the ITV Colour Strike.)"	James Goddard	Philip Broadley	14 July 1971
Mary Freeman tells Marker about a stolen necklace and offers him a share of the reward money being offered for its recovery. She suspects her ex-boyfriend John Sheldon stole it, however, Marker and D.I. Firbank struggle to prove it while Marker must tread carefully to avoid trouble, Firbank being aware of his imprisonment the last time he was involved with stolen jewellery.
51	3	"Slip Home in the Dark "	Peter Duguid	Ray Jenkins	21 July 1971
Barbara Pitt, a lonely housewife is being blackmailed over the phone about a secret only she and her husband Ken knows. Barbara's friend Polly Bevans hires Marker to help find the blackmailer but Marker finds Barbara extremely reluctant to talk, afraid of what Ken might do if he found out about the blackmail and even finds the idea of paying the blackmailer preferable.
52	4	"I Always Wanted a Swimming Pool"	Dennis Vance	Philip Broadley	28 July 1971
Marker is hired by Swedish art buyer Sven Gustaffson to investigate art collector Charles Luce, suspecting he has been sold a forged painting. Rapidly learning to be an art expert, Marker poses as an interested buyer to Luce and must determine whether Luce and Alan Grove, an artist living under his roof are forging paintings.
53	5	"The Beater and the Game"	Peter Duguid	Michael Chapman	4 August 1971
Marker is hired by a woman calling herself Mrs Murfield, asking him to find her divorced husband, ex-policeman Stanley, having tracked him down to Windsor from Doncaster. However, Marker finds that the woman is not Stanley's wife and that she is related to American gangster Terence Gorman, who wants revenge on Stanley for imprisoning his brother, who then died of cancer in prison.
54	6	"Come Into the Garden, Rose "	Bill Bain	Douglas Livingstone	11 August 1971
Marker is hired by Miss Pritchard, who runs a retirement home where one of the residents, Rose Mason has reported thefts. However, Rose is using this as cover for an affair with porter Harry Brierly, having sold the items reported stolen and when they elope, Marker and Rose's family must track the pair down and bring Rose back again.
55	7	"And When You've Paid the Bill, You're None the Wiser"	Piers Haggard	Trevor Preston	18 August 1971
Helen Kulman asks Marker to investigate her son Peter's suicide, wanting to understand why he did it. Marker however finds that Peter's uncle Geoffrey and brother Martin, owners of a construction company are reluctant to talk and Geoffrey even tries bribing Marker to stop the investigation. Marker then finds the unusual Jan Carling may have the answers regarding Peter's suicide.
56	8	"Who Wants to Be Told Bad News?"	Douglas Camfield	John Kershaw	25 August 1971
Estate agent Alfred Bain asks Marker to check the credit status of Indian immigrant Suresh Dhanar, who is interested in buying a cottage of his. Marker finds that Dhanar's lack of references and prison sentence for fraudulent conversion make him an unsuitable customer, but struggles to convince Bain of this as he believes Marker is motivated by racism.
57	9	"The Man Who Didn't Eat Sweets"	James Gatward	Richard Harris	1 September 1971
Julia Meadows finds a suspicious photo of another woman in a jacket belonging to her husband Eddie and asks Marker to investigate whether he's having an affair or not. Marker discovers that Eddie is a bigamist with three wives, travelling round the country to visit each one in turn and must decide how to break the news to Julia.
58	10	"Ward of Court"	William G. Stewart	James Doran	8 September 1971
Solicitor Smythson asks Marker on behalf of mother Ruth Bailey to find her son David, who has been taken by his father Martin and tracked down to Windsor. Marker finds David, Martin and his new girlfriend Ann living happily together but they disappear again. As Ruth arrives in Windsor, Marker faces a moral dilemma on whether to return David to her or not.
59	11	"Transatlantic Cousins"	Dennis Vance	James Doran	15 September 1971
The American L'Ettrell family, tourists visiting Windsor find antique cutlery bearing their family crest in Hubermann's antiques shop. Father John hires Marker to find their English relatives. Marker finds Sir Roger L'Ettrell, but he finds he wants nothing to do with his American relatives, while daughter Lana makes an unexpected family discovery of her own.
60	12	"Shades of White "	Piers Haggard	Robert Muller	22 September 1971
Allan Biddersloe hires Marker to keep an eye on his daughter Anne, suspicious of the company she keeps, with a spate of burglaries linked to the parties she has been attending. As Marker investigates, he clashes with D.I. Firbank over the Biddersloes' housekeeper Barbara Lewson-Jones, with Firbank suspecting she is involved in the burglaries.
61	13	"John VII. Verse 24"	David Wickes	Peter Hill	29 September 1971
Policeman David Holland has been suspended from duty, allegedly for stealing from a woman's handbag. However, her husband Jane suspects it is really because he saw D.I. Firbank conversing with Alec Payton, a known criminal in a bar and hires Marker to investigate, forcing him to confront the possibility that Firbank may be corrupt.

=== Series 6 (1972-73) ===
The sixth series and the first to be taped entirely in colour. This series was beset by a couple of broadcast delays, the transmission date for episode three "Many a Slip" was delayed by a week due to Boxing coverage of the bout between Muhammad Ali vs. Bob Foster from the previous day, and it also faced a mid series delay when episode seven "A Family Affair" was postponed by a week, as there was no broadcast scheduled immediately after Christmas. This was also the second and last series to wholly be set in Eton, since the setting would change early on in the following series. It was also the last series to be broadcast on a Wednesday, a practise that had been maintained since Series 4.

No. overall	No. in series	Title	Directed by	Written by	Original release date
62	1	"The Bankrupt"	James Gatward	James Doran	8 November 1972
Garage owner Tom Lewis asks Marker to investigate Melville Hayden-Jones, a struggling businessman who is filing for bankruptcy, owing Tom £1500. As Marker investigates, he finds holes in Melville's story and that he has employed a number of financial tricks to try to avoid responsibility, hoping to also recover debt he owes a finance company Marker has been doing work for.
63	2	"Girl in Blue"	Dennis Vance	Roger Marshall	15 November 1972
Brian Summers is shocked to see his estranged daughter Janice in a soft porn movie and hires Marker to find her. As Marker dives into the legally dubious world of porn movies, he finds no one connected with the film knows where Janice is now, but her mother Mona does and is anxious that Marker does not find her and tell Brian of her whereabouts.
64	3	"Many a Slip"	David Wickes	John Kershaw	29 November 1972
Don Farmer hires Marker to perform credit checks on a number of customers purchasing his freezer company's products on finance. Investigating Felicity Pembroke, the wife of a doctor paying for the freezer with the housekeeping money he gives her, he finds the doctor's marital status is unclear, inadvertently uncovering a possible insurance fraud.
65	4	"Mrs. Podmore's Cat (Note: Final appearance of Nell Holdsworth.)"	Bill Bain	Philip Broadley	6 December 1972
Rich widow Diana Podmore asks Marker to look after her pet cat Bertie while she's away at a health farm. While looking after Bertie, Marker encounters her old flame Major Thursby-Byers who steals a miniature portrait Diana had purchased. Thursby-Byers in turn pins the blame on Diana's latest interest, Ronnie Baker, leading to him facing trouble from D.I. Firbank.
66	5	"The Man Who Said Sorry"	Jonathan Alwyn	Richard Harris	13 December 1972
A man calling himself Philip Raymond Barrett visits Marker at his office late at night, asking him to investigate his wife, suspecting her of having an affair. However, he soon reveals his real surname as Clemens, a former client of Marker from five years before and has come to confront him, blaming him for ruining his life.
67	6	"Horse and Carriage"	Bill Bain	Richard Harris	20 December 1972
Shortly before Christmas, piano tuner Harry Longstaff asks Marker to investigate his wife Lil, suspecting her of having an affair while Lil asks her ex-policeman friend George to do the same to Harry. Marker and George's investigations lead to various misunderstandings as they wrongly assume Harry and Lil's actions are proof of their infidelity.
68	7	"A Family Affair"	Douglas Camfield	John Kershaw	3 January 1973
After their father Charles Knight dies, his sons John and Henry ask solicitor Mr. Brown to investigate Charles' will, unhappy that their housekeeper Harriet Thorne is also receiving an equal share of the inheritance. Mr. Brown in turn hires Marker to investigate Harriet, where he discovers that Harriet knows more about the true inheritance situation in the Knight family.
69	8	"The Golden Boy"	Douglas Camfield	Philip Broadley	10 January 1973
Vyvyan Reveldale, a promising young student has disappeared and his concerned tutor Aston hires Marker to find him, having found that Vyvyan's father Sir John refuses to tell him anything about his son. When Marker eventually finds Vyvyan in a pub, he finds that Vyvyan has his own reasons for disappearing despite appearing to have it all.
70	9	"The Windsor Royal"	Douglas Camfield	Philip Broadley	17 January 1973
The Windsor Royal is a new hybrid rose species being developed by horticulturalist Clemence Lawrence. When two bushes with Windsor Royals growing on them are stolen, he suspects his former partner turned rival Ron Hayward is responsible and hires Marker to retrieve them. Marker's investigations reveal there are more reasons for stealing the bushes than professional rivalry.
71	10	"It's a Woman's Privilege (Note: One-off reappearance of Helen Mortimer.)"	Jim Goddard	Michael Chapman	24 January 1973
Mrs. Mortimer reunites with Marker in Windsor, having come not just for friendly reasons but also to ask him to investigate her son Nick, concerned he is living beyond his means in a large house and not trusting Everard, Nick's business partner. Marker finds out that Everard's company is in financial trouble and Nick is possibly being set up as the fall guy when trouble hits.
72	11	"Home and Away"	Robert Knights	Brian Finch	31 January 1973
Madge Reading asks Marker to investigate her football coach husband Donald as she suspects him of having an affair. Despite Madge presenting a lipstick-stained shirt as evidence of his infidelity, Marker's investigations are unable to prove Donald is having an affair, appearing to have strictly innocent relations with the other women surrounding his team.
73	12	"Egg and Cress Sandwiches"	Graham Evans	Michael Chapman	7 February 1973
Church warden Major-General Felcourt asks Marker to find out who's sending poison pen letters about his parish's controversial new vicar William Pratt, who has clashed with Felcourt on a number of issues surrounding the running of the parish church. As Marker investigates, he finds both Felcourt and Pratt reluctant to talk about the letters and whether there is any truth behind them.
74	13	"The Trouble with Jenny"	David Wickes	Roger Marshall	14 February 1973
Having missed his train home, Marker stays the night at a London hotel where the troubled Jenny Wellard has also come to stay. After Jenny attempts suicide, her husband Arthur hires Marker to investigate why she came to London from their Wiltshire home and Marker discovers that Jenny and a number of other women she knew are being blackmailed.

=== Series 7 (1975) ===
For the seventh and final series, the setting changed several times, moving from Eton to Walton-on-Thames, and ultimately to Chertsey midway during the series. This series operated around three loose story arcs as Marker moved onto another location, and as a result it also saw the departure of long running supporting character D.I. Percy Firbank in "How About a Cup of Tea?", which also introduces Ron Gash (Peter Childs), a former policeman and friend of Percy's, who runs a private investigation agency. Marker would then relocate to Walton-on-Thames and partner with Gash in the episode "How About It, Frank?" before leaving the partnership in "What's to Become of Us?" and returning to solo inquiry work in Chertsey for the remainder of the show's run. Scheduling of this series was switched to Monday, and the transmission date for the last episode of the series "Unlucky For Some" was delayed for a week, due to it being postponed over Easter. Due to the series being produced out of sequence, the last episode that was produced and taped was "How About It, Frank?" in late November 1974.

No. overall	No. in series	Title	Directed by	Written by	Original release date
75	1	"Nobody Wants to Know"	Douglas Camfield	James Doran	6 January 1975
Solicitor Ralston tasks Marker with finding Janet Harper, a witness who can provide an alibi for Joe Martins, who is facing a lengthy sentence for armed robbery. As Marker investigates, he is threatened by thug Dave Tarrant to stop the investigation. Marker finds Janet and convinces her to appear in court, but is then beaten up by Tarrant for his trouble.
76	2	"How About a Cup of Tea? (Note: First appearance of Ron Gash. Final appearances of Helen Mortimer and D.I. Firbank.)"	Bill Bain	John Kershaw	13 January 1975
Recovering from his beating, Marker is visited by Mrs. Mortimer and offered a new job by D.I. Firbank, but Marker is unhappy to see either of them and tries to leave inquiry work, but finds he is thought of as being too old for a new job. Firbank is then transferred to Reading, but his friend Ron Gash, another private detective puts forward an offer to Marker.
77	3	"How About It, Frank?"	Bill Bain	James Doran	20 January 1975
Marker accepts Ron Gash's offer to investigate Brian Hart on behalf of a computer company to ensure he has a clean reputation. Joe Martins returns to thank Marker for helping to spare him from prison and the pair also locate Dave Tarrant, with Marker getting revenge on him for his beating. However, for this, Marker draws the suspicion of local D.C.I. Tyson.
78	4	"They All Sound Simple at First"	David Wickes	John Kershaw	27 January 1975
Now working with Ron Gash in Walton-on-Thames, Marker is tasked by Dominic Anders with retrieving £700 owed to him by his brother-in-law Anthony Croxley, who married his sister Nina. Marker finds that Croxley is able to pay but no longer living with Nina, while Nina herself has been shunned by most of the rest of her family for marrying outside the Catholic church.
79	5	"The Fall Guy"	Douglas Camfield	Brian Finch	3 February 1975
A woman named Alison hires Marker to go to a hotel and gather evidence for a divorce from her husband Julian Bradley, tired of his frequent extra-marital affairs. However, Marker is repeatedly tricked by Alison, who is not married to Julian and is the lesbian partner of Tuesday Simpson, Julian's alleged 'other woman'.
80	6	"What's to Become of Us?"	Douglas Camfield	Richard Harris	10 February 1975
Tom Hooper hires Marker to locate his missing wife Julia, who left him a month ago and has recently been seen in Chertsey. However, Marker learns from Julia that she is not Tom's wife and also finds that Tom has not been honest about his financial situation either. After completing the case, Marker and Ron Gash amicably part, with Marker having found premises for a new office in Chertsey.
81	7	"Hard Times"	Simon Langton	James Doran	17 February 1975
Marker moves into his new Chertsey office, but is hit by a higher than expected moving bill. His first clients, Bates and Wilson want him to find Jimmy Knaggs who they claim owe him money. Though he suspects the job is dubious, he accepts it, but it causes him to come under suspicion from Chief Inspector Reeves.
82	8	"No Orchids for Marker"	Graham Evans	Philip Broadley	24 February 1975
Elderly widow Lydia Alexander asks Marker to guard her conservatory, suspecting that intruders are breaking in to ruin her orchids. Marker finds that there are intruders entering the conservatory, but they appear to be after a stolen painting from an earlier burglary which may be buried under the conservatory, and Marker stands to gain a large reward if he can find it.
83	9	"The Fatted Calf"	Jonathan Alwyn	Brian Finch	3 March 1975
The workers at Rupert Robinson's factory are holding a work-in protest against upcoming lay-offs and Rupert is at odds with his son, university student Giles who takes the workers' side. Giles then goes missing and Rupert hires Marker to find him. Marker finds that Giles has fallen in with student radicals and that convincing him to come home will be difficult.
84	10	"Lifer"	David Wickes	Bob Baker and Dave Martin	10 March 1975
Arthur Biddle hires Marker to follow Brian Stafford, who he claims his wife Sandra has run off with. Marker however learns that Sandra is actually Arthur's deceased daughter, who had been killed by Brian fifteen years earlier, Brian having recently been released from prison. Marker faces a race against time to save Brian from coming to harm at Arthur's hands.
85	11	"Take No for an Answer (Note: Final appearance of Ron Gash.)"	Kim Mills	Roger Marshall	17 March 1975
Rosemary Jenks hires Marker to investigate her father, concerned at his recent behaviour. Mr. Jenks is under pressure from stationery salesman Ralph Carter and has resorted to forging the signature of his boss Mr. Graham on cheques to keep up. Marker eventually finds that Mr. Jenks will soon have little choice but to confess to his fraud, even if it costs him his job.
86	12	"Fit of Conscience"	Mike Vardy	David Ambrose	24 March 1975
A block of flats collapses, leading to several deaths and injuries. John Friendly, a civil servant involved with the flats who had acted corruptly asks Marker to find George Berry who was also involved, apparently feeling guilty over the disaster. Marker soon finds however that Friendly may really be looking for excuses not to present his evidence at the inquiry into the collapse.
87	13	"Unlucky for Some"	Jonathan Alwyn	Philip Broadley	7 April 1975
Ethel Waterfield suspects her daughter-in-law Paula, the wife of her son Keith may be having an affair with a man called Jeremy Fallows and hires Marker to investigate. Marker finds that Fallows is in fact blackmailing Paula and this may be connected with the apparent death of her first husband in a boating accident, who may or may not still be alive.
