= Brockhampton (disambiguation) =

Brockhampton was an American hip-hop group.

Brockhampton may also refer to:

- Brockhampton, Gloucestershire, Cotswold, England
- Brockhampton, Tewkesbury, a location in Gloucestershire, England
- Brockhampton (near Bromyard), Herefordshire, England
  - Brockhampton Estate, a National Trust property
- Brockhampton (near Ross-on-Wye), Herefordshire, England
- Brockhampton Press, a British publisher

== See also ==
- Bockhampton (disambiguation)
- Brookhampton (disambiguation)
