= Getting On =

Getting On may refer to:

- Getting On (British TV series), a 2009–12 British sitcom airing on BBC Four
- Getting On (American TV series), a 2013–15 American adaptation of the British series, airing on HBO
- "Getting On" (Doctors), a 2004 television episode
- "Getting On" (Don't Wait Up), a 1986 television episode
- Getting On (play), by Alan Bennett
