= Floodtide (TV series) =

- Book of the series
- Genre: Crime drama
- Written by: Roger Marshall
- Directed by: Tom Cotter; Sebastian Graham Jones
- Starring: Philip Sayer; John Benfield; Sybil Maas; Georges Trillat; Gaby Dellal; Connie Booth
- Composer: Matthew Scott
- Country of origin: United Kingdom
- Original language: English
- No. of seasons: 2
- No. of episodes: 13

Production
- Executive producers: Richard Everett; Divyan Bahri
- Producers: Steve Hawes; Mervyn Watson
- Production location: United Kingdom
- Running time: 45 minutes
- Production company: Granada Television

Original release
- Network: ITV
- Release: 14 June 1987 – 12 February 1988

Floodtide is a British television crime drama produced by Granada Television, first broadcast on ITV from 14 June 1987 to 12 February 1988. The series follows a police inspector's dogged pursuit of a group of cocaine smugglers across Europe and his bid to bring them to justice. A total of thirteen episodes aired over the course of nine months. Co-produced and partly filmed in France, it was one of the first ITV dramas to be co-produced with an international production company. Written by The Sweeney scriptwriter Roger Marshall.

Although further series of the programme were planned, the lead actor Philip Sayer was diagnosed with cancer in 1988 and died in 1989. Marshall concluded that it would be wrong to re-cast the part and instead decided to bring the series to a natural close.

== Cast ==
- Philip Sayer as Dr. Thomas 'Tommy' Ramsey
- John Benfield as Detective Inspector Brook
- Sybil Maas as Dany Lombárd
- Georges Trillat as Pascal Lambért
- Gaby Dellal as Tessa Waite
- Connie Booth as Isabel Palmer
- Oliver Pages as Marcel Joubert
- Linda Marlowe as Beryl Waite
- Alfred Lynch as P.F.
- Eric Denize as Tailman
- Raoul Delfosse as Serge Costo
- Wylie Longmore as Malone Foster
- Malcolm Scates as Detective Sergeant Ward
- Sarah Martin as Kath Parrock
- David Fielder as Detective Sergeant Jackman

== Episodes ==
=== Series overview ===
Series	Episodes	Originally released	
Series	Episodes	First released	Last released
1	7	14 June 1987	26 July 1987
2	6	8 January 1988	12 February 1988

=== Series 1 (1987) ===
No.	Title	Directed by	Written by	Original UK release date	UK viewers (millions)
1	"The Call"	Tom Cotter	Roger Marshall	14 June 1987	N/A
Exton Waite, A British member of Parliament and an old friend of Ramsey's dies from a supposed heart attack while taking cocaine, the reason for his death is kept secret. His body is found by his 24 year old daughter Tessa, a few days later she goes to France to ask Ramsey for help. While there she is followed by a mysterious man who later follows both of them back to England. Ramsey later meets Exton's lover Isobel who lets him know about what really killed Exton Waite.
2	"Observations"	Tom Cotter	Roger Marshall	21 June 1987	N/A
Ramsey talks to Exton's daughter Tessa to try to explain the reasons behind her father's cocaine addiction death, but when he later goes back to his hotel, he is shocked to discover that the police have been following him. After Exton's funeral, Ramsey goes to visit Wyn-Bennet, the doctor who signed Exton's death certificate, to get more information - but the doctor reveals nothing to him. Beryl then takes a vindictive visit to Isobel to demand her husband's things, but Isobel says no and Beryl threatens to take her to court.
3	"Words of Warning"	Tom Cotter	Roger Marshall	28 June 1987	N/A
Ramsey has a meeting with Kate Ross's father to talk about her death, but finds out from him that she was also taking heroin. Exton's widow Beryl is asked to go for her late husband's place in Parliament. Ramsey goes to see Isabel to ask her if she knows who Simon Wood is, and she confirms his identity. Ramsey has the bad cocaine that he got from Charlie's place examined by a pathologist, and is told that it contains a large amount of poisons and additives.
4	"The Trail"	Tom Cotter	Roger Marshall	5 July 1987	N/A
To lose the spy who is tailing him, Ramsey phones the police and tells them he has spotted a man exposing himself to every woman who passes by. When the police arrive, Ramsey makes his escape. He then goes to find Jody Price, to warn her that if she uses the bad cocaine, it could kill her or leave her with brain damage. Simon Wood, who sold her the drugs, is told by 'The Frenchman' that if he breaks free from him, he will kill him. When Wood disappears, Ramsey goes to his house to try and find out where he has gone.
5	"The Catch"	Tom Cotter	Roger Marshall	12 July 1987	N/A
6	"Prisoners"	Tom Cotter	Roger Marshall	19 July 1987	N/A
7	"Snowstorm"	Tom Cotter	Roger Marshall	26 July 1987	N/A

=== Series 2 (1988) ===
No.	Title	Directed by	Written by	Original UK release date	UK viewers (millions)
1	"The Chase"	Tom Cotter	Roger Marshall	8 January 1988	N/A
2	"Eyes Everywhere"	Tom Cotter	Roger Marshall	15 January 1988	N/A
3	"Blush"	Tom Cotter	Roger Marshall	22 January 1988	N/A
4	"The Trap"	Tom Cotter	Roger Marshall	29 January 1988	N/A
5	"Exile"	Tom Cotter	Roger Marshall	5 February 1988	N/A
6	"Freedom"	Tom Cotter	Roger Marshall	12 February 1988	N/A

== Novel ==
Floodtide, by "Roger Mark", based on the scripts of the TV series, was published in 1987 by Javelin Books. Copyright is assigned to Anthony Fowles, whose other credits include Dupe Negative (1972), The Fake Game (2022), Head On (2020), Necessary Things, student guides to several acclaimed authors, and a biography of Barbra Streisand.

== Home media ==
The complete series was released on DVD by Network in a four-disc set on 19 July 2010.
