= Cast No Shadow =

Cast No Shadow may refer to:

- "Cast No Shadow" (song), a song by Oasis
- Cast No Shadow (film), a 2014 Canadian drama film
- "Cast No Shadow", a song by Duncan Browne from Duncan Browne
