= Travelling Man (TV series) =

1984 British TV series

- DVD cover
- Written by: Roger Marshall
- Directed by: Sebastian Graham Jones et al
- Starring: Leigh Lawson, Lindsay Duncan, John Bird, Alan Cumming
- Theme music composer: Duncan Browne
- Country of origin: United Kingdom
- Original language: English
- No. of series: 2
- No. of episodes: 13

Production
- Production company: Granada Television

Original release
- Network: ITV
- Release: 7 November 1984 – 15 October 1985

Travelling Man is a Granada television series broadcast in the United Kingdom between 7 November 1984 and 15 October 1985. Created and written by Roger Marshall, one of the original writers of The Avengers, the series starred Leigh Lawson as Lomax and Lindsay Duncan as his girlfriend. Broadcast in the 9pm slot on ITV, the series drew audiences of up to 13.2 million. Each episode had its own story, within an overarching plot of Lomax searching for his missing son and hunting down those who framed him.

== Series one ==
On his release from prison, Lomax finds his wife has emigrated and is suing him for divorce. His son Steve has gone missing. Returning to his beloved narrowboat, Harmony, Lomax embarks on a long search for his son - and for the man who framed him. He is pursued by the police, who have him under surveillance, various underworld figures, and a journalist named Robinson - all of whom believe that he has a hidden stash of drugs money and will lead them to it.

== Series two ==
Robinson asks Max to look after his godchild, Billy. Max spends a weekend away from Harmony looking after a hotel, where the only guests are a mysterious couple. He is helping out in a pub, when a gang of motorcyclists are upset. Steve, his son, challenges him to prove his innocence and robs a betting shop. Unknowingly he upsets the local gang boss Jack Ormand. Max meets up with an ex-cellmate, 'Granny' Jackson. Max finally gets closer to finding the man who set him up. An ex-girlfriend gives him the name 'Len Martin', but he remains one step ahead.

A further run of thirteen episodes was commissioned but Leigh Lawson chose to leave, following an earlier disagreement with Granada which had refused to release him from his contract to take the lead role in Roman Polanski's film Pirates. Consequently, the cliffhanger ending of the final episode of series 2, which was intended to lead into series 3, had to be resolved with a brief voiceover on the closing credits by Terry Taplin.

Leigh Lawson as of 2010 has gone on record and said the main reasons for him not continuing into a third series were artistic. He was not happy with the fact it was being filmed on video, which it has to be said, does degrade sound and visual quality significantly in certain scenes. He also stated he was against one of the central story arcs being brought to a conclusion too early - namely the search for Lomax's son, Steve.

== Background ==
Marshall drew on his previous writing, in particular Frank Marker, the private detective he co-created for the 1960s/1970s drama Public Eye. Lomax shares some of Marker’s traits and moral dilemmas, their good intentions compromised by their time in prison. Both men will be pre-judged about their actions and plans, based solely on their 'shady' pasts. Marshall wrote each episode himself, adding a sense of continuity to the self-contained episodes. The Macclesfield Canal and the Chirk Aqueduct on the Llangollen Canal were amongst the many locations used in the dramatisation of the waterway film sequences.

== Cast ==
- Leigh Lawson as Alan Lomax, Max.
- Terry Taplin as Robinson, a Fleet Street reporter
- Lindsay Duncan as Andrea
- Derek Newark as Det. Chief Supt. Sullivan
- Freddie Jones
- Meg Wynn Owen as Gwen Owen
- Sue Robinson as Karen
- Michael Feast - Naylor
- Lynne Miller - Chrissie
- John Bird as Jack Ormand
- Bobbie Brown as Maureen
- Alan Cumming
- Tony Doyle as Len Martin

== Series overview ==
Series	Episodes	Originally released	
Series	Episodes	First released	Last released
1	6	7 November 1984	12 December 1984
2	7	3 September 1985	15 October 1985

== Episodes ==
Series 1 (1984)
Episode	Broadcast	Synopsis
1: First Leg	7 November 1984	Max is released from prison and returns to London to find that his wife has emigrated and that his son, Steve, is missing. He leaves London and embarks on his narrowboat Harmony. He takes up with a young woman, Andrea, and sorts out a demanding drug dealer for a former nurse who has become addicted. He gives her the drug dealer's money so she can book herself into a clinic.
2: The Collector	14 November 1984	Max continues his search, accompanied by Andrea. Max has to visit his sick mother in London. While he is away, Naylor interrogates Andrea about 'The Money' and sets fire to the boat. On his return Max seeks out Naylor at home and warns him off. Naylor gives chase on his motorbike, but ends up crashing through the barriers of an elevated motorway.
3 The Watcher	21 November 1984	Max's quest leads him to a village in Wales, where he immediately comes under suspicion when a local girl goes missing.
4: Grasser	28 November 1984	A hit man accidentally sends a bullet through a window on Harmony, and Max thinks someone is out to get him.
5: Moving On	5 December 1984	Max continues his search for Steve, and a girl thinks she recognises him.
6: Sudden Death	12 December 1984	Max attends his mother’s funeral in London, not knowing that Steve was also there. He meets Neil Pember, a former Drugs Squad colleague.

Series 2 (1985)
Episode	Date Broadcast	Synopsis
7 A Token Attempt	3 September 1985	Robinson asks Max to look after his goddaughter, Billie. Alarmingly, Billie’s attraction to drugs and her tendency towards self-destructive behaviour, turn out to be more than Max had bargained for. Max’s experience with Billie proves to be an unpleasant reminder of his worst experiences during the time he served in the Met Drugs Squad, and he is furious with Robinson for having put him in such a position.
8 Weekend	10 September 1985	Following another lead regarding his son, Steve, Max calls on an old friend, Ruby, who owns a country hotel. An accident means that Ruby is called away at short notice and Max offers to fill in for the weekend. The only guests who are due are a married couple, the Feltons. Mrs Felton, the rather flirty Jenny, is first to arrive, and her husband Brian who is on a weekend furlough from prison, arrives the next day. Everything goes well until Jenny is abducted and Brian starts receiving threatening phone calls. After Jenny is freed, Max starts putting the pieces together and realises that he has been witness to an elaborate, and ruthless, con. Fortunately, before Ruby returns, Max is able to cleverly frustrate the villains’ endgame. At the end of his strange weekend away from Harmony, Max realises that his determination to pursue his twin goals: to find his son - and prove his own innocence, has been renewed.
9 The Quiet Chapter	17 September 1985	A birthday barbecue is underway in the courtyard of a well-to-do Cheshire country house. Unseen, one of the guests surreptitiously opens one of the yard gates. A motorcycle gang roar in through the gate and run amok - smashing crockery, spoiling food and intimidating and terrorising the stunned guests. The bikers then ride off. Max is currently working as a barman at a country pub and restaurant, the Lydgate Arms. He attracts the admiration of Diana, a tipsy female diner who, having followed his advice to purchase an expensive bottle of wine, later demands the least he can do is drive her home. Back at the country house, the local police are questioning the party guests. Among the guests is a young man who is going by the name Stuart. We learn that Stuart is in fact none other than Steve, Max’s son. At the Lydgate Arms, a young man is making a nuisance of himself at the bar. This is Ollie, the same individual who opened the courtyard gate to the bikers earlier in the day. Max and the publican, George Jackson, eject Ollie, but he still seems very pleased with himself. Ollie’s overly confident attitude gives Max pause. It turns out that the bikers, who camouflage their movements by travelling in a horse transporter, are privileged sensation seekers who seem to believe that no rules apply to them. They block off the road to the Lydgate Arms and intercept the telephone line. That night, they lay siege to the pub. Max and the other staff there find themselves experiencing a terrifying onslaught of crossbow bolts, flaming torches and Molotov cocktails. Even though things seem grim, Ollie and the other bikers have seriously underestimated the always resourceful Max… Next day, Max is finally reunited with Steve and together, they push off in the Harmony.
10 Hustler	24 September 1985	Lomax and Steve, Max's son, spend a week together on the canals; Steve challenges Max to prove his innocence. He knows his father needs money to finance his quest and robs a betting shop. However, the shop belongs to local gang boss, Jack Ormand, who sets his heavies on the trail.
11 On the Hook	1 October 1985	It is mid-winter on the Fells. Max is having dinner with an old prison-mate ‘Granny’ Jackson and his wife, Elsa. Max has a photograph of Granny speaking with the deceased Neil Pember and is keen to discover what Granny’s business with Pember was. After the meal, Max encounters cattle rustlers and is knocked unconscious when he challenges them. The next day, Max returns to the scene of the cattle theft and discovers a distinctive cigarillo holder. He also encounters the shotgun-toting Carol, who challenges him. Carol is married to Bill - the owner of the stolen cattle. Max pressurises Granny to use his contacts and give him the name of the individual most likely to be behind the livestock thefts. Disguised, and adopting a thick Midlands accent, Max approaches the proprietor of a new slaughterhouse, Don Leckie. While on the premises, Max discovers another discarded cigarillo holder. At Max’s suggestion, Bill calls a meeting of the local farmers who have had their livestock stolen, to see if they are willing to tackle the thieves on their next criminal outing. Using an old van supplied by Granny, Max tails the abattoir’s livestock transporter when it goes out late the next night. When the thieves arrive at their destination, Max radios the farmers group - who move in. The determined farmers, together with Max and Granny, overcome the outnumbered thieves and then call the police. Next day, Max decides that even though Granny is an inveterate chancer, his assistance in uncovering and putting away the rustling gang means that he can rule him out as being complicit with the corrupt Pember.
12 Blow-Up	8 October 1985	Max tracks down John Lacey, a former employee of Neil Pember’s. Max shows Lacey the photos of individuals who interacted with Pember. But Lacey is frustratingly cagey regarding whether he recognises anyone. Max’s old girlfriend Maureen (who we first met in episode 6, ‘Sudden Death’) turns up on Harmony. Max explains that he eventually succeeded in finding his son, Steve. Max’s journalist friend, Robinson, visits Tony Reynolds, another former colleague of Max’s in the Drugs Squad. Reynolds recalls seeing Pember with one of the individuals in the photos that Robinson asks him to look at. He cannot recall the name but remembers he had an Irish accent. Back on Harmony, Maureen recognises the image of the individual who we, the audience, know to be Len Martin. Later, she recalls that he was the husband of one of her well-heeled London salon clients. John Lacey lets Martin know that he has information regarding “Pember” and “Lomax”. In expectation of a £500 payoff, Lacey tells Martin that Max is looking for him, but Martin humiliatingly stiffs him for the fee. Next, we learn that Martin is still in the drugs business. In a well-rehearsed ‘dead drop’ routine, he skilfully exchanges drugs for cash with a well-dressed Muslim businessman. Martin later exchanges the drugs money for explosives. Martin observes Max leaving the Harmony. He then places a bomb behind the narrowboat’s oven. The next evening, Max meets Maureen at the railway station upon her return from London. At the same time, the boat party that Martin has arranged for his clients, is getting underway. Upon their arrival at Harmony, Max and Maureen can hear the music coming from the Party Boat. Max is informed that there is a phone call for him at the Marina office. Maureen lights the oven onboard Harmony. As Max speaks to Robinson on the phone, the bomb we saw Martin plant, detonates with deadly effect. Onboard the Party Boat, Martin, his wife and their guests, hear the explosion. There is speculation – but of course Martin knows exactly what the sound is and believes he has just eliminated Max. As the episode ends, Harmony is a blazing inferno and there is no way for Max to save his friend, Maureen.
13 Last Lap	15 October 1985	Lomax at last catches up with Len Martin, the man who framed him, causing his prison sentence and eventual disgrace. A chase ensues. Len Martin dies, impaling himself improbably on an old ship. Max's quest has failed. The series ends abruptly.

== Critique ==
Travelling Man has often been compared to the mid-1960s American series The Fugitive, on which it draws both structurally and thematically. While protagonist Alan Lomax is not actually 'on the run', having served his time, it is clear from the start that the authorities still believe him guilty. While The Fugitive leaned heavily on the open landscapes of America, Travelling Man is set in the drug-infested world of the mid-1980s and in a location which adds a uniquely English slant to the fugitive subgenre: the canals and inland waterways of Britain. Although providing Lomax with both a home and a means of transport, the canals also exude a sense of quiet menace. There is an advantage, as he wryly observes in the opening episode: "One thing about quiet waterways, you can hear footsteps." For many viewers, the canal network offered an unfamiliar environment, a sense of ‘otherness’, cut-off from the modern world, reinforcing the impression of Lomax as both an outsider and an alternative hero. In addition, the slower pace allows Lomax time to explore other people’s narratives and provides his pursuers ample opportunity to spy on him and follow him at their leisure. Following the Western idea, Lomax’s boat Harmony represents his faithful horse and his wagon.

== Soundtrack ==
In 1984–85 Browne composed and performed the music for the British television series Travelling Man, in collaboration with the programme's producer Sebastian Graham-Jones. The soundtrack was released on vinyl and CD as Travelling Man - The Music from the Granada TV series. The track reached number 68 in the UK Singles Chart in December 1984.

All tracks are written by Duncan Browne & Sebastian Graham-Jones.

No.	Title	Length
1.	"Max's Theme"	3:10
2.	"Steve's Theme"	4:13
3.	"Lament For Billies"	2:16
4.	"Andrea's Theme"	2:32
5.	"Berceuse"	3:26
6.	"The Family"	0:52
7.	"Winter"	4:20
8.	"The Chase"	2:56
9.	"Day For Night"	1:21
10.	"Morag"	2:56
11.	"Zoot"	3:00
12.	"Travelling Man"	1:35
13.	"Old Flames"	3:23
14.	"End Of The Line"	3:43
Total length:		39:43

== DVD release ==
The series has since been made available on DVD by Network and includes a short critical guide written by Marshall's son.
