= Dance Emotions =

EP by Peter Godwin
- Released: 1982
- Genre: New wave
- Label: Polydor
- Producer: Georg Kajanus; Midge Ure on "Torch Songs for the Heroine"

Peter Godwin chronology
Dance Emotions (1982)	Images Of Heaven (1982)

Dance Emotions is the first EP by Peter Godwin. The EP was released in 1982.

== Track listing ==
All songs written by Peter Godwin

1. "Emotional Disguise" (Extended Version)
2. "Torch Songs" (Extended Version)
3. "French Emotions"
4. "Images of Heaven" (Dance Mix)
5. "Cruel Heart"
6. "Luxury" (Extended Version)
