= Philippa Urquhart =

British actress

Philippa Urquhart is a British actress, best known for her performance as Lillian Cartland in the 1980s BBC television drama Tenko.

== Career ==
Urquhart has worked as a film, television and theatre actress for more than fifty years. A former member of the Royal Shakespeare Company, she has appeared in numerous West End productions including The Sea (2008), Lady Windermere's Fan (2002), Wit (2001), and The Forest (2000).

Her television credits include: Vanity Fair, A Very Peculiar Practice, Dempsey and Makepeace, Wish Me Luck, The Bill, Mitch, Dixon of Dock Green, Within These Walls, and Casualty. Her feature film credits include Laughter in the Dark (1969) and the role of Janice in Alfonso Cuarón's 2006 film Children of Men.

== Personal life ==
She is the mother of the film director Jack Jewers, and she currently lives in the town of Rye, East Sussex.
