= Because of the Cats =

- Directed by: Fons Rademakers
- Written by: Hugo Claus; Nicolas Freeling (novel)
- Starring: Bryan Marshall; Alexandra Stewart; Sylvia Kristel; Sebastian Graham Jones
- Music by: Ruud Bos
- Release date: 15 March 1973 (Netherlands)
- Running time: 98 minutes
- Countries: Netherlands; Belgium
- Language: English

Because of the Cats, released theatrically in the UK as The Rape, is a 1973 Dutch-Belgian drama film directed by Fons Rademakers and starring Bryan Marshall, Alexandra Stewart, Sylvia Kristel and Sebastian Graham Jones.

The film's Dutch title was Niet voor de poezen. It was based on a novel by Nicolas Freeling in the Van der Valk series.

== Plot ==
In Amsterdam, Inspector Van der Valk is on the trail of a group of wealthy young men who go round attacking women for entertainment.

== Cast ==
- Bryan Marshall as Inspector van der Valk
- Alexandra Stewart as Feodora
- Sebastian Graham Jones as Jansen
- Anthony Allen as Erik Mierle
- Ida Goemans as Carmen
- Nicholas Hoye as Kees van Sonneveld
- Sylvia Kristel as Hannie Troost
- Delia Lindsay as Ms. Maris
- Edward Judd as Mierle
- Roger Hammond as Maris
- Derek Hart as Kieft
- Guido de Moor as Marcousis
- Lous Hensen as Mevr. Van Sonneveld
- George Baker as Boersma
- Liliane Vincent as Mevrouw Kieft

== Production ==
Sylvia Kristel revealed that the nude swimming scene was very difficult to film. "It was February and the temperature was 40 degrees below freezing. I had to walk into the North sea, very gracefully, I must say. There were six other girls in the shot and they all fainted. But not me," she said.
