= Metro (album) =

Studio album by Metro
- Released: February 1977
- Recorded: 1976
- Genre: Glam rock; art rock
- Length: 38:48
- Label: Transatlantic; Sire
- Producer: Peter Sames; Metro

Metro chronology
Metro (1977)	New Love (1979)

Metro is the debut studio album by English rock band Metro. Recorded in 1976, it was released in 1977 through Transatlantic and Sire Records. It is the band's only album to feature both of the core members, Peter Godwin and Duncan Browne, due to the latter's departure in 1978.

The album spawned the single "Criminal World" in 1977. The song was banned from BBC playlist due to its sexual content, which resulted in the record's commercial failure. It was later covered by David Bowie in his 1983 album Let's Dance, renewing interest in Metro's early work.

== Critical reception ==
Professional ratings
Review scores
Source	Rating
AllMusic	4.5/5 stars
Christgau's Record Guide	C+

AllMusic critic Dave Thompson praised the record, describing it as "an album of velvet-layered secrets and satin-sheeted mysteries, where lovers wear lace and have hearts carved from jade and the string section swells to save your ego the bother." Hailing the band as "original orchestral maneuvers in the dark, with only Bryan Ferry on hand to drive the survivors home," Thompson further wrote that Metro "remains a dirty secret, a secret sin, a sinful pleasure, and glam rock's final gleaming. How unlike it to leave the best till last."

== Track listing ==
All tracks are written by Duncan Browne, Peter Godwin and Sean Lyons, except where noted.

1. "Criminal World" – 5:22
2. "Precious" (Browne, Godwin) – 2:59
3. "Overture to Flame" – 1:54
4. "Flame" (Godwin) – 6:32
5. "Mono Messiah" (Browne, Godwin) – 3:57
6. "Black Lace Shoulder" (Browne, Godwin) – 4:25
7. "Paris" – 3:16
8. "One-Way Night" (Browne, Godwin) – 5:48
9. "Jade" – 4:41

== Personnel ==
Album personnel as adapted from album liner notes.

- Peter Godwin – lead vocals, harmony vocals, backup vocals, choir, synthesizer, vocal arrangements
- Duncan Browne – harmony vocals, backup vocals, choir, guitar, 12-string guitar, Spanish guitar, keyboards, synthesizer, vibraphone, tambourine, handclaps, string arrangements, vocal arrangements; bass guitar (1)
- Sean Lyons – guitar, 12-string guitar, effects, string arrangements
- John Giblin – bass guitar
- Simon Phillips – drums, percussion, congas
- Graham Preskett – violin on "Black Lace Shoulder"
- Barry Husband – vocals on "Mono Messiah"

Technical

- Peter Sames – production
- Metro – art direction, arrangements, production
- Dave Grinsted – engineering
- Sanders – photography
- Bob Franks – art direction
- Paul Chave – design
