= Give Me Take You =

Studio album by Duncan Browne
- Released: July 1968
- Genre: Folk rock; baroque pop
- Length: 41:24
- Label: Immediate
- Producer: Andrew Loog Oldham

Duncan Browne chronology
Give Me Take You (1968)	Duncan Browne (1973)

Give Me Take You is the debut studio album by English singer-songwriter and musician Duncan Browne. It was released in 1968 through Andrew Loog Oldham's Immediate Records. On the record, Browne employs a folk music sound that is informed by rock, pop, and classical elements, with baroque-inspired arrangements. The album spawned the single, "On the Bombsite," which failed to chart.

== Background and history ==
Prior to his solo career, Browne was a member of the folk rock band Lorel, which was signed to Immediate Records. After their single, "A Whiter Shade of Pale", was rejected by the label, the band dissolved. Andrew Oldham, who was impressed by Browne's arrangement work for other Immediate Records acts, wanted a solo album from him. David Bretton served as a lyricist for the record and the two composed a dozen songs together.

The album's commercial failure coincided with Immediate Records' financial collapse. Following the company's collapse in 1970, Browne was presented with a bill for 2,000 pounds to cover the recording cost of the album. As with most of the Immediate library, the master tapes to Browne's work for the record are considered as lost.

The record was reissued mid-'70s on the Canadian-based Daffodil label. In 1991, Sony Music Special Products issued a CD edition that was mastered from three different vinyl sources, due to lost master tapes. Castle Records reissued the CD for the first time in the United Kingdom, with five bonus tracks. In 2009, Grapefruit Records released an expanded reissue, containing rehearsal recordings, demos, and an unfinished track.

== Critical reception ==
Professional ratings
Review scores
Source	Rating
AllMusic	4.5/5 stars

Despite its commercial failure, the album was received positively and gained attention, particularly from musicians from the respective music scenes at the time of its release. The Village Voice critic Richard Goldstein described the record as an example of "Pre-Raphaelite Rock." Billboard magazine regarded the record and its lyrics as auspicious and notable, respectively. Over the decades following its release, the album drew comparisons to the works of Paul McCartney, the Moody Blues, Van Morrison and Nick Drake.

In a retrospective review, AllMusic critic Bryan Thomas described the record as "one wonderfully tender album".

== Track listing ==
All tracks are written by Duncan Browne and David Bretton.

1. "Give Me Take You" – 3:23
2. "Ninepence Worth of Walking" – 3:27
3. "Dwarf in a Tree (A Cautionary Tale)" – 3:11
4. "The Ghost Walks" – 5:55
5. "Waking You (Part One)" – 1:09
6. "Chloe in the Garden" – 5:07
7. "Waking You (Part Two)" – 0:57
8. "On the Bombsite" – 3:10
9. "I Was, You Weren't" – 2:02
10. "Gabilan" – 4:03
11. "Alfred Bell" – 4:30
12. "The Death of Neil" – 4:30

== Personnel ==
Album personnel as adapted from album liner notes.

- Andrew Loog Oldham – production
- Duncan Browne – composition, arrangements, cover design, vocals, guitar
- David Bretton – lyrics, harmony tenor vocals, cover design
- Nicky Hopkins – harpsichord, keyboards
- Irish – engineering
- Derek Burton – cover design
- Max Edwards – photography
- Gered Mankowitz – photography
