= Dr.gam =

Italian singer-songwriter

dr.Gam
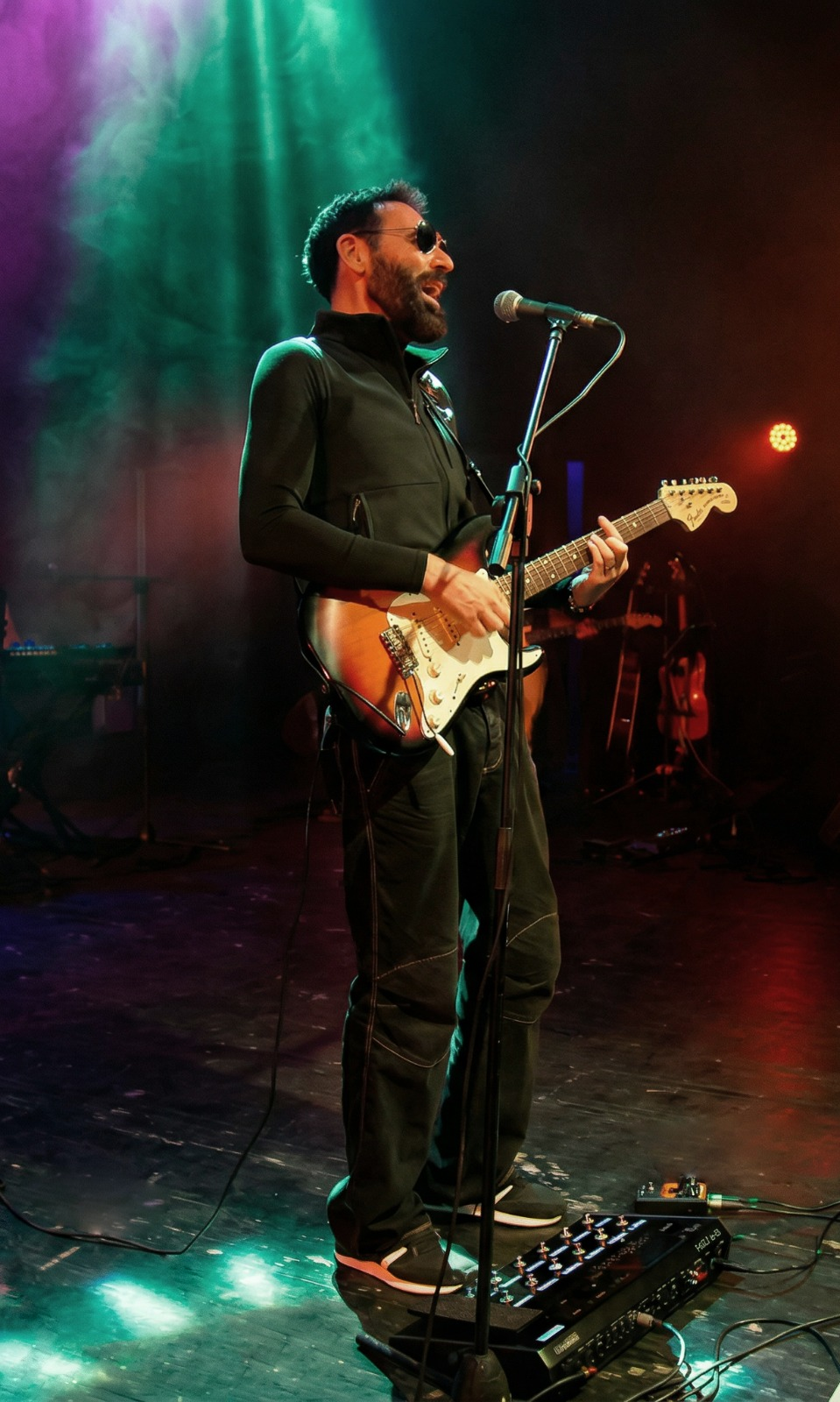
- dr.Gam during a concert in Rome in 2025

Background information
- Origin: Italy
- Genres: Indie pop, reggae, rock, soul
- Occupations: Singer, songwriter, producer
- Years active: 2001–present
- Labels: White Coal Records, Universal Music, AWAL (Sony Music)
- Website: andreagamurrini.com

Andrea Gamurrini, known professionally as dr.Gam, is an Italian singer-songwriter, guitarist, multi-instrumentalist, and record producer.

== Education ==
Gamurrini began studying piano at the age of five and classical guitar at the age of ten at the G. Rossini Conservatory in Pesaro. He later performed in numerous concerts across Italy, Europe, and the United States. Alongside his musical training, he earned a degree in Pharmacy from the University of Urbino.

== Musical career ==
In his early career, he collaborated on various recording projects as an author and guitarist for labels such as Saifam and Sony Music. He later expanded his activity internationally, notably collaborating with American percussionist Steve Ferraris, with whom he toured New England (USA) in 2005 and 2008, and Southern Europe in 2006.

In 2012, after a two-year Italian tour following the release of the live album The New Medicine Show, he was encouraged by Velio Gualazzi (father of Raphael Gualazzi) to record a studio album. This project, titled Another Family, was released in November 2016 and distributed by Universal Music Italy. The album featured American percussionist Steve Ferraris and Broadway singer Mary Setrakian. The lead single, "dr.Gam is in da house", was used as the theme song for the Dave Starr Show on KFM Radio in Manchester..

The album spawned two additional singles, "Italian Rastaman" and "Ritmo Ideale". Following a 2017 tour in Italy and Spain, the album was distributed in Spain, Portugal, and Andorra via FNAC and El Corte Inglés.

In November 2018, Gamurrini was guest of Maestro Peppe Vessicchio, who wants him at the close of his national tour “Musica Maestro” at the Concordia Theatre in San Benedetto del Tronto (AP), for which he composes an arrangement for strings for the medley prepared by dr.gam, performed together with the “Solisti del Sesto Armonico” In 2019, after participating in the ASCAP EXPO in Los Angeles, the album Another Family was distributed in North America.

In June 2023, he signed a new distribution deal with AWAL / The Orchard (Sony Music). In November 2023, he released the single "Kilimangiaro", whose 3D music video premiered in several Italian national newspapers.

In 2024, he released the French-language song "La Mer", with lyrics by Kelly Joyce. The song reached 7th place in the Italian independent foreign radio airplay chart. Later that year, he collaborated with British artist Peter Godwin on the ballad "Rise and Fall". Their collaboration continued in April 2025 with the single "Vieni a Cambiare il Mondo", marking Godwin's first time singing in Italian.

== Discography ==
=== Albums ===
- The New Medicine Show (2012)
- Another Family (2016)

=== Singles ===
- "dr.Gam is in da house" (2016)
- "Italian Rastaman" (2016)
- "Ritmo Ideale" (2017)
- "Kilimangiaro" (2023)
- "La Mer" (2023)
- "The Way Out" (2024)
- "Vota Barabba" (2024)
- "Connesso" (2024)
- "Rise and Fall" (2024)
- "Vieni a Cambiare il Mondo" (2025)

== Awards ==
- Luigi Centra International Prize (2022) – for the career.
- ANAT Award (2024) – awarded during the ANAT Grand Gala at the Teatro Olimpico in Rome in November 2024
