= Correspondence (album) =

Studio album LP by Peter Godwin
- Released: 1983
- Studio: Klockwork Studios, London
- Genre: New wave
- Label: Polydor
- Producer: Georg Kajanus

Peter Godwin chronology
Images of Heaven (1982)	Correspondence (1983)	Images of Heaven: The Best of Peter Godwin (1998)

Correspondence is the first full-length studio album by Peter Godwin. The album was released in 1983.

== Reception ==
Writing for Trouser Press, Ira Robbins describes Correspondence as "well-crafted, occasionally memorable, adult synth-rock". In December 1983, Jon Young, also writing for Trouser Press, noted the romantic theme of the album and remarked that "with only amour on his mind, he should be able to find some way of making the subject interesting".

Writing for CultureCatch.com, Robert Cochrane enthusiastically wrote that Correspondence is "a sublime confection, swish, accomplished and perfectly mannered" album, and noted the production and one songwriting credit of Georg Kajanus as a major factor in being "a notable feat achieved", with "ambition and a sense of near perfection".

== Track listing ==
All songs written by Peter Godwin; unless otherwise noted

1. "Baby's in the Mountains" - 4:14
2. "The Art of Love" - 5:31
3. "Window Shopping" - 3:12
4. "Soul to Soul" - 5:33
5. "Young Pleasure" - 4:24
6. "The Dancer" - 4:23
7. "Correspondence" - 3:35
8. "Over Twenty-One" (Georg Kajanus) - 3:09
9. "Soul of Love" - 4:45

== Personnel ==
Technical

- Raphael Preston - engineer
- Neville Brody - art direction, design
- Peter Ashworth - photography
