= Susan Fleetwood =

British actress (1944–1995)

- Fleetwood as Athena in Clash of the Titans (1981)
- Born: Susan Maureen Fleetwood; 21 September 1944; St Andrews, Fife, Scotland
- Died: 29 September 1995 (aged 51); Salisbury, Wiltshire, England
- Education: Royal Academy of Dramatic Art
- Occupation: Actress
- Years active: 1969–1995
- Partner: Sebastian Graham-Jones
- Relatives: Mick Fleetwood (brother)

Susan Maureen Fleetwood (21 September 1944 – 29 September 1995) was a British actress. Recognised for the performances on British stage and small screen, she was known for her work on the television series Chandler & Co and The Buddha of Suburbia.

== Early life and education ==
Fleetwood was born in St Andrews, Fife, Scotland, the daughter of Bridget Maureen (née Brereton) and John Joseph Kells Fleetwood, an RAF officer. She was the elder sister of musician and actor Mick Fleetwood, drummer with rock band Fleetwood Mac. The service family was stationed in Egypt in the years before the Suez Crisis and, afterwards, in Norway where John Fleetwood received a NATO appointment and where Susan received her first role as the Old Testament Joseph in a school play. On her return to the UK, she was encouraged to take up drama by a nun at a convent school, winning a scholarship to the Royal Academy of Dramatic Art at the age of sixteen.

== Acting career ==
=== Stage ===
After training with RADA, where a student production won Fleetwood the Bancroft gold medal, in 1964 she joined the company of the Liverpool Everyman theatre, where her fellow student Terry Hands had been appointed director. When Hands moved to the RSC in 1967, she followed. In 1968 at Stratford she gave two commanding performances: in the relatively unpromising part of Cassandra in Troilus and Cressida and as Regan in Lear. In 1969, under the direction of Hands, she movingly doubled the parts Thaisa and Marina in Pericles.

In 1974, she played Imogen in John Barton's production of Cymbeline. Many principal roles followed, until in 1977 the former RSC director Peter Hall persuaded her to join him in the National Theatre company where, in addition to playing Ophelia to Albert Finney's Hamlet, she was offered parts from a wider repertory of plays. In the early 1980s she appeared in seasons with both companies, including a memorable Rosalind in As You Like It. Her last season with the RSC was 1990–91.

== Personal life and death ==
Fleetwood's partner at the time of her death was British actor and theatre and screen director Sebastian Graham Jones.

After having ovarian cancer for a decade, Fleetwood died in Salisbury, Wiltshire, England on 29 September 1995, aged 51.

== Selected filmography ==
- Department S (1969) Episode: "The Ghost of Mary Burnham" as Miss Bronson
- Hamlet (BBC television recording of a Prospect Theatre Company stage performance, 1972), Ophelia, opposite Ian McKellen
- The Watercress Girl (Granada's Country Matters series, 1972) title role
- Don't Be Silly (BBC Television Play for Today, 1979) as Pamela Redman
- The Good Soldier (Granada Television, 1981) as Leonora
- Clash of the Titans (1981) as Athena
- Heat and Dust (1983) as Mrs. Crawford, the Burra Memsahib (The Nineteen Twenties in the Civil Lines at Satipur)
- Minder (1983) Series 4 Episode 2 "Senior Citizen Caine" as Sonia Caine
- Strangers and Brothers (1984) as Lady Caroline Quaife (2 episodes)
- Young Sherlock Holmes (1985) as Mrs. Dribb
- The Sacrifice (1986) as Adelaide
- White Mischief (1987) as Gwladys, Lady Delamere
- Dream Demon (1988) as Deborah
- Summer's Lease (1989) as Molly Pargeter
- The Krays (1990) as Rose
- Six Characters in Search of an Author (TV drama, 1992) as The Mother
- Shakespeare: The Animated Tales: Hamlet (series, 1992) as Queen Gertrude (voice)
- The Buddha of Suburbia (TV drama 1993) as Eva Kay
- Lovejoy (TV drama, Series 5, Episode 8, 1993) as Mary Gladden
- Under the Hammer (TV, 1994) as Calpurnia Beacon
- Wycliffe (TV, 1994) as Lady Cynthia Bottrell
- Chandler & Co (BBC Television, 1995) as Kate Phillips
- Persuasion (1995) as Lady Russell

== See also ==
- List of British actors
