= Images of Heaven (EP) =

EP by Peter Godwin
- Released: 1982
- Recorded: 1982 at The Record Plant NY NY
- Genre: Synthpop, new wave
- Length: 23:55
- Label: Polydor

Peter Godwin chronology
Dance Emotions (1982)	Images of Heaven (1982)	Correspondence (1982)

Images of Heaven is the second EP by Peter Godwin. The EP was released in 1982.

== Track listing ==
All songs written by Peter Godwin except where noted.

1. "Emotional Disguise" — 4:12
2. "Images of Heaven" — 5:35
3. "Torch Songs for the Heroine" — 4:01
4. "French Emotions" — 2:32
5. "Emotional Disguise" (Instrumental) — 4:14
6. "Torch Songs for the Heroine" (Ballad) — 3:21

== Covers ==
- Eloquent (USA) covered "Images of Heaven" - 2012
- Missing Persons covered "Images of Heaven on 'Dreaming'" - 2020
