= Getting On (play) =

- Kenneth More and Mona Washbourne in Getting On
- Original language: English
- Written by: Alan Bennett
- Genre: Drama

Premiere
- Date: 1971
- Place: Queen's Theatre

Getting On was Alan Bennett's second play, which opened at the Queen's Theatre in October 1971 and ran for nine months. It concerns a disillusioned present-day Member of Parliament, his family, a colleague, and the vicissitudes of their lives. It is a comedy with serious overtones.

The characters expound on their frustrations, their disappointments, their brushes with mortality and their brushes with social norms. Bennett introduces an openly homosexual character, a fellow MP who is asked how he feels about the life of a politician. He replies, "Passes the time. Fills in that awkward gap between the cradle and the grave."

Afterwards Bennett complained that the play had been "clumsily cut without my presence or permission and some small additions made: the jokes were largely left intact while the serious content of the play suffered."

The reason for his absence was a clash with the film star Kenneth More, who was playing the central character and who took a dislike to Bennett. "We just did not hit [it] off," More said. Ronald Bergan relates: "Trouble brewed from the beginning, when More refused to say certain lines he felt his public would not accept, despite Bennett's protestations that the play would be 'disembowelled'."

Just before a try-out performance More found Mona Washbourne, who played his mother-in-law, in tears after Bennett had spoken to her about her character. More insisted to director Patrick Garland that Bennett be barred from the theatre.

Later the director Frith Banbury came to Bennett's defence. "Alan felt that Mona was making the part much sweeter than it should have been and told her so. He dislikes sentimentality and sweetening up in any form. I'm sure he was artistically right. Anyway, it's easy to reduce actors to tears. I should know."

Two years after Bergan’s book was published, Alan Bennett wrote an extended introduction to a volume of four of his plays. This gives a different perspective on the genesis of Getting On.

For publication of the script Bennett restored the cuts.

== Cast ==
- George Oliver, M.P. - Kenneth More
- Polly Oliver - Gemma Jones
- Brian Lowther, M.P. - Brian Cox
- Enid Baker - Mona Washbourne
- Geoff Price - Sebastian Graham-Jones
- Andy Oliver - Keith Skinner
- Mrs. Brodribb - Edna Doré

== Critical reaction ==
Helen Dawson in the Observer: "Alan Bennett's new play... is no let-down after his dramatic debut Forty Years On. It's a meticulously detailed study of a Labour M.P., ten years into his second marriage, who feels tethered in a time of change; distrustful on the one hand of the 'mawkish mentality' of the young and, on the other, of the encroaching motorway life of the middle-aged. He's sagging, a representative of the people who doesn't like people very much, who can look forward to nothing more than the fairly imminent end of a not very interesting road. As his wife says, the hand has been dealt - all that's left is to play it... Bennett's writing is often bravura: there are lines which are good jokes; there are lines which are belly-laughs; there are passages of nostalgic enthusiasm and, suddenly, he can bring you close to tears."

Harold Hobson in the Sunday Times: "The play is a small jewel of bewilderment and angst."

B.A. Young in the Financial Times: "Mr Bennett has an uncanny gift for getting into the minds of a wide diversity of creatures."

The play received the Evening Standard Award for the Best Comedy of 1971. Bennett's reaction was, "Next year the award for Best Comedy will go to Long Day's Journey into Night."
