= Donald Zec =

British journalist and biographer (1919–2021)

Donald Zec OBE
- Born: Donald David Zec; 12 March 1919; London, England
- Died: 6 September 2021 (aged 102); England
- Occupations: Journalist and biographer
- Known for: Daily Mirror

Donald David Zec OBE (12 March 1919 – 6 September 2021) was a British newspaper journalist and biographer who worked for the Daily Mirror in various departments for 40 years.

== Biography ==
Zec's grandfather was a Jewish refugee from Odessa, in Russian Empire. His father Simon Zecanovsky settled in London, shortened the family name to Zec, and raised nine daughters and two sons. Zec was educated at Upton House Secondary School, Homerton in East London.

Zec was married for 66 years. After his wife Frances died in 2006, he took up painting, mainly with acrylic paint. In October 2012, he won The Oldie magazine's inaugural British Artists Award (OBA) for artists over the age of 60. A year later, his portrait of his late paternal grandfather (entitled "My Grandfather, the Pious Patriarch") was presented at the Royal Academy Summer Exhibition, jointly winning the Hugh Casson Prize for Drawing.

== Career ==
Zec's career in journalism began in 1938 with a three-day trial at the Daily Mirror. Interviewed by Michael Freedland in 2009, he recalled: "I was so embarrassingly bad that no one had the courage to tell me, so I stayed for 40 years." During the Second World War, he served in the London Irish Rifles, returning to the Daily Mirror as a crime reporter. On one occasion, he interviewed the acid-bath murderer John George Haigh in the Onslow Court Hotel. He followed this post by becoming the paper's Royal correspondent, "which I thought was a natural progression", he told Freedland.

Later, he became a journalist writing about film. In the course of his work he interviewed and wrote about many celebrities from the entertainment industry, including Humphrey Bogart, Brigitte Bardot, David Niven, Ingrid Bergman, The Beatles, and Marilyn Monroe.

In October 1967, he won a National Press Award as Descriptive Writer of the year, the citation spoke of his "bland outrageousness and a deadly certainty of aim". Extending his range, he interviewed major political figures such as a former Chancellor of the Exchequer Selwyn Lloyd, the Labour Prime Minister Harold Wilson, the (then) leader of the Opposition Margaret Thatcher, Lord Mountbatten of Burma and the former Californian Governor Ronald Reagan in 1967, commenting: "it is a whimsical if not uneasy thought that an ex-movie star of many films that escape instant recollection could one day become President of the United States of America". In 1970, Zec was awarded the Order of the British Empire (OBE) for services to Journalism.

The many books Zec wrote include biographies of the Queen Mother, Sophia Loren, Barbra Streisand, Elizabeth Taylor and Lee Marvin. Zec's biography of his brother, the political cartoonist Philip Zec, entitled Don't Lose It Again! The Life and Wartime Cartoons of Philip Zec, was published in 2005.

Zec died in September 2021, at the age of 102.

== Bibliography ==
- Barbra: A Biography of Barbra Streisand (with Anthony Fowles). London: Hodder, 1982; ISBN 0-450-05398-9 (softcover) / ISBN 0-450-04857-8 (hardcover). New York: St Martin's Press, 1981; ISBN 0-312-06638-4
- The Colonel – a novel. London: Virgin Books, 1980; ISBN 0-352-30537-1 (softcover). W. H. Allen; ISBN 0-491-02376-6 (hardcover)
- The Deal. London: Hodder, 1980; ISBN 0-450-04411-4 (softcover) / ISBN 0-450-04030-5 (hardcover)
- Don't Lose It Again! The Life and Wartime Cartoons of Philip Zec. London: Political Cartoon Society, 2005; ISBN 0-9549008-1-2
- The Face. London: Political Cartoon Society, 1981; ISBN 0-450-04752-0 (hardcover)/ ISBN 0-450-05226-5 (softcover)
- Liz: The Men, the Myths, and the Miracle – An Intimate Portrait of Elizabeth Taylor. Bookman Projects, 1982; ISBN 0-85939-316-X
- Marvin: The Story of Lee Marvin. London: Hodder, 1980; ISBN 0-450-04115-8. New York: St Martin's Press; ISBN 0-312-51780-7
- Put the Knife in Gently: Memoirs of a Life with Legends. London: Anova Books, 2003; ISBN 1-86105-697-4
- The Queen Mother: With Unique Recollections by the Earl Mountbatten of Burma. Thorndike Press, 1990: ISBN 0-86220-417-8
- Sophia: An Intimate Biography. London: W. H. Allen, 1975; ISBN 0-491-01732-4. G.K. Hall; ISBN 0-8161-6379-0
- Some Enchanted Egos: Decent Exposures of Some of the Most Celebrated Characters of Our Time. London: Allison & Busby, 1972; ISBN 0-85031-078-4
- This Show Business, Donald Zec on. London: Daily Mirror, 1959.
- When the Snow Melts: The Autobiography of Cubby Broccoli (with Albert R. Broccoli). London: PanMacmillan, 1999; ISBN 0-7522-1162-5 (hardcover) / ISBN 0-7522-1704-6 (softcover)
