= Bockhampton =

Bockhampton is the name of several settlements in England:

- Bockhampton, Berkshire, an area of Lambourn
- Higher Bockhampton, a hamlet east of Dorchester, Dorset, birthplace of Thomas Hardy, and site of Thomas Hardy's Cottage
- Lower Bockhampton, a hamlet east of Dorchester, Dorset
- Middle Bockhampton, a hamlet north of Christchurch, Dorset; see List of United Kingdom locations: Mid-Mig
- North Bockhampton, a hamlet north of Christchurch, Dorset; see List of United Kingdom locations: Ni-North G
- South Bockhampton, a hamlet north of Christchurch, Dorset; see List of United Kingdom locations: South

== See also ==
- Brockhampton (disambiguation)
