= Roger Marshall (screenwriter) =

English television screenwriter (1934–2020)

- Born: Roger William Marshall; 15 March 1934 Leicester, United Kingdom
- Died: 1 April 2020 (aged 86)
- Occupation: Television screenwriter

Roger Marshall (15 March 1934 – 1 April 2020) was an English television screenwriter known as co-creator of the series Public Eye.

== Early life ==
Marshall was born in March 1934 in Leicester, England and educated at Gonville and Caius College, Cambridge.

== Career ==
After leaving university, Marshall embarked on a writing career that included The Avengers, The Sweeney, Survivors, The Gentle Touch, The Professionals, Mitch, Travelling Man, Lovejoy, Floodtide, and London's Burning, as well as many other popular television series.

== Writing Credits ==
=== Film ===
Year	Title	Notes
1962	Solo for Sparrow	
1962	A Prize of Arms	Additional material
1963	Ricochet	
1963	The Set Up	
1963	Five to One	
1964	Who Was Maddox?	
1965	Game for Three Losers	
1966	Invasion	
1966	Theatre of Death	
1967	The Man Outside	Additional dialogue
1968	Twisted Nerve	
1970	Hello-Goodbye	
1972	What Became of Jack and Jill?	
1973	And Now the Screaming Starts!	
1981	Attack Force Z	

=== Television ===
Year	Title	Notes
1959	The Adventures of William Tell	3 episodes
1959	Markham	Episode: "Strange Visitor"
1960	Sea Hunt	Episode: "Counterfeit"
1960-1963	No Hiding Place	4 episodes
1961	Top Secret	3 episodes
1962-1963	Emergency Ward 10	12 episodes
1962-1965	Edgar Wallace Mysteries	6 episodes
1962-1967	The Avengers	15 episodes, including: "The Removal Men"; "Death of a Great Dane"; "Conspiracy of Silence"; "Death of a Batman"; "The Gilded Cage"; "The Golden Fleece"; "Mandrake"; "The Hour That Never Was"
1964-1966	Redcap	2 episodes
1965	The Mask of Janus	Episode: "And the Fish Are Biting"
1965-1975	Public Eye	Co-creator
1967-1972	Armchair Theatre	3 episodes
1969	ITV Playhouse	Episode: "Murder: When Robin Was a Boy"
1970-1971	Shadows of Fear	4 episodes
1973	Special Branch	2 episodes
1973	Orson Welles Great Mysteries	Episode: "Battle of Wits"
1973-1974	ITV Sunday Night Theatre	2 episodes
1975	Shadows	Episode: "The Future Ghost"
1975-1978	The Sweeney	8 episodes
1976	Survivors	Episode: "Parasites"
1977	Target	Episode: "Blow Out" (as David Agnew)
1977	Van der Valk	2 episodes
1980-1982	The Gentle Touch	8 episodes
1980-1983	The Professionals	4 episodes
1984-1985	Travelling Man	Creator
1984	Mitch	Co-creator
1985	Dempsey and Makepeace	Episode: "Love You to Death"
1987-1988	Floodtide	Creator
1989	The Ruth Rendell Mysteries	3 episodes
1991-1994	Lovejoy	8 episodes
1992-1994	London's Burning	3 episodes

== Personal life ==
Marshall was married with two children: Rodney Marshall, a teacher and freelance writer, and Christopher.

Marshall was a fan of Ipswich Town FC and Northamptonshire CCC.

== Death ==
Marshall died in April 2020 at the age of 86.
