= Duncan Browne (album) =

Studio album by Duncan Browne
- Released: 1973
- Genre: Folk
- Length: 37:55
- Label: Rak
- Producer: Mickie Most

Duncan Browne chronology
Give Me Take You (1968)	Duncan Browne (1973)	The Wild Places (1978)

Duncan Browne is the self-titled second studio album by English singer-songwriter and musician Duncan Browne, released in 1973 through Mickie Most's Rak Records. Stylistically, the album is a continuation of Browne's folk-indebted debut album, Give Me Take You (1968), and features progressive rock and electronic music elements.

The album spawned the Bob Dylan-inspired hit single "Journey", which peaked at number 23 on the UK Singles Chart. Nevertheless, both the album and the single were considered commercially unsuccessful for a follow-up recording, which prompted Browne to spend the next several years as a session musician. Since then, the album has garnered a cult following among folk rock fans and is now considered a "lost classic" from the era.

Duncan Browne was reissued by EMI in 2002, with four additional bonus tracks.

== Critical reception ==
Professional ratings
Review scores
Source	Rating
AllMusic	4.5/5 stars

AllMusic critic Bruce Eder praised the album, stating: "Even overlooking its own intrinsic merits, Duncan Browne is worth owning as a more mature and developed, if slightly less spontaneous, expression of the sensibilities that forged Give Me Take You."

== Track listing ==
All tracks are written by Duncan Browne

No.	Title	Length
1.	"Ragged Rain Life"	3:02
2.	"Country Song"	3:46
3.	"The Martlet"	4:19
4.	"My Only Son"	4:12
5.	"Babe Rainbow"	4:23
6.	"Journey"	3:22
7.	"Cast No Shadow"	4:23
8.	"Over the Reef"	5:39
9.	"My Old Friends"	4:12
10.	"Last Time Around"	4:51
Total length:		42:09

2002 EMI reissue bonus tracks
No.	Title	Length
11.	"In a Mist"	7:15
12.	"Send Me The Bill For Your Friendship"	3:40
13.	"Guitar Piece"	2:15
14.	"Mignon"	2:59
Total length:		58:18

== Personnel ==
Album personnel as adapted from album liner notes.

- Duncan Browne – vocals, guitar, flamenco guitar, arrangement
- Mickie Most – production, arrangement
- Jim Rodford – bass guitar
- Robert Henrit – drums
- John "Rabbit" Bundrick – organ, synthesizer, piano, keyboards
- John Cameron – piano, keyboards
- Keith Hodge – additional vocals
- Suzi Quatro – additional vocals
- Tony Carr – additional vocals

== Chart positions ==
Singles

Year	Song	Chart	Peak position
1972—3	"Journey"	UK Singles Chart	23
1972—3	""Send Me the Bill for Your Friendship" / "My Only Son""	UK Singles Chart	—
