= Images of Heaven: The Best of Peter Godwin =

Compilation album LP by Peter Godwin
- Released: Feb 3, 1998
- Genres: New wave, synthpop
- Length: 74:24
- Label: Oglio Records

Peter Godwin chronology
| Correspondence (1982) | Images of Heaven: The Best of Peter Godwin (1998) |

Images of Heaven: The Best of Peter Godwin is the first compilation album by Peter Godwin. The album was released on Feb 3, 1998.

== Track listing ==
1. "Rendezvous"
2. "Another World"
3. "Naked Smile"
4. "Baby's in the Mountains"
5. "The Art of Love"
6. "Young Pleasure"
7. "The Dancer"
8. "Torch Songs for the Heroine" (single version)
9. "Emotional Disguise" (12″ EP version)
10. "Images of Heaven" (full length version)
11. "Cruel Heart"
12. "Gemini"
13. "Criminal World"
14. "Images of Heaven" (Razormaid version)
15. "Baby's in the Mountains" (club version - John Luongo mix)
16. "Rendezvous" (French remix)

== Notes ==
All songs written by Peter Godwin unless otherwise noted.

== Covers ==
- Eloquent (USA) covered "Images of Heaven" - 2012
