= Brookhampton =

Brookhampton may refer to:

== Places ==
=== Australia ===
- Brookhampton, Western Australia

=== England ===
- Brookhampton, Oxfordshire
- Brookhampton, Shropshire
