= Public Eye (TV series) =

British TV drama series (1965–1975)

- Series 1 opening title card
- Genre: Drama
- Starring: Alfred Burke
- Country of origin: United Kingdom
- Original language: English
- No. of series: 7
- No. of episodes: 87 (36 missing) (list of episodes)

Production
- Production location: Teddington Studios
- Production companies: ABC Television (Series 1–3); Thames Television (Series 4–7)

Original release
- Network: ITV
- Release: 23 January 1965 – 7 April 1975

Public Eye is a British television drama that ran from 1965 to 1975, produced by ABC Weekend TV for three series, and Thames Television a further four. It depicted investigations handled by enquiry agent Frank Marker (Alfred Burke), an unmarried loner who is in his early forties when the series begins. The title is a twist on the more usual "private eye".

== Background ==
The series was created by writers Roger Marshall and Anthony Marriott with the aim of getting away from "square-jawed" heroes of the type featured in Hollywood movies—a wish shared by Alfred Burke, the actor chosen to play Marker. This aim allowed for flexibility in the structure and plot lines of the episodes; each individual episode usually dealt with an individual case for Marker, but story arcs spanning several episodes, or in one case an entire series, were produced during the life of the programme. Marker's work ranged broadly, from routine matters such as gathering evidence for divorces (at a time when British law required evidence of infidelity or other compelling reason for annulling a marriage) or creditworthiness enquiries, to more exotic investigations such as tracing missing people (or in one case, a prize-winning whippet). Many of the narratives conclude with Marker leaving a situation as it was at the beginning of the episode—for example, in "The Man Who Didn't Eat Sweets", he fails to tell his client that she is one of her husband's three wives.

== Cast ==
- Alfred Burke as Frank Marker

=== Recurring ===
- Pauline Delaney as Helen Mortimer (series 4-7)
- John Grieve as Hull (series 4)
- Ray Smith as D.I. Percy Firbank (series 5-7)
- Brenda Cavendish as Nell Holdsworth (series 5-6)
- Peter Childs as Ron Gash (series 7)

=== Guest stars ===
Public Eye featured a number of notable contemporary and future established actors in guest appearances, including Peter Sallis, David Suchet, Carole Ann Ford, Stephanie Beacham, Stephanie Bidmead, Alun Armstrong, Michael Gambon, Paul Rogers, Lesley-Anne Down, Susan Penhaligon, Julian Holloway, Brian Blessed, Terence Rigby, Stephanie Turner and Lynn Farleigh.

== Episodes produced by ABC Television 1965–1968 ==
The first episode of the series was broadcast (in black and white) in January 1965 and was set in London, although very little (if any) location work was actually performed and the episodes were mostly confined to the TV studio. Of the 41 episodes produced by ABC, only five are currently known to exist in television-broadcastable format—the rest being victims of the common television company policy of wiping. However, two episodes from the first series remain.

In "Nobody Kills Santa Claus", the second episode of the first series (transmitted 30 January 1965), Marker plays comparatively little part in the plot. The episode does establish key aspects of Marker's character: his modest lifestyle arising from his modest fees for his work—the oft-quoted "six guineas a day plus expenses" (which became £6.30 a day in the later Thames-produced episodes, once Britain converted to decimal currency)—his shabby office, and the fact that he is often compelled to take on almost any offer of work just to earn his living. The plot concerns Marker being hired to protect a rather unlikeable businessman, Garston, who is receiving death threats. In keeping with the series' ethos of downplaying physical violence, Marker insists on being employed as a chauffeur rather than a bodyguard. He ends up taking a physical beating for his unlikeable client—a beating that is mostly off-screen and one that the viewer only sees the results of. The episode ends with Marker refusing an offer of permanent employment by Garston and returning to his freelance ways.

Marker's work of necessity often involved him with the police and the criminal underworld—both factions dislike him and, although they have some need for him, make his life difficult. The other surviving series 1 episode, "The Morning Wasn't So Hot", sees Marker cross paths with an organised criminal gang; he is thrown into the River Thames by underworld figures as "persuasion" to drop his enquiries into the whereabouts of a missing girl he has been hired to trace—she has been forced into a life of professional vice at the behest of the gang. Partly as a result of this, the beginning of the second series he decides to leave London and moves to England's second city of Birmingham. Things do not improve, and he continues to be mixed up in a world of shadowy figures.

The ABC episodes ended with "Cross That Palm When We Come To It" (broadcast on 13 April 1968) as Marker acts for a solicitor over some stolen jewels, as a go-between with the gang who stole them and want the reward money. Taking the recovered jewels back to his office, Marker receives a visit from the police and is convicted of receiving stolen property—the solicitor who hired him was crooked and has disappeared. Marker pleads guilty to the charge and is sentenced to two-and-a-half years in prison. "Cross That Palm" is not one of the five surviving ABC episodes. It did however provide the basis for a 1974 novelisation by Audley Southcott (Sphere Books, ISBN 0722180349).

== Episodes produced by Thames Television 1969–1975 ==
Big changes had occurred in the ITV franchises in Britain in 1968, and ABC had been forced to merge with rival company Rediffusion London to create what became one of the powerhouses of UK television production—Thames Television. Thames picked up the series again in 1969 and produced 46 more episodes; unlike their ABC precursors all 46 remain safely in the archives, although 11 of these were still produced and broadcast in black and white. One other was made in colour (but broadcast in black and white) as a test of Thames's new colour equipment, which was first used for broadcasting from November 1969—two months after the fourth series of Public Eye finished its on-air run.

ABC's audience research had shown that many viewers found the character of Marker as interesting as his cases. For this reason, the first Thames series is quite different in style from the other three, and was written entirely by Public Eye co-creator Roger Marshall. Commonly referred to as 'the Brighton series', the collection of seven episodes links together to tell the story of Marker's release from prison and his gradual rehabilitation into everyday life, culminating in him renting a new office and starting up again as an enquiry agent. This series also introduces regular characters such as Marker's probation officer Mr Hull and his landlady Mrs Mortimer — the first such characters in the series apart from Marker himself.

=== The Brighton episodes ===
The first episode of the fourth series, "Welcome to Brighton?" (broadcast 30 July 1969) starts with a custom title sequence giving a brief recap of Marker's offence and his prison career. The first shot is of Marker lying awake in bed with the judge's voice going through his head, passing sentence on him. It is about a year since the events of "Cross That Palm When We Come To It" and Marker has been transferred to an open prison before being released on parole to complete his sentence. He is determined not to fall into a life of crime, despite what his fellow prisoners tell him ("You've crossed over the line now, mate — you're not one of them, you're one of us!"). In the first half of the episode, Marker is released from prison and heads for Brighton where the parole system has arranged accommodation for him with a Mrs Mortimer (Pauline Delaney). Through an extensive location-shot sequence on the sea front at Brighton, the viewer experiences Marker's disorientation at a world which appears to have changed considerably since he was sent to prison. He immediately encounters the very same sort of people with whom he dealt every day in his pre-prison life; a semi-drunken encounter with a woman who tries to steal his money and using his detective skills to trace the wife of a fellow inmate from the prison he has just been released from. Marker meets his parole officer, Mr Hull (played by John Grieve) and gets a job with a local builder, Mr Kendrick.

In the third episode of the series, "Paid in Full", a colleague at Kendrick's yard has his pay packet stolen (workers in Britain were still paid in cash, rather than by cheque or bank transfer, in the late 1960s). Although completely innocent of any wrongdoing (as he points out, he would be stupid to steal the money as it would immediately end his parole and send him back to prison) Marker is placed under immense pressure by Kendrick's other employees once they find out he is an ex-prisoner. The episode ends with Marker reluctantly agreeing to give up the job at Kendrick's, and graphically illustrates the problems faced by ex-convicts as they try to reintegrate into society. "Paid in Full" also contains a scene where Marker visits an antiques shop in Brighton to enjoy his newfound freedom to purchase something with the money he is earning. A conversation ensues with the old lady who owns the shop, wherein Marker explains some of his family history.

The fourth episode in the Brighton series, "My Life's My Own", is notable for an early television treatment of a lesbian relationship. Characters from the episode would later appear in the Armchair Theatre play Wednesday's Child in 1970, though the role of Shirley is played by Stephanie Beacham in Public Eye and Prunella Ransome in the Armchair Theatre episode (the other two overlapping roles are played by the same actors, however).

The Brighton series sees Marker establish a platonic friendship with Mrs Mortimer. Although he is told that she is a widow, she later confides in him that she has a husband who left her, and who she presumes is still alive. She tells the probation service she is a widow because she feels it would be more socially acceptable for a widow to be seen to take in ex-prisoners as lodgers—an interesting comment on the social attitudes of late-1960s England. Towards the end of the series, Marker works briefly for another enquiry agent, Rylands—in "The Comedian's Graveyard" he is hired to trace a young girl who has run away from her home and is now appearing in a run-down end-of-pier theatre act. Unthinkably for the character during the ABC episodes, he invites Mrs Mortimer out for an evening at the theatre, together with the girl's aunt who has hired him. The partnership with Rylands soon splits up as Marker finds his working methods intolerable and makes it clear he thinks Rylands is less than honest with his clients.

The final episode of the Brighton series was "A Fixed Address", broadcast (in monochrome) on 10 September 1969—although it was actually made in colour, as noted above (it is now shown in colour by Talking Pictures TV as part of the re-runs of the complete Brighton and Eton series). The series afforded a great deal of character development to secondary characters. Mrs Mortimer's estranged husband turns up on her doorstep claiming that he wants to restart their relationship. It transpires that his employers have offered him a lucrative post in an exotic overseas location—but only if he is a married man accompanied by his wife. The episode is notable for Marker setting up on his own again as an enquiry agent. The end credits are played over shots of him admiring his new (but still run-down and dingy) office. The end credits returned to the original theme music of previous series rather than the barer, more static arrangement that had been used especially for the Brighton episodes.

=== The Eton episodes ===
Thames commissioned a further series, this time of thirteen episodes, and the fifth series began on 5 July 1971. Several ITV companies in the early 1970s faced strike action as unions demanded better wages for handling the more complex colour broadcasting equipment. As a result, the first five episodes of series five were made in black and white although they were juggled around for transmission so that all five were not shown together.

The series opened with "A Mug Named Frank"; some months have passed since "A Fixed Address" and Marker is still living with Mrs Mortimer. She comments to him that his old problems are still present in Brighton—the police all know of him and of his record of being in prison. She also points out that, by his own admission, life has not been easy for Marker since he set up office on his own again and that he isn't getting much work. A chance encounter in a supermarket ultimately results in Marker making the decision to move to Eton. To emphasise this, the opening titles to the episode are those used for the Brighton series, whereas the closing credits play over a film of Marker walking around Windsor and Eton, as used for the rest of the series. The episode also introduces the new regular character of Detective Inspector Percy Firbank (played by Ray Smith)—a local police officer whose interest is piqued by Marker. The remaining 12 episodes of series 5 often explore the Marker-Firbank relationship in detail. Marker is very suspicious of authority figures, especially policemen, and Firbank—at least initially—considers enquiry agents to be a lower form of life. The two gradually come to like each other, even when their relationship is tested—the final episode of the series is "John VII, Verse 24" (29 September 1971) in which it appears Firbank is corrupt and is accepting money from known criminals.

Series 5 also demonstrates the variety that the programme could offer: in "Well—There Was This Girl, You See..." Marker again becomes involved in stolen jewels, but is exceptionally careful, too careful as it turns out, as his tactic of exerting pressure on a young man he thinks is involved backfires when he chooses to run to the police rather than Marker, and wrecks Marker's chances of getting a share of the reward money. An embarrassed Marker has to explain to an amused Firbank what has gone wrong.

In "Shades of White", Marker is hired to monitor the suspicious activities of an ambitious local businessman's daughter—he becomes friendly with the businessman's housekeeper but then has his trust betrayed (again) when it transpires the housekeeper is acting to receive items stolen by the daughter's friends.

Lighter moments in series 5 come with "Transatlantic Cousins" as a visiting American hires Marker to trace his English relatives, assisted by the tourist's daughter. They find out that the American family does have an English relative who has inherited a baronetcy but the daughter also discovers that, because of a previously unknown member of the family who was killed in a war, her father is actually the rightful inheritor of the title.

=== Marker's failed alliances ===
A further series of Eton-based episodes aired from 8 November 1972 to 14 February 1973, with the series now fully in colour. The final series began on 6 January 1975 with another arc of related episodes. Starting with "Nobody Wants To Know", Marker investigates a horse-doping racket being run by an organised criminal gang. He ignores warnings to drop the case, because he "doesn't like being bullied" but gets a serious beating-up for this.

The next episode, "How About a Cup of Tea?", recalls the Brighton era as Marker comes out of hospital and his friends (including Firbank and a returning Mrs Mortimer) attempt to rally round him and cheer him up. He tries to find a career other than enquiries but is told by an unhelpful job centre clerk (Robin Askwith) that he is too old to do anything new. The episode concentrates again on Marker and how, with his friends to help him, he pulls himself out of the negative cycle of self-pity and depression.

The final episode of the trilogy is "How About It, Frank?", in which he reluctantly takes revenge on those responsible for his beating up and narrowly avoids another encounter with the wrong side of the law. He enters into a partnership with another enquiry agent, Ron Gash (Peter Childs). Gash is an ex-policeman and, although much more likeable than Rylands (of the Brighton episodes) he does have very different ideas about the job from Marker. Although Marker would show interest in money if a large quantity of it appeared to be heading his way (such as "Well—There Was This Girl, You See ...") he never considers raising his fees to provide himself with a more comfortable living standard. Gash is far more profit-motivated and also considers Marker's shabby appearance to be off-putting to potential clients. Yet again Marker decides he doesn't like working with a partner, and in the episode "What's to Become of Us?" (10 February 1975) Gash and he part ways peacefully and amicably. For the final half-dozen episodes Marker relocates to Chertsey in Surrey, partly to avoid a clash of location with Gash's business.

The move to Chertsey sees the series return to its traditional format of a new case each week for Marker. In "Fit of Conscience" he is asked to investigate the collapse of a residential apartment block and it becomes apparent that the concrete has been incorrectly formulated. Those responsible for this, the primary cause of the collapse, leave the country and avoid being brought to British justice for their actions. The series often produced such downbeat endings, with the villains getting away with their crimes or at the very least, with the resolution unclear and further thought required on the part of the viewer.

== The end of the series, its fate and legacy ==
Public Eye came to an end on 7 April 1975 with the episode "Unlucky For Some". A hotel owner asks Marker to investigate his wife's odd behaviour. It transpires that her first husband is still alive and she is being blackmailed about this. Marker traces the first husband and plans to claim a large reward on offer for doing so, only to find that, 15 minutes before he could stake his claim, the blackmailer has carried out his threat and has therefore obtained the money. Marker is left with nothing and, ten years after he first appeared on British TV screens, Frank Marker still needs to take every case that comes his way in order to make ends meet.

Thames had not wanted to end the series at this point. The intention was that Euston Films, Thames' film-making subsidiary, would continue with an eighth and final series but would make it on film, rather than the PAL 625-line video format which it had been recorded on up till then. This made sense as Euston had a good track record, having scored major successes with Van der Valk, their revamped version of Special Branch, and The Sweeney. These were generally larger-scale, glossier and more 'action-packed' operations than the more intimate Public Eye. Alfred Burke, fearing that the move onto film would mean the series would lose its particular, low-key identity, decided not to take up the option.

Public Eye became largely forgotten and confined to archival oblivion for almost twenty years, despite being a popular favourite for a decade and a ratings-topper in its time. One episode ("Who Wants To Be Told Bad News?" from series 5) was repeated in 1989 to mark Thames Television's 21st anniversary, but thereafter nothing more happened. Thames then lost its franchise in controversial circumstances in 1992. Thames' successor Carlton Television considered remaking the series in the 1990s, but again nothing came of this. Recognition returned in 1995 when British satellite channel UK Gold (then part-owned by Thames) repeated all the colour Thames episodes from series 5 onwards. UK Gold had a policy of not showing any black and white material; thus the Brighton episodes and "Shades of White" remained unscreened.

A small group of British Television enthusiasts, Kaleidoscope, did much to promote the programme and negotiated the rights to rescreen, at conventions and meetings, many of the black-and-white Thames episodes and the remaining ABC episodes. They also unearthed a 1968 ABC promotional reel, on a long-obsolete domestic videotape format, which included a five-minute extract from the otherwise-missing third series episode "Must Be the Architecture, Can't Be the Climate" and audio recordings of several lost ABC episodes. Most notably, Kaleidoscope organised and hosted a 'Public Eye: Thirtieth Anniversary' convention in 1995. This was attended by Alfred Burke in person.

The television channel Talking Pictures TV began repeating the series from series 4 onwards in October 2018. It has been one of the station's "most popular screenings", according to a list in an article published in The Guardian in May 2020.

=== DVD release ===
Network Video issued the Brighton series in a three-DVD box set in mid-2004, complete with some restoration work. Bonus material included the complete ABC episode "Nobody Kills Santa Claus" and the above-mentioned extract from "Must Be The Architecture..." Sales of the box set were moderate; a follow-up four-disc set of Series 5, including the ABC episode "Don't Forget You're Mine", was released in December 2004. Network released the 1972/3 and 1975 series on DVD in 2008, and the remaining ABC material on 27 August 2012 (2-DVD set, Network/StudioCanal 7953731).

A 17-disc box set of every surviving episode, including a book on the making of the series by Andrew Pixley, plus interviews with Alfred Burke and surviving episode fragments and audio soundtracks, was released by Network Video in 2012. (A Box Named Frank, 7953697). This was re-released in 2023 as Public Eye: The Collection, minus the book.

An additional DVD, featuring a number of episodes that survive only as audio recordings was released in 2025 by Kaleidoscope.

== Theme music ==
The downbeat, moody theme music for the series was composed by Robert Sharples, writing under the pseudonym of Robert Earley. A slower-paced version of the theme music was used in the fourth series, before reverting to the original version for the remainder of the show's run.
