= Metro (British band) =

English rock band

- Metro circa 1977. From left to right: Godwin, Browne, Lyons

Background information
- Also known as: Public Zone
- Origin: United Kingdom
- Genres: Glam rock; art rock; power pop; new wave
- Years active: 1976–1980
- Labels: Transatlantic; Sire; EMI
- Past members: Peter Godwin; Duncan Browne; Sean Lyons; Colin Wight; Tony Adams; John Laforge

Metro were an English rock band, featuring Peter Godwin (vocals, saxophone, synthesizer), Duncan Browne (guitar, keyboards, vocals) and Sean Lyons (guitar). The band is best known for their song "Criminal World", which was covered by David Bowie on his 1983 album, Let's Dance.

== History ==
Godwin and Browne, who had both enjoyed modest success as solo artists in the early 1970s, formed Metro in 1976 and were later joined by Lyons. They recorded their self-titled debut album in 1976 and released it in 1977. The lead single off the record, "Criminal World", was banned from the BBC playlist due to its sexual content. During this time, the band briefly changed their name to Public Zone and released a single, "Naive", with The Police's Stewart Copeland on drums. Copeland declined an offer to become a permanent member of the band, to remain with The Police.

Following the release of their debut album, Browne departed the band to resume his solo career. Godwin and Lyons carried on with the addition of new members. Metro released New Love and Future Imperfect in 1979 and 1980, respectively. Following the demise of the band, Godwin embarked on a solo career, releasing his debut album, Images of Heaven, in 1982.

== Band members ==
- Peter Godwin – vocals, keyboards (1976—1980)
- Duncan Browne – guitar, keyboards, vocals, bass (1976—1978)
- Sean Lyons – guitar, piano, synthesizers (1976—1980)
- Colin Wight – guitar (1978—80)
- Tony Adams – bass, vocals (1978—80)
- John Laforge – drums (1978—80)

Timeline

== Discography ==
Studio albums

- Metro (1977)
- New Love (1979)
- Future Imperfect (1980)

Singles

- "Criminal World" / "Precious" (1977)
- "Christine" / "Cut Up" (1979)
- "Christine" / "Girls in Love" (1979)
- "Girls in Love" / "I Don't Wanna Dance" (1979)
- "Girls in Love" / "I Don't Wanna Dance" / "New Love" (1979)
- "The Mystery" / "Cut Up" (1979)
- "America in My Head" / "Alone" (1980)- AUS #81
- "Gemini" / "The Face" (1980)
