= Sebastian Graham Jones =

British actor and director (1947–2004)

Sebastian Graham-Jones
- Born: Peter Sebastian Graham-Jones; 1 August 1947; Bockhampton, (Note: There are several hamlets in Dorset called Bockhampton, all small, and the sources do not say which one this was.) Dorset, England
- Died: 18 July 2004 (aged 56); London, England
- Occupations: Actor, director
- Spouse: Victoria Fairbrother
- Partner(s): Gemma Jones; Susan Fleetwood; Alison Gee
- Children: 1

Peter Sebastian Graham-Jones (1 August 1947 – 18 July 2004) was a British actor and theatre and screen director known for such films and television series as Ace of Wands, Travelling Man, Because of the Cats, The Little Drummer Girl and Shadow of the Noose.

== Early life and education ==
Graham-Jones was born at Bockhampton, Dorset, son of Michael John Graham-Jones (1920–2011), of The Limes, Standlake, Oxfordshire, who worked for the British Council, and charity fundraiser Jennifer Juliet (1925–2002), daughter of Andrew Tomlinson. In 2003 his father established a charity, The Exuberant Trust, in honour of his wife, supporting young people's interest in the arts. Graham-Jones's paternal grandmother- she having married Cambridge-educated Army surgeon John Lawrence Graham Jones (1880–1946), of Bockhampton House, Stinsford, Dorset- was the suffragette Aileen Preston, who was the first woman to qualify for the Automobile Association Certificate in Driving and was chauffeur to Emmeline Pankhurst. Due to his father's work he spent some of his youth in Iran and India, and was educated at Harrow School, where he distinguished himself as a rugby player and cellist, before reading English and American literature at the newly-established University of Kent, where his enthusiasm and ability led to the formation of a drama department.

== Career ==
An actor and director of considerable talent who "shunned the limelight", Graham-Jones appeared in Kenneth Tynan's Oh! Calcutta! in 1970, where he met co-star Victoria Fairbrother, whom he married; subsequently in the West End he appeared in Getting On by Alan Bennett alongside Kenneth More and Gemma Jones, with whom he had a relationship of many years, and a son. He was best known during his time as assistant to National Theatre director Bill Bryden, major contributions including work on the staging of "outstanding" productions of plays by Eugene O'Neill, Tony Harrison's The Mysteries, and Keith Dewhurst's adaptations of Flora Thompson's trilogy, Lark Rise to Candleford, as two plays. Graham-Jones was "a gifted musician, teacher, radio producer and, latterly, a director in his own right"; he was placed in charge of the television soap opera Coronation Street for a short time, and played a major role in the making of Laurence Olivier's televised King Lear.

Prior to his death, he had been working at Cape Cod, directing Harold Pinter's No Man's Land, having been an assistant to Peter Hall on the first production at the National Theatre starring John Gielgud and Ralph Richardson. He also worked on Alan Ayckbourn's A Chorus of Disapproval at Cape Cod before his death.

== Personal life ==
Graham-Jones married Victoria Fairbrother; he had a relationship of many years with Gemma Jones, with whom he had a son, Luke, who works with film industry financiers and producers. He subsequently had a long-term relationship with the actress Susan Fleetwood until her death in 1995, and spent his last years with television drama producer Alison Gee. He died of cancer at the age of 56. His sister, Susanna, was the partner of Sir David Nabarro, with whom she had two sons and a daughter.
