= Peter Godwin (singer) =

British singer

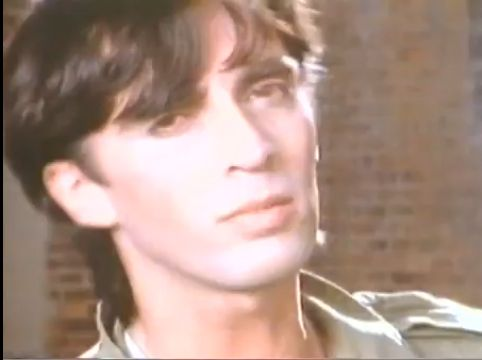

Peter Godwin is an English new wave musician. He was a member of the band Metro, as well as a solo artist and songwriter.

The Metro song "Criminal World", co-written by Godwin, was banned by the BBC on its initial release in 1977 due to bisexual overtones. Six years later, David Bowie covered "Criminal World" on his best-selling album, Let's Dance. Adam Sweeting of Melody Maker disliked the song, saying it made "a strong plea for bulk erasure", while in a 2011 review, BBC writer David Quantick called the song one of the best on the album. In 1982, Godwin's "Images of Heaven" became a "cult favorite on New Wave radio stations". The dance remix of his song "Baby's in the Mountains" was a big dance hit and described as "intricate but direct". Godwin's 1983 sole solo studio album, Correspondence was issued by Polydor Records.

In 1998, a number of his songs from his time with the band Metro, his early 1980s solo work, and a couple of new songs were released on CD titled Images of Heaven: The Best of Peter Godwin, released on Oglio Records. He wrote lyrics with a "spiritual bent" for Steve Winwood's 2008 album Nine Lives.

In late 2024, Godwin collaborated with Italian singer-songwriter dr.Gam, writing the lyrics for the single "Rise and Fall", followed in April 2025 by the duet "Vieni a Cambiare il Mondo" (both distributed by AWAL/Sony Music), which marked the first time Godwin performed vocals in the Italian language.

In the summer of 2025, Godwin took part in the United States tour "Lost 80s Live", performing alongside artists such as A Flock of Seagulls, Big Country, The Vapors, General Public, and China Crisis. The tour, curated by Richard Blade, spanned the country from the East to the West Coast, with stops at venues such as the Rooftop at Pier 17 in New York, the Saenger Theatre in New Orleans, and the Greek Theatre in Los Angeles.

== Discography ==
=== Solo albums ===
- Correspondence (1983)

=== Compilation albums ===
- Images of Heaven: The Best of Peter Godwin (1998)

=== Extended plays ===
- Dance Emotions (1982)
- Images of Heaven (1982)

=== with Metro ===
- Metro (1977)
- New Love (1979)
- Future Imperfect (1980)

=== with Nuevo ===
- Sunset Rise (2010)

=== Singles ===
- "Torch Songs for the Heroine" (1981)
- "Images of Heaven" (1982)
- "Luxury" (1982)
- "Cruel Heart" (1982)
- "Emotional Disguise" (1982)
- "Baby's in the Mountains" / "Soul of Love" (1983)
- "The Art of Love" (1983)
- "Rendezvous" (with Sasha) (1998)
- "The Big Fight" (written for Flavia Brilli's debut at The Hippodrome, London) (1986)
- "You!" (2020)
- "Vieni a Cambiare il Mondo" (2025) (with dr.Gam)

=== Writing credits ===
- David Bowie – "Criminal World" (1983)
- Steve Winwood – Nine Lives (2008)
- dr.Gam - "Rise and Fall" (2024)

== See also ==
- List of new wave artists
