= The Hour That Never Was =

- The Avengers episode
- Screen title
- Episode no.: Season 4 Episode 9
- Directed by: Gerry O'Hara
- Written by: Roger Marshall
- Original air dates: 23 November 1965 (Scottish Television); 27 November 1965 (ABC Weekend TV)

Guest appearances
- Gerald Harper; Dudley Foster; Roy Kinnear; Roger Booth; Daniel Moynihan

Episode chronology
← Previous "A Surfeit of H_{2}O"	Next → "Dial a Deadly Number"

"The Hour That Never Was" is the ninth episode of the fourth series of the 1960s cult British spy-fi television series The Avengers, starring Patrick Macnee and Diana Rigg. It was first broadcast by Scottish Television on Tuesday 23 October 1965. ABC Weekend Television, who commissioned the show, broadcast it in its own regions four days later on Saturday 27 October. The episode was directed by Gerry O'Hara and written by Roger Marshall.

== Plot ==
Steed and Mrs Peel swerve to avoid a dog and crash into a tree. The clock in the car smashes and stops just before 11 o'clock. Steed knows the area well and the two set out on foot to visit an old RAF base. They enter the lounge and find it set for a party but everyone is absent. They do not yet notice that the clock has stopped at 11 and the fish in the tank have frozen still. Outside they find an unattended car at a petrol pump with petrol flooding from it. The other buildings of the base are empty and a milk float is abandoned. Seeing the name Geoffrey in the book, they visit his quarters and also find it empty and an electric shaver still running. They find the air control tower empty and then spot the milkman fleeing across the tarmac. He is shot dead.

Looking for the culprit, they find a rabbit alive but unconscious, and later the body of the milkman disappears. Steed and Mrs Peel separate and investigate the base further. Mrs Peel discovers the body of the milkman on his float just as a deafening shrill noise and quake shakes through the base. When the noise eventually stops, Steed returns to the lounge to get himself a drink at the bar, whereupon he discovers the frozen fish and stopped clock. Outside he discovers a vagrant looking in the dustbins. Steed gives him a drink in the lounge and the vagrant says he also experienced the shrill noise. A dog enters which belongs to the gate tender and is known to the vagrant. Steed approaches the gate house and is struck unconscious by a falling barrier.

The scene then returns to the crashed car and Steed emerging from it as if the crash had just happened. Mrs Peel is missing. Steed returns to the base and finds the lounge bustling with activity; he is greeted by old comrades. They tell Steed that Mrs Peel had rung, telling them that she was unable to attend, and they say there is no tramp living on the premises. Outside Steed discovers the dog who leads him to the dead body of the tramp, just as the milkman drives off (with the body of the original milkman on the back). The milkman takes the body into the cook house. When Steed approaches he finds the apparently dead milkman alive and well and busy. The milkman and an accomplice take out new bodies from the medical centre and put them on the back of the float. Steed investigates the clinic. He overpowers a guard and discovers Mrs Peel tied up and unable to recall anything since the accident. Looking at the equipment, Mrs Peel surmises that the people in the airbase had been hypnotized and programmed to potentially create sabotage. As Steed plays with a dental drill, the people in the lounge hear the shrill deafening noise over the speakers as he and Mrs Peel realize what has happened.

One of Steed's old friends and an accomplice show themselves and hold Steed and Mrs Peel at gunpoint. They reveal a plan to auction off the 30 hypnotically programmed military people to the highest bidder. Steed and Mrs Peel overcome these criminals but not before laughing gas is set off leaving them in hysterics.

== Cast ==
- Patrick Macnee as John Steed
- Diana Rigg as Emma Peel
- Gerald Harper as Geoffrey Ridsdale
- Dudley Foster as Philip Leas
- Roy Kinnear as Benedict Napoleon Hickey
- Roger Booth as "Porky" Purser
- Daniel Moynihan as Corporal Barman
- David Morrell as Wiggins
- Fred Haggerty as Driver
- Ray Austin as dead milkman (uncredited)
- Charles Rayford as the cook (uncredited)
- Cliff Diggins as a thug (uncredited)
- Royston Farrell as an Officer (uncredited)
- Terence Plummer as equipment operator (uncredited)

== Production ==
Production for the episode was completed from 5 July to 20 July 1965. In the production set of the airfield buildings, the designer purposefully opted for a "meiosis," creating "an effect not simply of diurnal normality but of deliberate neutrality," to create the atmosphere of abandonment. Ray Austin, an ITC regular director, had an uncredited cameo role in the episode as the dead milkman.
