= Law & Order (British TV series) =

1978 British TV crime drama series

- Genre: Crime drama; police procedural
- Created by: G. F. Newman
- Directed by: Les Blair
- Starring: Peter Dean; Derek Martin; Deirdre Costello; Billy Cornelius; Alan Ford; Ken Campbell; Fred Haggerty
- Country of origin: United Kingdom
- Original language: English
- No. of series: 1
- No. of episodes: 4

Production
- Producer: Tony Garnett
- Cinematography: John Else
- Editor: Don Fairservice
- Running time: 80 minutes
- Production company: BBC Worldwide

Original release
- Network: BBC Two
- Release: 6 April – 27 April 1978

Law & Order (often referred to as Law and Order) is a British television crime drama series, comprising four connected plays written by G. F. Newman and directed by Les Blair, which was first broadcast on 6 April 1978 on BBC Two. Each of the four stories within the series is told from a different perspective, including that of the Detective, the Villain, the Brief and the Prisoner. The series was highly controversial upon its release due to its depiction of a corrupt British police force and legal system.

== Cast ==
- Peter Dean as Jack Lynn
- Derek Martin as D.I. Fred Pyall
- Deirdre Costello as Cathy Lynn
- Billy Cornelius as D.S. Eric Lethridge
- Alan Ford as Clifford Harding
- Ken Campbell as Alex Gladwell
- Fred Haggerty as D.C.I. Tony Simmons
- Geoffrey Todd as D.C. Peter Fenton
- Alan Davidson as Benny Isaacs
- Tony Barouch as Collin Coleman

=== A Detective's Tale ===
- David Stockton as D.S. Tony Shields
- Tom de Ville as D.I. Frank Polden
- Dominic Allan as D.C.I. Chatt (A.10)
- Terry Walsh as D.I. John Redvers
- John Hogan as D.S. Ian Middlewick
- Chris Hallam as D.S. Lewis
- Steve Kelly as Maurice Dickinson
- Bill Dean as David Shepley
- Stanley Price as Brian Finch
- Roy Sone as Micky Fielder
- Cy Wallis as Billy Little
- David Harris as Witness
- Val Clover as Telephonist
- Michael Sheard as Insurance Assessor
- Byron Sotiris as Duty Sergeant
- Stewart Harwood as P.C. Malcolm
- Colin Howells as D.C. Roger Humphreys
- Robert Oates as D.C. Warren Salter
- Doug Sheldon as D.S. Jack Barcy

=== A Villain's Tale ===
- Colin Howells as D.C. Roger Humphreys
- Robert Oates as D.C. Warren Salter
- Johnny Feltwell as D.C. Matthew Hall
- Alan Clarke as D.C. Ray Jenkins
- Mike Horsburgh as D.I. Graham McHale
- Doug Sheldon as D.S. Jack Barcy
- Mike Cummings as Tommy Haines
- John Bardon as Del Rogers
- Alf Coster as Philip Hayes
- Barry Summerford as John Tully
- John Blackburn as Security Guard
- Frank Henson as Security Guard
- Peter Craze as T.D.C. Peter Footring
- Martin Gordon as Mr. English
- Reg Woods as Ronnie
- John Cannon as Duty Sergeant

=== A Brief's Tale ===
- Terence Bayler as Michel Messick Q.C.
- André van Gyseghem as Judge Robert Quigley
- Michael Griffiths as Horace McMillan Q.C.
- Peter Welch as Brian Harpenden-Smith Q.C.
- Jeffrey Segal as Stanley Eaton Q.C.
- Peter Craze as T.D.C. Peter Footring
- Jason White as D.C. Simon Brent
- Barry Summerford as John Tully
- Frank Henson as Frank Ryan
- Martin Gordon as Mr. English
- Jean Leppard as Margaret Lloyd
- Stanley McGeagh as Gladwell's Clerk
- Laurence Harrington as Derek Wisby
- Eric Mason as D.S. Ted Collinson
- Brian Hawksley as Magistrate
- James Charlton as Warder in Old Bailey

=== A Prisoner's Tale ===
- Edward Cast as Governor Maudling
- Roger Booth as Chief Officer Carne
- Farrell Sheridan as Principal Officer McClean
- Gil Sutherland as Principal Officer Allen
- Harry Walker as Dr. Eynshaw
- Robert Bill as Micky Dunkerton
- Bruce White as Bob Mark
- Myles Reitherman as Mervyn Latimer
- Gilbert MacIntyre as Baylis
- Lloyd McGuire as P.O. Jordan
- Dave Atkins as P.O. Dorman
- Ronan Paterson as P.O. Westbury
- Graham Gough as P.O. Powell
- Laurence Foster as Senior Officer Walters
- Max Latimer as Prison Officer, Visiting Room
- Stanley McGeagh as Trevor Reid
- Stanley Illsley as Visiting Committee
- Terry Yorke as Police Sergeant, A.10
- Dominic Allan as Inspector Chatt, A.10
- Alf Roberts as Prison Officer, Punishment Block
- Ian Munro as Prison Officer, Punishment Block
- Mark Warren as Prison Officer, Legal Visiting Room
- Colin Taylor as Prison Officer, Visiting Room
- Steve Emerson as Prison Officer, Legal Visiting Room
- Harry Landis as M.P.
- Pauline Wynn as Visiting Committee

== Episodes ==
No.	Title	Directed by	Written by	British air date
1	"A Detective's Tale"	Les Blair	G.F. Newman	6 April 1978
Detective Inspector Fred Pyall (Derek Martin) is open to corruption from villains and operates a system of 'checks and balances' where certain villains get brought to justice and some do not. After a meeting with his informant Mickey Fielder (Roy Stone), Pyall discovers that Jack Lynn (Peter Dean), a villain from Kentish Town, is putting together an armed robbery of a supermarket in Putney. Prior to this Pyall had arrested Clifford Harding (Alan Ford), following a police raid of his home, which recovered an illegal firearm. Harding agrees to bribe Pyall to walk away from the firearms charge. Pyall however knows he can get more out of Harding and later on uses Harding's relationship with Lynn to make him turn informant and gain further information about the supermarket robbery. Pyall's informant Fielder reveals the date and time of Lynn's robbery but for some reason it does not happen. Pyall however is determined to nail Lynn and is willing to resort to 'fit up' tactics to gain a conviction - even if he has not actually committed the crime in question. Add to this a cosy relationship with corrupt lawyer Alex Gladwell (Ken Campbell), and a seemingly blind eye to his activities from superiors within Scotland Yard. It seems Pyall is almost a law unto himself.
2	"A Villain's Tale"	Les Blair	G.F. Newman	13 April 1978
After two of his 'firm' are arrested for an unconnected armed robbery, Jack Lynn is short of personnel and sets about recruiting for the supermarket robbery. He approaches longtime associate John Tully (Barry Summerford), who is interested but has already made commitments to a 'firm' planning an armed raid on a British Gas depot in Romford. Lynn continues with his plans recruiting Tommy Haines (Mike Cummings), to act as a backup man, and procures firearms from Philip Hayes, an arms dealer with a middle-class grocer front (Alf Coster). Lynn stores the weapons at a lock-up garage that he rented in a false name, and is ready to go. However he is under pressure from his wife Cathy (Deirdre Costello), to give up his life of crime and go straight. Furthermore, Lynn discovers Micky Fielder is Pyall's informant and has given Pyall details of their supermarket robbery. Lynn decides to postpone the robbery and take retribution against Fielder for informing, giving him a severe beating and smashing his kneecaps.
3	"A Brief's Tale"	Les Blair	G.F. Newman	20 April 1978
Alex Gladwell, brought in to represent Jack Lynn, will use any means to get his client off.
4	"A Prisoner's Tale"	Les Blair	G.F. Newman	27 April 1978
Lynn is sent down, but rehabilitation is not on the agenda.

== Controversy ==
The series was highly controversial upon its release due to its depiction of corrupt British law enforcement and legal systems. There was such an outcry regarding the series in the British press that the BBC was prevented from trying to sell the series abroad.

John Cooper, QC, writing in The Times in 2018, described the series as 'seismic', saying that 'at the time [the plays] provoked calls from MPs for Newman to be arrested for sedition and the summoning of the director-general of the BBC to the Home Office to explain himself.'

== Critical reception ==
A review by Matteo Sedazzari in May 2018 concluded: 'it's such a shame that the BBC seriously do not produce dramas like this anymore, thought-provoking, brutal and powerful', and Adam Sweeting in The Spectator described it as 'compellingly plausible'.

Jasper Rees wrote for the Arts Desk in May 2018 'Law and Order more than earns this 40th-anniversary trip down memory's stinking back alley'.

The series was discussed on BBC Radio 4's programme Thinking Allowed on 23 May 2018, with the host Laurie Taylor talking to criminologist Tim Newburn and Charlotte Brunsden, Professor of Film & Television Studies at the University of Warwick, along with the author, to engage with the question of 'the extent to which... [the series] created a public and political debate which produced positive reform'.

Among the series' successors was the BBC TV series Police.

== Subsequent broadcasts ==
For the series' thirtieth anniversary in April 2008, it was released on a limited edition DVD via 2 Entertain. In April 2018, BBC Four announced that the series would be rebroadcast on television for the first time to mark the series' fortieth anniversary. This statement was inaccurate, as a full repeat had previously been broadcast on BBC4 from 24 March to 14 April 2009 and it had also been repeated in March 1980. The 2018 repeats began at 10:00pm on Thursdays from 12 April 2018. It was further broadcast on 10 July 2024, preceded by G.F. Newman's reflections, explanation of what inspired him, and the responses of police officers at the time.

== Book series ==
In parallel, the 'Law & Order' series of books was a trilogy of works written by Newman, first published by Sphere in 1977 and then reprinted in Sphere Paperbacks in 1978. The trilogy consists of 'A Detective's Tale', ISBN 9780722163498, 'A Villain's Tale', ISBN 978-0722163634, and 'A Prisoner's Tale', ISBN 978-0722163641. An omnibus edition including all three was published in 1984 by HarperCollins, ISBN 9780586057834.
