= Talfryn Thomas =

Welsh actor (1922–1982)

- Thomas as Mr Cheeseman in Dad's Army
- Born: John Talfryn Thomas; 31 October 1922; Swansea, Wales
- Died: 4 November 1982 (aged 60); Cardiff, Wales
- Occupation: Actor

John Talfryn Thomas (31 October 1922 – 4 November 1982) was a British character actor from Swansea, Wales, best known for supporting roles on television in the 1970s, including those of Private Cheeseman in Dad's Army (1973–1974) and Tom Price in Survivors (1975), while Thomas also appeared with Jon Pertwee in two Doctor Who serials.

== Biography ==
John Talfryn Thomas was born in Swansea on 31 October 1922. He trained as an instrument mechanic but joined the local amateur dramatic society. During World War II, he joined the Royal Air Force (RAF), and was a rear gunner on a Lancaster bomber, flying on multiple raids into Germany. After surviving a crash in which all the other crew members were killed, he took up acting partly as therapy to cope with the trauma, before training as an actor in the London Academy of Music and Dramatic Art (LAMDA).

For some time Thomas acted in provincial theatres. In the late 1950s, he began making television appearances, and in the 1960s appeared in two episodes of The Avengers - "A Surfeit of H_{2}O" (1965) and "Look Stop Me" (1968) alongside stars Patrick Macnee, Diana Rigg and Linda Thorson - as well as appearing with Roger Moore in The Saint (1968), an uncredited rôle in The Champions in the episode "The Body Snatchers" (1969), and in The Persuaders! (as The Poacher in the episode "A Home Of One's Own", 1971). In 1973, Thomas appeared in the Seven of One episode "I'll Fly You for a Quid", appearing alongside Ronnie Barker in a community of Welsh gamblers. Thomas also appeared with Jon Pertwee in the Doctor Who serials, Spearhead from Space (1970) and The Green Death (1973), and in the Worzel Gummidge episode "The Scarecrow Wedding" (1980). Thomas excelled at playing quirky and sometimes seedy Welshmen. His distinctive appearance was enhanced by his protruding front teeth, which earned him the nickname 'Talf The Teef'. Thomas is perhaps best remembered for his role as Mr. Cheeseman in one series of the television comedy Dad's Army (1973-1974).

In 1975, Thomas appeared as Tom Price in seven episodes of the first series of the BBC TV series, Survivors, acting alongside main stars Carolyn Seymour, Ian McCulloch and Lucy Fleming, before the character of Tom was killed off in the tenth episode of the first series. In 1979, Thomas appeared on The Ken Dodd Laughter Show with Rita Webb and Pat Ashton (and he was a regular on Ken Dodd's BBC radio comedy show).

Talfryn Thomas' few films included Sky West and Crooked (1965) starring Hayley Mills, and Andrew Sinclair's adaptation of Dylan Thomas's Under Milk Wood (1971), with Richard Burton, Elizabeth Taylor and Peter O'Toole. Like Burton, Talfryn Thomas had been in the BBC radio play. He was also seen in Come Play with Me (1977) and the cult film, Sir Henry at Rawlinson End (1980) from Vivian Stanshall.

Thomas died of a heart attack on 4 November 1982, four days after his 60th birthday.

== Selected television roles ==
Year	Title	Role	Notes
1960	The Citadel	Chenkin's Henchman / Miner	3 episodes
1964 to 1974	Z Cars	McCall / Greenough / Jake Morris	7 episodes
1965	The Avengers	Eli Barker	Episode: "A Surfeit of H2O"
1966	The Saint	Owen Thomas	Episode: "The House on Dragon's Rock"
1967	St. Ives	Clausel	4 episodes
1967	The Flower of Gloster	Evans	3 episodes
1968	The Ronnie Barker Playhouse	Lecher Lewis	Episode: "Tennyson"
1968	The Avengers	Fiery Frederick	Episode: "Look Stop Me"
1970	Doctor Who – Spearhead from Space	Mullins	1 episode
1970	Tales of Unease	Official	Episode: "The Black Goddess"
1971	The Persuaders!	The Poacher	Episode: "A Home of One's Own"
1971	Play For Today	Tramp	Episode: "Edna, the Inebriate Woman"
1971 to 1972	Coronation Street	Dirty Dick	6 episodes
1971 to 1972	Tottering Towers	Prayer-book Perce	13 episodes
1972	The Onedin Line	Thomas	Episode: "Survivor"
1973	Doctor Who – The Green Death	Davis	3 episodes
1973	Seven of One	Mr Pugh	Episode: "I'll Fly You for a Quid"
1973 to 1974	Dad's Army	Private Cheeseman	6 episodes
1974	Men of Affairs	Dick	Episode: "...As a New Born Babe"
1975	Survivors	Tom Price	7 episodes
1975	Get Some In!	Corporal White	Episode: "Call Up"
1977	Treasure Island	Tom Morgan	4 episodes
1977	King of the Castle	Vine / Vein	7 episodes
1979	The Ken Dodd Laughter Show	Various	6 episodes
1980	Worzel Gummidge –	Soggy Boggart	Episode: "The Scarecrow Wedding"
1980	Cowboys	Demolition Foreman	Episode: "Remember Honky Stubbs"
1981	The Incredible Mr Tanner	Cledwyn	Episode: "The Wallet"
1982	Hi-de-Hi!	Gareth Davies	Episode: "Stripes"

== Films ==
- Sky West and Crooked (1966) - Brand
- Under Milk Wood (1971) - Mr. Pugh
- The Battle of Billy's Pond (1976) - Mr. Pugh
- Come Play with Me (1977) - Nosegay
- Sir Henry at Rawlinson End (1980) - Teddy Tidy
