= A Surfeit of H2O =

"A Surfeit of H_{2}O"
- The Avengers episode
- Screen title
- Episode no.: Season 4 Episode 8
- Directed by: Sidney Hayers
- Written by: Colin Finbow
- Original air dates: 16 November 1965 (Scottish Television); 20 November 1965 (ABC Weekend TV)

Guest appearances
- Noel Purcell; Albert Lieven; Sue Lloyd; Talfryn Thomas; John Kidd; Geoffrey Palmer

Episode chronology
← Previous "The Murder Market"	Next → "The Hour That Never Was"

"A Surfeit of H_{2}O" is the eighth episode of the fourth series of the 1960s cult British spy-fi television series The Avengers, starring Patrick Macnee and Diana Rigg. It was first broadcast by Scottish Television on Tuesday 16 November 1965. ABC Weekend Television, who commissioned the show, broadcast it in its own regions four days later on Saturday 20 November 1965. The episode was directed by Sidney Hayers and written by Colin Finbow.

== Plot ==
A local poacher is drowned in a field during a sudden heavy deluge of rain. Steed and Mrs Peel investigate and discover that this is a frequent occurrence in the area. Mrs Peel visits the Welsh brother of the poacher, Eli, who informs them that his brother was an alcoholic and used to steal from a local distillery which also has a massive supply of spring water in its tanks. Steed visits a prophet-like old eccentric named Jonah who has been writing to The Times, foreseeing the floods in the village and talking of a "great flood coming" and seemingly believes himself to be Noah, building his own ark. Jonah claims to see the same cloud in the sky every day.

Mrs Peel visits the distillery, whimsically named Grannys Groggs, and finds the man in charge, Dr. Sturm, very unfriendly and quick to get rid of her. On leaving she sees a rack full of trench coats and umbrellas. Eli arranges with Mrs Peel to break into the distillery at night through one of the storage huts. Steed revisits Jonah who curiously asks Steed if Mrs Peel is a very sinful woman because of a comment she gave him that she was "going into the pit of iniquity". Mrs Peel arrives at the distillery to meet Eli and discovers he has been drowned.

Steed arrives to meet the doctor at the distillery, looking to "buy some wine", and encounters an attractive female employee who tells him that the doctor does not like people prying. However, the doctor believes Steed to be a top wine connoisseur and allows him to look around the distillery. Steed tastes the wine with the female employee and tries to get information from her about the "heavy rain" but to no avail. Steed and Mrs Peel revisit the field near the distillery, where Jonah keeps seeing the same cloud appearing. Peel discovers the relative humidity is so unusually high, 67.8%, that it is similar to the jungles of the Amazon. They report their findings to a top meteorologist, Sir Arnold Kelly, who has arrived in the area and is quite incredulous and is convinced the equipment is faulty. They return to the site and find the equipment has been tampered with. Steed returns to the distillery and catches the doctors moving a tub of dry ice. He tastes more wine and in doing so hears the sound of rain and sees a locked room, evidently full of ice. Steed returns to the doctor and enquires about the sound of rain and discovers that they are hiding something and force him to leave.

The doctors discover the meteorologist taking samples in the field and drown him in a torrent of rain. The doctor is aware of his identity and of Jonah and Mrs Peel and dispatches some men to invite Mrs Peel to revisit the distillery. Mrs Peel is held at gunpoint at Jonah's barn and taken to the factory and placed on the high tech wine press machine to force her to tell them what she knows. A foreman from the distillery stays at Jonah's barn and is "converted" by Jonah who later tells Steed and that Mrs Peel is missing. Steed discovers that Jonah's ark was tampered with by the foreman and that it was intended to kill Jonah.

Steed and Jonah revisit the field and hear the sound of water. They discover a manhole hidden underneath the grass and go down and explore underground. They discover the body of Kelly and overhear Dr. Sturm talking to Mrs Peel about his plans through the vent to the distillery and that he intends to sell his rainmaking device to a military nation of the highest bidder and describes it as the greatest weapon since the atomic bomb, a "great flood". Steed and Jonah enter the distillery through the vent when the doctor departs, and free Mrs Peel from the machine. They enter the "rain" room and fight with the distillery workers in the soaking wet environment. Dr. Sturm overblows the machine and kills himself to avoid the secret being stolen.

== Cast ==
- Patrick Macnee as John Steed
- Diana Rigg as Emma Peel
- Noel Purcell as Jonah Barnard
- Albert Lieven as Dr. Sturm
- Sue Lloyd as Joyce Jason
- Talfryn Thomas as Eli Barker
- John Kidd as Sir Arnold Kelly
- Geoffrey Palmer as Martin Smythe

== Production ==
Production for the episode was completed from 30 April to 11 May 1965. The 1998 film The Avengers also featured a weather-controlling machine as the primary threat to be dealt with.
