= Annemarie, the Bride of the Company =

1932 film

- Directed by: Carl Boese
- Written by: Bobby E. Lüthge; Károly Nóti
- Produced by: Gustav Althoff
- Starring: Lucie Englisch; Paul Heidemann; Albert Paulig
- Cinematography: Willy Hameister
- Edited by: Hilde Grebner
- Music by: Otto Urack
- Production company: Aco-Film
- Distributed by: Albö-Film
- Release date: 28 October 1932
- Running time: 75 minutes
- Country: Germany
- Language: German

Annemarie, the Bride of the Company (German: Annemarie, die Braut der Kompanie) is a 1932 German comedy film directed by Carl Boese and starring Lucie Englisch, Paul Heidemann and Albert Paulig. It was shot at the Babelsberg Studios in Berlin. The film's sets were designed by the art director Willi Herrmann.

== Cast ==
- Lucie Englisch as Annemarie
- Paul Heidemann as Oberleutnant Rupp
- Albert Paulig as von Brenken
- Walter Schlott as Leutnant Specht
- Rudolf Schündler as Leutnant Williams
- Albert Lieven as Fähnrich Werner v. Schumann
- Paul Hörbiger as Musketier Karl Lehmann
- Hugo Fischer-Köppe as Feldwebel Siegert
- Gudrun Ady as Margot Domke
- Gertrud Wolle as Fräulein v. Rabenau
- Ilse Nast as Lilly
- Hermann Picha as Gesangslehrer Schubert
- Fritz Alberti
- Hildegard Fränzel

== Bibliography ==
- Bock, Hans-Michael; Bergfelder, Tim, eds. (2009). The Concise Cinegraph: Encyclopaedia of German Cinema. New York: Berghahn Books. ISBN 978-1-57181-655-9.
- Jacobsen, Wolfgang. Babelsberg: das Filmstudio. Argon, 1994.
- Klaus, Ulrich J. Deutsche Tonfilme: Jahrgang 1932. Klaus-Archiv, 1988.
