= Albert Lieven =

German actor (1906–1971)

- Born: Albert Fritz Liévin; 22 June 1906; Hohenstein, East Prussia, German Empire
- Died: 22 December 1971 (aged 65); London, England
- Occupation: Actor
- Years active: 1932–1971
- Spouses: Tania Lieven (m. 1933; div. 19??); Valerie White (m. 1944; div. 194?); Susan Shaw (m. 1949; div. 1953) Petra Peters (m. 1955; div. 19??)
- Family: Toby Flood (grandson)

Albert Lieven (born Albert Fritz Liévin; 22 June 1906 – 22 December 1971) was a German actor.

== Early life ==
Lieven was born in Hohenstein, German Empire. His father was the head physician of the Tuberculosis sanatorium Hohenstein, where Lieven grew up. He started to study medicine but stopped the studies for financial reasons.

== Career ==
Lieven started his career at theaters in Gera and Königsberg. His first screen role was in the German film Annemarie, die Braut der Kompanie (Bride of the Company) in 1932. During the next four years, he appeared in another sixteen films, including the German film adaptation of Charley's Aunt.

Owing to the rise of the Nazi Party in Germany and his wife Tatjana being Jewish, they moved to Britain in 1937. However, he spent the years of the Second World War mainly in roles depicting Nazis in British films, not finding them overly challenging as an actor.

Lieven appeared on the London stage in 1939 in the comedy Rake's Progress (not the later Rex Harrison film of the same title) but was largely acting in films (among them The Life and Death of Colonel Blimp, 1943). In 1943, he appeared in the West End production The Lisbon Story.

Lieven appeared in many cinema productions, and in 1940, he was credited in seven, in all of which he played the role of a German.

He was under contract to Rank for five years from 1945. It has been claimed that he only appeared in one film during this contract, Sleeping Car to Trieste. In fact, however, he appeared in several other films for companies controlled by Rank during this period, as part of his contract. These included Marry Me! (1949), which was made for Gainsborough Pictures, and Frieda (1947), made for Ealing Studios, both of which were subsidiaries of Rank.

He returned to Germany in 1951, and appeared in many films made there. He also was in films both in Britain and Hollywood.

== Family ==
Married four times, Lieven is the grandfather of the England rugby union player and coach Toby Flood. Lieven died in London.

== Selected filmography ==
- Annemarie, die Braut der Kompanie (1932) as Fähnrich Werner v. Schumann
- I by Day, You by Night (1932) as Wolf
- Kampf um Blond (1933) as Victor
- Ripening Youth (1933) as Knud Sengebusch, Abiturient
- Die vom Niederrhein (1933) as Hans Steinherr
- Es tut sich was um Mitternacht (1934) as Nikolaus 'Nicki' Durmann
- Charley's Aunt (1934) as Jack Chesney
- Krach um Jolanthe (1934) as Wesemeier, der neue Lehrer
- Miss Liselott (1934) as Peter Wendt, Architekt
- Trouble with Jolanthe (1934) as Wesemeier, der neue Lehrer
- Eine Siebzehnjährige (1934) as Walter
- Glückspilze (1935) as Hans Berding
- Hermine and the Seven Upright Men (1935) as Karl
- Make Me Happy (1935) as William Davenport
- Carnival in Flanders (1936) as Johann Brueghel
- Kater Lampe (1936) as Fritz Neumerkel – Schnitzergeselle
- A Woman of No Importance (1936) as Gerald Arbuthnot
- Victoria the Great (1937) as Minor Role (uncredited)
- The Deacon and the Jewess (1939) as Simon
- Spy for a Day (1940) as Capt. Hausemann
- For Freedom (1940) as Fritz
- Convoy (1940) as U-Boat Commander U.37
- Let George Do It! (1940) as German Radio Operator (uncredited)
- Night Train to Munich (1940) as Concentration Camp Guard (uncredited)
- Neutral Port (1940) as Capt. Grosskraft
- Mr. Proudfoot Shows a Light (1941) as German
- Jeannie (1941) as Count von Wittgestein
- The Big Blockade (1942) as German: Gunter
- The Young Mr. Pitt (1942) as Talleyrand
- The Life and Death of Colonel Blimp (1943) as von Ritter
- The Yellow Canary (1943) as Captain Jan Orlock
- English Without Tears (1944) as Felix Dembrowski
- The Seventh Veil (1945) as Maxwell Leydon
- Beware of Pity (1946) as Lt. Anton Marek
- Frieda (1947) as Richard
- Sleeping Car to Trieste (1948) as Zurta
- Marry Me! (1949) as Louis (uncredited)
- The Dark Light (1951) as Mark
- Hotel Sahara (1951) as Lt von Heillicke
- The Dubarry (1951) as Alfred Collien
- Klettermaxe (1952) as Max Malien
- Fritz and Friederike (1952) as Henry de Voss
- Desperate Moment (1953) as Paul Ravitch
- The Rose of Stamboul (1953) as Achmed Bey
- Beloved Life (1953) as Joachim von Bolin
- Homesick for Germany (1954) as Fred Berger
- Spring Song (1954) as Dr. Andermatt
- The Confession of Ina Kahr (1954) as Dr. Pleyer
- The Song of Kaprun (1955) as Peter Dahle
- Des Teufels General (1955) as Oberst Friedrich Eilers
- Ripening Youth (1955) as Studienrat Dr. Crusius
- The Fisherman from Heiligensee (1955) as Wolfgang von Döring
- Night of Decision (1956) as Albert Vernon
- Loser Takes All (1956) as Hotel Manager
- The House of Intrigue (1956) as Matt
- The Battalion in the Shadows (1957)
- All the Sins of the Earth (1958) as Judge
- Und abends in die Scala (1958) as Pierre de Motestant
- Subway in the Sky (1959) as Carl
- Conspiracy of Hearts (1960) as Col. Horstein
- Brainwashed (1960) as Hartmann
- Foxhole in Cairo (1960) as Gen. Erwin Rommel
- Frau Irene Besser (1961)
- The Guns of Navarone (1961) as Commandant
- The Devil's Daffodil (1961) as Raymond Lyne
- Das Halstuch (1962, TV miniseries) as Terry Morris
- Death Trap (Edgar Wallace Mysteries, 1962) as Paul Heindrick
- The Devil's Agent (1962), as Inspector Huebling
- Freddy and the Song of the South Pacific (1962) as Siebzehnstern
- Mystery Submarine (1963) as Captain Neymarck
- The Victors (1963) as Herr Metzger
- Death Drums Along the River (1963) as Dr. Franz Weiss
- Traitor's Gate (1964) as Trayne
- Die Schlüssel (1965, TV miniseries) as Detective Inspector Hyde
- City of Fear (1965) as Dr. Paul Kovac
- African Gold (1965) as Karl Du Val
- The Avengers, episode 4-9 (A Surfeit of H2O) (1965) as Dr. Sturm
- The Gorilla of Soho (1968) as Henry Parker
- Wie ein Blitz (1970, TV miniseries) as Gordon Stewart
- Die Feuerzangenbowle (1970) as Member of the Round table
