= Tannenberg Memorial =

Former German monument in East Prussia

- Olsztynek, present-day Poland
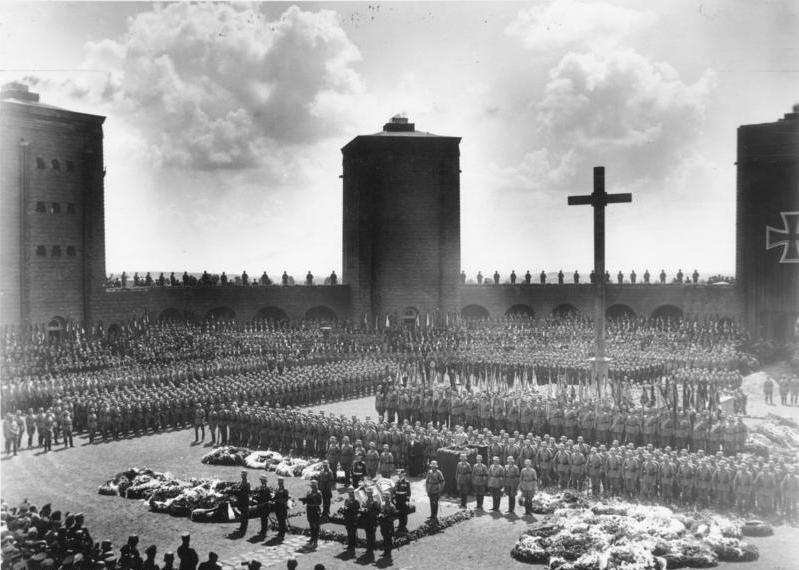
- View of the Memorial in 1934 (Funeral for the first burial of Generalfeldmarschall Hindenburg)

Site information
- Open to the public: Yes
- Condition: Virtually all traces gone

Location
- Coordinates: 53°34′53″N 20°15′39″E

Site history
- Built: 1924–1927
- Built by: Johannes and Walter Krüger, Berlin
- Demolished: 1945, 1950, 1980s

The Tannenberg Memorial (German: Tannenberg-Nationaldenkmal, from 1935: Reichsehrenmal-Tannenberg) was a monument to the German soldiers of the Battle of Tannenberg and the First Battle of the Masurian Lakes during World War I, as well as the medieval Battle of Tannenberg of 1410. The victorious German commander Generalfeldmarschall Paul von Hindenburg became a national hero and was later interred at the site.

Dedicated by Hindenburg in 1924, on the tenth anniversary of the Battle of Tannenberg near Hohenstein (now Olsztynek, Poland), the structure, which was financed by donations, was built by the architects Johannes and Walter Krüger of Berlin, and completed in 1927. The octagonal layout with eight towers, each 20 metres high, was influenced by Holy Roman Emperor Frederick II's Castel del Monte and Stonehenge.

When Reichspräsident Hindenburg died in 1934, his coffin and that of his wife, who had died in 1921, were placed there despite his wishes to be buried at his family plot in Hanover. Adolf Hitler ordered that the monument be redesigned and renamed "Reichsehrenmal Tannenberg". As the Red Army approached in 1945, German troops removed Hindenburg's remains and partly demolished key structures. In 1949, the Polish authorities razed the site, leaving few traces.

== Concept and design ==
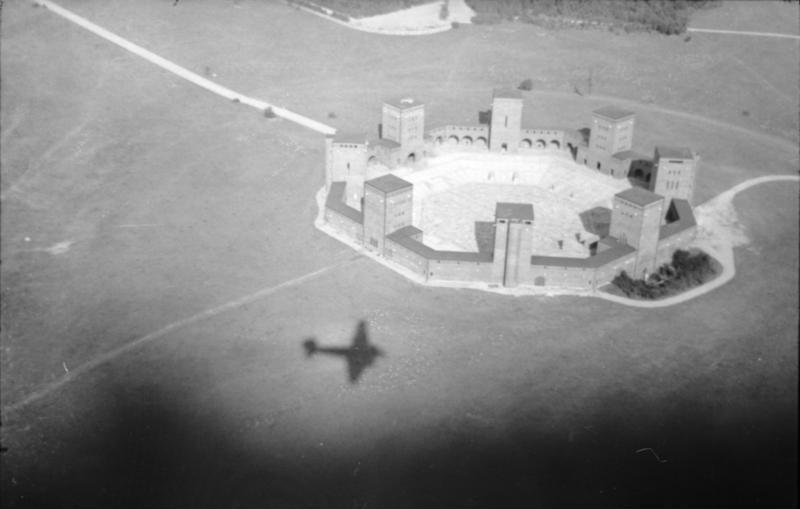
Aerial view 1944, from a Luftwaffe plane.

The memorial embraced the Anglo/French concept of the Unknown Soldier. In doing so, the architects anticipated the concept of Totenburgen (Fortresses of the Dead) housing mass graves of soldiers. This ideology was debated in Germany in the 1920s and 1930s. The architects imagined the memorial to be a new völkisch "community of the dead" and incorporated the burial of 20 unknown German soldiers from the Eastern Front into the project concept.

The memorial was built in a prominent place in a shape reminiscent of the castles of the Teutonic Knights. The monument's location on a hilltop was accentuated by massive earthworks and landscaping designed to look as if nature alone had shaped the site. The design influenced other projects undertaken by architects and builders during the era.

== Opening and dedication ==
A gathering of thousands came to the dedication of the newly finished memorial on 18 September 1927. The 80-year-old Hindenburg was dressed in the uniform of a Colonel-in-chief of a Masurian regiment to which he had been appointed by the Emperor (who had since abdicated). His speech was deemed highly nationalistic and in keeping with the times for the Weimar Republic, but was not well received outside Germany since it denied German responsibility for the war. An extract from the speech was later carved into a bronze plaque by the Nazi regime and installed in one of the towers of the memorial. A line of veterans, ten kilometers long and resplendent in Imperial uniforms, paid homage to Hindenburg and the 20 unknown German soldiers from the 1914 battle who were interred at the memorial.

== Inn ==
The architects had also built an inn nearby in traditional East Prussian style. The numbers of visitors did not meet expectations initially but during the Nazi era the numbers were such that the inn required an extension.

== Nazi era ==
In August 1933, the German government held a massive ceremony at the memorial to commemorate the anniversary of the battle; 1,500 cars transited through the Polish Corridor. Among those attending were Adolf Hitler, Hermann Göring, Franz von Papen and Erich Koch, East Prussia's gauleiter.

A year later, the monument again came to prominence on the death of Paul von Hindenburg. Hindenburg had requested a simple service and that he be interred next to his wife (who had died in 1921) in Hanover. However, Hitler decided to seize the opportunity for propaganda and instructed Albert Speer to ensure that the day was spectacular. It began with the transportation of the deceased president in the dark of night, on a gun carriage, from Hindenburg's East Prussian estate, Neudeck. Following a torch-lit route and escorted by infantry and cavalry, the cortège made its way to Hohenstein.

== Modernisation of the memorial ==
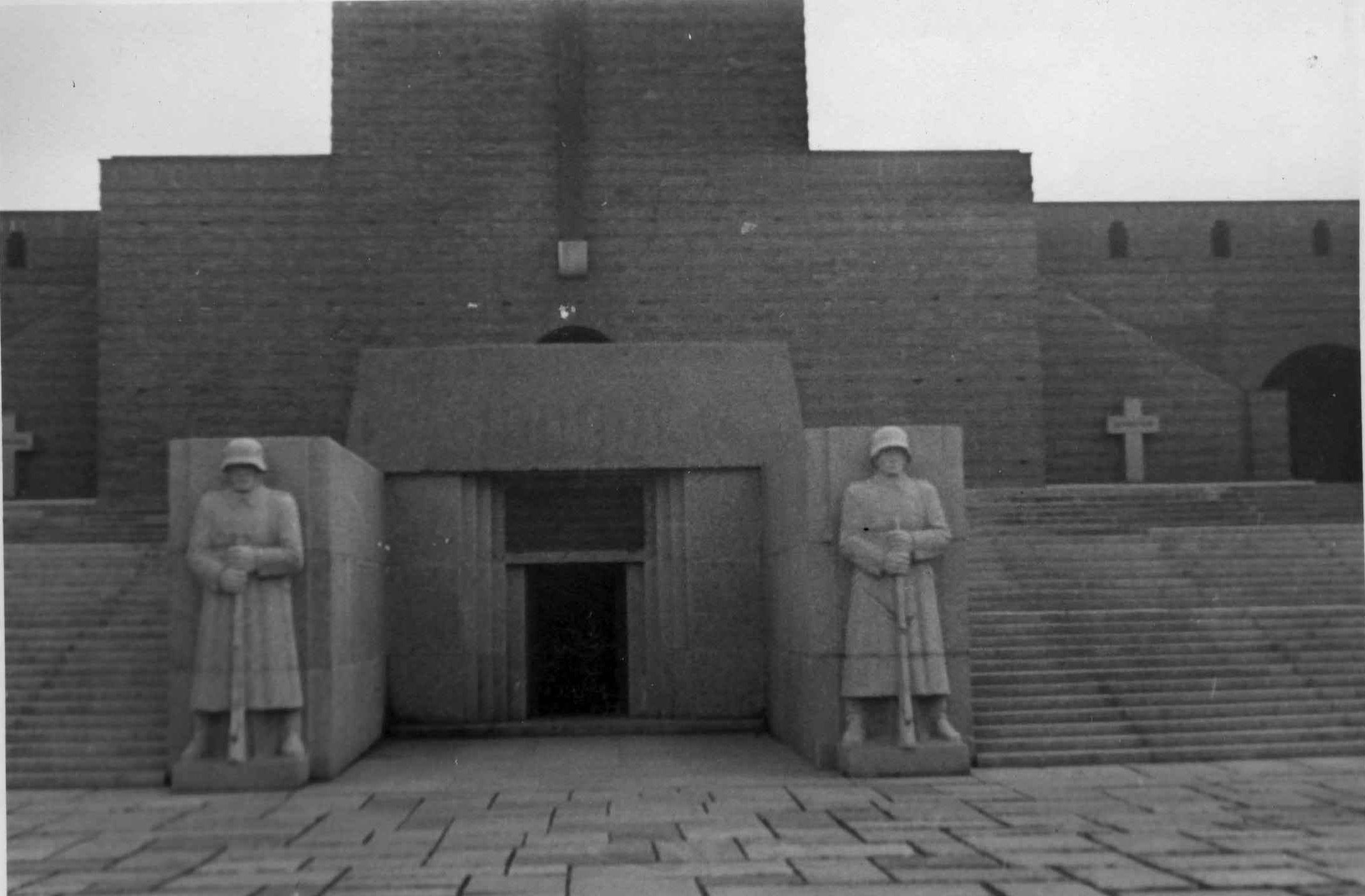
Image of the entrance to the new tomb

Following Hindenburg’s interment, the memorial once again became a national shrine. To add to the theatre, the government of the Reich again called upon the architectural firm of Krüger in Berlin and using the Stonehenge parallel again; above the entrance, a giant stone (symbolically from Königsberg) was placed, with the Field Marshal's name inscribed upon it. This stone was so large that railway bridges had to be strengthened to aid its transportation. Two giant stone soldiers (as if on guard) were placed outside the tomb. A porphyry statue of the victor, by the East Prussian Friedrich Bagdons, dominated the Hall of Honour above the tomb. The concourse grass was replaced with stone and around the memorial landscape were placed interpretations of the German presence in East Prussia.

== The new crypt ==
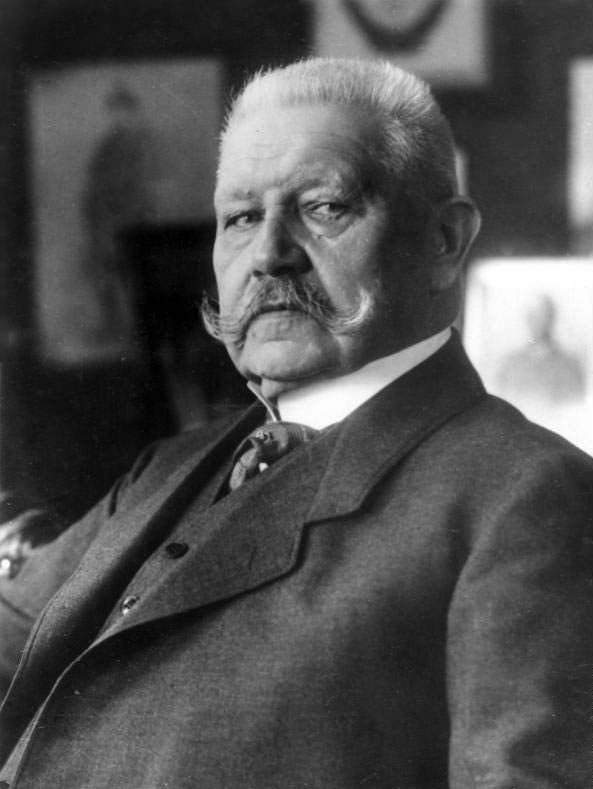
Generalfeldmarschall Paul von Hindenburg

Hindenburg was originally buried in the central yard or "plaza" of the monument on 7 August 1934. On 2 October 1935, the anniversary of Hindenburg's birthday, the President's bronze coffin was relocated to a new, sombre chamber where he was joined by his wife Gertrud, who was moved from the family plot in Hanover. The new crypt, which was completed in the autumn of 1935, was located directly below the south tower. To create an entrance to the crypt, Hindenburg and the 20 unknown German soldiers from the 1914 battle were temporarily disinterred, and the level of the plaza was lowered by 8 feet (2.4 m), with stone steps surrounding it on all sides. The unknown soldiers were re-interred in the side chapels. Designed by the Kruger brothers and carved by Paul Bronisch, the entrance to Hindenburg's crypt was dominated by two fourteen-foot sculptures of the Ewige Wache (Eternal Watch), which were carved out of more than 120 tons of Königsberg granite. The mausoleum had a dramatic vaulted ceiling.

== Pomp ==
The re-interment of the Generalfeldmarschall was marked by much pomp and ceremony by the Hitler administration, who declared that the upkeep of the memorial would thenceforth be carried out at government expense. The sarcophagus was draped in the German War Flag for the ceremony, at which Adolf Hitler performed the rededication. The Masuria region, where the memorial was built, was going through an economic resurgence at that time and nationalistic spirit was running high. This, and the ceremony of re-interment, caused one newspaper to claim "a glorious return of the Teutonic Order". From 1936–1939 a travelling exhibition about Masuria, but centred on the Tannenberg battle and memorial, toured Germany. The Baedecker guide of 1936 described the Tannenberg Memorial "Where President Hindenburg rests beside his fallen comrades" as "a place of national pilgrimage".

Plans were drawn up to install busts of the commanders and politicians involved in the Polish campaign with tablets inscribed with the Führer's speeches and a full-length statue of Adolf Hitler, but these never came about. At least one other commemoration was cancelled after the signing of the Anglo-Polish military alliance on 25 August 1939. The last state ceremonies held at the memorial were of two generals killed in the July Plot of 1944.

== Hindenburg's disinterment and partial demolition of the memorial ==
In January 1945, as Soviet forces advanced into East Prussia, Hitler ordered that the lead coffins of Hindenburg and his wife be disinterred and along with some of the regimental standards in the tomb, removed to safety. They were first moved to a bunker just outside Berlin, then to a salt mine near the village of Bernterode, Thuringia (in north central Germany), along with the remains of both Kaiser Wilhelm I and King Frederick II of Prussia (Frederick the Great). The four coffins were hastily marked to indicate their contents using red crayon, and interred behind a 6-foot-thick (1.8 m) masonry wall in a deep recess of the 14-mile (23 km) mine complex, 1,800 feet (550 m) underground. The coffins were discovered by U.S. Army Ordnance troops on 27 April 1945, and were moved to the basement of the heavily guarded Marburg Castle in Marburg an der Lahn, Germany. In August 1946, 20 months after being removed from the Tannenberg Memorial, Hindenburg and his wife were finally laid to rest by the American army at St. Elizabeth's, the church of his Teutonic ancestors in Marburg, where they remain today.

On 21 January 1945, withdrawing German forces planted demolition charges inside the entrance tower and the tower previously housing von Hindenburg's coffin, causing both towers to collapse. On 22 January Germans demolished more of the construction with a further 30 tons of explosives.

== Dismantling ==
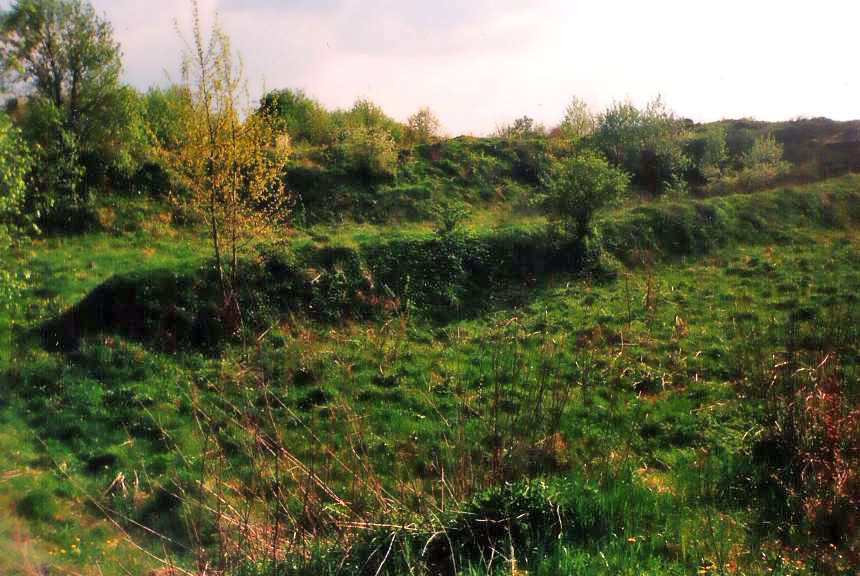
Remains of the Tannenberg Memorial, 1998

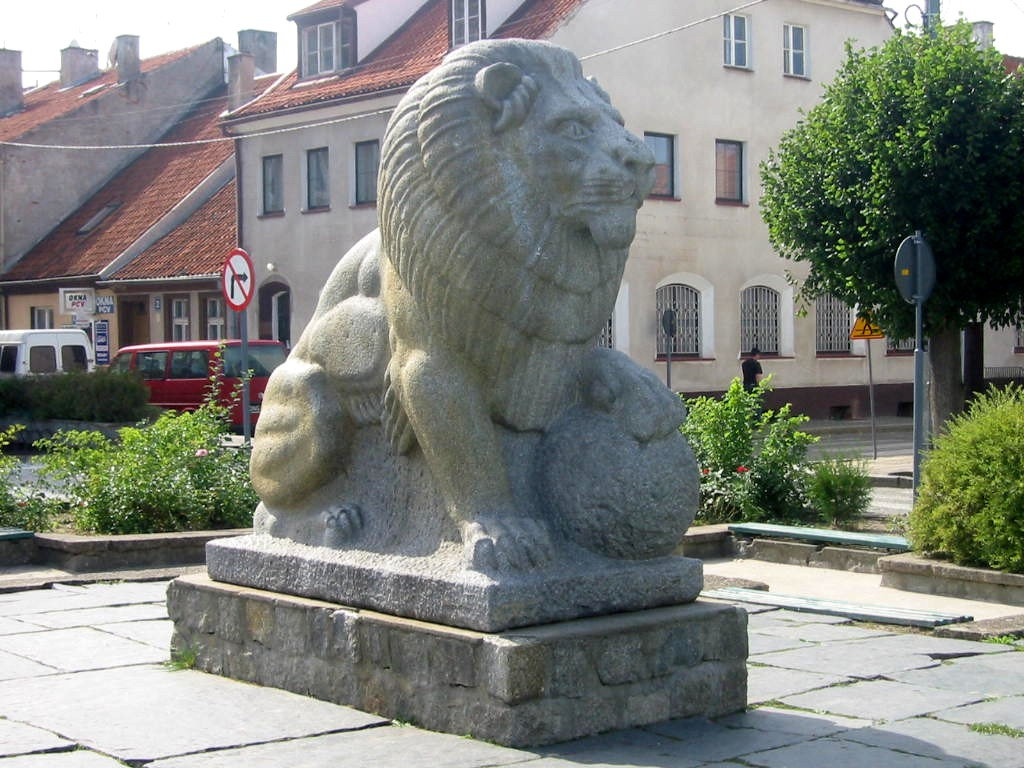
A sculpted lion, which once topped an 8-metre (26 ft) pyramid near the monument, is now displayed in Olsztynek

In the spring of 1949, the Communist Polish government ordered the dismantling of the very substantial remains of the monument, and the removal of the ruins continued until the 1980s, by which time virtually all traces had gone. Today, only a protruding island in an isolated field remains to mark the extensive 120-acre (49 ha) site. The Court of Honour, which measured slightly larger than a football field, has been reduced to little more than an overgrown pit of scattered debris and rubble.

Several significant remnants of the structure can still be seen elsewhere. A perfectly preserved sculpted lion, which once topped an eight-metre pyramid at another war memorial about 300m beside the monument, is now displayed in the town square in nearby Olsztynek.

After the Second World War, much of the material of the stone-and-granite memorial was used to build the Soviet war memorial in Olsztyn, the Monument to the Ghetto Heroes in Warsaw, and for the new Communist Party headquarters in Warsaw.

== Replica ==
Architect Dietrich Zlomke, born in Heiligenbeil near Königsberg, was commissioned to design a memorial to the dead of East and West Prussia in the two world wars, which was dedicated at Oberschleißheim near Munich in 1995. His choice of design was a smaller-scale replica of the Tannenberg Memorial in concrete, dominated in the centre by an oak cross six metres high and a smaller iron cross on the pale wall at the rear.
