= Krzysztof Celestyn Mrongovius =

Polish linguist

- Krzysztof Celestyn Mrongowiusz
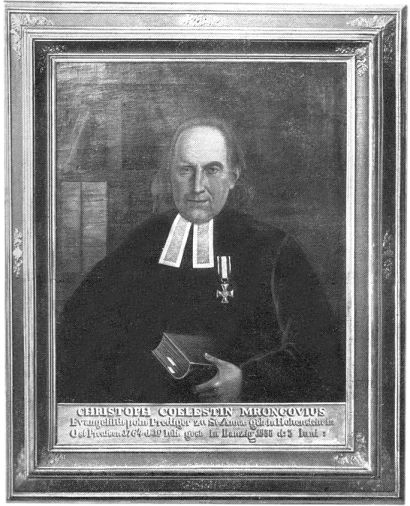
- Born: July 19, 1764; Hohenstein in Ostpreußen, East Prussia, Kingdom of Prussia
- Died: June 3, 1855 (aged 90); Danzig, Province of Prussia, Kingdom of Prussia
- Years active: Königsberg Enlightenment
- Board member of: TPN
- Spouse: Wilhelmina Luise Paarmann
- Parent: Bartholomeus
- Awards: Order of the Red Eagle

Academic background
- Education: University of Königsberg

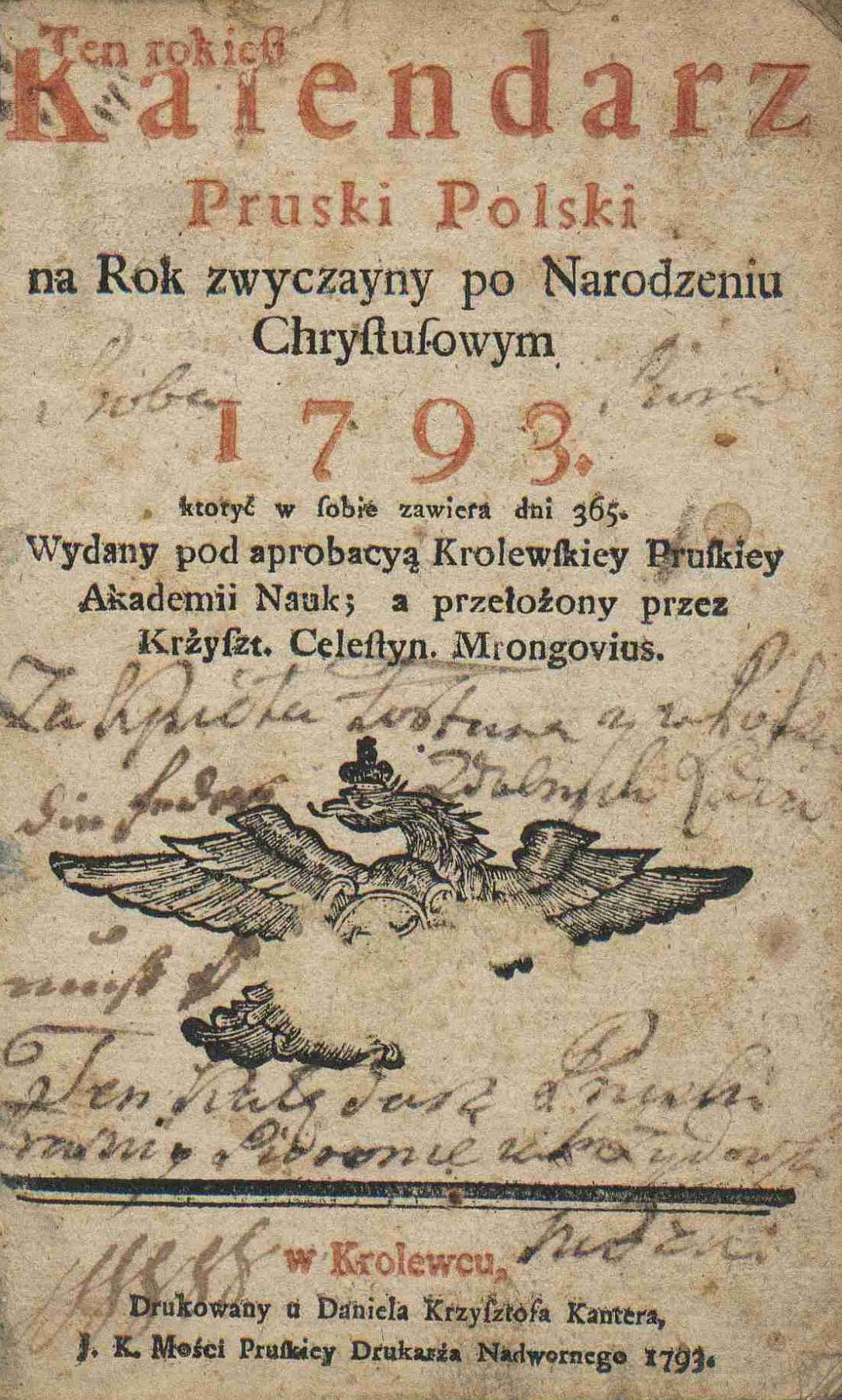
the Kalendarz Pruski - Polski (transl. Prussian-Polish calendar), published in Königsberg 1793.

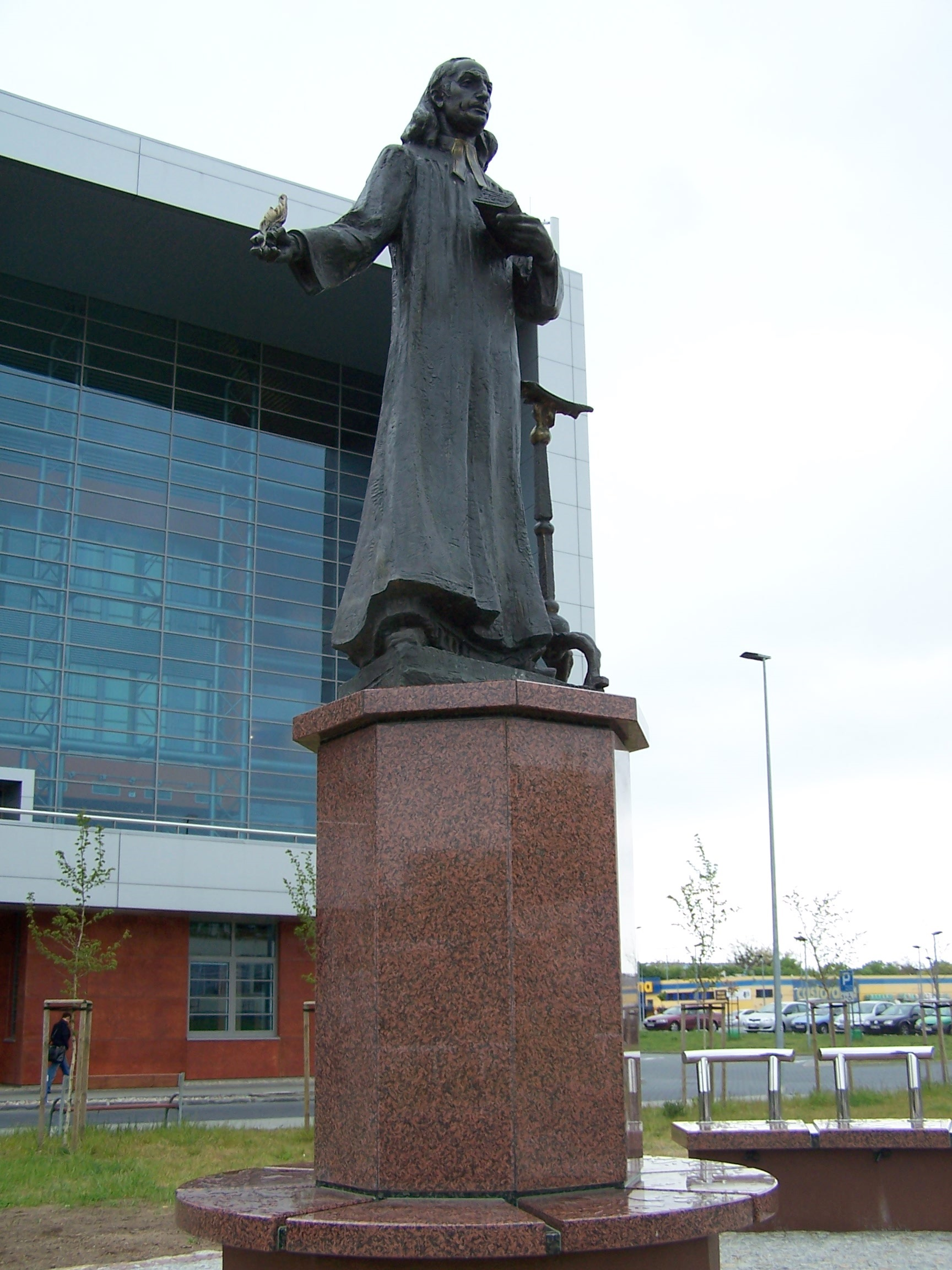
Monument to Mrongovius in Gdańsk by the sculptor Giennadij Jerszow

Krzysztof Celestyn Mrongovius (German: Christoph Cölestin Mrongovius; Polish: Krzysztof Celestyn Mrongowiusz; Kashubian: Krësztof Celestin Mrągòwiusz) (July 19, 1764 – June 3, 1855) was a Protestant pastor, writer, philosopher, distinguished linguist, and translator. Mrongovius was a noted defender of the Polish language in Warmia and Masuria.

== Biography ==
Mrongovius, son of Bartholomeus, was born in Hohenstein, Kingdom of Prussia (now Olsztynek in Poland). Mrongovius attended a school in Saalfeld (present-day Zalewo), and then studied at the cathedral school in Königsberg. He matriculated on 21 March 1782 at Königsberg University. During his second semester, he attended Immanuel Kant's metaphysics lectures, followed by theology, logic, anthropology and moral philosophy, and physics.

From 1790 to 1796 Mrongovius taught Polish and Greek at the Collegium Fridericianum. In 1796 he married Wilhelmina Luise Paarmann. Until 1798 he was also a copyeditor of Polish languages in several publishing houses in Prussia. In 1798 he received the pastorate at St. Anne's Church, Gdańsk, where he also taught Polish from 1812 to 1817. Besides Polish, Greek and Kashubian, he taught in Czech and Russian as well. He died aged at 91 on June 3, 1855, in Danzig (now Gdańsk).

In honor of Mrongovius, the name of the former East Prussian city Sensburg (Polish: Żądzbork) was changed to Mrągowo in 1947 by the new Polish administration.

== Works ==
Mrongovius was known for preserving and teaching Polish cultural heritage and language in Danzig to people from the territories affected by the Partitions of the Polish–Lithuanian Commonwealth. He also pioneered the research of Kashubian culture and collected many Slavic artifacts from Masuria. He translated into Polish such works as Anabasis. Mrongovius was a member-correspondent of the Society of Friends of Science in Warsaw (from 1823) (approved by acclamation), Gesellschaft für Pommersche Geschichte und Altertumskunde in Stettin (from 1827) and member-correspondent of the Kraków Scientific Society (Towarzystwo Naukowe Krakowskie) (from 1833). He was honoured with a medal and membership of Historical-Literary Society in Paris (1852), as well as the Prussian Order of the Red Eagle, 4th class (1843). He was supported by Prince Adam Kazimierz Czartoryski, and he corresponded with scholars such as Stanisław Staszic, Tadeusz Czacki, Alojzy Feliński, Andrzej Horodyski, Stanisław Kostka Potocki, and Samuel Bogumił Linde.

Mrongovius is also important as the primary source of seven sets of notes on Immanuel Kant's lectures in anthropology, metaphysics, theology, physics, logic, and two on moral philosophy. Mrongovius was the author of a number of books and one of the first Polish-German dictionaries. His extensive book collection, numbering over 1000 titles and including many rare manuscripts, is now kept in the Polish Academy of Sciences' library in Gdańsk.

=== Detailed Polish–German dictionaries ===
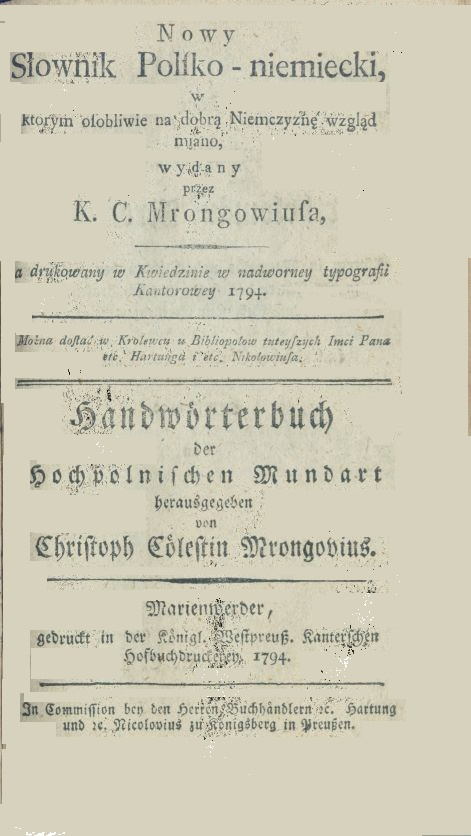
Title page of Mrongovius's Polish-German dictionary

- 1794 Marienwerder Königl. Westpreuß. Kanterschen Hofbuchdruckerey. Christoph Coelestin Mrongovius Handwörterbuch der Hochpolnischen Mundart — Nowy Slownik Polsko-niemiecki.
- 1835 Königsberg in Preussen: Gebrüder Bornträger, Ausführliches polnisch-deutsches Wörterbuch — kritisch bearbeitet von Christoph Cölestin Mrongovius

== Bibliography ==
- Bieńkowski, Wiesław (1983). Krzysztof Celestyn Mrongowiusz 1764–1855. W służbie umiłowanego języka (in Polish). Olsztyn.
- Bieńkowski, Wiesław, "Mrongowiusz (Mrongovius) Krzysztof Celestyn (1764–1855)", Polski Słownik Biograficzny, vol XXII, pp. 190–195.
- Breza, Edward, "Leksykografia kaszubska" in "Komunikaty Instytutu Bałtyckiego", nº 21, pp. 63–68. (in Polish)
- Cieślak, Tadeusz (1967). "Krzysztof Celestyn Mrongowiusz". Sylwetki mazurskie i kaszubskie (in Polish). Warszawa. pp. 9–40.
- Czerniakowska, Ewa, "Słowniki K. C. Mrongowiusza" (Dictionaries of K.C. Mrongovius), "Pomerania" 1985 nº9.
- Żelazny, Mirosław and Werner Stark, "Zu Krzysztof Celestyn Mrongovius und seinen Kollegheften nach Kants Vorlesungen.", 1987. (in German)
