= Sue Lloyd =

English model and actress (1939–2011)

- Born: Susan Margery Jeaffreson Lloyd; 7 August 1939; Aldeburgh, Suffolk, England
- Died: 20 October 2011 (aged 72); London, England
- Resting place: Reading Cemetery and Crematorium
- Occupations: Model; actress
- Years active: 1963–2001
- Spouse: Ronald Allen (m. 1991; died 1991)

Susan Margery Jeaffreson Lloyd (7 August 1939 – 20 October 2011) was an English model and actress, with numerous film and television credits. She may be best known for her long-running role (1979 to 1985) as Barbara Hunter (née Brady) in the British soap opera Crossroads and Cordelia Winfield in the ITC series The Baron.

== Early life ==
The daughter of a GP, Lloyd was born in Aldeburgh, Suffolk. She attended Edgbaston High School in Birmingham and studied dance as a child, attending Sadler's Wells Ballet School. In 1953, she won a scholarship to the Royal Ballet School at Sadler's Wells Theatre, but when she grew to 5 feet 8 inches [1.73 m] the possibility of a career as a dancer diminished, and she became a showgirl and model, and briefly, a member of Lionel Blair's dance troupe.

She was one of the last two debutantes to be presented to the queen at Buckingham Palace in 1958, the final such ceremony.

== Films and television ==
In 1965, Lloyd made her film debut in two espionage-themed films. As Jean Courtney, Lloyd proved an effective foil to Michael Caine's Harry Palmer in the spy thriller The Ipcress File. Also in 1965, Lloyd played the regular role of secret agent Cordelia Winfield, alongside Steve Forrest in the 1965–1966 British ITC television series The Baron.

Having appeared in the TV series The Avengers (episode "A Surfeit of H_{2}O"), in 1971 Lloyd starred with Simon Oates in a stage version of the TV series playing John Steed's sidekick Mrs Hannah Wild. In The New Avengers she supplied the voice of Emma Peel in an episode where Steed chats to her on the telephone. She appeared with several other stars in the 1976 imitation James Bond film No. 1 of the Secret Service.

She made many guest appearances in several popular shows of the 1960s and 1970s, including The Saint, Department S, Jason King, Randall and Hopkirk (Deceased), The Persuaders! and The Sweeney.

Joan Collins and Lloyd co-starred in The Stud (1978) and The Bitch (1979). On her Twitter page, Joan Collins said that she and Lloyd had to get drunk before their nude scenes. Her other film credits include Corruption (1968) and Revenge of the Pink Panther (1978). She reunited with Michael Caine in Bullet to Beijing (1995), one of the later Harry Palmer films, recreating her role from The Ipcress File. Her scene was cut from the home VHS and DVD releases, but was later made available as DVD Extras.

Lloyd joined the long-running British soap opera Crossroads in 1979. She played Barbara Hunter until she and her on- and off-screen partner Ronald Allen were dropped from the series in 1985.

== Personal life ==
In Crossroads Lloyd played Barbara, the wife of David Hunter played by actor Ronald Allen, who was sacked on the same day she was. They were good friends, became a couple and made their relationship public when the British media started to intrude into their private lives. In March 1991, after Allen learned that he was dying of cancer, he and Lloyd became engaged and were married in May 1991. Allen died the following month, on 18 June 1991.

Lloyd died on 20 October 2011 from cancer at the age of 72.

== In popular culture ==
In the 2023 ITVX miniseries Nolly, which dramatised the life of her former Crossroads colleague Noele Gordon, Lloyd was portrayed by Clare Foster.

== Filmography ==
Movies

- Nothing but the Best (1964) – Debutante at Hunt Ball (uncredited)
- The Ipcress File (1965) – Jean Courtney
- Hysteria (1965) – French Girl
- Attack on the Iron Coast (1968) – Sue Wilson
- Corruption (1968) – Lynn Nolan
- Where's Jack? (1969) – Lady Darlington
- Twinky (1970) – Ursula – Scott's Deprived Girl
- Percy (1971) – Bernice
- Innocent Bystanders (1972) – Joanna Benson
- Go for a Take (1972) – Angel Montgomery
- Penny Gold (1973) – Model
- That's Your Funeral (1973) - Miss Peach
- Spanish Fly (1975) – Janet Scott
- The Ups and Downs of a Handyman (1976) – The Blonde
- No. 1 of the Secret Service (1977) – Sister Jane
- Revenge of the Pink Panther (1977) – Claude Rousseau
- The Stud (1978) – Vanessa
- Lady Oscar (1979) – Comtesse Gabrielle de Polignac
- The Bitch (1979) – Vanessa Grant
- Correction, Please or How We Got into Pictures (1979) – Countess Skladanowsky
- Rough Cut (1980) – Female Guest
- Eat the Rich (1987) – Val
- U.F.O. (1993) – Judge
- Bullet to Beijing (1995) – Jean Courtney
- Beginner's Luck (2001) – (Last appearance)

Television

- Armchair Theatre: "The Last Word on Julie" (1964) – Julie Lister
- The Saint: "Luella"(1964)/"Island of Chance" (1967) – Marla Clayton / Luella
- Gideon's Way (1965) credited as Susan Lloyd– Mary Henderson / Det. Chief Insp. David Keene's love interest
- The Avengers: "A Surfeit of H_{2}O" (1965) – Joyce Jason
- The Baron (1966–1967) – Cordelia Winfield
- Journey to the Unknown: "The Madison Equation" (1969) – Barbara Rossiter
- Hadleigh: "Ep3: An Excellent Thing For The District" (1969) - Lady Alexandra Stafax
- Department S: "Black Out" (1969) – Brigitte
- His and Hers (1970) – Kay Sherwin
- The Persuaders!: "Take Seven" (1971) – Maggie
- Jason King: "An Author in Search of Two Characters" (1972) – Eve
- The Two Ronnies (1972) – Blanche
- That's Your Funeral: "Divorce" (1972) – Miss Peach
- The Sweeney: "Sweet Smell of Succession" (1976) – Arleen Baker
- Whodunnit?: "A Deadly Tan" (1976)/"A Bad Sign" (1978) – Mrs. Revi Laser/Joanna Tibbet
- The New Avengers (1977) – Episode: "K Is for Kill Part One: The Tiger Awakes": Emma Peel (voice only)
- The Upchat Line: "The One That Got Away" (1977) – Mona Lisa
- Sherlock Holmes and Doctor Watson – Episode: Murder on a Midsummer's Eve (1979) – Elizabeth Neale
- Crossroads (1979–1985) – Barbara Hunter / Barbara Brady
- Sherlock Holmes and Doctor Watson: The Case of Magruder's Millions (1980) – Miss Collins
- Super Gran: "Super Gran and the Yankee Doodle's Boogle" (1987) – Hilda
- Bergerac (1988–1990) – Eva Southurst
- Agatha Christie's Miss Marple: A Caribbean Mystery (1989) – Lucky Dyson
- The Comic Strip Presents: "Red Nose of Courage" (1992) – Mum
- Keeping Up Appearances: "Let There Be Light" (1993) – Mrs. Drummond
