= Olsztynek =

Town in Poland

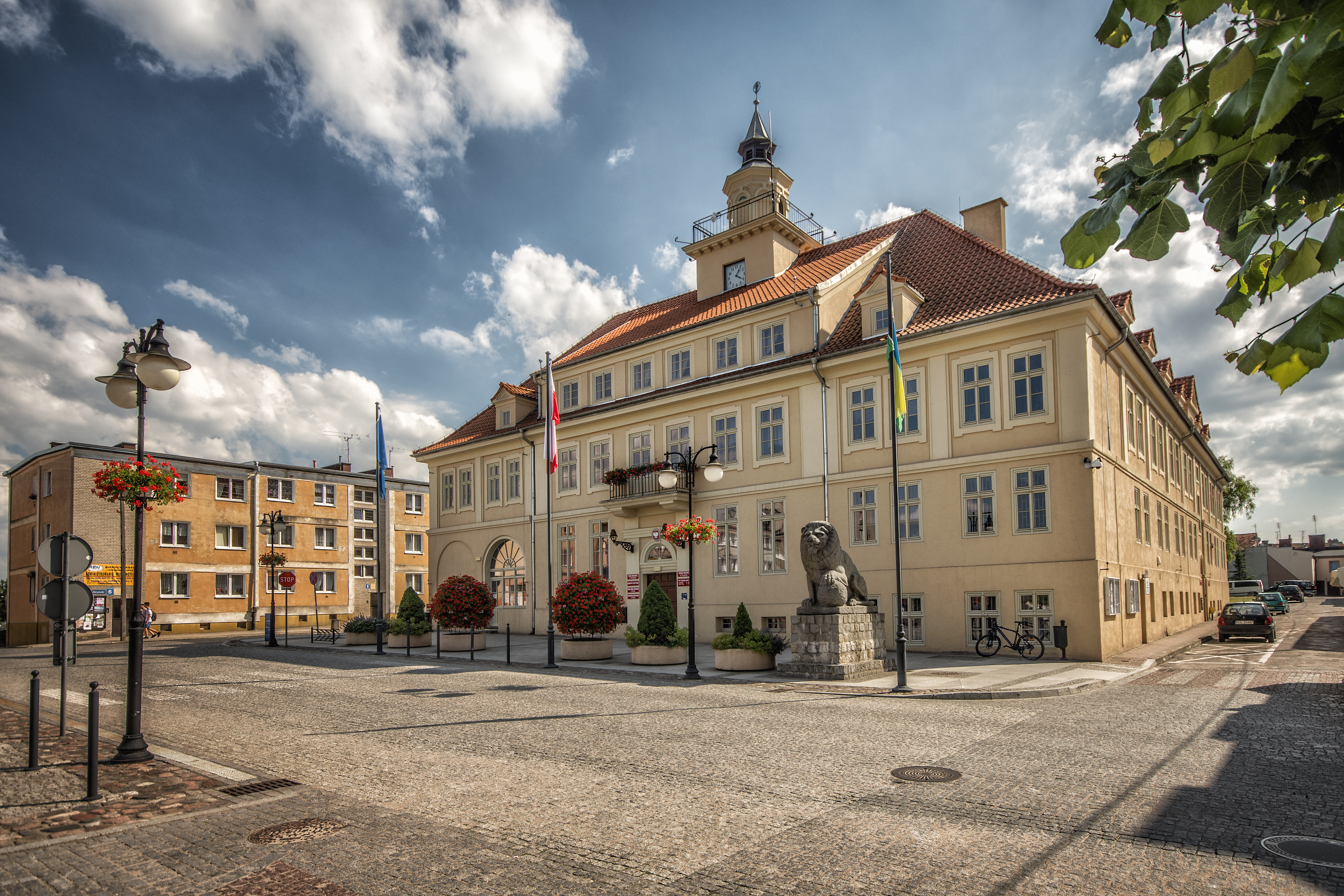
- Market Square and town hall

- Flag Coat of arms

- Location within Poland
- Coordinates: 53°35′N 20°17′E
- Country: Poland
- Voivodeship: Warmian-Masurian
- County: Olsztyn
- Gmina: Olsztynek
- Town rights: 1359

Area
  - Total: 7.69 km^{2} (2.97 sq mi)

Population (2017)
  - Total: 7,677
  - Density: 998/km^{2} (2,590/sq mi)
- Time zone: UTC+1 (CET)
  - Summer (DST): UTC+2 (CEST)
- Postal code: 11-015
- Vehicle registration: NOL
- Website: http://www.olsztynek.pl

Olsztynek [ɔlʂˈtɨnɛk] (German: Hohenstein) is a town in northern Poland, in Olsztyn County, in the Warmian-Masurian Voivodeship. It is the administrative seat of Gmina Olsztynek. It is part of the ethnocultural region of Masuria.

Olsztynek is a member of Cittaslow.

== Geography ==
Olsztynek is located about 28 km (17 mi) south of Olsztyn in the western part of the Masurian Lake District, where it borders on the Prussian Uplands (Prusy Górne), part of the Baltic Uplands.

== Transport ==
Olsztynek station is a stop on the railway line from Olsztyn to Działdowo. The expressway S7 running from Gdańsk via Olsztynek to Warsaw and Kraków, parts of which are still under construction, is part of the European route E77. A direct link to Olsztyn is provided by the expressway S51. The intersection of the S7 and S51 highways is located just outside the town limits of Olsztynek, and the National road 58 also runs through the town.

== History ==
=== Early history ===
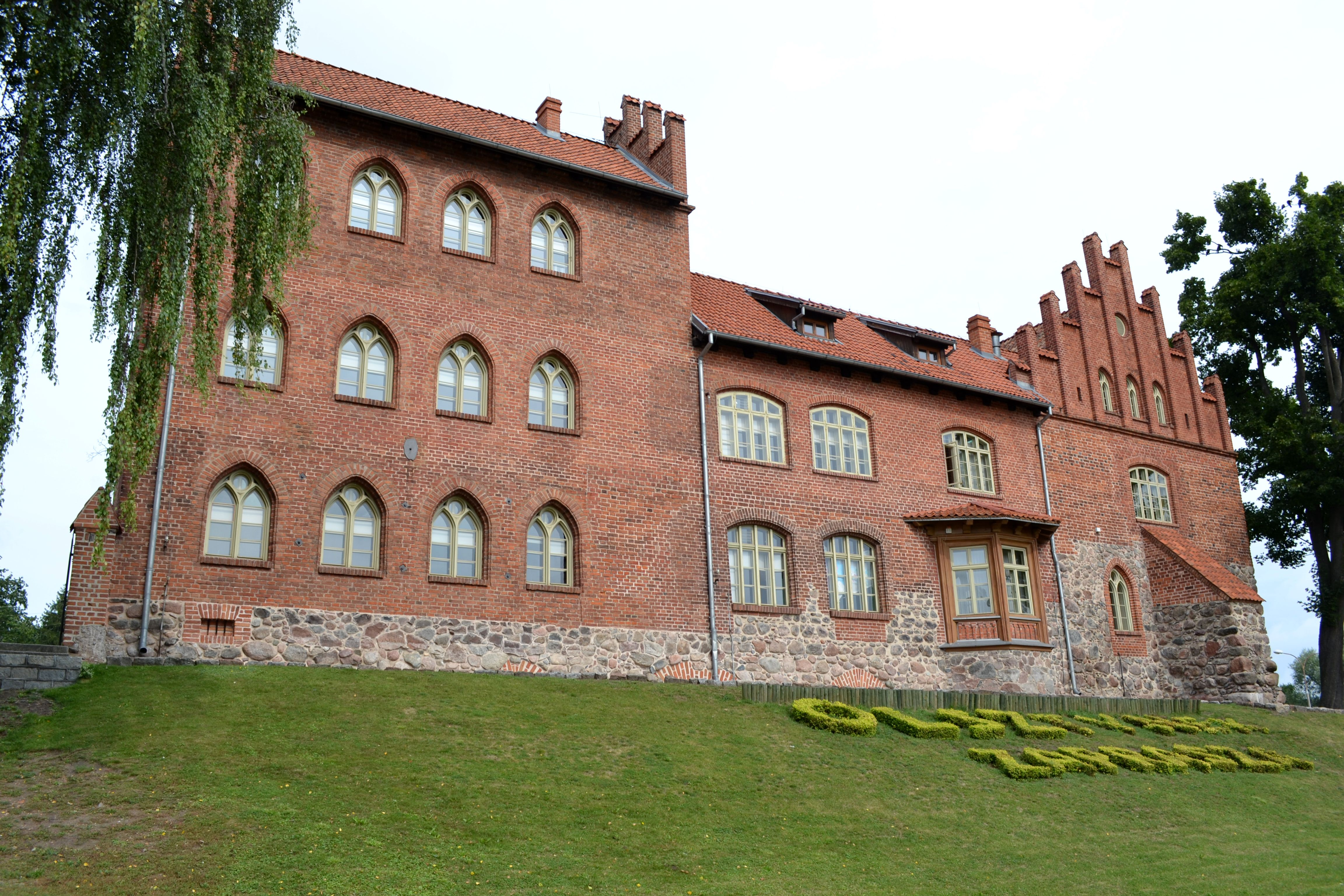
Olsztynek Castle

Several decades after the subjugation of the Old Prussians, Hohenstein Castle was erected from 1351 to colonize the Sasna lands at the behest of Günter von Hohenstein, commander of the Teutonic Knights at the Osterode commandry. A parish church was mentioned in 1348. Grand Master Winrich von Kniprode granted the surrounding settlement town privileges according to Kulm law in 1359. Hohenstein became the seat of the local administration within the State of the Teutonic Order.

During the Polish–Lithuanian–Teutonic War, the 1410 Battle of Grunwald took place in the vicinity of the town, whereby the Poles and Lithuanians defeated the Teutonic Knights.

In the succeeding fights, Hohenstein was seized and burnt down to the ground, in order not to let it pass into Polish hands. Quickly rebuilt afterwards, the citizens however had to face high taxes imposed by the Order who had to refinance their vast indemnities made against them in the 1411 Peace of Thorn. As a result of these taxes, the town became a member of the Prussian Confederation in 1444, opposing the Order's State. At the request of the organization, in 1454, King Casimir IV Jagiellon signed the act of incorporation of the region to the Kingdom of Poland, and the town became part of Poland. However it returned to the Order's rule during the Thirteen Years' War in 1455. After the Second Peace of Thorn in 1466, it remained part of the Order's State which in turn became a feudal fief of the King of Poland. Following the conversion of Grand Master Albert von Hohenzollern to Lutheranism in 1525, the town became part of the Protestant Duchy of Prussia, a vassal duchy of Poland. During the Polish–Teutonic War of 1519–1521, the town was captured by Polish troops under Hetman Mikołaj Firlej, who confirmed the town privileges.

=== 17th–19th century ===
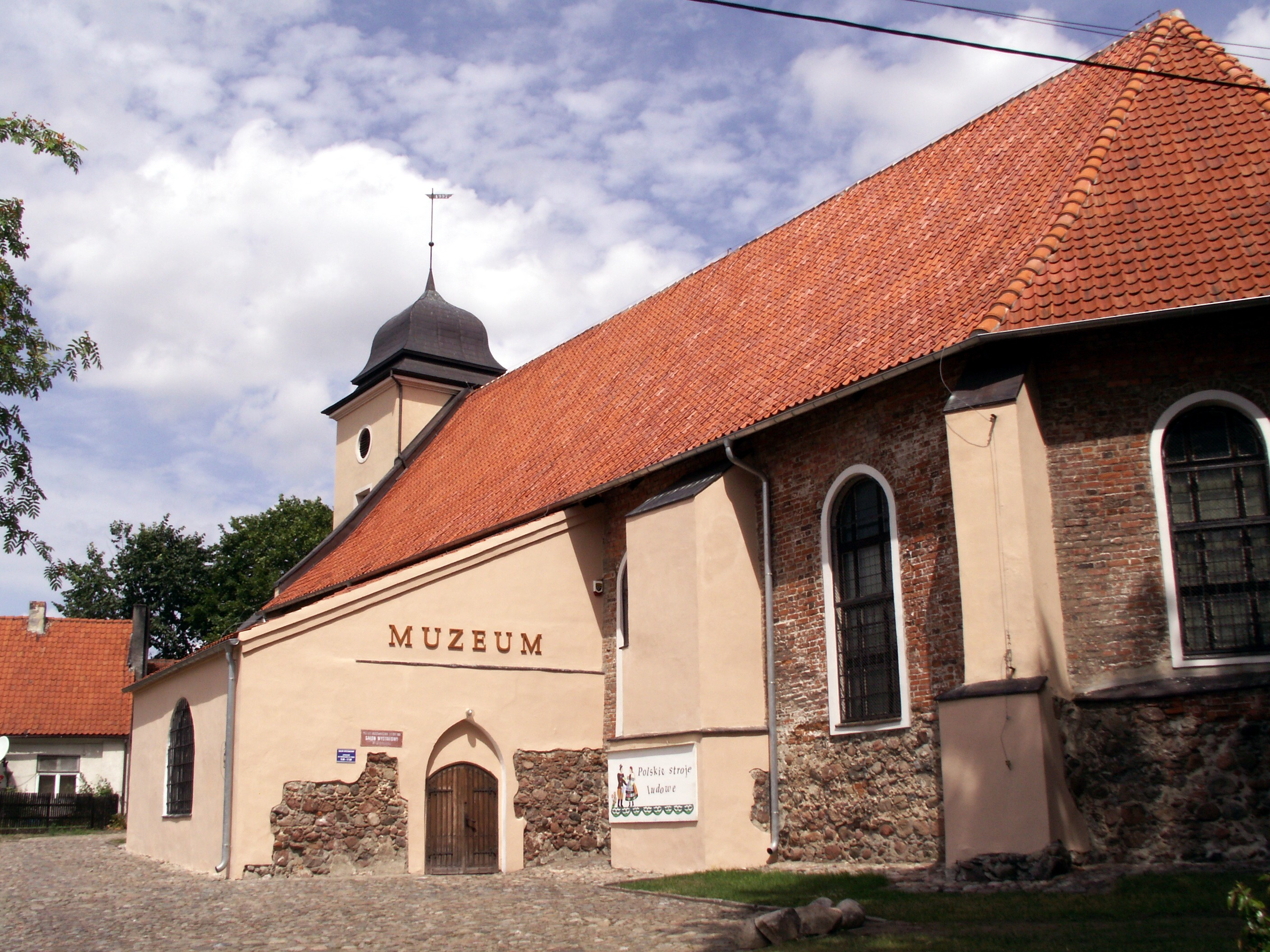
Former Protestant church

From 1618, the Duchy was in personal union with the Imperial Margraviate of Brandenburg as Brandenburg-Prussia, although remained under Polish suzerainty until 1657. During the Polish–Swedish War of 1626–1629, Polish troops were stationed around the town in 1626. During the Second Northern War it was plundered by Swedish troops in 1656. Hohenstein with Ducal Prussia was incorporated into the Kingdom of Prussia in 1701. In 1804, a fire destroyed 108 houses and the townhall. During the Napoleonic Wars in 1807 the French stayed in Hohenstein, including French marshals Michel Ney and Pierre Augereau.

After the 1871 unification of Germany, Prussia became part of the German Empire. Administratively, the town was part of Landkreis (district) Osterode (Ostróda) in the province of East Prussia. Although Hohenstein was outside Poland after 1657, in the late 19th century Poles still formed the majority of the local Lutheran parish (majority of the town's population was Lutheran), with 3,344 people in comparison to 1,966 Germans. In 1898, a local branch of the anti-Polish German Eastern Marches Society was founded, the organization's busiest branch in Masuria.

=== 20th century ===
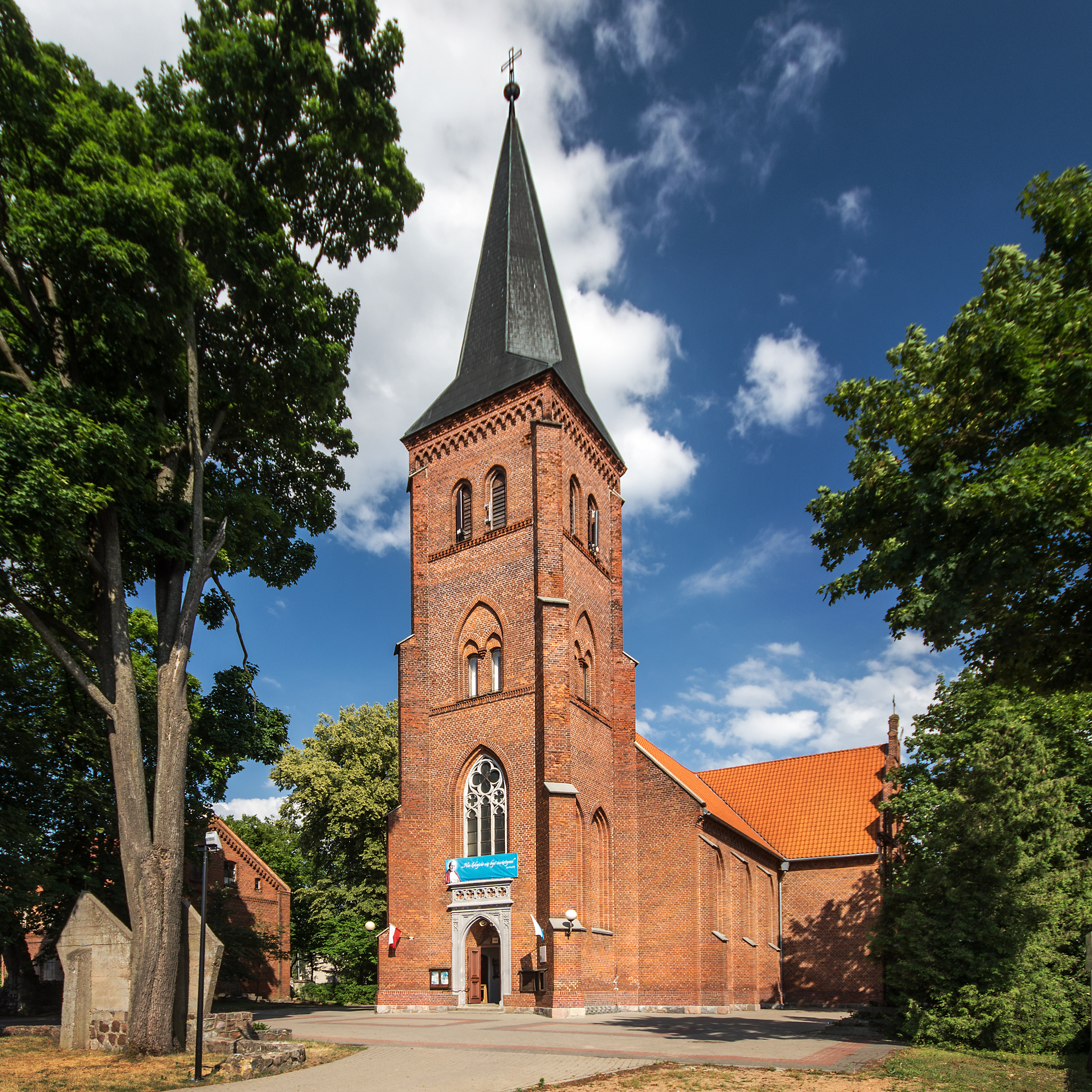
Gothic Revival Sacred Heart church

From 1903 to 1933, the Tuberculosis sanatorium Hohenstein for male patients operated in the municipal forest about 4 km (2 mi) north of the town center.

At the beginning of World War I in August 1914, Imperial Russian Army troops invaded the province but were defeated by German Army forces under General Paul von Hindenburg and Quartermaster-General Erich Ludendorff in the Battle of Tannenberg, which was fought from 27 to 29 August in and around Hohenstein, during which 115 buildings including the town hall were destroyed. However, Hindenburg wanted to name it after Tannenberg to counter the myth of the German defeat in the 1410 Battle of Grunwald, which was known as the (First) Battle of Tannenberg in German sources.

The town's reconstruction started during World War I with financial aid from Leipzig and was largely completed by 1920. The town hall was completed in 1922/23. As a condition of the Treaty of Versailles, the Allies held the East Prussian plebiscite on 11 July 1920 to determine if the people in the southern districts of the East Prussia wanted to remain within the Free State of Prussia and Germany or to join the resurrected Second Polish Republic, which had just regained independence after World War I. The plebiscite resulted in 1,780 votes for Germany and 20 for Poland. It was a shock for Poland to realise that people of Polish ethnicity had preferred to remain within the German State.

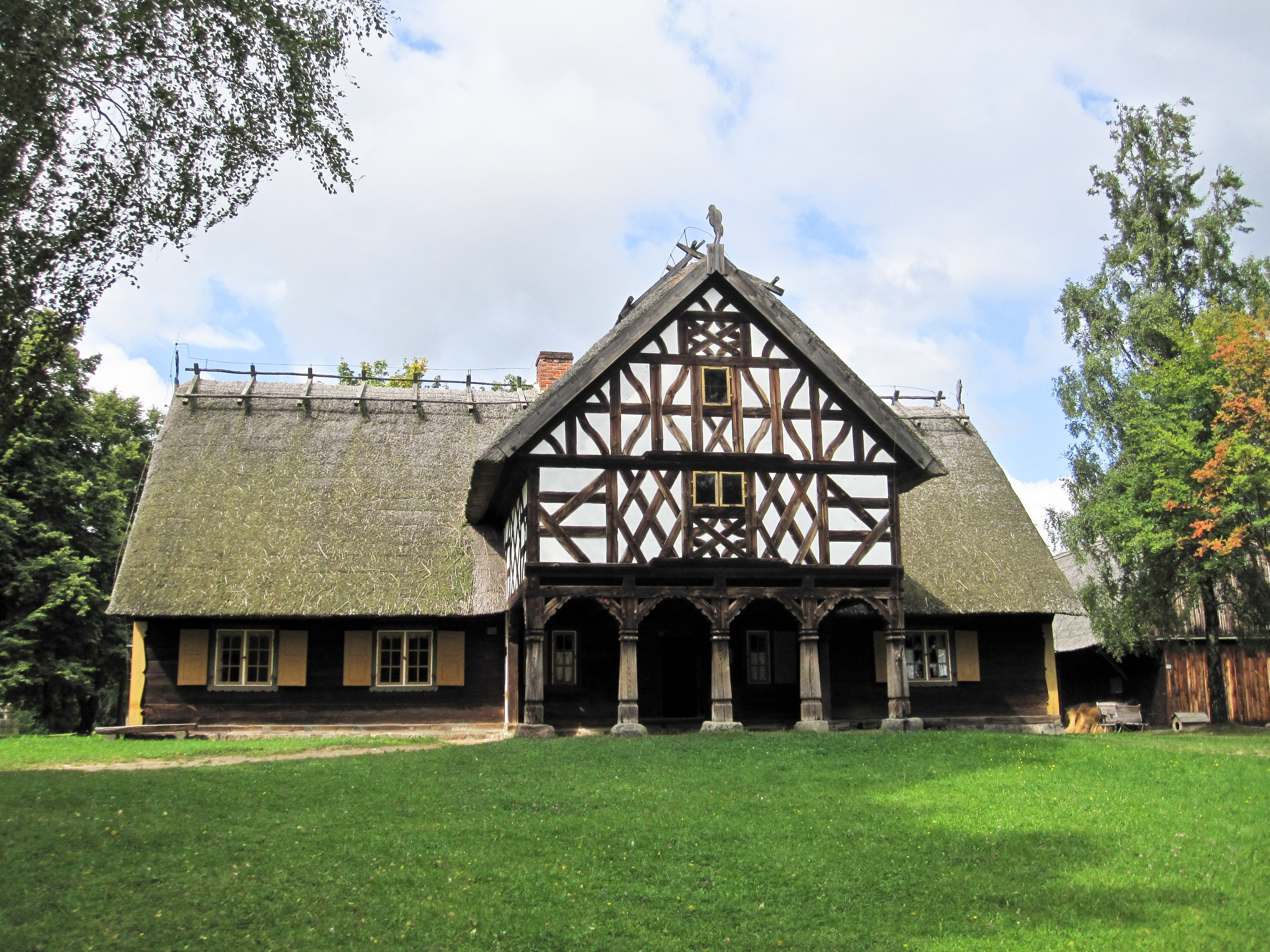
Museum of Folk Architecture

In remembrance of the 1914 battle a large Tannenberg Memorial was inaugurated here on 18 September 1927 and made the place of the burial of Reich President Paul von Hindenburg on 7 August 1934. In World War II, parts of it were used for the Stalag I-B prisoner-of-war camp. With the Red Army's advance in 1945, Hindenburg's coffin (and his wife's) was removed and taken West. The memorial was completely demolished by the communist Polish government in 1949. A surviving lion is displayed in front of the Olsztynek town hall.

In January 1945, the town was occupied by the Red Army in the East Prussian Offensive. Later it was handed over to the Republic of Poland; the German population was expelled in accordance with the Potsdam Agreement and the region was resettled with Poles, especially those expelled from territories of Poland annexed by the Soviet Union.

In 1960, a memorial for the 1410 Battle of Grunwald was erected by Polish authorities.

== Sports ==
The local football club is Olimpia Olsztynek. It competes in the lower leagues.

== Notable people ==
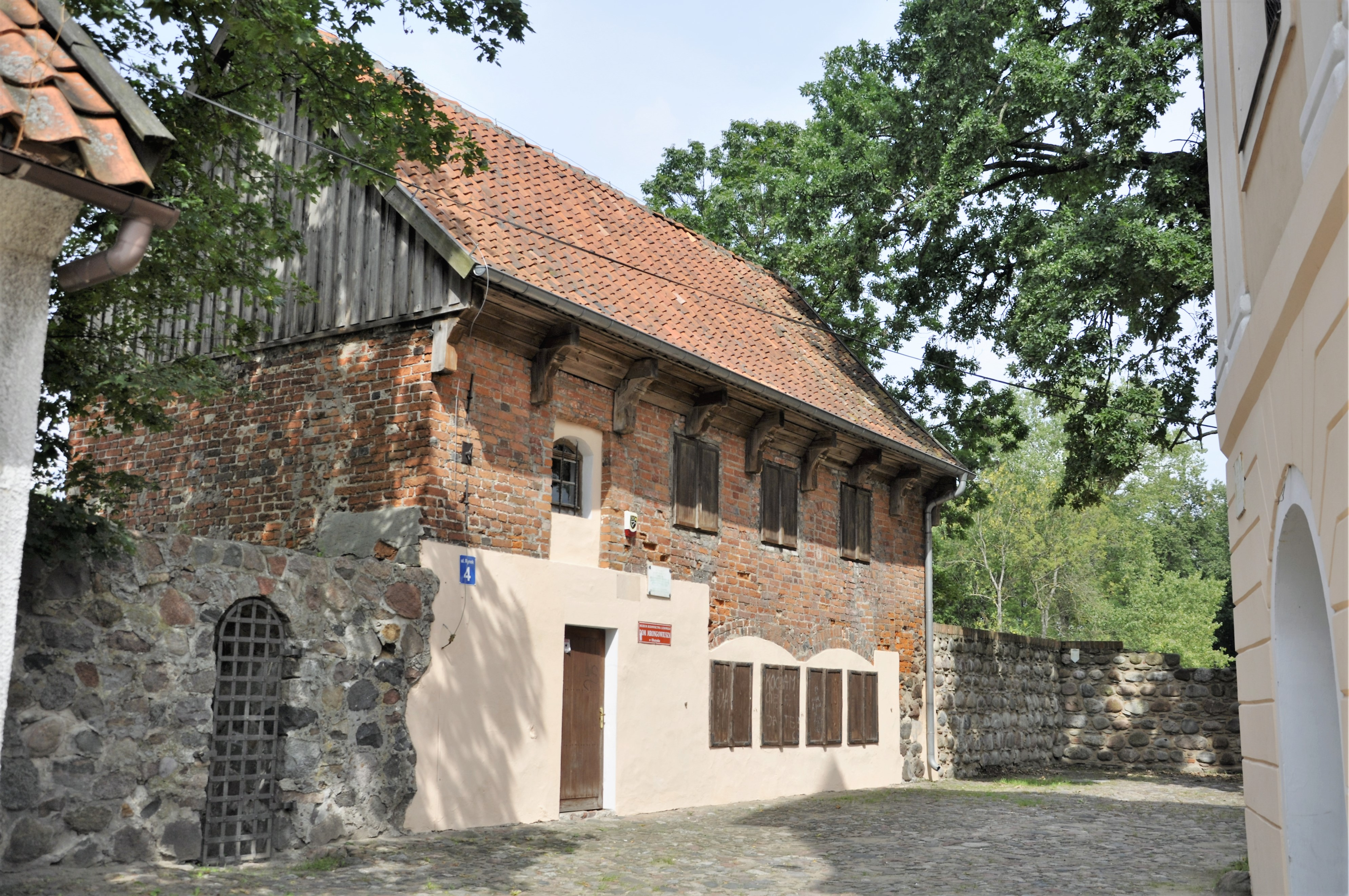
Birthplace of Krzysztof Celestyn Mrongovius in Olsztynek, nowadays a museum

- Krzysztof Celestyn Mrongovius (1764–1855), Polish pastor, linguist, writer and translator, opponent of Germanisation
- Hieronim Derdowski (1852–1902), Kashubian-Polish intellectual, poet and activist
- Paul Wendland (1864–1915), German classical philologist
- Paul Kahle (1875–1964), German orientalist
- Albert Lieven (1906–1971), German actor
- Klaus Porbadnik (born 1930), German athlete
