= Tuberculosis sanatorium Hohenstein =

Tuberculosis sanatorium Hohenstein Lungenheilstätte Hohenstein
- Verein zur Errichtung von Lungenheilstätten in Ostpreußen e.V.
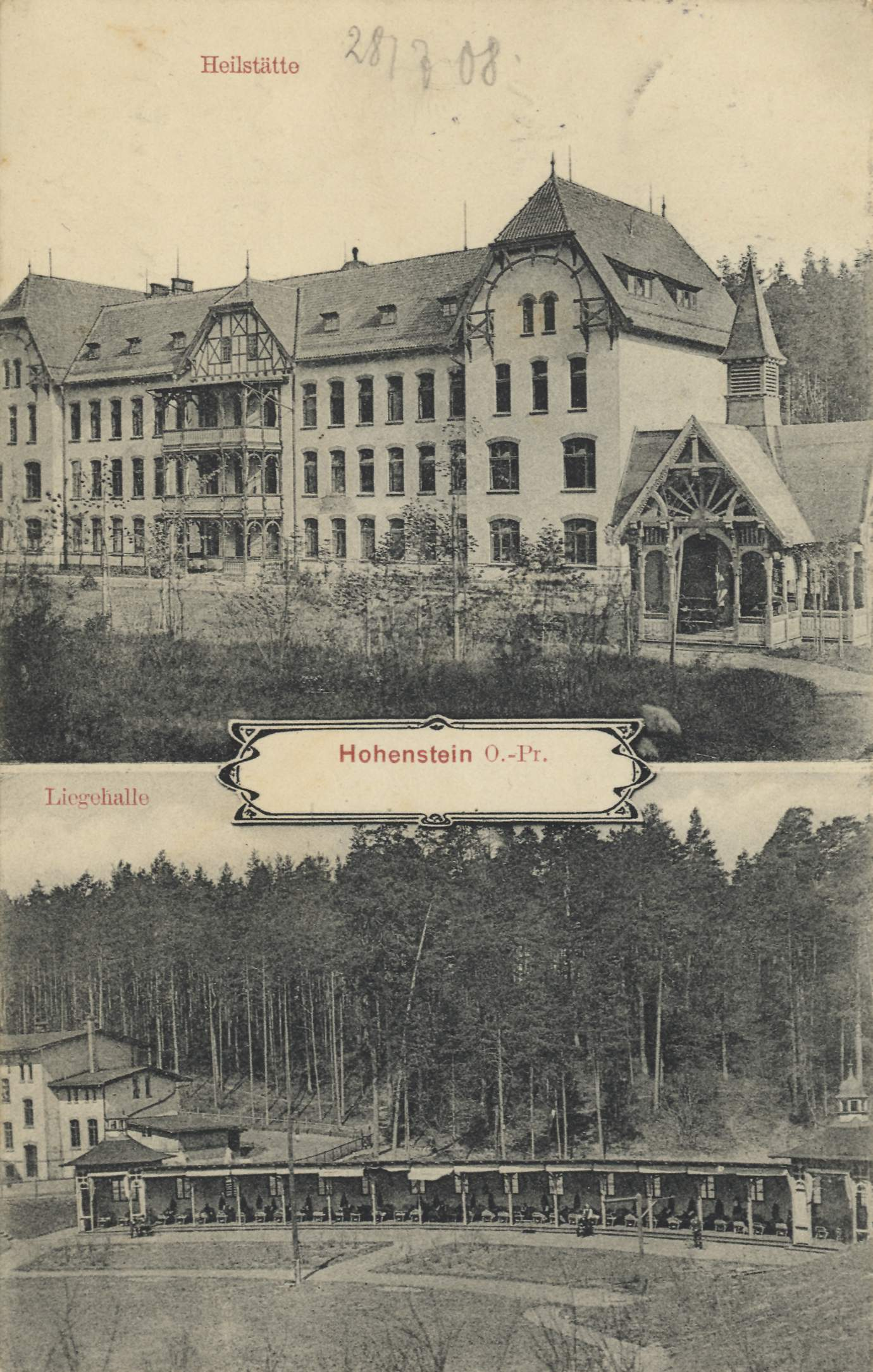
- The sanatorium in 1908

Geography
- Location: Hohenstein, East Prussia (Olsztynek, Poland)
- Coordinates: 53.3702°N 20.1900°E

Services
- Beds: 50; 84; 100 (in World War I)

History
- Opened: 10 January 1903
- Closed: 1933

The Tuberculosis sanatorium Hohenstein (German: Lungenheilstätte Hohenstein) was a sanatorium in Hohenstein, East Prussia (Olsztynek, Poland) specialized in pulmonology and Tuberculosis treatment for male patients. Founded in 1903, it was located about 4 km north of the town center in the municipal forest and closed down in 1933.

The sanatorium was opened by the "Verein zur Errichtung von Lungenheilstätten in Ostpreußen e.V." on 1 October 1903. Initially holding a capacity of 50 beds it was soon expanded to 84 beds in 6 single- and 17 multi-bedrooms including one 10-bed hall in a three-story main building. About 2/3 of the property size of 5 hectares was forested. The surrounding municipal forest of about 450 ha and a small lake was also accessible.

As of 1912 it was operated by the chief physician, Dr. Walther Liévin, an assistant doctor, four nurses and several technical employees. Between 1903 and 1 April 1912 2,282 patients were treated in Hohenstein. Most of the patients were 16 to 30 year old factory- or agricultural labourers from Königsberg, they rarely recovered completely and mostly remained unfit for work.

With the outbreak of World War I all but five severe cases were released on 1. August 1914, the sanatorium re-opened in April 1915, now treating 100 tuberculous soldiers of the Imperial German Army. On account of the war the provisions were tenuous and the number of patients was reduced. In November 1919 69 patients left the sanatorium because of the catastrophic food supplies and the lack of heating. On 18 December 1919 the Königsberg Hartungsche Zeitung reported that fluid medicine was frozen inside the patient's rooms. Due to the bad reputation only about 50 percent of the capacity was occupied in 1920.

On 15 January 1921 the Hartungsche Zeitung reported the "escape" of 35 patients who complained about the lack of food and the general "military" atmosphere under head physician Dr. Liévin. Liévin, father of actor Albert Lieven, was dismissed on 1 July 1921.

Because of the Hyperinflation in the Weimar Republic the sanatorium was temporarily closed in July 1923. The economic situation remained difficult and the hospital was finally closed in 1933.
