= Roger Booth (actor) =

English actor (1933–2014)

- Born: Roger Thomas Booth; 12 November 1933; East Stonehouse, Devon, England
- Died: 26 February 2014 (age 80); London, England
- Occupation: Actor

Roger Thomas Booth (12 November 1933 – 26 February 2014) was an English actor, often on television. He appeared in many British television series and films, which include Z-Cars, No Hiding Place, The Avengers, Robbery, The Tomorrow People, Law & Order, EastEnders, The Bill and others.

His theatre work includes Alan Bleasdale's "Are You Lonesome Tonight?" at the Liverpool Playhouse, and plays with the RSC and the Bristol Old Vic.

== Acting credits ==
| Title | Year | Role | Notes |
|---|---|---|---|
| Z-Cars | 1964 | Hobson | Episode: "Clues Are What You Think" |
| Compact | 1964 | Mr. Rawson | Episode: "Many Questions" |
| Paris 1900 | 1964 | Gendarme | Episode: "Half a Husband" |
| Hereward the Wake | 1965 | Gilbert's Cook | Episode: "The War Arrow" |
| No Hiding Place | 1965 | Insp. Logan | Episode: "The Street" |
| The Avengers | 1965-1967 | 'Porky' Purser / Tubby Vincent | 2 episodes |
| Disneyland | 1966 | Lord Calmsden | 2 episodes |
| ITV Play of the Week | 1967 | Trenchard | Episode: "The Voysey Inheritance" |
| The White Rabbit | 1967 | German orderly on train | Episode: "O Absalom" |
| Robbery | 1967 | Detective | Film, uncredited |
| Orlando | 1968 | Sheik Abu Hassan | Episode: "Orlando and the Return of Moosh: Beau Geste and All That" |
| Work Is a Four-Letter Word | 1968 | Pincher | Film, uncredited |
| ITV Playhouse | 1968 | Porky Leighton | Episode: "The Tigers of Subtopia" |
| The Tyrant King | 1968 | Tourist | 2 episodes |
| Resurrection | 1968 | 3rd Judge | Episode: "Dmitri" |
| Hadleigh | 1969 | Vic Bennett | Episode: "The Wrong Side of the Hill" |
| The First Churchills | 1969 | Bentinck / Portland | 4 episodes |
| Mystery and Imagination | 1970 | Major O'Rooke | Episode: "The Suicide Club" |
| Daniel Deronda | 1970 | Mr. Lush | 3 episodes |
| The Passenger | 1971 | Jack Steen | 1 episode |
| The Trouble with 2B | 1972 | Mr. Grotti | Film |
| Adult Fun | 1972 | Mr. Charles | Film |
| Play for Today | 1972-1982 | Father George / Holland / Tom Barton / Trade union official / Frank | 5 episodes |
| Kidnapped | 1973 | Duke of Cumberland | Film |
| The Tomorrow People | 1973 | Rabowski | 4 episodes |
| Harriet's Back in Town | 1973 | Harry Palmer | 2 episodes |
| The Prince of Denmark | 1974 | Mr. Yates | Unknown episode |
| You're on Your Own | 1975 | Roger Whitby | Episode: "No One Wants Any Trouble" |
| The Main Chance | 1975 | Magnus Tait | Episode: "We're the Bosses Now" |
| Barry Lyndon | 1975 | King George III | Film |
| Yes, Honestly | 1976 | Tug Lavenham | Episode: "Black and White and Red All Over" |
| The Sweeney | 1976 | Ashcroft | Episode: "May" |
| Armchair Thriller | 1978 | C.I.D. Supt. | Episode: "Rachel in Danger: Part 4" |
| A Sharp Intake of Breath | 1978 | Mr. Mathews | Episode: "See You in Court" |
| Law & Order | 1978 | Chief Officer Carne | Episode: "A Prisoner's Tale" |
| The Life Story of Baal | 1978 | Mech | Film |
| Matilda's England | 1979 | Mr. Frye | 3 episodes |
| Secret Army | 1979 | Reichskommissar Glaub | 2 episodes |
| Suez 1956 | 1979 | Peter Thorneycroft | Television film |
| Escape | 1980 | | Episode: "The Cartland Murder" |
| BBC2 Playhouse | 1980 | Major Deans | Episode: "Fatal Spring" |
| Rumpole of the Bailey | 1980 | Alderman Pertwee | Episode: "Rumpole's Return" |
| Remembrance | 1982 | Mark's father | Film |
| The Barchester Chronicles | 1982 | Plomacy | 1 episode |
| The Last Song | 1983 | Bruce | 2 episodes |
| The Nation's Health | 1983 | Staff – Mortuary Technician | Episode: "Chronic" |
| Diana | 1984 | Hawthorn | Episode: "Part Five – May 1937" |
| Kim | 1984 | Father Victor | Television film |
| Dempsey and Makepeace | 1985 | Jack | Episode: "Blind Eye" |
| Lamb | 1985 | Farmer on Train | Film |
| All in Good Faith | 1986 | Poultney | Episode: "No Stone Unturned" |
| Big Deal | 1986 | Mr. Rye | Episode: "Playing the Ace" |
| The Fools on the Hill | 1986 | Commissionaire | Television film |
| Miss Marple: Nemesis | 1987 | Mr. Pelham | 2 episodes |
| Pulaski | 1987 | Buffy Saunders | Episode: "No Guns Please We're British" |
| Inspector Morse | 1988 | Bartender | Episode: "Last Seen Wearing" |
| Blind Justice | 1988 | Arnold Flowers | Episode: "Crime and Punishment" |
| Boon | 1989 | Mr. Hancock | Episode: "Arms and the Dog" |
| Capital City | 1989 | Jerome Heron | Episode: "Max in Space" |
| The Wars of the Roses | 1990-1991 | Earl of Northumberland / Williams / Saunder Simpco / Father / Lord Hastings | 7 episodes |
| Strauss Dynasty | 1991 | | 2 episodes |
| Billy Webb's Amazing Stories | 1991 | Mayor | 2 episodes |
| EastEnders | 1993 | Cab Passenger | 1 episode |
| All or Nothing at All | 1993 | Parishioner | Unknown episodes |
| Cadfael | 1994 | Baldwin Peche | Episode: "The Sanctuary Sparrow" |
| A Pin for the Butterfly | 1994 | Party Guest | Film |
| The Bill | 1994-2003 | Tyrone / Fred McCormack | 2 episodes |
| Cutthroat Island | 1995 | Auctioneer | Film |
| Spark | 1997 | Kimberley's Father | Episode: "Fourth Cousin Kimberley" |
| The Mill on the Floss | 1997 | Mr. Riley | Television film |
| The Famous Five | 1997 | Farmer | Episode: "Five Have a Wonderful Time: Part 1" |
| Doc Martin | 2001 | Boy | Television film |
| Crush | 2001 | Hearty Governor | Film |
| Surrealissimo: The Scandalous Success of Salvador Dali | 2002 | Cafe Owner | Television film |
| My Uncle Silas | 2003 | Lord Chadwell | Episode: "A Funny Thing" |
| Ladies in Lavender | 2004 | Arthur | Film, (final film role) |
