= Fred Haggerty =

British actor and stuntman

- Born: 14 July 1918; Hungary
- Died: 26 July 2002 (aged 84)
- Occupations: Actor; Stuntman
- Notable work: Circus of Horrors; Lifeforce

Fred Haggerty (14 July 1918 – 26 July 2002) was a Hungarian-born British actor and stuntman whose career lasted more than 40 years and took in more than 100 credits on the big and small screen.

== Biography ==
Fred Haggerty appeared in the films Circus of Horrors, Captain Sindbad and Nuns on the Run. He was often booked as a villain and had a short appearance in the series Law & Order. He also worked as a stuntman and performed stunts in such movies as An American Werewolf in London, Lifeforce, Who Framed Roger Rabbit and many James Bond films.

== Partial filmography ==
- Passport to Pimlico (1949) – Man in Crowd (uncredited)
- Captain Horatio Hornblower R.N. (1951, Stunts)
- The Man in the White Suit (1951) – Mill Worker (uncredited)
- Appointment in London (1953) – RAF Officer (uncredited)
- The Titfield Thunderbolt (1953) – Townsman (uncredited)
- Doctor at Sea (1955) – Released Prisoner (uncredited)
- The Cockleshell Heroes (1955) – Marine (uncredited)
- The March Hare (1956) – Racegoer (uncredited)
- The Battle of the River Plate (1956) – Crewman, Admiral Graf Spee (uncredited)
- Up in the World (1956) – Footballer (uncredited)
- Town on Trial (1957) – Man at Dance (uncredited)
- A Night to Remember (1958, Stunts) – Passenger (uncredited)
- The Headless Ghost (1959) – Medieval Ghost (uncredited)
- The Mouse That Roared (1959) – Fenwickian (uncredited)
- Circus of Horrors (1960) – Second Roustabout (uncredited)
- There Was a Crooked Man (1960) – (uncredited)
- Tunes of Glory (1960, Stunt coordinator) – Sergeant (uncredited)
- Very Important Person (1961) – German Guard (uncredited)
- Operation Snafu (1961) – Airman (uncredited)
- Captain Sindbad (1963)
- The Scarlet Blade (1963) – Soldier (uncredited)
- From Russia with Love (1963) – Krilencu
- Carry On Spying (1964) – Dr. Crow's Assistant (uncredited)
- The Gorgon (1964) – Constable (uncredited)
- Casino Royale (1967) – Man in Casino (uncredited)
- A Challenge for Robin Hood (1967) – Man at arms (uncredited)
- Quatermass and the Pit (1967) – Fleeing Man (uncredited)
- The Bunny Caper (1974) – 2nd Guardsman
- The Pink Panther Strikes Again (1976) – Munich Hotel Doorman
- The Spy Who Loved Me (1977, Stunts) – Stromberg Henchman (uncredited)
- Candleshoe (1977) – Hood (uncredited)
- Revenge of the Pink Panther (1978) – Attendant (uncredited)
- Nuns on the Run (1990) – Gatekeeper (final film role)
