= Whistle and I'll Come to You =

Whistle and I'll Come to You may refer to:

- Whistle and I'll Come to You (1968 film), a supernatural short television film
- Whistle and I'll Come to You (2010 film), a short film, part of the British supernatural anthology series “A Ghost Story for Christmas”

== See also ==
- 'Oh, Whistle, and I'll Come to You, My Lad', a ghost story by British writer M. R. James
- Oh, whistle and I'll come to you, my lad, the title and refrain of a poem and song by Robert Burns
