= The Stalls of Barchester =

1971 British television ghost story

- Title screen, showing Barchester Cathedral. Doctor Black is seen passing through the arch.
- Based on: "The Stalls of Barchester Cathedral" by M. R. James
- Written by: Lawrence Gordon Clark
- Directed by: Lawrence Gordon Clark
- Starring: Robert Hardy as Archdeacon Haynes; Clive Swift as Dr. Black; Thelma Barlow as Letitia Haynes; Will Leighton as Cathedral Librarian; Harold Bennett as Archdeacon Pulteney; Erik Chitty as Priest; David Pugh as John; Ambrose Coghill as Museum Curator

Production
- Producer: Lawrence Gordon Clark
- Running time: 45 minutes

Original release
- Release: 24 December 1971

Related
- A Ghost Story for Christmas

The Stalls of Barchester is a short film which serves as the first of the British supernatural anthology series A Ghost Story for Christmas. Written, produced, and directed by the series' creator Lawrence Gordon Clark, it is based on the ghost story "The Stalls of Barchester Cathedral" by M. R. James, first published in the collection More Ghost Stories of an Antiquary (1911). It stars Robert Hardy as Archdeacon Haynes of the fictional Barchester Cathedral, whose mysterious death is investigated 50 years later by the scholar Dr. Black (Clive Swift), and first aired on BBC1 on 24 December 1971.

Clark was inspired to initiate the series by Whistle and I'll Come to You (1968), based on a James story and directed by Jonathan Miller for the BBC documentary strand Omnibus, and the oral tradition of telling ghost stories at Christmas of which James' stories were a part. It was commissioned by Paul Fox and, like Miller's film, produced by the BBC Documentary Unit; Clark's approach was likewise inspired by his background as a documentarian, particularly his insistence on location shooting at Norwich Cathedral on colour 16mm film, which would become hallmarks of the series' original run.

Since airing, the film has received praise as a work of supernatural television and horror cinema, and as a strong inaugural instalment of what would become a long-running strand.

== Plot ==
Whilst cataloguing the library of Barchester Cathedral in 1932, a scholar, Dr Black (Clive Swift) is shown a box containing a 50-year-old diary (sealed under the order of the Dean) detailing the events leading up to the mysterious death of Dr Haynes (Robert Hardy), a former Archdeacon of the cathedral. From the diary, Dr Black is able to piece together how the murder of Haynes' agéd predecessor, a 17th-century carving on the cathedral choir stalls and the appearance of a large black cat ultimately cursed the former archdeacon. It is implied that Dr Haynes caused the death of his aged predecessor, and therefore falls under the curse of "Austin the Twice-Born", a carver who made the wooden decorations (the Devil, death and a black cat) of the cathedral's Archdeacon's stall from oak brought from a nearby wood and from a tree known locally as "The Hanging Oak".

== Cast ==
The cast includes several actors now better known for their roles in situation comedies, or lighter dramas.

- Clive Swift as Dr. Black
- Will Leighton as the cathedral librarian
- Robert Hardy as Dr. Haynes
- Thelma Barlow as Letitia Haynes
- Harold Bennett as Archdeacon Pulteney
- Erik Chitty as the priest
- David Pugh as John
- Ambrose Coghill as museum curator

== Production ==
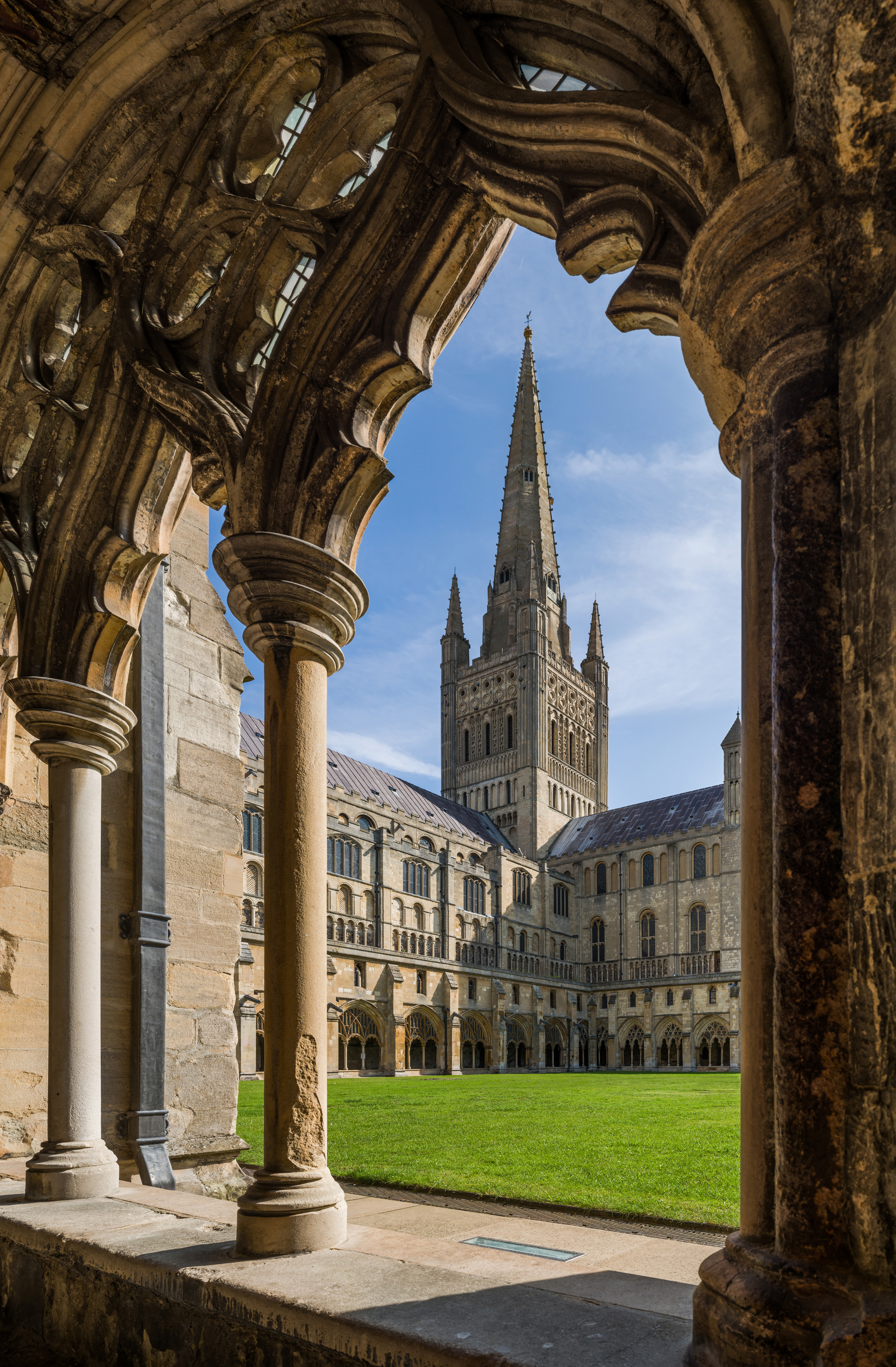
Norwich Cathedral's spire and south transept viewed from the cloisters.

In adapting the story for film, Clark set the story of the Archdeacon within the frame narrative of Dr Black's discovery of his diary, and the scholar's subsequent investigation into the origin of the carvings. Unlike the original story, the supernatural elements are shown, as opposed to being implied by the diary, albeit in shadowy glimpses. The adaptation was filmed on location at Norwich Cathedral and the surrounding cathedral close. Unusually for a BBC television drama of the 1970s, both interior and exteriors in "The Stalls of Barchester" were originated on 16 mm film, as opposed to the standard studio videotape for interiors. As a result of this, cameraman John McGlashan was able to make use of night shoots in dark, shadowy cloisters and rooms.

The choir of Norwich Cathedral is featured during the scenes of the Anglican Evensong service, and the Nunc dimittis ("Lord, thou lettest now thy servant depart in peace") sung to the setting in A by Samuel Arnold, Richard Ayleward's Preces and Responses, Jan Pieterszoon Sweelinck's Variations on Mein junges Leben hat ein End ("My young life has come to an end") and Henry Smart's Cathedral Psalter chant for Psalm 109 ("Let his days be few; and let another take his office") are used as a storytelling device.

== Home video ==
"The Stalls of Barchester" was first released on DVD in Australia in 2011 by Shock Entertainment as part of the box set The Complete Ghost Stories of M. R. James.

In 2012, to mark the 150th anniversary of James' birth, "The Stalls of Barchester" was released on DVD by the BFI alongside A Warning to the Curious (1972) in the same release, and the entire run of A Ghost Story for Christmas from 1971-2010 was released in a DVD box set, which was updated the following year to include additional material. All three releases featured an essay on The Stalls of Barchester by film historian Jonathan Rigby and a filmed introduction by Lawrence Gordon Clark.

In 2022 it was remastered in 2k resolution by the BFI and released on Blu-ray alongside "Whistle and I'll Come to You" (1968 and 2010), "A Warning to the Curious", and "Lost Hearts" (1973) as Ghost Stories for Christmas - Volume 1. This included Jonathan Rigby's essay, the Lawrence Gordon Clark introduction, and a newly-recorded commentary by critics Kim Newman and Sean Hogan.
