= David Pugh (actor) =

British actor (died 2022)

He was a British actor (died 21 June 2022) probably best known for playing opposite Rosamund Greenwood and Roy Evans in an acclaimed early film by director Tony Scott, Loving Memory, which was shown at the 1971 Cannes Film Festival. Other film roles included Daft Jamie in Burke & Hare (1971), one of the leads in the 1972 sex comedy The Love Pill, and a creditor in Christine Edzard's 1987 Dickens adaptation, Little Dorrit.

Among his stage credits were Lock Up Your Daughters (Mermaid Theatre, 1969), Yepihodov in The Cherry Orchard (Riverside Studios, 1978) and a 1978-79 spell at London's National Theatre, appearing in plays by Shakespeare, Edward Bond, John Galsworthy and Leo Tolstoy. Television roles, spanning the period from 1968 to 1993, include Pathfinders (1972), The Adventures of Black Beauty (1973), The Death of Glory in the Armchair Theatre series (1973), Robert's Robots (1974), Out of Bounds (1977), Poldark (1977), both The First Part of Henry The Sixt and The Second Part of Henry The Sixt in the BBC Shakespeare series (1983), and The Citadel (1983).

Pugh also appeared in three of the BBC's classic Ghost Story for Christmas adaptations, playing John in The Stalls of Barchester (first shown on 24 December 1971), the porter in A Warning to the Curious (24 December 1972) and a herdsman in The Ash Tree (23 December 1975).

Pugh's death was announced by the entertainment union Equity in June 2022.

== Filmography ==
- Loving Memory (1971) as Mr Speke, Young Man
- Burke and Hare (1971) as Daft Jamie
- The Love Pill (1972) as Arnold Crudleigh
- The Sex Thief (1973) as second reporter
- Secrets of a Super Stud (1976) as Cousin Henry
- Little Dorrit (1987) as Mr Parker - a creditor
