= A Warning to the Curious (film) =

1972 British television ghost story

- Title screen
- Based on: "A Warning to the Curious" by M. R. James
- Written by: Lawrence Gordon Clark
- Directed by: Lawrence Gordon Clark
- Starring: Peter Vaughan as Paxton; Clive Swift as Dr. Black; John Kearney as William Ager; David Cargill as Boots; George Benson as Vicar; Roger Milner as Antique Shop Owner; Gilly Fraser as Girl at Cottage; David Pugh as Station Porter

Production
- Producer: Lawrence Gordon Clark
- Running time: 50 minutes

Original release
- Release: 24 December 1972

Related
- A Ghost Story for Christmas

A Warning to the Curious is a short film, the second of the British supernatural anthology series A Ghost Story for Christmas. Written, produced, and directed by the series' creator, Lawrence Gordon Clark, it is based on the ghost story of the same name by M. R. James, first published in the collection A Warning to the Curious and Other Ghost Stories (1925) and first aired on BBC1 on 24 December 1972. At 50 minutes it is the longest instalment in the series' original run.

It stars Peter Vaughan as Paxton, an amateur archaeologist whose attempt to track down one of the three legendary crowns of East Anglia causes him to be followed by the ghost of its last guardian, William Ager (John Kearney). He seeks the assistance of the vacationing scholar Dr. Black (Clive Swift) in order to return the crown and end the haunting.

Since airing, the episode has received critical acclaim as one of the best in the series, and one of the greatest works of horror television ever made. It was the last to be written and produced by Clark under the BBC Documentary Unit; starting with the following year's "Lost Hearts", the series would be produced by Rosemary Hill under the Drama Department, and other writers would be brought in. Though the series is traditionally regarded as airing on Christmas Eve, this was the last episode to do so until Whistle and I'll Come to You (2010).

== Synopsis ==
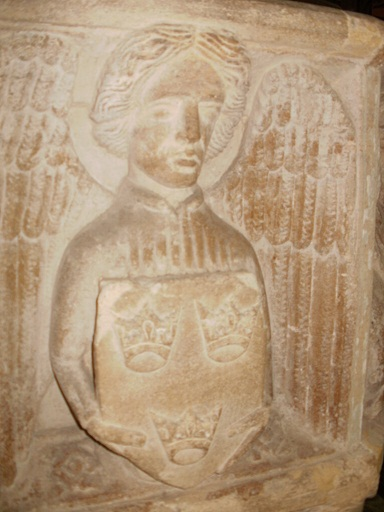
Three crowns emblem at Saxmundham parish church, Suffolk, England

In the 1930s the recently made unemployed Paxton (Peter Vaughan), an amateur archaeologist who has fallen on hard times during the Great Depression, travels to a remote seaside town in Norfolk to search for one of the three lost crowns of East Anglia, which, according to legend, protect the East Anglian coast from invasion. Paxton tracks down the location of the buried crown by discovering that the local Ager family have been the guardians of the crown and its burial site for generations. The last of the family was William Ager (John Kearney), who had died a few years previously. Upon unearthing the crown, Paxton is stalked by its supernatural guardian.

Realising the danger he is in, Paxton, with the assistance of his fellow hotel guest Dr Black (Clive Swift), reburies the crown in an attempt to appease the wrathful guardian spirit that watches over it; but the two men greatly underestimate the punishment that awaits those who are curious enough to dig for the crown.

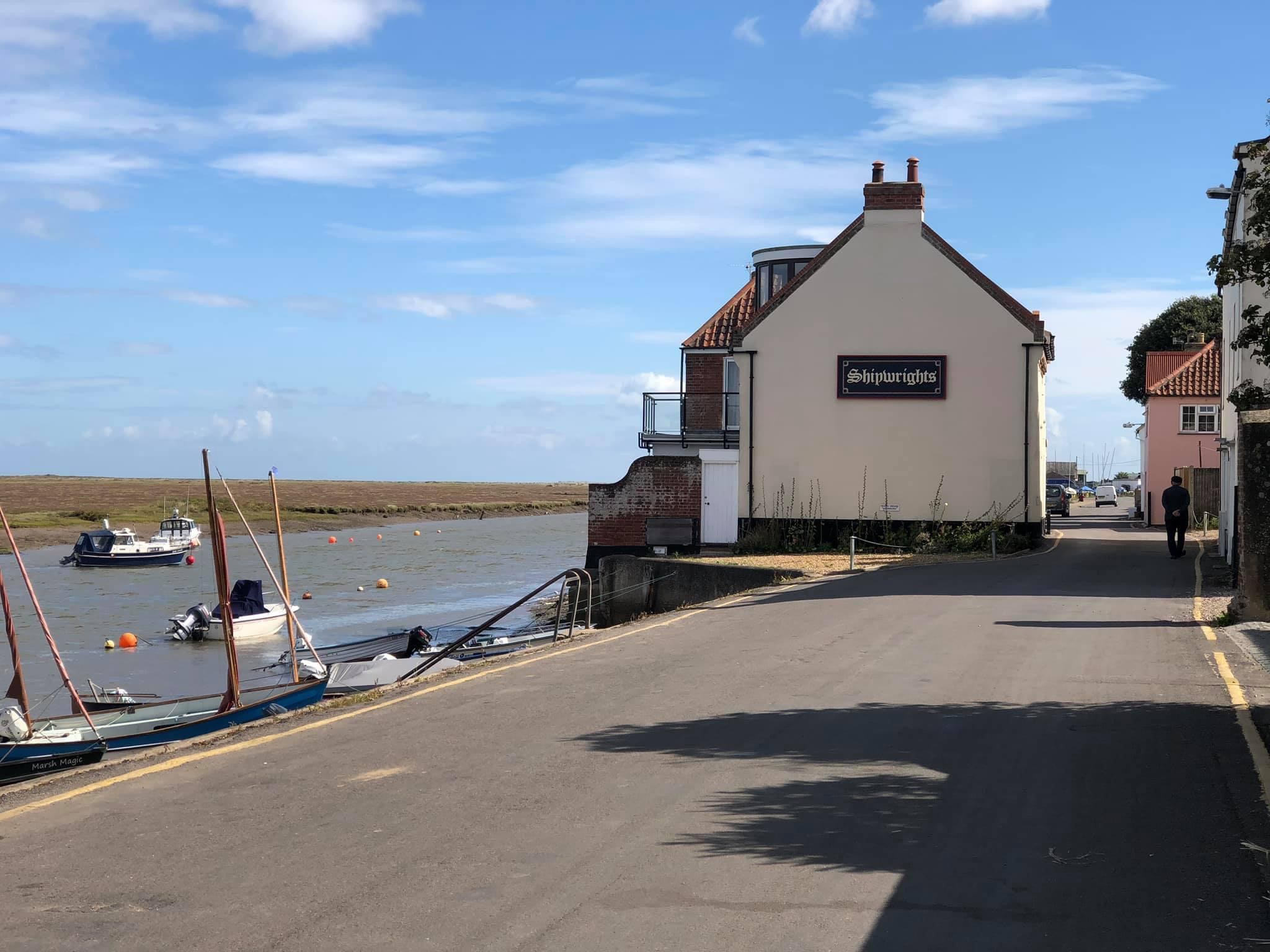
The Shipwrights Arms at Wells-next-the-Sea was used as a location in the drama

== Cast ==
- Peter Vaughan as Mr Paxton
- Clive Swift as Dr. Black
- Julian Herington as Archaeologist
- John Kearney as Ager / The Guardian
- David Cargill as Boots
- George Benson as Vicar
- Roger Milner as antique shop owner
- Gilly Fraser as girl at cottage
- David Pugh as station porter
- Cyril Appleton as labourer

== Production ==
In adapting the story, Clark changed the protagonist of the original from a young, innocent amateur who discovers the crown by accident to a middle-aged man (Peter Vaughan) who travels to Seaburgh specifically to find the crown. The era is updated to 1929, the background of the Depression adding an extra layer to Paxton's search for the treasure. The narrative layering of the original James story is dispensed with and a chronological narrative is used instead. Clark noted in a 2014 interview that he tried to make A Warning to the Curious as "essentially, a silent film, with the tension building slowly throughout the visual images".

Clark also included the character of Dr. Black (Clive Swift), who first appeared in "The Stalls of Barchester".

=== Locations ===
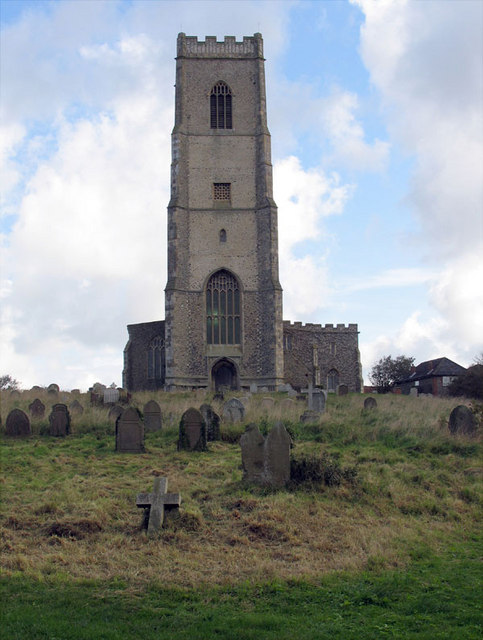
"It is a fine porch, isn't it?" St Mary's Church in Happisburgh, Norfolk, a film location in "A Warning to the Curious".

For "A Warning to the Curious", "Seaburgh" (a disguised version of Aldeburgh, Suffolk) was filmed on the coast of North Norfolk at Holkham Beach and Holkham Wood at Holkham Gap, Happisburgh, Wells-next-the-Sea and at the Sheringham and Weybourne stations of the North Norfolk Railway. Clark recalls filming in North Norfolk in late February, with consistently fine cold weather "with a slight winter haze which gave exactly the right depth and sense of mystery to the limitless vistas of the shoreline there."

=== Music ===
A Warning to a Curious did not have an original score composed for it, but although Clark talks about using "stock music", Adam Scovell, analysing the aural aesthetics of the BBC Ghost Stories, notes that the film makes use of what were then new, avant-garde classical works found in the BBC's gramophone library at Egton House. György Ligeti's Atmosphères in particular is used within the film to signify the presence of the ghost of William Ager.

- Atmosphères - Symphony Orchestra of the Southwest German Radio, Baden Baden; Conductor: Ernest Bour (György Ligeti) [Heliodor – 2549 003]
- Density 21.5 - Flute: Severino Gazzelloni (Edgard Varèse) [Heliodor – 2549 002]
- Concerto for Cello and Orchestra - Hessian Radio Symphony Orchestra; Cello: Siegfried Palm; Conductor: Michael Gielen (György Ligeti) [Heliodor – 2549 004]
- Streichquartett No. 2 (i): Allegro Nervoso" and "(iv): Presto Furioso, Brutale, Tumultoso" - LaSalle-Quartett; Cello: Jack Kirstein (György Ligeti) [Deutsche Grammophon, Avantgarde 2561 040]

== Home video ==
"A Warning to the Curious" was first released on home video by the BFI alongside separate releases of "Whistle and I'll Come to You" (1968) and "The Signalman" (1976) on VHS in 2002 and DVD in 2003. It was released on DVD in Australia in 2011 by Shock Entertainment as part of the box set The Complete Ghost Stories of M. R. James.

In 2012, to mark the 150th anniversary of James' birth, it was rereleased on DVD by the BFI, now alongside "The Stalls of Barchester" (1971) in the same release, and the entire run of A Ghost Story for Christmas from 1971-2010 was released in a DVD box set, which was updated the following year to include additional material. All three releases featured an essay on "A Warning to the Curious" by writer Adam Easterbrook and a filmed introduction by Lawrence Gordon Clark.

In 2022 it was remastered in 2k resolution by the BFI and released on Blu-ray alongside "Whistle and I'll Come to You" (1968 and 2010), "The Stalls of Barchester", and "Lost Hearts" (1973) as Ghost Stories for Christmas - Volume 1. This included Adam Easterbrook's essay, the Lawrence Gordon Clark introduction, and a newly-recorded commentary by TV historian Jon Dear.
