= The Stalls of Barchester Cathedral =

Ghost story by M.R. James

- Short story by M. R. James
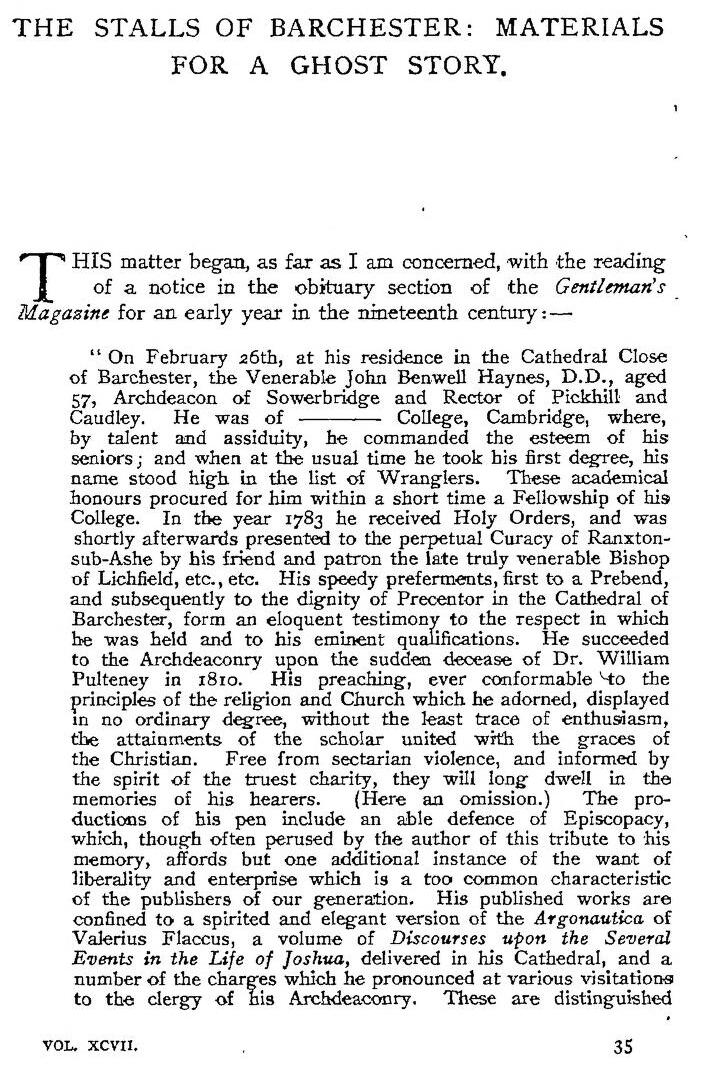
- The first page of "The Stalls of Barchester Cathedral" from its original publication in The Contemporary Review.

Text available at Wikisource
- Country: England
- Language: English
- Genre: Horror

Publication
- Published in: The Contemporary Review
- Publication date: April 1910

"The Stalls of Barchester Cathedral" is a ghost story by British writer M. R. James, first published in The Contemporary Review in 1910, and collected in James' books More Ghost Stories of an Antiquary (1910) and The Collected Ghost Stories of M. R. James (1931). It concerns carvings on a prayer desk in Barchester Cathedral which result in supernatural vengeance. It was adapted for television by BBC1 in 1971 as part of its series A Ghost Story for Christmas and by BBC Scotland in 2000 as part of its Christopher Lee's Ghost Stories For Christmas, and for radio by BBC Radio 4 in 2018.

== Plot summary ==
In the framing device for the story, the unnamed narrator reads an obituary published in The Gentleman's Magazine in the early nineteenth century for The Venerable John Benwell Haynes, D.D., the Archdeacon of Sowerbridge and Rector of Pickhill and Candley, who died suddenly at his home in the cathedral close of Barchester. Dr. Haynes had succeeded to the Archdeaconry in 1810 upon the death of his predecessor, Archdeacon Pulteney. While cataloguing manuscripts in a library of the University of Cambridge, the narrator happens across a tin box labelled "Papers of the Ven. Archdeacon Haynes. Bequeathed in 1834 by his sister, Miss Letitia Haynes." Granting the narrator permission to examine the contents of the box, the librarian notes that the former master of the library had forbidden the box to ever be opened. The narrator examines the contents of the box, and receives permission from the librarian to publish a story based on them, provided he anonymises the people in question.

+ + +

Dr. Haynes is appointed Archdeacon in 1810 when Archdeacon Pulteney dies from falling down the stairs of his house and breaking his neck; the accident is attributed to his maid, Jane, failing to mention a missing stair rod (later found under the stair's carpet). Upon taking up his duties, Dr. Haynes finds that the affairs of the archdeaconry are in poor order, with uncollected dues, no visitation having been held for seven years, and four chancels in disrepair; in a letter to a friend, he rudely refers to Pulteney as "ὁ κατέχων". (Note: Greek for "the one who withholds". A quotation from the Second Epistle to the Thessalonians.) He estimates that it will take three years to rectify the business of the archdeaconry. Dr. Haynes is very talented and performs the duties of his office with great zeal.

Shortly after being appointed Archdeacon, Dr. Haynes begins making quarterly payments of £25 (equivalent to £1,697 in 2025) to "J.L.". After receiving an undated letter from Jane Lee requesting a payment of £40 (equivalent to £2,716 in 2025) towards the rent of a farm "otherwise steps will have to be took which I should not wish", Dr. Haynes makes a further payment of £40 to J.L..

The choir of Barchester Cathedral in the narrator's time is described as "a very bare and odiously furnished place", with modern stalls and a metal and marble screen designed by Sir Gilbert Scott. 100 years prior, during Dr. Haynes' tenure, the choir was significantly more elaborate, with "classical" stalls and a wooden altar screen. The prayer desk of the archdeacon's stall featured "three small but remarkable statuettes in the grotesque manner". The statuettes respectively depict a cat; a robed, bethroned, taloned, horned figure of "Tartarean origin"; and a cowled figure wearing a halter, identified as the "King of Terrors". Research by Dr. Haynes suggests that the prayer desk may have been carved from the "Hanging Oak", a dule tree from a nearby copse that was found to have many human bones buried around its roots, and which "it was the custom for those who wished to secure a successful issue to their affairs, whether of love or the ordinary business of life, to suspend from its boughs small images or puppets rudely fashioned of straw, twigs, or the like rustic materials."

As the years pass, Dr. Haynes' diaries reveal "a shadow coming over him", with his mood worsening later in the year when his sister is living in Brighton and when the days are shorter. In November 1816, while resting his hand on the cat carving on the prayer desk, Dr. Haynes seems to feel "a softness, a feeling as of rather rough and coarse fur, and a sudden movement, as if the creature were twisting round its head to bite me." Over the following months, Dr. Haynes experiences various uncanny experiences in the Cathedral house, including hearing voices and feeling an unseen cat slip between his legs. The events peak one evening in February 1817, when "the hall and staircase seemed to be unusually full of what I can only call movement without sound". While waiting in his room for a letter to be collected for delivery, Dr. Haynes hears a knock on the door and a voice saying, "May I come in?"; he replies "Certainly: come in" and opens the door, but finds no-one there.

Dr. Haynes' mood improves in spring 1817 when his sister returns, but worsens when she leaves again in September 1817. In October, when resting his hand on one of the carvings on the prayer desk, Dr. Haynes feels "the wood seemed to become chilly and soft as if made of wet linen" as the choir sing verse six of Psalm 109. (Note: "Set thou a wicked man over him: and let Satan stand at his right hand.") Dr. Haynes hears whispering in his house, and has the sensation of a cat on the stairs. In November, he awakens from sleep to find himself standing on the stairs. In December and January, Dr. Haynes' "firmness began to give way under the pressure of these phenomena". In January 1818, Dr. Haynes' cousin Allen comes to visit him; Allen complains of noises in the house, reports seeing a "wild" cat, and sees a "maid" wearing a grey or white dress passing through a door. After Allen departs on 11 January, Dr. Haynes repeatedly writes "I must be firm" in his diary. On 26 February 1818, Dr. Haynes is found dead on the landing of the Cathedral house's staircase, with his spinal column fractured in several places and his eyes, mouth, and nose disfigured "as if by the agency of some savage animal"; the cause of the injuries cannot be determined.

+ + +

The narrator concludes that Dr. Haynes had arranged the murder of Dr. Pulteney, but is unclear of the role the carved figures from the stall played in Dr. Haynes' death. Visiting a museum in Barchester, the narrator learns from the curator that an elderly resident of Barchester had obtained a fragment of the carved figures from a wood yard; he found a scrap of paper inside the carving, which he gave to the curator. The paper reads:

"When I grew in the Wood
I was water'd wth Blood
Now in the Church I stand
Who that touches me with his Hand
If a Bloody hand he bear
I councell him to be ware
Lest he be fetcht away
Whether by night or day,
But chiefly when the wind blows high
In a night of February."
"This I drempt, 26 Febr. AO 1699. John Austin."

== Publication ==
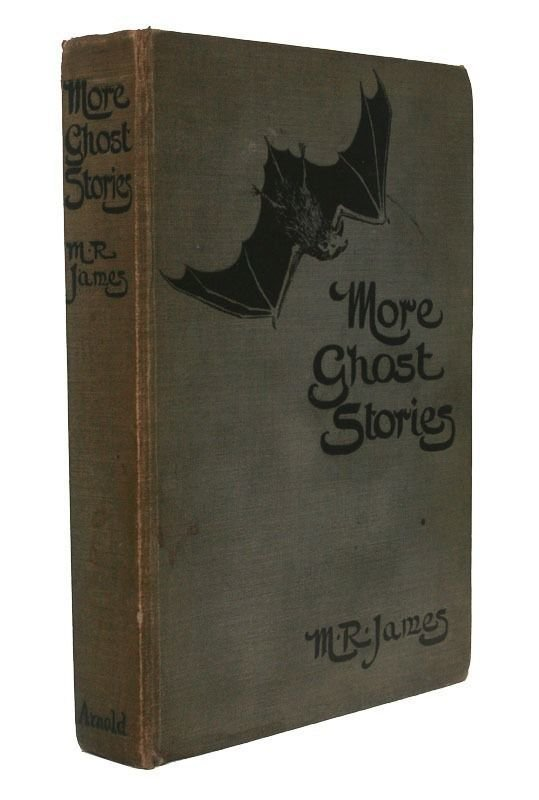
"The Stalls of Barchester Cathedral" was collected in James' book More Ghost Stories of an Antiquary in 1910

"The Stalls of Barchester Cathedral" was first published in volume 97 of The Contemporary Review in April 1910. Later that year, it was collected in James' book More Ghost Stories of an Antiquary. In 1931, it was again collected in James' book The Collected Ghost Stories of M. R. James. It has since been anthologised many times. The setting of Barchester is a reference to Anthony Trollope's Chronicles of Barsetshire novels.

== Reception ==
J. S. Barnes comments, "Haynes's comeuppance is dreadfully appropriate, the occult mechanism that has brought about his fate revealed only in an arch coda".

Jane Mainley-Piddock suggests that James uses Dr. Haynes' character "to illustrate evil twisting the idea of religious duty", and to explore the idea of hypocrisy in religion. Mainley-Piddock further writes "the ability of the church to dispense justice to the murderer of Dr Pulteney is seen to be in some doubt, as the hanging oak carvings are symbolic of paganism".

== Adaptations ==
Gerald Heard's novel The Black Fox, published in 1950, is an occult thriller inspired by "The Stalls of Barchester Cathedral".

The story was adapted by Lawrence Gordon Clark for BBC's A Ghost Story for Christmas as The Stalls of Barchester. Airing on BBC1 on 24 December 1971, it starred Robert Hardy as Archdeacon Haynes.

A dramatized narration of the story with Christopher Lee as James was produced by BBC Scotland in 2000 as part of the series Christopher Lee's Ghost Stories For Christmas, adapted by Ronald Frame.

On 19 December 2018, a radio drama adaptation titled The Haunting of MR James: The Stalls of Barchester Cathedral by Neil Brand aired on BBC Radio 4. It starred Mark Gatiss as M. R. James and Sean Baker as Archdeacon Haynes.
