= Whistle and I'll Come to You (2010 film) =

British television ghost story

- John Hurt as James Parkin
- Based on: "Oh, Whistle, and I'll Come to You, My Lad" by M. R. James
- Written by: Neil Cross
- Directed by: Andy De Emmony
- Starring: John Hurt as James Parkin; Gemma Jones as Alice Parkin; Lesley Sharp as Hetty; Sophie Thompson as Carol

Production
- Producer: Claire Armspach
- Running time: 52 minutes

Original release
- Release: 24 December 2010

Related
- A Ghost Story for Christmas

Whistle and I'll Come to You is a short film which is part of the British supernatural anthology series A Ghost Story for Christmas. Written by Neil Cross, produced by Claire Armspach, and directed by Andy De Emmony, it is based on the ghost story of the same name by M. R. James, first published in the collection Ghost Stories of an Antiquary (1904), and first aired on BBC Two on 24 December 2010. At 52 minutes it is the longest entry in the series' history.

It stars John Hurt as James Parkin, an introverted academic who goes on a respite holiday after leaving his wife Alice (Gemma Jones), who is in the advanced stages of dementia, in a care home. When he finds a wedding ring on a beach, he starts to be haunted by a mysterious spectre.

It is the second major adaptation of James' story, following the 1968 version directed by Jonathan Miller for the BBC documentary strand Omnibus, which directly inspired Lawrence Gordon Clark to create A Ghost Story for Christmas in 1971. This version significantly changes the story of both the short story and the earlier film, replacing the whistle found in a Knights Templar cemetery on the East Anglian coast with a wedding ring, but hints at Robert Burns' original Scottish folk song "Oh, whistle and I'll come to you, my lad", which Hurt's character recites at the beginning of the story to his wife and is played over the end credits.

It received mixed reviews from critics and audiences for the deviations from earlier versions of the story, though John Hurt's performance was widely praised.

== Plot ==
In this version, retired astronomer James Parkin goes on a respite holiday after leaving his aged wife (who appears to be in the advanced stages of dementia) in a care home. When revisiting one of their favourite coastal towns during the off-season, he goes for a walk on the beach and discovers a wedding ring in the sand, which he keeps. As he is walking back along the desolate beach to his hotel, he senses he is being followed and sees a motionless white-clad figure in the distance behind him. As he walks further, the seemingly motionless figure gets closer to him each time he turns to look back. Nervous, he runs back to the steps away from the beach but as he turns around again, the figure has disappeared. Back at his hotel room, he cleans the ring he has found and sees it is inscribed with the Latin words "Quis est qui venit?"("Who is this, who is coming?") which he reads out loud. Later that night, he is awakened by noises. Initially this seems to be caused by a storm outside but he then hears scratching noises inside his room. He goes back to sleep with his bedside lamp turned on but when he awakens later, the lamp is off again.

The next morning, he dismisses the scratching noises as a rat and the lamp as having a loose connection, both of which he asks the hotel receptionist to investigate. He begins to venture out to the beach again but once he gets there he becomes hesitant and decides to spend the day elsewhere instead. That night, Parkin falls asleep while reading in bed. He is awakened in the night again by strange noises and finds his bedside lamp is once again turned off even though he fell asleep with it on. This time, someone tries to enter his hotel room. Though they are unsuccessful, he feels shaken by the incident. Eventually, he manages to fall asleep again but has a disturbing dream that involves his wife, a young child and the figure on the beach.

Early the next morning, he tells the hotel receptionist that he believes one of the other guests tried to get into his room but she tells him that he was alone in the hotel, with no other guests or even staff present. Though his scientific mind refuses to acknowledge the existence of the spiritual or supernatural (he refuses to believe in the idea of his wife's spirit being trapped in her almost functionless body like a "ghost in the machine"), he becomes increasingly uneasy during the remainder of his stay at the hotel. Later that day, he is again followed by the ominous white-clad figure on the otherwise empty beach. Panicked, he runs back to the hotel and decides to leave the following day.

The night before he is due to depart, Parkin struggles to relax in his hotel room. He picks up the ring he found on the beach but quickly tries to dispel any irrational thoughts he is having and eventually falls asleep. Later in the night, he is once again awakened by the scratching sounds and then something trying to enter his hotel room. This time, an apparition enters his room from underneath the door. As his bedside lamp goes off again by itself, Parkin shuts his eyes in terror and implores the apparition to leave him alone. As he opens his eyes he sees a figure sitting on the end of his bed. The figure appears to be his wife, who angrily says over and over again "I'm still here" as she crawls towards him. Parkin tries in vain to escape, his fingernails scratching on the wooden floor making a sound identical to the scratching noises he kept hearing. The following morning, the receptionist finds Parkin lying dead in his bed, while his wife seemingly vanishes from the care home.

== Cast ==
- John Hurt – James Parkin
- Gemma Jones – Alice Parkin
- Lesley Sharp – Hetty, the nurse
- Sophie Thompson – Carol, the hotel receptionist

== Production ==
Various scenes were filmed at Kingsgate Bay and Botany Bay both in the Isle of Thanet, Kent, England. The music for this adaptation was composed by Tristin Norwell and Nick Green.

== Reception ==
Sam Wollaston, writing in The Guardian was mixed in his review, criticising some of the changes ("His terrifying short story has been much tampered with. The whistle ... is missing mysteriously ... Even the shoreline is wrong; it should be the east coast: dunes, windswept. This looks like Dorset."). He praised John Hurt's performance, calling it "a masterclass in how to captivate" and noting that despite the changes "what survives ... is the spirit of the story – a man, alone by the sea, haunted, pursued by something. It is terrifying".

== Home video ==
"Whistle and I'll Come to You" was first released on DVD in Australia in 2011 by Shock Entertainment as part of the box set The Complete Ghost Stories of M. R. James.

In 2012, to mark the 150th anniversary of James' birth, "Whistle and I'll Come to You" was released on DVD by the BFI alongside the 1968 adaptation in the same release, and the entire run of A Ghost Story for Christmas from 1971-2010 was released in a DVD box set, which was updated the following year to include additional material. All three releases featured an essay on Whistle and I'll Come to You by TV historian Jon Dear.

In 2022 it was remastered in 2k resolution by the BFI and released on Blu-ray alongside "Whistle and I'll Come to You" (1968), "The Stalls of Barchester" (1971), "A Warning to the Curious" (1972), and "Lost Hearts" (1973) as Ghost Stories for Christmas - Volume 1. This included Jon Dear's essay.
