= Loving Memory =

- Directed by: Tony Scott
- Written by: Tony Scott
- Starring: Rosamund Greenwood; Roy Evans; David Pugh
- Cinematography: Chris Menges; John Metcalfe; Tony Scott
- Edited by: Tony Scott; John Sharrad
- Production companies: British Film Institute; Memorial Enterprises; Scott Free Productions
- Release dates: 21 September 1970 (NFT London); May 1971 (Cannes Film Festival)
- Running time: 52 minutes
- Country: United Kingdom
- Language: English
- Budget: £12,500

Loving Memory is a 1970 British black and white psychological drama film written and directed by Tony Scott (as Anthony Scott) and starring Rosamund Greenwood, Roy Evans and David Pugh. The 52 minute film was made 12 years before Scott's feature directorial debut The Hunger (1983).

It was shown at the 1971 Cannes Film Festival.

== Plot ==
An elderly couple, who turn out to be brother and sister, are left traumatized by the Second World War. It is revealed that they were involved in the accidental death of a bicycle rider. Instead of reporting the accident, they bring the body home.

== Cast ==
- Rosamund Greenwood as Ambrose's sister
- Roy Evans as Ambrose
- David Pugh as Mr Speke, young man

== Production ==
Of the budget, £6,500 came from Albert Finney's Memorial Enterprises, £6,000 from the BFI. £3,000 of that came from a grant from the Vivien Leigh Memorial Fund.

== Critical reception ==
The Monthly Film Bulletin wrote: "Loving Memory tells the story of a weird couple living out of time in a setting which makes the whole macabre business quite believable for fifty-seven minutes. There is no place in this film for such disciplines as period accuracy, nor such realities as rigor mortis, police investigations of missing persons, putrefying cups of tea or the inhuman strength required to push a body in a heavy wooden coffin up a stony hillside. Yet the story succeeds because of its realistic observation of life in a deserted valley in Yorkshire. ... Chris Menges' photography perfectly captures the misty loneliness of the moors, and some of the picture composition is magnificent. ... As with One of the Missing, the film's theme is death, something to be welcomed not feared. Rosamund Greenwood's performance in this respect strikes just the right balance between sanity and lunacy."

Sight and Sound wrote: "This compact, beautifully crafted and atmospheric Yorkshire chiller was Tony Scott's debut film, courtesy of the BFI Production Board. It's gothic in its theme, as an isolated middle-aged brother and sister hoard the corpse of a cyclist they've accidentally killed on the road, but its understated playing and watchful camerawork are anything but. Treacle-slow storytelling and minimal dialogue allow Scott to ratchet up the narrative tension (there's a nifty feint at one point) as the camera roams around Rosamund Greenwood's wispily macabre sister as she gives out halting tales of loss, scrapbooking and strong tea. Chris Menges' pearly black-and-white cinematography adds immeasurably to the mood, tracking a miner's headlamp from a soot-black mine, or the windy swoop of a wheelbarrow down a Dales hillside, making the landscape as eloquent as the characters are taciturn."

DVD Beaver noted "a slow, meditative film that showcases Scott's ability to quietly and simply tell a story that is macabre, unsettling, and strangely sweet. To be sure, this is a very good film, and after finishing it, I couldn't help but wonder what else Scott might have in him. Even those who find themselves turned off by his post The Hunger oeuvre should find themselves pleasantly surprised by this truly wonderful film."
