= Peter Vaughan =

English actor (1923–2016)

- Born: Peter Ewart Ohm; 4 April 1923; Wem, Shropshire, England
- Died: 6 December 2016 (aged 93); Surrey, England
- Education: Uttoxeter Grammar School
- Occupation: Actor
- Years active: 1939–2015
- Spouses: Billie Whitelaw (m. 1952; div. 1966): Lillias Walker

Peter Ewart Ohm (4 April 1923 – 6 December 2016), known professionally as Peter Vaughan, was an English actor known for many supporting roles in British film and television productions. He also acted extensively on stage.

Vaughan played Genial Harry Grout (Grouty) in the sitcom Porridge and its 1979 film adaptation. His other roles included a recurring role with Robert Lindsay in the sitcom Citizen Smith, Tom Hedden in Straw Dogs, Winston the Ogre in Time Bandits, Tom Franklin in Chancer, and Mr. Stevens Sr. in The Remains of the Day. His final role was as Maester Aemon in HBO's Game of Thrones (2011–2015).

== Early life ==
Vaughan was born Peter Ewart Ohm on 4 April 1923 in Wem, Shropshire, the son of a bank clerk, Max Ohm, who was an Austrian immigrant, and Eva Wright, a nurse. The family later moved to Wellington, Shropshire, where he began his schooling. Vaughan said that while reciting a poem at infant school in Wellington he first experienced the applause and admiration coming from a good performance. From the age of seven, he lived in Staffordshire, where he attended Uttoxeter Grammar School. After leaving school, Vaughan joined the Wolverhampton Repertory Theatre in 1939, and gained experience in other repertory theatres as well. He adopted the stage name Peter Vaughan, though he never changed his name legally.

During service in the British Army during the Second World War, he was commissioned a second lieutenant in the Royal Corps of Signals on 9 June 1943, and served in Normandy, Belgium, and the Far East. At the end of the war, Vaughan was in Singapore during the liberation of Changi Prison.

== Career ==
Vaughan made his film debut in 1959 in an uncredited role as a police officer in The 39 Steps. He continued for several years to play small parts, including more cameos as policemen in Village of the Damned and The Victors, before gaining his first starring role, in a minor picture called Smokescreen (1964), where he played an insurance assessor investigating a businessman's disappearance in one of the last, and best, of the old-style British B-movies. In 1967, he received second billing opposite Frank Sinatra in the film The Naked Runner. His performance was not well received by one critic who accused him of overacting in his role as a British agent. He played Mr. Freeman in Karel Reisz's 1980 The French Lieutenant's Woman, alongside Meryl Streep and Jeremy Irons.

Possibly Vaughan's highest-profile film performance was as the father of Anthony Hopkins's character in The Remains of the Day (1993). He was also cast in Terry Gilliam's The Man Who Killed Don Quixote but had not shot any material before that project was abandoned. He had previously appeared for Gilliam in Time Bandits and Brazil. Vaughan appeared as a menacing character in Straw Dogs (1971), and with Bill Murray in a film of W. Somerset Maugham's novel The Razor's Edge in 1984. In 1996, he appeared as Giles Corey in The Crucible, and in 1997, he appeared alongside Robert Carlyle and Ray Winstone in Face. In 1998, Vaughan played Bishop Myriel in Les Misérables, alongside Liam Neeson. His most unusual role may have been as SS Obergruppenführer Arthur Nebe in the 1994 film of Robert Harris's novel Fatherland.

He appeared in the music video for Kate Bush's song "Experiment IV".

=== Television ===
Vaughan became known for his performances on television, including supporting roles in Porridge (as "Genial" Harry Grout) and Citizen Smith as Charles Johnson (his role in the latter series was taken over by Tony Steedman). His role in Porridge brought him a great deal of public recognition despite his character appearing in only three episodes and in the 1979 film of the series. In 1975, he appeared as Tony Kirby in an episode of the hard-hitting police drama The Sweeney entitled Stay Lucky, Eh?

He also appeared as "The Fence" in the well known humorous advert for McVities Fruit Shortcake biscuits along with Harry Fowler.

In 1969, Vaughan appeared in Randall and Hopkirk in the episode "Never Trust a Ghost". In the same year, he starred as Det. Chief Supt Cradock in the thirteen-part London Weekend Television TV series The Gold Robbers. In December 1972, he appeared as Mr. Paxton in the BBC television adaptation of the M. R. James ghost story in A Warning to the Curious, shown as part of their annual series A Ghost Story for Christmas.' In September 1973, he appeared as Quinn in the London Weekend Television TV series The Protectors, in an episode called 'Quinn'.

Vaughan starred as Billy Fox in the Thames Television series Fox (1980). The saga was written by Trevor Preston, directed by Jim Goddard, and produced by Verity Lambert. Other Fox family members were played by Elizabeth Spriggs, Ray Winstone, Larry Lamb, and Bernard Hill. Historical roles Vaughan played include those of Russian foreign minister Alexander Izvolsky in the serial Fall of Eagles (1974), British politician Thomas Inskip in the mini-series Winston Churchill: The Wilderness Years (1981), the title role in A Last Visitor for Mr. Hugh Peter (1981), and German Nazi figures Kurt Zeitzler in the miniseries War and Remembrance (1988) and Hermann Göring in the Granada Television-PBS docu-drama Countdown to War (1989). He also appeared in many literary adaptations, such as Bleak House (BBC, 1985), in which he played the sinister lawyer Mr. Tulkinghorn, and Our Mutual Friend (BBC Two, 1998). Other television work includes the espionage thriller Codename: Kyril (1988), in a lead role as the head of the KGB.

In 1986, Vaughan appeared in the promotional video for Kate Bush's "Experiment IV" single. In 1991, he played John Turner in an episode of Granada Television's The Adventures of Sherlock Holmes titled '"The Boscombe Valley Mystery".

He also appeared in the BBC production of Alan Aykbourn's play 'Season's Greetings' which was broadcast at Christmas 1986 and repeated on BBC 2 some years later. He played the role of Uncle Harvey.

Vaughan later attained particular acclaim for his supporting role as the Alzheimer's sufferer Felix Hutchinson in Our Friends in the North (BBC Two, 1996), a role that garnered a Best Actor nomination at the 1997 British Academy Television Awards. He played the clockmaker George Graham in Longitude, the TV drama adaptation of Dava Sobel's eponymous non-fiction novel about the quest for a means to determine longitude at sea. In 2007, he starred in the television series Mobile, and as Uncle Alfie in the film Death at a Funeral. In 2011, Vaughan starred as Michael Dodd in the BBC courtroom drama Silk. His final role, between 2011 and 2015, was Maester Aemon in the HBO series Game of Thrones.

=== Radio ===
Vaughan was heard as Superintendent Kirk in the BBC dramatisation of Dorothy L. Sayers' Peter Wimsey novel Busman's Honeymoon, and as Denethor in the 1981 BBC Radio production of The Lord of the Rings. He played Charles Augustus Milverton in a 1993 BBC radio dramatization of the Sherlock Holmes eponymous short story.

=== Stage ===
Vaughan's first breakthrough role was in 1964 as Ed in Joe Orton's work Entertaining Mr Sloane performed at Wyndham's Theatre.

== Personal life and death ==
The first of Vaughan's two marriages was to Billie Whitelaw, whom he married in 1952 and divorced in 1966. His second wife was actress Lilias Walker, with whom he lived in the village of Mannings Heath, in West Sussex, until his death, having previously lived in Crawley. His stepdaughter is married to Gregor Fisher.

Vaughan was partially blind in his old age. On 6 December 2016, he died from natural causes in Surrey at the age of 93.

== Selected filmography ==
Vaughan appeared in the following films and television series:

=== Film ===
Year	Title	Role	Notes
1959	The 39 Steps	2nd Police Constable on Train	Uncredited
1959	Sapphire	Detective Whitehead	Uncredited
1960	Village of the Damned	P.C. Gobby	
1960	Make Mine Mink	Policeman in Car	Uncredited
1961	Two Living, One Dead	John Kester	
1961	The Court Martial of Major Keller	Purvey	
1962	I Thank a Fool	Police Inspector	
1962	The Devil's Agent	Chief of Hungarian Police	
1963	The Punch and Judy Man	Committee Man	
1963	The Victors	Policeman	
1964	Smokescreen	Roper	
1965	Fanatic	Harry	
1965	Rotten to the Core	Sir Henry Capell	
1967	The Naked Runner	Martin Slattery	
1967	The Man Outside	Nikolai Volkov	
1968	The Bofors Gun	Sgt. Walker	
1968	Hammerhead	Hammerhead	
1968	A Twist of Sand	Johann	
1969	Alfred the Great	Burrud	
1970	Taste of Excitement	Inspector Malling	
1970	Eyewitness	Paul Grazzini	
1971	Straw Dogs	Tom Hedden	
1972	The Pied Piper	Bishop	
1972	Savage Messiah	Museum Attendant	
1973	The Return	Steven Royds	
1973	The Blockhouse	Aufret	
1973	The MacKintosh Man	Brunskill	
1973	Malachi's Cove	Mr. Gunliffe	
1973	Massacre in Rome	Gen. Albert Kesselring	
1974	Symptoms	Brady	
1974	11 Harrowhouse	Coglin	
1975	Intimate Reflections	Salesman	
1977	Valentino	Rory O'Neil	
1979	Zulu Dawn	Q. S. M. Bloomfield	
1979	Porridge	Harry Grout	
1981	Time Bandits	Winston the Ogre	
1981	The French Lieutenant's Woman	Mr. Freeman	
1984	The Razor's Edge	Mackenzie	
1984	Forbidden	Major Stauffel	
1985	Brazil	Mr. Helpmann	
1986	Haunted Honeymoon	Francis Abbot Sr.	
1987	Coast to Coast	The Chiropodist	
1989	Countdown to War	Hermann Göring	
1990	Mountains of the Moon	Lord Houghton	
1990	King of the Wind	Captain	
1993	The Remains of the Day	William Stevens	
1996	The Secret Agent	The Driver	
1996	The Crucible	Giles Corey	
1997	Face	Sonny	
1998	Les misérables	The Bishop	
1998	The Legend of 1900	'Pops', the Shopkeeper	
1998	The Good Son	Mick Doyle	Short
1999	An Ideal Husband	Phipps	
2000	Canone inverso – Making Love	Old Baron Blau	
2000	Hotel Splendide	Morton Blanche	
2001	Kiss Kiss (Bang Bang)	Daddy Zoo	
2003	The Mother	Toots	
2004	The Life and Death of Peter Sellers	Bill Sellers	
2004	The Queen of Sheba's Pearls	Edward Pretty	
2006	Care	Archie	Short
2007	Death at a Funeral	Uncle Alfie	
2008	Is Anybody There?	Bob	
2011	Albatross	Grandpa	

=== Television ===
Year	Title	Role	Notes
1960–1961	Deadline Midnight	Joe Dunn	10 episodes
1962	Oliver Twist	Bill Sikes	10 episodes
1963	Hancock	DS Hubbard	Episode: "The Eye Witness"
1964	The Saint	Walter Devan	Episode: "The Saint Steps In"
1966	Public Eye	F.X. Fowler	Episode: "What's the Matter? Can't You Take a Sick Joke?"
1966	Adam Adamant Lives!	Dr. Mort	Episode: "The Doomsday Plan"
1966	The Informer	David Janner	2 episodes
1967	Great Expectations	Mr. Jaggers	7 episodes
1967	Man in a Suitcase	Felix de Bugh	Episode: "Essay in Evil"
1968	The Avengers	Jaeger	Episode: "My Wildest Dream"
1968	The Expert	Richard Holler	Episode: "The Long Hate"
1968	Treasure Island	Long John Silver	9 episodes
1969	The Gold Robbers	Det. Chief Supt Cradock	13 episodes
1969	Randall and Hopkirk (Deceased)	James Howarth	Episode: "Never Trust a Ghost"
1969	Strange Report	Morrison	Episode: "A Most Curious Crime"
1971	The Rivals of Sherlock Holmes	Horace Dorrington	2 episodes
1971	The Persuaders!	Lance Schubert	Episode: "Chain of Events"
1972	A Ghost Story For Christmas	Mr. Paxton	Story: "A Warning to the Curious"
1973	The Adventurer	Roberts	Episode: "Somebody Doesn't Like Me"
1973	The Protectors	Quinn	Episode: "Quinn"
1973	Thriller	Anderson	Story: "The Eyes Have It"
1974	Fall of Eagles	Izvolsky	Episode: "Dress Rehearsal"
1974	The Pallisers	Mr. Chaffanbrass	2 episodes
1975	The Squirrels	Hawke	Episode: "The Fiddle"
1975	The Sweeney	Tony Kirby	Episode: "Stay Lucky, Eh!?"
1975–1977	Porridge	Harry Grout	3 episodes
1977–1979	Citizen Smith	Charlie Johnson	14 episodes
1978	The Doombolt Chase	Captain Hatfield	6 episodes
1979	The Danedyke Mystery	Det. Insp. Burroughs	5 episodes
1980	Fox	Billy Fox	7 episodes
1981	Shelley	Sgt. Brunton	Episode: "Nor Iron Bars a Cage"
1981	BBC2 Playhouse	Mr. Hugh Peter	Story: "A Last Visitor for Mr. Hugh Peter"
1981	Winston Churchill: The Wilderness Years	Sir Thomas Inskip	2 episodes
1982	Coming Out of the Ice	Belov	TV movie
1985	Bleak House	Tulkinghorn	5 episodes
1985	C.A.T.S. Eyes	Woodbridge	Episode: "Cross My Palm with Silver"
1986	Sins	Chief Prosecutor	3 episodes
1986	Monte Carlo	Pabst	2 episodes
1988	Codename: Kyril	Stanov	4 episodes
1988	The Bourne Identity	Fritz Koenig	2 episodes (mini-series)
1989	War and Remembrance	Col. Gen. Kurt Zeitzler	3 episodes (mini-series)
1990–1991	Chancer	Thomas 'Tom' Franklyn	17 episodes
1991	The Case-Book of Sherlock Holmes	John Turner	Episode: "The Boscombe Valley Mystery"
1991	Prisoner of Honor	General Mercier	TV movie
1991	Boon	Ray Beckett	Episode: "The Night Before Christmas"
1992	Lovejoy	Marek	Episode: "The Prague Sun"
1993	Nightingales	The Inspector	Episode: "All at Sea"
1994	Rab C. Nesbitt	Brother Adam	Episode: "Buckfast"
1994	Dandelion Dead	Doctor Hinks	4 episodes (mini-series)
1994	Fatherland	Arthur Nebe	TV movie
1994	Birds of a Feather	Monty	Episode: "Still Waters Run Deep"
1994	Murder Most Horrid	Doverson	Story: "Overkill"
1995	Oliver's Travels	Delaney	2 episodes
1996	Our Friends in the North	Felix Hutchinson	8 episodes
1997	The Moonstone	Gabriel Betterege	TV movie
1998	Our Mutual Friend	Mr. Boffin	4 episodes (mini-series)
1999	Horatio Hornblower: The Wrong War	Admiral Lord Hood	TV movie
2000	The 10th Kingdom	Wilfred Peep	4 episodes (mini-series)
2000	Longitude	George Graham	2 episodes (mini-series)
2000	The Thing About Vince...	Ray Skinner	3 episodes (mini-series)
2000	Second Sight	Harold King	Episode: "Kingdom of the Blind"
2000	Lorna Doone	Sir Esnor Doone	3 episodes (mini-series)
2002	Heartbeat	Arthur Wainwright	Episode: "From Ancient Grudge"
2002	In Deep	Clayton Waddington	2 episodes
2002	The Jury	Michael Colchester	6 episodes
2003	Casualty	Henry Lambert	Episode: "Friend or Foe"
2003	Sweet Medicine	Laurence Barber	1 episode
2003	Thursday the 12th	Edgar Bannister	TV movie
2003	Margery & Gladys	Troy Gladwell	TV movie
2003	Life Beyond the Box: Norman Stanley Fletcher	Harry Grout	TV movie
2004	Beauty	Mr. Robbins	TV movie
2005	Malice Aforethought	Widdicombe	TV movie
2005	Heartbeat	Mr. Andrews	Episode: "The End of the Road"
2007	Mobile	Grandad Stoan	3 episodes
2007	Christmas at the Riviera	Glen	TV movie
2008	Lark Rise to Candleford	Reverend Ellison	2 episodes
2008	HolbyBlue	Clarence	1 episode
2009	The Antiques Rogue Show	George Greenhalgh	TV movie
2011	Doc Martin	William Newcross	Episode: "Born with a Shotgun"
2011	Silk	Michael Dodd	Episode: "The Bitter End"
2011–2015	Game of Thrones	Maester Aemon	11 episodes; recurring (final role)
