= Rosamund Greenwood =

British actress (1907–1997)

- in Village of the Damned (1960)
- Born: Rosamund Mary Greenwood; 12 June 1907; Leeds, West Riding of Yorkshire, England
- Died: 15 July 1997 (aged 90); Malvern, Worcestershire, England
- Education: Royal Central School of Speech and Drama
- Spouse: Leo Von Pokorny (1934–1951)
- Children: 1

Rosamund Mary Von Pokorny (12 June 1907 – 15 July 1997) better known as Rosamund Greenwood, was a British actress who was active on screen from 1935 until 1990.

== Biography ==
After training at London's Central School, she was on stage from the late 1920s. Her theatre work included starring in the original West End and Broadway productions of Thornton Wilder's The Matchmaker from 1954 until 1957.

In a career spanning 60 years, Greenwood's screen work included The Prince and the Showgirl, Night of the Demon, Upstairs, Downstairs, All Creatures Great and Small, Angels, Crown Court and A Perfect Spy, and Hallelujah! in 1983. Her final role came in 1990, when aged 83, she played a witch in the screen adaptation of Roald Dahl's novel The Witches.

== Personal life and death ==
Greenwood married the actor Leo Von Pokorny in 1934. The marriage produced one child, a son, who was born in 1935. Von Pokorny died in 1951, aged 58.

Greenwood died on 15 July 1997, aged 90, in Malvern, Worcestershire.

== Filmography ==
Year	Title	Role	Notes
1935	School for Stars		Uncredited
1936	Men Are Not Gods	Pianist	Uncredited
1940	Room for Two		Uncredited
1942	Penn of Pennsylvania		Uncredited
1943	The Peterville Diamond	Miss Geach	
1944	Heaven Is Round the Corner	Maid	
1944	Give Us the Moon		Uncredited
1957	The Prince and the Showgirl	Maud	
1957	Night of the Demon	Mrs Meek	
1958	A Night to Remember	Mrs Bull	Uncredited
1959	Idol on Parade	Spinster	
1960	Village of the Damned	Miss Ogle	
1962	Term of Trial	Constance	
1965	The Murder Game	Mrs Potter	
1965	Strangler's Web	Miss Pitts	
1971	A Severed Head	Miss Seelhaft	
1971	Loving Memory	Sister	
1976	The Bawdy Adventures of Tom Jones	Village Gossip	Uncredited
1977	Stand Up, Virgin Soldiers	Miss Plant	
1982	The Missionary	Lady Fermleigh	
1983	Hallelujah! (TV series)	Sister Dorothy Smith	
1984	Secret Places	Hannah	
1990	The Witches	Janice	Final film role
