= Robert Trotter =

Scottish actor and director

- Born: 7 March 1930; Dumbarton, Scotland, UK
- Died: 12 August 2013 (aged 83)
- Occupations: Actor, director, and photographer
- Known for: Take the High Road

Robert Trotter (7 March 1930 – 12 August 2013) was a Scottish actor, director, and photographer.

== Biography ==
Robert Trotter was born in Dumbarton, Scotland, on 7 March 1930. After completing national service in the 1950s, he became an English teacher at Bellahouston Academy in Glasgow. Following his departure from the academy, he was a lecturer in drama at Glasgow University from 1964 to 1971.

Trotter played an active role in the Scottish arts in the 1960s, working on stage, radio, and television. His work reached a worldwide audience when he joined the cast of the long-running TV drama Take the High Road in 1982.

In the 1990s, he started to pursue his lifelong interest in photography. In 2001, he published a collection of photographs from Glasgow and New York called Sing the City. The archive at Glasgow School of Art contains 300 of his photos, where they are currently on display to the public.

== Theatre ==
Royal Court Theatre Upstairs, London

- Bright Scene Fading - Tom Gallacher

King's Head Theatre Club, London

- Recital - Tom Gallacher

Traverse Theatre, Edinburgh

- The Gay Gorbals - Hector MacMillan
- Every Good Boy Deserves Favour - Tom Stoppard

Pitlochry Festival Theatre

- A Midsummer Night's Dream - Shakespeare
- Hobson's Choice - Harold Brighouse
- Babes in the Wood - James Bridie

Dundee Repertory Company

- The Deep Blue Sea - Rattigan
- The Winslow Boy - Rattigan
- Getting On - Alan Bennett
- Travesties - Tom Stoppard
- A Delicate Balance - Edward Albee
- Wise Child - Simon Gray
- I Have Been Here Before - J. B. Priestley
- The Boy Friend - Sandy Wilson

Perth Repertory Theatre

- What Every Woman Knows - J. M. Barrie
- The Odd Couple - Neil Simon
- The Government Inspector - Gogol
- She Stoops to Conquer - Goldsmith

Bedlam Theatre

- The Jungle Book - Kipling / Stephen MacDonald

Theatremakers, Stirling

- Waiting for Godot - Samuel Beckett

Stage Company (Scotland)

- The Fall of Kelvin Walker - Alasdair Gray

Arts Theatre, Glasgow University - 1965–1972

- The Restoration of Arnold McMillan - David Storey
- The Changeling - Middleton & Rowley
- The Forrigan Reel - James Bridie
- The Man of Mode - Etherege
- The Entertainer - Osborne
- Entertaining Mr Sloane - Orton
- The Cocktail Party - Eliot
- The Shadow of a Gunman - O'Casey
- Play with a Tiger - Doris Lessing
- Uncle Vanya - Chekhov

Selected plays directed

- Scottish Theatre Company - The Man of the World - (Macklin)
- Pitlochry Festival Theatre - Translations - (Brian Friel), Deadline - (David Huthison)
- Dundee Repertory Theatre - Gigi - (Colette/Loos), Too true to be Good - (Shaw), The Father - (Strindberg), Last of the Red Hot Lovers - (Neil Simon), Sleuth - (Schaffer)
- Tron Theatre, Glasgow - Josef and Maria - (Peter Turrini)
- Arts Theatre, Glasgow University - Tango- (Mrozek), Shelley - (Ann Jellicoe), Macbeth and New Plays by Eric MacDonald and Joan Ure

== Selected filmography ==
- Clay, Smeddum and Greenden (BBC) - (dir. Moira Armstrong)
- Annals of the Parish (BBC) - (dir. Tom Cotter)
- The Chiel Amang Us (BBC) - (dir. Tom Cotter & Gordon Menzies)
- The Haggard Falcon (BBC) - (dir. Mike Vardy)
- The Omega Factor (BBC) - (dir. George Gallaccio)
- Burgh Life (BBC) - (dir. Tom Cotter)
- Badger by Owl Light (BBC) - (dir. Bob McIntosh)
- The Fetch Scottish Television - (dir. Iain Dalgleish)
- City Sugar (STV) - (dir. Mike Vardy)
- Take the High Road (STV) (1982–1995)

== Selected radio ==
- The Doctor's Dilemma - (Shaw) - dir. John Tydeman
- The Knocker - (Alan Melville) - dir. John Tydeman
- The Idiot - (Doestoevsky) - dir. Kay Patrick
- The Beautiful Garden - dir. Jane Morgan
- Peer Gynt - (Ibsen) dir. Jane Morgan
- For the Whale - dir. John Theocharis
- Nunaga - dir. John Theocharis
- Tusitala and Swift Cloud - dir. Christopher Venning
- Hatter's Castle (Cronin) - dir. Stewart Conn
- They've taken the Swings Away (Eric MacDonald)- dir. Stewart Conn
- Putting it Right - (Eric MacDonald) - dir. Stewart Conn
- Annie S. Swan, The People's Friend - dir. Marilyn Imrie
- The Bride of Lammermoor - (Scott) - dir. Marilyn Imrie
- Strathinver - (Robin Bell) - dir. John Arnott - Winner of Sony Award 1985
- The Bell in the Tree - (Story of Glasgow) - dir. Hamish Wilson
- The Horror at Bly - (as Henry James) - dir. Maurice Leitch
- Eden Scenes on Chrystal Jed - (as Robert Burns) - dir. Alec Reid
- Deacon Brodie - dir. Hamish Wilson
- Audio Books - Scottish and English Classics published by Schiltron and Canongate Books

== Photography ==
Sing the City, published in 2001, is a collection of Trotter's photographs. They were taken in Glasgow and New York City between 1995 and 1999 and depict the people of both cities. This publication resulted in an exhibition at the Glasgow School of Art in 2004. and the acquisition of much of his work by them and the Scottish National Photography Collection held within the Scottish National Portrait Gallery in Edinburgh.

- Trotter, Robert (2001). Sing the City. ISBN 978-0954093006.
