= 'Oh, Whistle, and I'll Come to You, My Lad' =

1904 ghost story by M.R. James

- Short story by M. R. James
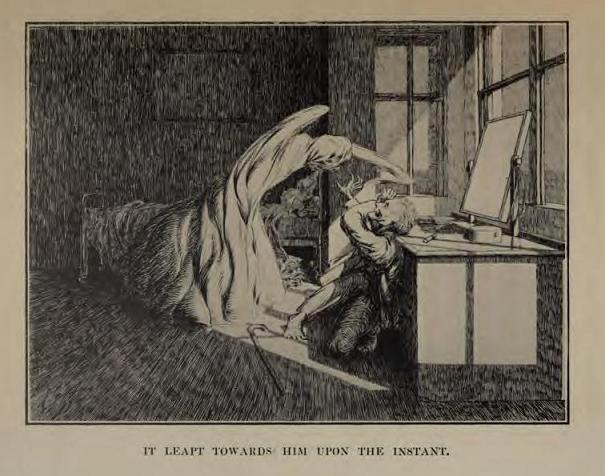
- "It leapt towards him upon the instant". An illustration by M. R. James' friend James McBryde, from the first edition of Ghost Stories of an Antiquary.

Text available at Wikisource
- Country: United Kingdom
- Language: English
- Genre: Horror

Publication
- Published in: Ghost Stories of an Antiquary
- Publication type: Anthology
- Publisher: Edward Arnold
- Media type: Print (hardback)
- Publication date: 1904

"'Oh, Whistle, and I'll Come to You, My Lad'" is a ghost story by British writer M. R. James, first published in his short story collection Ghost Stories of an Antiquary (1904). The title comes from a 1793 poem by Robert Burns.

== Plot ==
Parkins, the protagonist, is a young "Professor of Ontography" at the University of Cambridge, who when the story opens is about to embark on a golfing holiday at the town of Burnstow on the east coast of England. (Note: Burnstow is a fictionalised version of Felixstowe, Suffolk.) He has secured a room at the Globe Inn for the duration of his stay, though he is somewhat uncomfortable that the room will contain a second bed. At dinner in his College, an archaeological colleague asks him to investigate the grounds of a ruined Knights Templar preceptory near the Globe, with a view to its suitability for a dig.

On his first day at Burnstow, after a round of golf with Colonel Wilson, another guest at the Globe, Parkins proceeds to find and examine the site of the preceptory. He happens upon a hole in the masonry, and finds an ancient bronze whistle, which he takes with him. As he returns to the Globe along the desolate beach, he notes that "the shape of a rather indistinct personage" in the distance appears to be making great efforts to catch up with him, but to no avail.

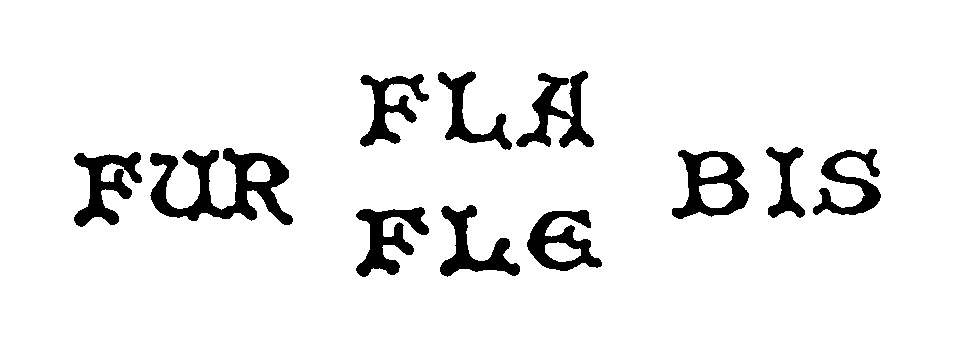
The ominous inscription upon the whistle, from a 1905 edition of the story

After an evening meal at the inn, Parkins inspects the whistle while alone in his room. First clearing the hard-packed soil from the item onto a sheet of paper, he then empties the soil out of the window, observing what he believes to be a sole individual "stationed on the shore, facing the inn". Parkins then holds the whistle close to a candle, discovering two inscriptions on the item. On one side appears:

FUR	FLA; FLE	BIS

of which Parkins, his Latin "rusty", is unable to make anything. (Note: This inscription is never explained in the story, but it also seems to be Latin. Read as "Fūr: flābis, flēbis", the inscription roughly translates thus: "Thief: [if] you shall blow, you shall weep".) The inscription on the other side reads "QUIS EST ISTE QUI UENIT", a Latin phrase which Parkins translates as "Who is this who is coming?" (Note: This may be a Biblical reference to the Latin version of Isaiah 63:1, "Quis est iste qui venit de Edom...".) Upon blowing the whistle, which emits a note with "a quality of infinite distance", Parkins notices a sudden surge of wind outside his window, and has a vision of a "wide, dark expanse at night with a fresh wind blowing", in the middle of which he sees a solitary figure.

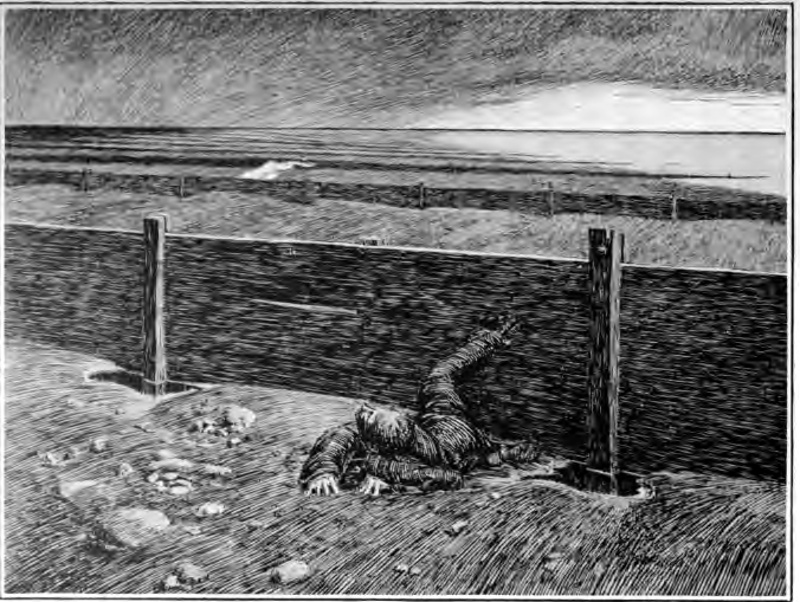
"Looking up in an attitude of painful anxiety". An illustration of the nightmare sequence of Parkins fleeing an apparition along the beach in the hours after he blew the bronze whistle by M. R. James' friend James McBryde, from the first edition of Ghost Stories of an Antiquary.

Unable to sleep that night, Parkins experiences visions of a man desperately running and clambering over high groynes, while anxiously looking back. After the man collapses to the ground in exhaustion, Parkins sees the cause of his flight, "a figure in pale, fluttering draperies, ill-defined", moving in a strange manner and with incredible speed. Realising he is unable to dispel the visions, Parkins decides to read through the night, although when he attempts to light a match, he hears the sound of scurrying on his floor in the direction away from his bed, which he believes may be the sound of rats fleeing. Parkins then reads himself to a sound sleep, with the candle beside his bed still burning when he is awakened the following morning.

As he prepares to leave the inn, Parkins is informed by a maid that both beds in his room appeared to have been slept in. The maid had already made both beds, explaining the sheets on the bed he had not slept in were "crumpled and thrown about all ways". Parkins supposes he must have disturbed the sheets while unpacking. He then leaves the inn to play golf, again with Colonel Wilson whom he tells about the whistle. The Colonel, who has "pronouncedly protestant views", says that he would "be careful about using a thing that had belonged to a set of Papists".

Returning to the inn, Parkins and Wilson encounter a terrified boy running from it, who explains he has just seen a strange, white figure waving at him from the window of one of the rooms. Parkins realises from the boy's description that the room must be his own. Investigating, they find the room still locked, but find that the sheets on the unused bed are again twisted and contorted.

That night, Parkins is awakened from sleep by the collapse of an improvised partition that he had constructed to block the moonlight. He sees a figure sitting on the unused bed, which causes him to jump from his own bed in the direction of the window, to retrieve his cane. As he does so, the "personage in the empty bed" moves into a position in front of the door, with arms outspread. This apparition remains stationary in the shadows for several moments as Parkins's fear escalates. It then gropes blindly about the room in a stooping posture, darting towards Parkins's bed, and feeling about the pillow and sheets for his body. Realising he is no longer in the bed, the apparition moves into the moonlit part of the room; Parkins's impression is of "a horrible, an intensely horrible, face of crumpled linen".

Parkins lets out a cry of disgust, revealing his general location by the window. The figure moves rapidly at him, and he is backed half-way through the window, screaming, as its face is "thrust close into his own". Arriving just in time, Colonel Wilson forces the door to his room open; before he reaches the window, the apparition tumbles to the floor, a heap of bed-clothes, while Parkins collapses in a faint. The following day, the linen from the room is burned and the Colonel throws the whistle into the sea.

== Publication ==
"'Oh, Whistle, and I'll Come to You, My Lad'" was written in 1903. In December 1903, James read the story at the King's College, Cambridge Christmas gathering in 1903. The story was first published in James' book Ghost Stories of an Antiquary in 1904. In 1931, it was collected in James' book The Collected Ghost Stories of M. R. James. It has since been collected many times, including in My Favorite Fantasy Story in 2000.

Its title derives from the 1793 poem by Robert Burns, "Oh, whistle and I'll come to you, my lad". S. T. Joshi suggests the ghost in the story was inspired by a dream that James had. In 2010, Robert Lloyd Parry opined that the story was partially inspired by James' visits to his friend Felix Cobbold in Felixstowe, where on one occasion another guest, JK Stephen, suffered a head injury in a riding accident that was reportedly caused by the horse being startled by a whistle or gust of wind.

== Reception ==
Daniel Frampton offers "'Oh, Whistle, and I'll Come to You, My Lad'" as an example of stories by James that "exhibit a supernaturally-charged reality that was 'terrifyingly alive'.", writing "[James'] ghosts are novel in that they are 'embodied terrors' that can be touched."

S. T. Joshi writes that "'Oh, Whistle, and I'll Come to You, My Lad'" "...contains perhaps the most distinctive 'ghost' in [James'] corpus, which may have derived from a dream."

== Adaptations ==
In 1949, "'Oh, Whistle, and I'll Come to You, My Lad'" became the second installment of the new Man in Black series, arranged for radio by John Keir Cross. George Owen played Professor Parkins, Charles Lefeaux played Colonel Wilson, and Valentine Dyall starred as the eponymous host. The 30-minute play was transmitted on 7 February on the BBC Light Programme and repeated on the Home Service on 6 April.

On 24 December 1963, a radio adaptation of "'Oh, Whistle, and I'll Come to You, My Lad'" produced by Charles Lefeaux and adapted by Michael and Mollie Hardwick was broadcast on the BBC Home Service. The production is notable for the casting of Michael Hordern as Parkins – a role he would reprise for Jonathan Miller's TV adaptation five years later. The Radio Times teaser read "Easy enough to whistle – but there's no telling what will answer." The 30-minute play was repeated on BBC Radio 4 Extra on 1 January 2018.

On 7 May 1968, the BBC produced a film adaptation directed by Jonathan Miller and starring Michael Hordern as Professor Parkin.

On 27 December 1977, Michell Raper presented a 30-minute talk entitled The Ghosts of M. R. James, which featured a reading from "'Oh, Whistle, and I'll Come to You, My Lad'".

On 19 December 1980, "'Oh, Whistle, and I'll Come to You, My Lad'" became Radio 4's Book at Bedtime. It was read in a 15-minute slot by Robert Trotter.

In December 1986, BBC2 broadcast a partially dramatized reading by the actor Robert Powell of "'Oh, Whistle, and I'll Come to You, My Lad'".

In 2007, Nunkie Theatre Company toured Oh, Whistle ... round the UK and Ireland. This one-man show was a retelling of two of James's tales, "'Oh, Whistle, and I'll Come to You, My Lad'" and "The Ash-tree".

In December 2007, BBC Radio 4 presented an adaptation of "'Oh, Whistle, and I'll Come to You, My Lad'" in its Woman's Hour Drama slot starring Jamie Glover as Professor Parkins.

In 2010, the BBC again adapted the story, this time directed by Andy De Emmony and starring John Hurt and Sophie Thompson.

In summer 2011, the Crusade Theatre Company toured a new stage adaptation of "'Oh, Whistle, and I'll Come to You, My Lad'" in England.

On 31 October 2014, the BBC daytime soap opera Doctors presented an adaptation of "'Oh, Whistle, and I'll Come to You, My Lad'" with Dr. Al Haskey (played by Ian Midlane) substituted for Professor Parkins. It was written by Jeremy Hylton Davies and directed by Pip Short. The BBC website also produced a behind-the-scenes video of the production.

In 2019, a professor in the Father Brown episode “The Whistle in the Dark” reads the story to his grandchildren and later mentions it to guests before auctioning a medieval whistle he claims can summon spirits.

In 2020, a full cast, audio adaptation of "'Oh, Whistle, and I'll Come to You, My Lad'" was produced under the title "Whistle" by White Heron Theatre of Nantucket, Massachusetts. It was written and directed by Mark Shanahan, with original audio production and music by John Gromada. The audio drama bears a contemporary setting and was set on Nantucket Island. Though it deviates from the source material in many aspects, it retains the original's core traits. The cast includes Steve Pacek Alexandra Kopko and Catherine Shanahan. The audio drama was broadcast on Nantucket's NPR affiliate station, WNCK, on 31 October 2020.
