= Roy Evans (actor) =

English retired actor (born 1929 or 1930)

- Born: 1929 or 1930 (age 96–97); Fishponds, Bristol, Gloucestershire, England
- Occupation: Actor
- Years active: 1948–2004
- Television: Doctor Who; Only Fools and Horses; Blake's 7
- Spouse: Annette Burnhill (m. 1958; died 2011)
- Children: At least 1

Roy Evans (born 1929 or 1930) is an English retired actor and former ballet dancer. He appeared in a wide range of productions including Doctor Who (The Daleks' Master Plan as Trantis, The Green Death as Bert and The Monster of Peladon as a miner), Blake's 7 ("Redemption" as a Slave), Porterhouse Blue (as Arthur), Only Fools and Horses (The Jolly Boys' Outing as Harry the coach driver), as well as peasant roles in The Black Adder.

== Early life ==
Born in Fishponds, he was adopted by Edmund Evans and Clarice Augusta Georgina May Evans (née Gowen). As a teenager, Evans went to London to become a dancer and actor.

== Career ==
His dancing work includes visiting the Nottingham Theatre Royal with the International Ballet Company in 1951, gaining a long run in A Girl Called Jo at Piccadilly Theatre followed by a six-month engagement as principal male ballet dancer with the Swedish national ballet company.

In film he is particularly known for roles in The Fearless Vampire Killers (1967), Oliver! (1968), Decline and Fall... of a Birdwatcher (1968), Where's Jack? (1969), Loving Memory (1971), Dark Places (1973), Jabberwocky (1977), The Prince and the Pauper (1977), Raise the Titanic (1980), The Elephant Man (1980) and The Company of Wolves (1984).

== Personal life ==
He married former actress Annette Burnhill in 1958 and had one child with her, a daughter named Georgina (born 1964). Annette died in 2011 aged 81 or 82.
