= Psalm 109 =

Psalm

- "Hold not thy peace, O God of my praise"
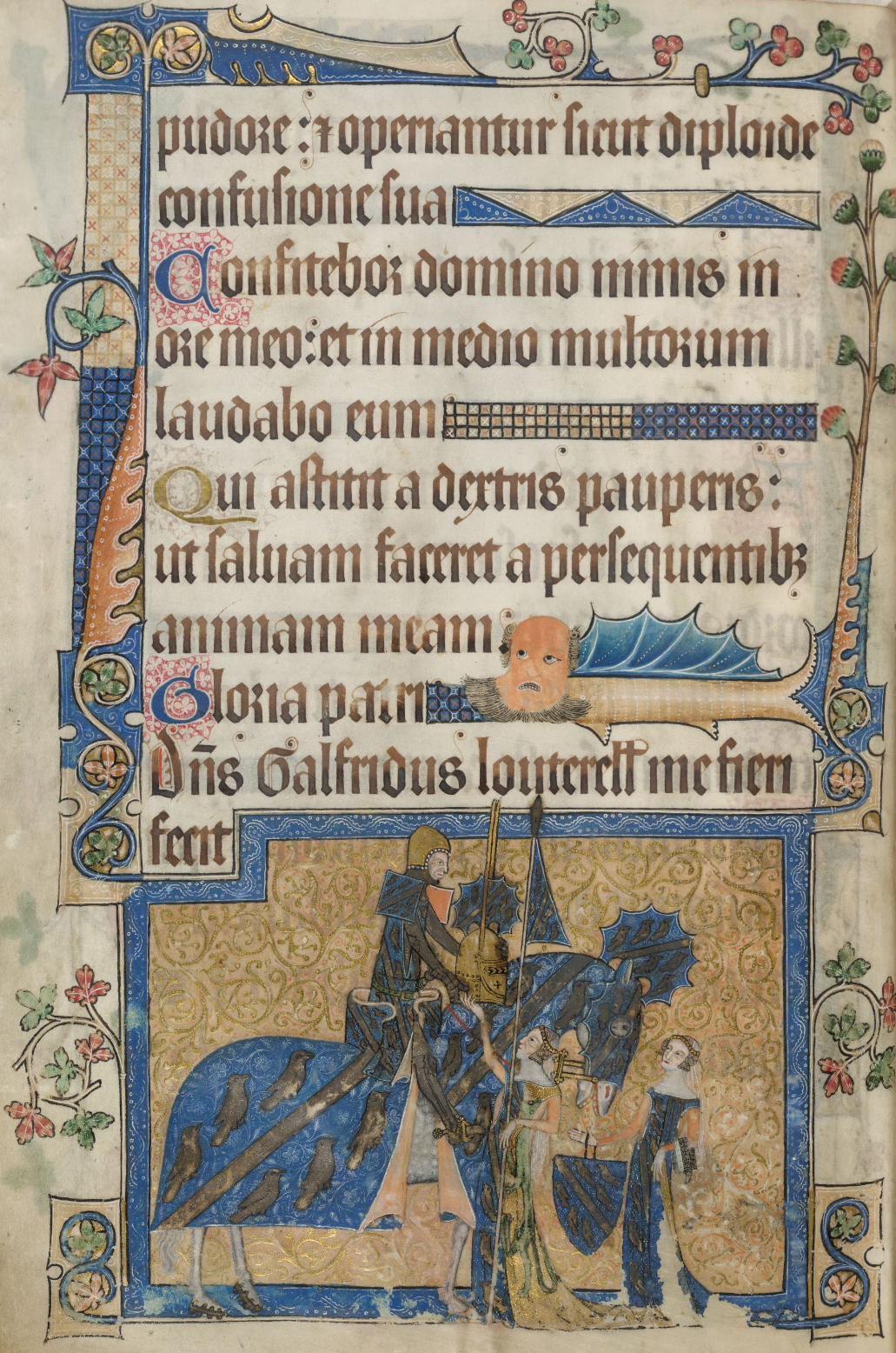
- Luttrell Psalter (1320–1340) showing Psaume (Psalm) 109
- Other name: Psalm 108; "Deus, laudem"
- Language: Hebrew (original)

Psalm 109
- ← Psalm 108 Psalm 110 →
- Book: Book of Psalms
- Hebrew Bible part: Ketuvim
- Order in the Hebrew part: 1
- Category: Sifrei Emet
- Christian Bible part: Old Testament
- Order in the Christian part: 19

Psalm 109 is a psalm in the Book of Psalms, beginning in English in the King James Version: "Hold not thy peace, O God of my praise". In the slightly different numbering system used in the Greek Septuagint version of the Bible and in the Latin Vulgate, this psalm is Psalm 108. In Latin, it is known as "Deus, laudem". It is attributed to King David and noted for containing some of the most severe curses in the Bible, such as verses 12 and 13. It has traditionally been called the "Judas Psalm" or "Iscariot Psalm" for an interpretation relating verse 8 to Judas Iscariot's punishment as noted in the New Testament.

The psalm forms a regular part of Jewish, Catholic, Lutheran, Anglican and other Protestant liturgies. It has been set to music.

== Uses ==
=== In Judaism ===
Psalm 109 is recited on the day of Parshat Zachor, (Hebrew: שבת זכור, 'Sabbath [of] remembrance'), the Shabbat immediately preceding Purim.

=== In political contexts ===
In the United States, verse 8, "May his days be few; may another take his place of leadership", has been used by a number of fundamentalist preachers who use the imprecatory psalm as an imprecatory prayer. Pastor Greg Dixon of the Indianapolis Baptist Temple had invoked it, which had been condemned by others. In 2009, the media reported more widely on its usage in reference to President Barack Obama, by those such as Pastor Wiley Drake. In January 2010, a Florida Sheriff's deputy was suspended for highlighting the passage in another deputy's bible and adding the note "The Obama Prayer" beside it. In January 2012, Kansas Speaker of the House Michael O'Neal sent an email quoting verse 8 to his Republican colleagues that stated, "At last – I can honestly voice a Biblical prayer for our president! Look it up – it is word for word! Let us all bow our heads and pray. Brothers and Sisters, can I get an AMEN? AMEN!!!!!!" On June 10, 2016, Georgia Senator David Perdue quoted the verse, referencing Obama, at the Faith and Freedom Coalition's Road to Majority conference.

By the late summer of 2017, bumper stickers could be seen asking people to pray for US President Donald Trump with the same attribution.

=== In modern literature ===
Psalm 109 was used by Thomas Hardy in his novel The Mayor of Casterbridge. Michael Henchard, the protagonist of the novel, is drinking with the choir after practice when he sees his rival, Donald Farfrae, whom he hates. He later persuades the choir to sing Psalm 109. The choir master remarks of this psalm that, "Twasn't made for singing. We chose it once when the gypsy stole the parson's mare, thinking to please him, but parson were quite upset. Whatever Servant David were thinking about when he made a Psalm that nobody can sing without disgracing himself, I can't fathom."

Verse 6 of the same psalm figures prominently in M. R. James's supernatural story "The Stalls of Barchester Cathedral" (1910), which recounts the guilt-ridden life and dismal death of Archdeacon John Haynes, who is haunted through the medium of wooden figures carved on the archdeacon's choir stall, which feel as though they come to life beneath his guilty hand (he having removed a stair rod in order to cause his predecessor to tumble down a flight of stairs to his death).

…the wood seemed to become chilly and soft as if made of wet linen. I can assign the moment at which I became sensible of this.The choir were singing the words (Set thou an ungodly man to be ruler over him and) let Satan stand at his right hand.

James also features Psalm 109 as a plot device (without, however, actually quoting from it) in "The Uncommon Prayer-Book", another of his ghost stories. The prayer-book of the title is discovered to have been had printed (during the Commonwealth period) by ardent royalist Lady Sadleir of Brockstone Court, who so detested Oliver Cromwell that she stipulated in a rubric in her prayer-book - most unconventionally - that Psalm 109 be read in her chapel each year on St. Mark’s Day, April the 25th - Cromwell’s birthday - in order to damn him for all eternity.

=== In Catholicism ===
After the excommunication of the whole Spanish town of Trasmoz in the late 13th century, and the refusal of the population to repent, the Church cursed the town with the chanting of Psalm 109 (Psalm 108 in the Vulgate) in 1511.

=== In Anglicanism ===
According to the 1662 Book of Common Prayer, Psalms 108 and 109 are said or sung at Evensong on the 22nd day of every month.

=== Musical settings ===
Heinrich Schütz composed a four-part setting to a metric German paraphrase of Psalm 109, Herr Gott, deß ich mich rühmte viel, SVW 207, for the 1628 Becker Psalter.

== Text ==
The following table shows the Hebrew text of the Psalm with vowels, alongside the Koine Greek text in the Septuagint and the English translation from the King James Version. Note that the meaning can slightly differ between these versions, as the Septuagint and the Masoretic Text come from different textual traditions. (Note: A 1917 translation directly from Hebrew to English by the Jewish Publication Society can be found here or here, and an 1844 translation directly from the Septuagint by L. C. L. Brenton can be found here. Both translations are in the public domain.) In the Septuagint, this psalm is numbered Psalm 108.

#	Hebrew	English	Greek
1	לַ֭מְנַצֵּחַ לְדָוִ֣ד מִזְמ֑וֹר אֱלֹהֵ֥י תְ֝הִלָּתִ֗י אַֽל־תֶּחֱרַֽשׁ׃	Hold not thy peace, O God of my praise;	Εἰς τὸ τέλος· ψαλμὸς τῷ Δαυΐδ. - Ο Θεός, τὴν αἴνεσίν μου μὴ παρασιωπήσῃς,
2	כִּ֤י פִ֪י רָשָׁ֡ע וּֽפִי־מִ֭רְמָה עָלַ֣י פָּתָ֑חוּ דִּבְּר֥וּ אִ֝תִּ֗י לְשׁ֣וֹן שָֽׁקֶר׃	For the mouth of the wicked and the mouth of the deceitful are opened against me: they have spoken against me with a lying tongue.	ὅτι στόμα ἁμαρτωλοῦ καὶ στόμα δολίου ἐπ᾿ ἐμὲ ἠνοίχθη, ἐλάλησαν κατ᾿ ἐμοῦ γλώσσῃ δολίᾳ
3	וְדִבְרֵ֣י שִׂנְאָ֣ה סְבָב֑וּנִי וַיִּֽלָּחֲמ֥וּנִי חִנָּֽם׃	They compassed me about also with words of hatred; and fought against me without a cause.	καὶ λόγοις μίσους ἐκύκλωσάν με καὶ ἐπολέμησάν με δωρεάν.
4	תַּֽחַת־אַהֲבָתִ֥י יִשְׂטְנ֗וּנִי וַאֲנִ֥י תְפִלָּֽה׃	For my love they are my adversaries: but I give myself unto prayer.	ἀντὶ τοῦ ἀγαπᾶν με ἐνδιέβαλλόν με, ἐγὼ δὲ προσηυχόμην·
5	וַיָּ֘שִׂ֤ימוּ עָלַ֣י רָ֭עָה תַּ֣חַת טוֹבָ֑ה וְ֝שִׂנְאָ֗ה תַּ֣חַת אַהֲבָתִֽי׃	And they have rewarded me evil for good, and hatred for my love.	καὶ ἔθεντο κατ᾿ ἐμοῦ κακὰ ἀντὶ ἀγαθῶν καὶ μῖσος ἀντὶ τῆς ἀγαπήσεώς μου.
6	הַפְקֵ֣ד עָלָ֣יו רָשָׁ֑ע וְ֝שָׂטָ֗ן יַעֲמֹ֥ד עַל־יְמִינֽוֹ׃	Set thou a wicked man over him: and let Satan stand at his right hand.	κατάστησον ἐπ᾿ αὐτὸν ἁμαρτωλόν, καὶ διάβολος στήτω ἐκ δεξιῶν αὐτοῦ·
7	בְּ֭הִשָּׁ֣פְטוֹ יֵצֵ֣א רָשָׁ֑ע וּ֝תְפִלָּת֗וֹ תִּֽהְיֶ֥ה לַחֲטָאָֽה׃	When he shall be judged, let him be condemned: and let his prayer become sin.	ἐν τῷ κρίνεσθαι αὐτὸν ἐξέλθοι καταδεδικασμένος, καὶ ἡ προσευχὴ αὐτοῦ γενέσθω εἰς ἁμαρτίαν.
8	יִֽהְיוּ־יָמָ֥יו מְעַטִּ֑ים פְּ֝קֻדָּת֗וֹ יִקַּ֥ח אַחֵֽר׃	Let his days be few; and let another take his office.	γενηθήτωσαν αἱ ἡμέραι αὐτοῦ ὀλίγαι, καὶ τὴν ἐπισκοπὴν αὐτοῦ λάβοι ἕτερος.
9	יִֽהְיוּ־בָנָ֥יו יְתוֹמִ֑ים וְ֝אִשְׁתּ֗וֹ אַלְמָנָֽה׃	Let his children be fatherless, and his wife a widow.	γενηθήτωσαν οἱ υἱοὶ αὐτοῦ ὀρφανοὶ καὶ ἡ γυνὴ αὐτοῦ χήρα·
10	וְנ֤וֹעַ יָנ֣וּעוּ בָנָ֣יו וְשִׁאֵ֑לוּ וְ֝דָרְשׁ֗וּ מֵחׇרְבֽוֹתֵיהֶֽם׃	Let his children be continually vagabonds, and beg: let them seek their bread also out of their desolate places.	σαλευόμενοι μεταναστήτωσαν οἱ υἱοὶ αὐτοῦ καὶ ἐπαιτησάτωσαν, ἐκβληθήτωσαν ἐκ τῶν οἰκοπέδων αὐτῶν.
11	יְנַקֵּ֣שׁ נ֭וֹשֶׁה לְכׇל־אֲשֶׁר־ל֑וֹ וְיָבֹ֖זּוּ זָרִ֣ים יְגִיעֽוֹ׃	Let the extortioner catch all that he hath; and let the strangers spoil his labour.	ἐξερευνησάτω δανειστὴς πάντα, ὅσα ὑπάρχει αὐτῷ, καὶ διαρπασάτωσαν ἀλλότριοι τοὺς πόνους αὐτοῦ·
12	אַל־יְהִי־ל֭וֹ מֹשֵׁ֣ךְ חָ֑סֶד וְֽאַל־יְהִ֥י ח֝וֹנֵ֗ן לִֽיתוֹמָֽיו׃	Let there be none to extend mercy unto him: neither let there be any to favour his fatherless children.	μὴ ὑπαρξάτω αὐτῷ ἀντιλήπτωρ, μηδὲ γενηθήτω οἰκτίρμων τοῖς ὀρφανοῖς αὐτοῦ·
13	יְהִֽי־אַחֲרִית֥וֹ לְהַכְרִ֑ית בְּד֥וֹר אַ֝חֵ֗ר יִמַּ֥ח שְׁמָֽם׃	Let his posterity be cut off; and in the generation following let their name be blotted out.	γενηθήτω τὰ τέκνα αὐτοῦ εἰς ἐξολόθρευσιν, ἐν γενεᾷ μιᾷ ἐξαλειφθείη τὸ ὄνομα αὐτοῦ.
14	יִזָּכֵ֤ר ׀ עֲוֺ֣ן אֲ֭בֹתָיו אֶל־יְהֹוָ֑ה וְחַטַּ֥את אִ֝מּ֗וֹ אַל־תִּמָּֽח׃	Let the iniquity of his fathers be remembered with the LORD; and let not the sin of his mother be blotted out.	ἀναμνησθείη ἡ ἀνομία τῶν πατέρων αὐτοῦ ἔναντι Κυρίου, καὶ ἡ ἁμαρτία τῆς μητρὸς αὐτοῦ μὴ ἐξαλειφθείη·
15	יִהְי֣וּ נֶגֶד־יְהֹוָ֣ה תָּמִ֑יד וְיַכְרֵ֖ת מֵאֶ֣רֶץ זִכְרָֽם׃	Let them be before the LORD continually, that he may cut off the memory of them from the earth.	γενηθήτωσαν ἐναντίον Κυρίου διαπαντός, καὶ ἐξολοθρευθείη ἐκ γῆς τὸ μνημόσυνον αὐτῶν,
16	יַ֗עַן אֲשֶׁ֤ר ׀ לֹ֥א זָכַר֮ עֲשׂ֢וֹת חָ֥֫סֶד וַיִּרְדֹּ֡ף אִישׁ־עָנִ֣י וְ֭אֶבְיוֹן וְנִכְאֵ֨ה לֵבָ֬ב לְמוֹתֵֽת׃	Because that he remembered not to shew mercy, but persecuted the poor and needy man, that he might even slay the broken in heart.	ἀνθ᾿ ὧν οὐκ ἐμνήσθη ποιῆσαι ἔλεος καὶ κατεδίωξεν ἄνθρωπον πένητα καὶ πτωχὸν καὶ κατανενυγμένον τῇ καρδίᾳ τοῦ θανατῶσαι.
17	וַיֶּאֱהַ֣ב קְ֭לָלָה וַתְּבוֹאֵ֑הוּ וְֽלֹא־חָפֵ֥ץ בִּ֝בְרָכָ֗ה וַתִּרְחַ֥ק מִמֶּֽנּוּ׃	As he loved cursing, so let it come unto him: as he delighted not in blessing, so let it be far from him.	καὶ ἠγάπησε κατάραν, καὶ ἥξει αὐτῷ· καὶ οὐκ ἠθέλησεν εὐλογίαν, καὶ μακρυνθήσεται ἀπ᾿ αὐτοῦ.
18	וַיִּלְבַּ֥שׁ קְלָלָ֗ה כְּמַ֫דּ֥וֹ וַתָּבֹ֣א כַמַּ֣יִם בְּקִרְבּ֑וֹ וְ֝כַשֶּׁ֗מֶן בְּעַצְמוֹתָֽיו׃	As he clothed himself with cursing like as with his garment, so let it come into his bowels like water, and like oil into his bones.	καὶ ἐνεδύσατο κατάραν ὡς ἱμάτιον, καὶ εἰσῆλθεν ὡσεὶ ὕδωρ εἰς τὰ ἔγκατα αὐτοῦ καὶ ὡσεὶ ἔλαιον ἐν τοῖς ὀστέοις αὐτοῦ.
19	תְּהִי־ל֭וֹ כְּבֶ֣גֶד יַעְטֶ֑ה וּ֝לְמֵ֗זַח תָּמִ֥יד יַחְגְּרֶֽהָ׃	Let it be unto him as the garment which covereth him, and for a girdle wherewith he is girded continually.	γενηθήτω αὐτῷ ὡς ἱμάτιον, ὃ περιβάλλεται, καὶ ὡσεὶ ζώνη, ἣν διαπαντὸς περιζώννυται.
20	זֹ֤את פְּעֻלַּ֣ת שֹׂ֭טְנַי מֵאֵ֣ת יְהֹוָ֑ה וְהַדֹּבְרִ֥ים רָ֝֗ע עַל־נַפְשִֽׁי׃	Let this be the reward of mine adversaries from the LORD, and of them that speak evil against my soul.	τοῦτο τὸ ἔργον τῶν ἐνδιαβαλλόντων με παρὰ Κυρίου καὶ τῶν λαλούντων πονηρὰ κατὰ τῆς ψυχῆς μου.
21	וְאַתָּ֤ה ׀ יֱ֘הֹוִ֤ה אֲדֹנָ֗י עֲֽשֵׂה־אִ֭תִּי לְמַ֣עַן שְׁמֶ֑ךָ כִּי־ט֥וֹב חַ֝סְדְּךָ֗ הַצִּילֵֽנִי׃	But do thou for me, O GOD the Lord, for thy name's sake: because thy mercy is good, deliver thou me.	καὶ σύ, Κύριε Κύριε, ποίησον μετ᾿ ἐμοῦ ἕνεκεν τοῦ ὀνόματός σου, ὅτι χρηστὸν τὸ ἔλεός σου. ῥῦσαί με,
22	כִּי־עָנִ֣י וְאֶבְי֣וֹן אָנֹ֑כִי וְ֝לִבִּ֗י חָלַ֥ל בְּקִרְבִּֽי׃	For I am poor and needy, and my heart is wounded within me.	ὅτι πτωχὸς καὶ πένης εἰμὶ ἐγώ, καὶ ἡ καρδία μου τετάρακται ἐντός μου.
23	כְּצֵל־כִּנְטוֹת֥וֹ נֶהֱלָ֑כְתִּי נִ֝נְעַ֗רְתִּי כָּאַרְבֶּֽה׃	I am gone like the shadow when it declineth: I am tossed up and down as the locust.	ὡσεὶ σκιὰ ἐν τῷ ἐκκλῖναι αὐτὴν ἀντανῃρέθην, ἐξετινάχθην ὡσεὶ ἀκρίδες.
24	בִּ֭רְכַּי כָּשְׁל֣וּ מִצּ֑וֹם וּ֝בְשָׂרִ֗י כָּחַ֥שׁ מִשָּֽׁמֶן׃	My knees are weak through fasting; and my flesh faileth of fatness.	τὰ γόνατά μου ἠσθένησαν ἀπὸ νηστείας, καὶ ἡ σάρξ μου ἠλλοιώθη δι᾿ ἔλαιον.
25	וַאֲנִ֤י ׀ הָיִ֣יתִי חֶרְפָּ֣ה לָהֶ֑ם יִ֝רְא֗וּנִי יְנִיע֥וּן רֹאשָֽׁם׃	I became also a reproach unto them: when they looked upon me they shaked their heads.	κἀγὼ ἐγενήθην ὄνειδος αὐτοῖς· εἴδοσάν με, ἐσάλευσαν κεφαλὰς αὐτῶν.
26	עׇ֭זְרֵנִי יְהֹוָ֣ה אֱלֹהָ֑י ה֖וֹשִׁיעֵ֣נִי כְחַסְדֶּֽךָ׃	Help me, O LORD my God: O save me according to thy mercy:	βοήθησόν μοι, Κύριε ὁ Θεός μου, καὶ σῶσόν με κατὰ τὸ ἔλεός σου.
27	וְֽ֭יֵדְעוּ כִּי־יָ֣דְךָ זֹּ֑את אַתָּ֖ה יְהֹוָ֣ה עֲשִׂיתָֽהּ׃	That they may know that this is thy hand; that thou, LORD, hast done it.	καὶ γνώτωσαν ὅτι ἡ χείρ σου αὕτη καὶ σύ, Κύριε, ἐποίησας αὐτήν.
28	יְקַֽלְלוּ־הֵמָּה֮ וְאַתָּ֢ה תְבָ֫רֵ֥ךְ קָ֤מוּ ׀ וַיֵּבֹ֗שׁוּ וְֽעַבְדְּךָ֥ יִשְׂמָֽח׃	Let them curse, but bless thou: when they arise, let them be ashamed; but let thy servant rejoice.	καταράσονται αὐτοί, καὶ σὺ εὐλογήσεις· οἱ ἐπανιστάμενοί μοι αἰσχυνθήτωσαν, ὁ δὲ δοῦλός σου εὐφρανθήσεται.
29	יִלְבְּשׁ֣וּ שׂוֹטְנַ֣י כְּלִמָּ֑ה וְיַעֲט֖וּ כַמְעִ֣יל בׇּשְׁתָּֽם׃	Let mine adversaries be clothed with shame, and let them cover themselves with their own confusion, as with a mantle.	ἐνδυσάσθωσαν οἱ ἐνδιαβάλλοντές με ἐντροπὴν καὶ περιβαλέσθωσαν ὡς διπλοΐδα αἰσχύνην αὐτῶν.
30	א֘וֹדֶ֤ה יְהֹוָ֣ה מְאֹ֣ד בְּפִ֑י וּבְת֖וֹךְ רַבִּ֣ים אֲהַלְלֶֽנּוּ׃	I will greatly praise the LORD with my mouth; yea, I will praise him among the multitude.	ἐξομολογήσομαι τῷ Κυρίῳ σφόδρα ἐν τῷ στόματί μου καὶ ἐν μέσῳ πολλῶν αἰνέσω αὐτόν,
31	כִּֽי־יַ֭עֲמֹד לִימִ֣ין אֶבְי֑וֹן לְ֝הוֹשִׁ֗יעַ מִשֹּׁפְטֵ֥י נַפְשֽׁוֹ׃	For he shall stand at the right hand of the poor, to save him from those that condemn his soul.	ὅτι παρέστη ἐκ δεξιῶν πένητος τοῦ σῶσαι ἐκ τῶν καταδιωκόντων τὴν ψυχήν μου.

=== Analysis ===
The New Oxford Annotated Bible titles this psalm "Prayer for deliverance from enemies", as one of the Imprecatory Psalms against deceitful foes. It starts with the psalmist's plea in verses 1–5, followed by an extensive imprecation (verses 6–19, concluded or summed up in verse 20). The renewed pleading at verse 21 is made with appeals on the grounds of Yahweh's steadfast love, the details of the psalmist's own misery, and the request for vengeance to the enemies, but the lament ends with the vow to offer praise, which is common in this type of psalm (verses 30–31). In verses 8–14 the curse by the psalmist 'extends through three generations': on the person (verse 8), on the person's children (verses 9–13), and on the person's parents (verse 14). The change from plural enemies (verses 2–5) to a singular individual (verses 6–19) parallels Psalm 55.

In verse 4, there is evil given 'in return for my love'. The curses here are consistent with Proverbs 17:13, where "if evil is given for good then evil will not depart from their house". Returning evil for good is also seen in other psalms, often seen as portending Judas being an 'anti-friend' figure returning evil for good or even friendship, namely 41, 69 and here in 109.

==== Verses 2 and 30 ====
There is an inclusio near the opening and closing of the Psalm: in the opening, the Psalmist is facing the lies of accusers mouths while in the close his own mouth greatly praises God.

For the mouth of the wicked and the mouth of the deceitful are opened against me: they have spoken against me with a lying tongue.

I will greatly praise the Lord with my mouth; yea, I will praise him among the multitude.

==== Verse 8 ====
Let his days be few; and let another take his office.

The Apostle Peter quoted verse 8 ("Let another take his office") before the apostles elected the replacement for Judas Iscariot in Acts 1:16–20, appointing Matthias in his place.

==== Verse 12 ====
Let there be none to extend mercy unto him: neither let there be any to favour his fatherless children.

- "Let there be none to extend mercy unto him" or "Let him have none to continue lovingkindness to him as represented in his children"; nor "anyone have pity" on his orphaned children. The phrase "to extend mercy" is translated from Hebrew: משך חסד, mō-šêḵ chā-seḏ, which can also mean "to draw out mercy" in the sense of "causing it to continue and last" (cf. Psalm 36:11; Jeremiah 31:3)

==== Verse 13 ====
Let his posterity be cut off; and in the generation following let their name be blotted out.

- "Let his posterity be cut off": or "may his sons die childless" (cf. Psalm 37:28, 37:38; Job 18:13–21).
- "In the generation following their name be blotted out": or "in the next generation their name be removed from the registry of the citizens" (cf. Psalm 69:28). The extinction of a family (name) was considered the most extreme calamity for the Israelites.

==== Verse 31 ====
For He shall stand at the right hand of the poor,
To save him from those who condemn him.

The close of the psalm has God at the right hand of the poor man, in striking contrast with the opening of Psalm 110, where God calls a man to sit at his right hand, made forever like the priest king, Melchizedek.

== Sources ==
- Coogan, Michael David (2007). Coogan, Michael David; Brettler, Marc Zvi; Newsom, Carol Ann; Perkins, Pheme (eds.). The New Oxford Annotated Bible with the Apocryphal/Deuterocanonical Books: New Revised Standard Version, Issue 48 (Augmented 3rd ed.). Oxford University Press. ISBN 9780195288810.
- Motyer, J. A. (1994). "The Psalms". In Carson, D. A.; France, R. T.; Motyer, J. A.; Wenham, G. J. (eds.). New Bible Commentary: 21st Century Edition (4, illustrated, reprint, revised ed.). Inter-Varsity Press. pp. 485–583. ISBN 9780851106489.
- Rodd, C. S. (2007). "18. Psalms". In Barton, John; Muddiman, John (eds.). The Oxford Bible Commentary (first (paperback) ed.). Oxford University Press. pp. 355–405. ISBN 978-0199277186.
