= Oh, whistle and I'll come to you, my lad =

1787 poem and song by Robert Burns

"Oh, whistle and I'll come to you, my lad" is the title and refrain of a poem and song by Robert Burns, first written in 1787, and then expanded in 1793.

== Development ==
The air called "Oh, whistle and I'll come to you, my lad" was composed around the middle of the eighteenth century by John Bruce, a famous fiddler of Dumfries. John O'Keeffe added it to his pasticcio opera The Poor Soldier (1783) for the song "Since love is the plan, I'll love if I can".

Robert Burns wrote two sets of words to the tune, using the existing title as the first line for both versions. The first was written for James Johnson's Scots Musical Museum (volume 2, 1788), and consists of only two verses. The second version was written for George Thomson's A Select Collection of Original Scottish Airs for the Voice (1793), and consists of a chorus and three verses.

== Text ==
=== First version (1787) ===
O, whistle, and I'll come to you, my lad,
O, whistle, and I'll come to you, my lad,
Tho' father and mither and a' should gae mad,
O, whistle, and I'll come to you, my lad.

Come down the back stairs when you come to court me,
Come down the back stairs when you come to court me,
Come down the back stairs, and let nae body see,
And come as ye were na coming to me.

=== Second version (1793) ===
O, whistle, and I'll come to you, my lad;
O, whistle, and I'll come to you, my lad;
The' father, and mother, and a' should gae mad,
O, whistle, and I'll come to you, my lad.

But warily tent, when you come to court me,
And come na unless the back-yett be a jee;
Syne up the back-stile, and let nae body see,
And come as ye were na comin' to me,
And come as ye were na comin' to me.
O, whistle, etc.

At kirk or at market, whene'er ye meet me,
Gang by me as though that ye cared na a flie;
But steal me a blink o' your bonnie black e'e,
Yet look as ye were na lookin' at me,
Yet look as ye were na lookin' at me.
O, whistle, etc.

Aye vow and protest that ye care na for me,
And whyles ye may lichtly my beauty a wee;
But court na anither, though jokin' ye be,
For fear that she wyle your fancy frae me,
For fear that she wyle your fancy frae me.
O, whistle, etc.

== In popular culture ==
In 1904 it was used as the title of "'Oh, Whistle, and I'll Come to You, My Lad'" in the book Ghost Stories of an Antiquary by M. R. James in which a man digs up a bronze whistle in a possible Templar preceptory.

It was also mentioned in the series "Emily of New Moon" by L. M. Montgomery as a signal for Teddy and Emily to meet in the garden.

It gets invoked as a chapter title for The Woman in Black by Susan Hill.

It is set to music by Thea Musgrave in her set "Songs for a Winter's Evening".
