= Whistle and I'll Come to You (1968 film) =

British television ghost story

- The apparition in the famous beach scene in "Whistle and I'll Come to You" was achieved with a ragged cloth suspended on a wire.
- Based on: "'Oh, Whistle, and I'll Come to You, My Lad'" by M. R. James
- Written by: Jonathan Miller
- Directed by: Jonathan Miller
- Starring: Michael Hordern as Professor Parkin

Production
- Running time: 42 minutes

Original release
- Release: 7 May 1968

Related
- Omnibus

Whistle and I'll Come to You is a supernatural short television film which aired as an episode of the British documentary series Omnibus. Written and directed by Jonathan Miller, it is based on the ghost story "'Oh, Whistle, and I'll Come to You, My Lad'" by M. R. James, first published in the collection Ghost Stories of an Antiquary (1904), and first aired on BBC1 on 7 May 1968.

It stars Michael Hordern as Prof. Parkin, a Cambridge academic who, whilst on holiday at a coastal East Anglian village, finds a strange whistle whilst exploring a Knights Templar cemetery exposed by coastal erosion. When blown, the whistle unleashes a frightening supernatural force.

Its success directly inspired Lawrence Gordon Clark to create the supernatural anthology series A Ghost Story for Christmas, which based the majority of its episodes on James stories. The series would produce its own adaptation of the story in 2010. Retrospective critical discussion of Whistle and I'll Come to You tends to regard it as a part of the later series, and likewise most home video releases of A Ghost Story for Christmas include Whistle and I'll Come to You.

== Plot summary ==
Professor Parkin, a fussy Cambridge academic, arrives for an off-season stay at a hotel somewhere on the English east coast. Preferring to keep to himself, Parkin spends his stay walking along the dunes and beach rather than golfing. He visits an old graveyard, abandoned and overgrown. Spotting a small object protruding from a grave which is partly undermined by the edge of the cliff he discovers it to be a bone whistle and stuffs it into his pocket. Walking along the shore, he turns twice into the setting sun to see a dark silhouetted figure standing alone in the distance.

Back in his hotel room, he cleans and inspects the whistle, revealing a carved inscription: "Quis est iste qui venit" ("Who is this who is coming?"). He blows the whistle and soon a wind storm rises outdoors. Later that night, Parkin is kept awake by mysterious noises in his hotel room. At breakfast the following morning, another guest at the hotel, a retired colonel, asks Parkin if he believes in ghosts. Parkin responds in an academic fashion, dismissing such beliefs as philosophically incoherent. (He even reverses Hamlet's famous line, saying that "There are more things in philosophy than are dreamt of in heaven and earth".) That night, Parkin appears to have disturbing dreams of a spectre pursuing him on the beach. His nerves are not helped when, the following morning, he is informed by the maids that both of the beds in his room have been slept in – although Parkin only slept in one.

Increasingly disturbed, he searches a book on spiritualism for answers. That night, he is awakened by a nearby sound of rustling. As he sits up in bed, the sheets from the opposite bed rise and stretch into the phantom from the dream. Parkin is too terrified to speak, emitting only frightened noises as he begins sucking his thumb. The disturbance wakes the colonel, who comes to investigate. Parkin sits in stunned terror at what he has just witnessed, repeating only the words, "Oh no."

== Cast ==
- Michael Hordern – Professor Parkin
- Ambrose Coghill – Colonel
- George Woodbridge – Hotel Proprietor
- Nora Gordon – Proprietress
- Freda Dowie – Maid

== Production ==
Jonathan Miller adapted his 1968 version as part of the BBC arts strand Omnibus, which consisted mainly of arts documentaries so the dramatic adaptation was unusual; David Kerekes notes that this probably explains Miller's documentary-like introduction to the film. Ian McDowell notes that the adaptation itself changes a number of aspects of James' story, turning the academic, described as "young, neat and precise of speech" into a bumbling, awkward, middle-aged eccentric. Hordern had already played the central role in a similar manner in an earlier BBC radio adaptation made without Miller's involvement.

The television adaptation was filmed on the Norfolk coast, at Waxham and nearby.

== Reception ==
This version is highly regarded amongst television ghost story adaptations and described by Mark Duguid of the British Film Institute as "A masterpiece of economical horror that remains every bit as chilling as the day it was first broadcast". A BBC Press Release for its repeat showing in 1969 stated that it was an "unconventional adaptation...remarkable, both for its uncanny sense of period and atmosphere, and for the quality of the actors' performances".

The performance of Michael Hordern is especially acclaimed, with his hushed mutterings and repetition of other characters' words, coupled with a discernible lack of social skills, turning the professor from an academic caricature into a more rounded character, described by horror aficionado David Kerekes as "especially daring for its day". The stage journal Plays and Players suggests that Hordern's performance hints that the professor suffers from a neurological condition called the "idea of a presence". Much of the script was improvised on location with the actors.

== Home media releases ==
The television adaptation survived destruction and was first released in the UK on DVD by the British Film Institute in 2002. The BFI later released both the 1968 and the 2010 version in a single volume DVD, and as part of an M. R. James boxset in 2012. Both versions were released in Australia by Shock DVD in 2011 as part of a five-disc DVD set of the BBC's M.R. James TV adaptations. The BFI issued a new HD remaster from the original negative on Blu-ray in 2022, in a set with the first three episodes of A Ghost Story for Christmas and with the 2010 version as an extra.
