= List of The Avengers (TV series) episodes =

This is an episode list for the 1960s British television series The Avengers. The series was aired in Britain, on ITV, between 1961 and 1969.

The first four series were made in black-and-white. The first three were pre-recorded on videotape (except where noted) with occasional filmed inserts. Beginning with series 4 the series moved to all-film production, shot using the single-camera method. From series 5 onward, the episodes were filmed in colour. The sixth series was broadcast in the US before it was shown in the UK.

== Series overview ==
UK series / episodes			First UK broadcast		US season / episodes		US air dates	Principal characters	Production format	Production company
UK series / episodes			Start	End	US season / episodes		US air dates	Principal characters	Production format	Production company
1	26		7 Jan 1961	30 Dec 1961	—			Dr. Keel and Steed	black and white video	ABC Television (UK) (Note: Endcap: "ABC production" with ABC Weekend's triangle logo; Beaumont, Ian. "The Avengers". ABC at large. Transdiffusion Broadcasting System.)
2	26		29 Sep 1962	23 Mar 1963	—			Steed and Cathy Gale, Venus Smith or Dr. King	black and white video	ABC Television (UK)
3	26		28 Sep 1963	21 Mar 1964	—			Steed and Cathy Gale	black and white video	ABC Television (UK)
4	26		28 Sep 1965	22 Mar 1966	1	26	28 Mar – 1 Sep 1966	Steed and Mrs. Emma Peel	black and white film	Associated British Productions for ABC (UK) and ABC (US)
5	24	16	9 Jan 1967	3 May 1967	2	16	20 Jan – 19 May 1967	Steed and Mrs. Emma Peel	colour film	ABC Television Films for ABC (UK) (Note: Endcap: "ABC Production: Associated British Corporation"; Beaumont, Ian. "The Avengers". ABC at large. Transdiffusion Broadcasting System.) and ABC (US)
5	24	8	27 Sep 1967	15 Nov 1967	3	15	10 Jan – 8 May 1968	Steed and Mrs. Emma Peel	colour film	ABC Television Films for ABC (UK) and ABC (US)
6	33		25 Sep 1968	17 May 1969	3	15	10 Jan – 8 May 1968	Steed and Tara King	colour film	ABC Television Films for ABC (US) and Thames
6	33		25 Sep 1968	17 May 1969	4	26	23 Sep 1968 – 21 Apr 1969	Steed and Tara King	colour film	ABC Television Films for ABC (US) and Thames

== Series 1 (1961) ==
Note: The only episodes from the first series known to exist in complete form are Girl on the Trapeze (which does not feature John Steed), The Frighteners and Tunnel of Fear; additionally, the first 14 minutes—the first reel—of the premiere episode, Hot Snow, have been rediscovered and released on DVD. The most recent discovery was in 2016, when Tunnel of Fear was found intact in a private collection.

Cast: Unless noted in the table below, all episodes in the first series feature Ian Hendry (as Dr. David Keel) and Patrick Macnee (as John Steed).

Nº	Ep	Title	Directed by	Written by	Guest cast	First broadcast (Note: ABC North)	Prod. code	Episode status
1	1	"Hot Snow"	Don Leaver	Patrick Brawn, Ray Rigby	Catherine Woodville, Philip Stone, Godfrey Quigley, Moira Redmond, Murray Melvin, Alister Williamson, Charles Wade	7 January 1961	3365	Only Act 1 (the first 14 minutes) is Intact. Acts 2 and 3 are Missing.
2	2	"Brought to Book"	Peter Hammond	Patrick Brawn, Brian Clemens	Philip Stone, Robert James, Godfrey Quigley, Neil McCarthy, Charles Morgan, Michael Collins, Alister Williamson, Clifford Elkin	14 January 1961	3366	Missing
3	3	"Square Root of Evil"	Don Leaver	Richard Harris	Alex Scott, George Murcell, Heron Carvic, John Woodvine	21 January 1961	3367	Broadcast live, Missing
4	4	"Nightmare"	Peter Hammond	Terence Feely	Gordon Boyd, Ingrid Hafner, Helen Lindsay, Michael Logan, Robert Bruce, Redmond Bailey, Robert Sansom	28 January 1961	3368	Broadcast live, Missing
5	5	"Crescent Moon"	John Knight	Geoffrey Bellman, Patrick Brawn	Roger Delgado, Patience Collier, Eric Thompson	4 February 1961	3369	Broadcast live, Missing
6	6	"Girl on the Trapeze"	Don Leaver	Dennis Spooner	Kenneth J. Warren, Edwin Richfield, Ivor Salter, David Grey	11 February 1961	3370	Broadcast live, Intact; Steed is absent from this episode
7	7	"Diamond Cut Diamond"	Peter Hammond	Max Marquis	Sandra Dorne	18 February 1961	3371	Broadcast live, Missing
8	8	"The Radioactive Man"	Robert Tronson	Patrick Brawn	George Pravda, Gerald Sim, Christine Pollon, John Gayford, Paul Grist, John Kelland	25 February 1961	3372	Broadcast live, Missing
9	9	"Ashes of Roses"	Don Leaver	Peter Ling, Sheilah Ward	Mark Eden, Gordon Rollings, Edward Dentith	4 March 1961	3373	Broadcast live, Missing
10	10	"Hunt the Man Down"	Peter Hammond	Richard Harris	Melissa Stribling, Maurice Good	18 March 1961	3374	Missing
11	11	"Please Don't Feed the Animals"	Dennis Vance	Dennis Spooner	Tenniel Evans	1 April 1961	3375	Missing
12	12	"Dance with Death"	Don Leaver	Peter Ling, Sheilah Ward	Caroline Blakiston, Angela Douglas, Geoffrey Palmer, Neil Wilson	15 April 1961	3376	Missing
13	13	"One for the Mortuary"	Peter Hammond	Brian Clemens	Frank Gatliff, Peter Madden, Dennis Edwards, Steven Scott	29 April 1961	3377	Missing
14	14	"The Springers"	Don Leaver	Geoffrey Bellman, John Whitney	Charles Farrell, Arthur Howard, Douglas Muir, Brian Murphy, David Webb, Donald Morley	13 May 1961	3411	Missing
15	15	"The Frighteners"	Peter Hammond	Berkely Mather	Willoughby Goddard, Stratford Johns, Doris Hare, Philip Locke, Godfrey James, Neil Wilson, Eric Elliott	27 May 1961	3412	Intact
16	16	"The Yellow Needle"	Don Leaver	Patrick Campbell	Wolfe Morris, Eric Dodson, Michael Barrington, Margaret Whiting	10 June 1961	3413	Missing
17	17	"Death on the Slipway"	Peter Hammond	James Mitchell	Nyree Dawn Porter, Peter Arne, Frank Thornton, Hamilton Dyce, Gary Watson, Tom Adams, Patrick Connor	24 June 1961	3414	Missing
18	18	"Double Danger"	Roger Jenkins	John Lucarotti, Gerald Verner	Kevin Brennan, Ron Pember, Peter Reynolds	8 July 1961	3415	Missing
19	19	"Toy Trap"	Don Leaver	Bill Strutton	Tony Van Bridge, Ann Tirard	22 July 1961	3416	Missing
20	20	"Tunnel of Fear"	Guy Verney	John Kruse	John Salew, Morris Perry	5 August 1961	3417	Intact
21	21	"The Far Distant Dead"	Peter Hammond	John Lucarotti	Katherine Blake, Tom Adams, Reed De Rouen, Francis de Wolff	19 August 1961	3418	Missing; Steed is absent from this episode.
22	22	"Kill the King"	Roger Jenkins	James Mitchell	Burt Kwouk, Peter Barkworth, Patrick Allen, Moira Redmond, Andy Ho	2 September 1961	3419	Missing
23	23	"Dead of Winter"	Don Leaver	Eric Paice	John Woodvine, Neil Hallett	9 December 1961	3423	Missing
24	24	"The Deadly Air"	John Knight	Lester Powell	John Stratton, Allan Cuthbertson, Ann Bell, Geoffrey Bayldon, Michael Hawkins, Keith Anderson	16 December 1961	3422	Missing
25	25	"A Change of Bait"	Don Leaver	Lewis Davidson	John Bailey, Tim Barrett, Henry Lincoln, Graham Rigby	23 December 1961	3421	Missing
26	26	"Dragonsfield"	Peter Hammond	Terence Feely	Sylva Langova, Alfred Burke, Barbara Shelley, Ronald Leigh-Hunt, Michael Robbins, Eric Dodson, Keith Barron, Morris Perry, Steven Scott	30 December 1961	3420	Missing; Keel is absent from this episode.

The first three series were all made in-house by ABC Weekend TV at their Teddington television studios.

Following series 1, a lengthy Equity actors' strike prevented development of the second series, and Ian Hendry decided to leave the show. When The Avengers eventually returned, Macnee had become the show's lead, accompanied by a range of male and (predominantly) female co-stars.

== Series 2 (1962–1963) ==
Cast: Series 2 featured Patrick Macnee as John Steed in all 26 episodes. Either Jon Rollason (as Dr. Martin King, in 3 episodes) or Julie Stevens (as Venus Smith, in 6 episodes) accompanied him as noted in the table; with all of the other 17 episodes featuring Honor Blackman (as Mrs. Cathy Gale) accompanying Steed. All episodes intact.

Nº	Ep	Title	Directed by	Written by	Guest cast	Co-star	First broadcast	Prod. code
27	1	"Mr Teddy Bear"	Richmond Harding	Martin Woodhouse	Michael Robbins, John Ruddock, Michael Collins	Cathy	29 September 1962; ABC	3506
Steed and Cathy must track down an elusive assassin nicknamed Mr. Teddy Bear.
28	2	"Propellant 23"	Jonathan Alwyn	Jon Manchip White	Catherine Woodville, Justine Lord, Nicholas Courtney, Geoffrey Palmer, John Dearth, Barry Wilsher, John Gill, Graham Ashley	Cathy	6 October 1962; ABC	3505
Steed and Cathy must retrieve a flask of top secret rocket fuel stolen from a murdered courier at a French airport.
29	3	"The Decapod"	Don Leaver	Eric Paice	Philip Madoc, Paul Stassino, Wolfe Morris, Raymond Adamson, Valentino Musetti	Venus	13 October 1962; ABC	3507
Steed is brought in to protect the President of a Balkan Republic from a masked assassin. He sends Venus on a phony tour, with real wrestlers.
30	4	"Bullseye"	Peter Hammond	Eric Paice	Ronald Radd, Judy Parfitt, Bernard Kay, Fred Ferris, Robin Wentworth	Cathy	20 October 1962; ABC	3508
Steed and Cathy investigate illegal gunrunning to Africa by a British arms manufacturer.
31	5	"Mission to Montreal"	Don Leaver	Lester Powell	Patricia English, Mark Eden, Alan Curtis, John Bennett, Pamela Ann Davy, Terence Woodfield, Malcolm Taylor	Dr. King	27 October 1962; ABC	3500
Steed and Dr. King are assigned a mission to recover a microfilm containing the stolen plans of a missile early warning system. Shipboard, they meet knives and a drunken film star.
32	6	"The Removal Men"	Don Leaver	Roger Marshall, Jeremy Scott	Edwin Richfield, Edina Ronay, Reed De Rouen, Andria Lawrence, George Little	Venus	3 November 1962; ABC	3509
Steed goes undercover to infiltrate a clique of assassins based in France.
33	7	"The Mauritius Penny"	Richmond Harding	Malcolm Hulke, Terrance Dicks	Alfred Burke, David Langton, Sylva Langova, Richard Vernon, Philip Guard	Cathy	10 November 1962; ABC	3510
A philatelist is murdered after discovering an extremely rare and valuable stamp on sale. Steed and Cathy investigate and encounter a naughty dentist.
34	8	"Death of a Great Dane"	Peter Hammond	Roger Marshall, Jeremy Scott	Frederick Jaeger, John Laurie, Leslie French, Roger Maxwell, Dennis Edwards, Anthony Baird, Eric Elliott	Cathy	17 November 1962; ABC	3511
When a road accident victim is found to have £50,000 worth of diamonds in his stomach, Steed and Cathy are called in to investigate.
35	9	"The Sell-Out"	Don Leaver	Anthony Terpiloff, Brandon Brady	Frank Gatliff, Carleton Hobbs, Arthur Hewlett	Dr. King	24 November 1962; ABC	3502
Steed, though under suspicion himself, leads an operation to flush out a traitor plotting to assassinate a foreign dignitary. Dr. King initially refuses to be involved, but comes to Steed's aid.
36	10	"Death on the Rocks"	Jonathan Alwyn	Eric Paice	Naomi Chance, Hamilton Dyce, Gerald Cross	Cathy	1 December 1962; ABC	3512
Steed and Cathy investigate a gang of criminals who are flooding the market with smuggled diamonds.
37	11	"Traitor in Zebra"	Richmond Harding	John Gilbert	William Gaunt, Richard Leech, John Sharp, Noel Coleman, June Murphy	Cathy	8 December 1962; ABC	3513
In Wales, a new satellite tracking system is being jammed every time it is used. Steed and Cathy search for the traitor who is passing on information about the project.
38	12	"The Big Thinker"	Kim Mills	Martin Woodhouse	Tenniel Evans, Antony Booth, David Garth, Penelope Lee, Marina Martin	Cathy	15 December 1962; ABC	3514
A new cryogenic missile defence system computer, Plato, springs a deadly leak. Sabotage? Murder? Steed investigates while Cathy plays cards with sharks.
39	13	"Death Dispatch"	Jonathan Alwyn	Leonard Fincham	Gerald Harper, Alan Mason, Geoff L'Cise	Cathy	22 December 1962; ABC	3503
Steed and Cathy get a job as bait in South America, investigating the murder of a British courier in Jamaica.
40	14	"Dead on Course"	Richmond Harding	Eric Paice	Donal Donnelly, Bruce Boa, Edward Kelsey, Janet Hargreaves, Denis Cleary	Dr. King	29 December 1962; ABC	3501
Canadian aircraft crash off course, near an Irish convent - but what happened to the crew?
41	15	"Intercrime"	Jonathan Alwyn	Malcolm Hulke, Terrance Dicks	Julia Arnall, Kenneth J. Warren, Angela Browne, Jerome Willis, Patrick Holt, Alan Browning	Cathy	5 January 1963; ABC	3515
Mrs. Catherine Gale takes on the identity of an assassin to infiltrate a criminal gang. However, things get complicated when the real assassin escapes from prison.
42	16	"Immortal Clay"	Richmond Harding	James Mitchell	Paul Eddington, James Bree, Gary Watson, Steve Plytas	Cathy	11 January 1963; Teledu Cymru 12 January, ABC	3516
A company invents an unbreakable ceramic, the secret of which others try to steal. Following the death of an industrial spy in a vat of liquid clay, Steed and Cathy mount an undercover investigation.
43	17	"Box of Tricks"	Kim Mills	Peter Ling, Edward Rhodes	Edgar Wreford, Royston Tickner, Robert Hartley, Dallas Cavell	Venus	18 January 1963; Teledu Cymru 19 January, ABC	3517
The death of a nightclub magician's assistant leads through a crippled general and his quack, to employment opportunities and secret documents. Steed enlists the help of Venus to root out the criminals by becoming the new assistant.
44	18	"Warlock"	Peter Hammond	Doreen Montgomery	Peter Arne, John Hollis, Brian Vaughan	Cathy	25 January 1963; Teledu Cymru 26 January, ABC	3504
The inventor of a new type of fuel lapses into a coma. Steed discovers that the scientist had links to black magic and the occult.
45	19	"The Golden Eggs"	Peter Hammond	Martin Woodhouse	Peter Arne, Donald Eccles	Cathy	1 February 1963; Teledu Cymru 2 February, ABC	3518
A burglar steals two gold-plated eggs from a laboratory, not knowing that they contain a deadly virus.
46	20	"School for Traitors"	Jonathan Alwyn	James Mitchell	Anthony Nicholls, Melissa Stribling, Reginald Marsh, Richard Thorp, Terence Woodfield	Venus	8 February 1963; Teledu Cymru 9 February, ABC	3519
During a spate of suicides at a university, a burglar seeks a note to Venus. Steed uncovers a sinister plot to blackmail students into espionage activities.
47	21	"The White Dwarf"	Richmond Harding	Malcolm Hulke	Philip Latham, Peter Copley, George A. Cooper, Constance Chapman, Keith Pyott, George Roubicek, Paul Anil	Cathy	15 February 1963; Teledu Cymru 16 February, ABC	3520
A leading astronomer predicts that the earth is about to be destroyed. Steed and Cathy investigate a conspiracy to silence him.
48	22	"Man in the Mirror"	Kim Mills	Geoffrey Orme, Anthony Terpiloff	Ray Barrett, Michael Gover, David Graham, Haydn Jones	Venus	22 February 1963; Teledu Cymru 23 February, ABC	3521
A cipher expert commits suicide at an amusement park; however, Venus Smith discovers that she has taken a photograph of the man several days later, apparently very much alive. Steed investigates the mystery.
49	23	"Conspiracy of Silence"	Peter Hammond	Roger Marshall	Robert Rietti, Sandra Dorne, Roy Purcell, Willie Shearer	Cathy	1 March 1963; Teledu Cymru 2 March, ABC	3522
Steed and Cathy investigate a Mafia drugs gang using a travelling circus as a front. Clowning around leads a nosy journalist to use her judo.
50	24	"A Chorus of Frogs"	Raymond Menmuir	Martin Woodhouse	John Carson, Eric Pohlmann, Frank Gatliff, Michael Gover, Alan Haywood	Venus	9 March 1963; ABC	3523
Steed takes a holiday to Greece. While there, he is asked to investigate the death of a Greek deep-sea diver and smuggler, who was part of a group of part-time agents known as "the Frogs".
51	25	"Six Hands Across a Table"	Richmond Harding	Reed De Rouen	Guy Doleman, Campbell Singer, Philip Madoc, Edward de Souza, John Wentworth, Ilona Rodgers, Ian Cunningham	Cathy	16 March 1963; ABC	3524
Cathy becomes romantically-involved with shipyard owner Oliver Waldner, blissfully unaware that he is masterminding a dastardly plan to gain control of most of Britain’s shipbuilding industry. After she nearly dies in an apparent accident, Steed sets out to prove that Waldner has murdered a business rival.
52	26	"Killer Whale"	Kim Mills	John Lucarotti	Patrick Magee, Morris Perry, John Bailey, Kenneth Farrington, John Tate, Christopher Coll	Cathy	23 March 1963; ABC	3525
Steed investigates a possible link between the proprietors of a boxing ring and the illegal smuggling of ambergris.

NOTE: The episode "Death of a Great Dane" was later re-made during series 5 as "The £50,000 Breakfast".

== Series 3 (1963–1964) ==
Cast: Series 3 stars Patrick Macnee as John Steed and Honor Blackman as Mrs. Cathy Gale. It was the last series to be shot "as live" on videotape.

Nº	Ep	Title	Directed by	Written by	Guest cast	First broadcast	Prod. code
53	1	"Brief for Murder"	Peter Hammond	Brian Clemens	John Laurie, Michael Goldie, Fred Ferris, Alec Ross	28 September 1963	3600
Steed and Cathy set a trap to catch two corrupt lawyers.
54	2	"The Undertakers"	Bill Bain	Malcolm Hulke	Lee Patterson, Jan Holden, Patrick Holt, Lally Bowers, Mandy Miller	5 October 1963	3608
Why are they coming for people who aren't dead yet? A dodgy retirement home is being used as part of a scam to avoid inheritance tax. Steed and Cathy investigate.
55	3	"Man with Two Shadows"	Don Leaver	James Mitchell	Geoffrey Palmer, Paul Whitsun-Jones, Robert Lankesheer Philip Anthony, George Little, Terence Lodge	12 October 1963	3605
An agent who has been given multiple personalities reveals a plot to assassinate key government scientists and officials and replace them with doppelgangers. Cathy has to identify the real Steed and eliminate his imposter.[3]
56	4	"The Nutshell"	Raymond Menmuir	Philip Chambers	Charles Tingwell, John Cater, Patricia Haines, Edina Ronay	19 October 1963	3602
Steed and Cathy investigate espionage by a pretty burglar in "The Nutshell", codename for a top-secret underground nuclear shelter. They are not telling each other everything, and somewhere a traitor lurks.
57	5	"Death of a Batman"	Kim Mills	Roger Marshall	André Morell, Philip Madoc	26 October 1963	3609
Steed attends his wartime batman's funeral and discovers that the deceased has unexpectedly left a very substantial sum of money. Cathy's photography leads to violence and electronics. The answer to the mystery involves illegal insider trading.
58	6	"November Five"	Bill Bain	Eric Paice	David Davies, David Langton, Aimée Delamain	2 November 1963	3611
Newly elected Member of Parliament, Michael Dyter, fakes his own death only to reappear later in possession of a nuclear bomb which he threatens to detonate on 5 November, in London. Steed and Cathy go into politics, during a race against time to hunt him down.
59	7	"The Gilded Cage"	Bill Bain	Roger Marshall	Patrick Magee, Edric Connor, Norman Chappell, Alan Haywood, Martin Friend, Geoff L'Cise, Neil Wilson	9 November 1963	3614
Steed and Cathy set out to snare criminal mastermind John P. Spagge using a gold bullion robbery as bait. Postal cards and a gas figure prominently.
60	8	"Second Sight"	Peter Hammond	Martin Woodhouse	John Carson, Peter Bowles, Ronald Adam, Steven Scott	16 November 1963	3612
A multi-millionaire is about to receive a corneal graft to treat his blindness. Steed is tasked with escorting the live corneas from Switzerland to London. However, when the eye surgeon involved expresses concerns about the operation, he is murdered, causing Steed to mount his own investigation. Mrs Gale plays a doctor.
61	9	"The Medicine Men"	Kim Mills	Malcolm Hulke	Peter Barkworth, Harold Innocent	23 November 1963	3615
Steed and Cathy investigate a conspiracy to flood the market with counterfeit medicines.
62	10	"The Grandeur That Was Rome"	Kim Mills	Rex Edwards	Hugh Burden, Colette Wilde, John Flint, Ian Shand, Raymond Adamson, Kenneth Keeling, Colin Rix	30 November 1963	3607
A megalomaniac food manufacturer who is obsessed with ancient Rome is deliberately tainting his company's grain with ergot. Steed and Cathy are brought in to investigate.
63	11	"The Golden Fleece"	Peter Hammond	Roger Marshall, Phyllis Norman	Warren Mitchell, Tenniel Evans, Michael Hawkins, Robert Lee, Barbara Yu Ling	7 December 1963	3603
Steed accidentally picks up the wrong coat when leaving a Chinese restaurant and discovers a cheque for £5,000 in the pocket. Further investigation reveals that the restaurant is being used as a front for illegal gold smuggling. An unexpected twist to the plot is that part of the proceeds is being used to assist needy ex-servicemen.
64	12	"Don't Look Behind You"	Peter Hammond	Brian Clemens	Kenneth Colley, Janine Gray, Maurice Good	14 December 1963	3606
Cathy is invited to the stately home of Sir Cavalier Rasagne, only to find that she has been lured into a trap by Martin Goodman, a deluded criminal who believes that she broke his heart.
65	13	"Death a la Carte"	Kim Mills	John Lucarotti	Robert James, Gordon Rollings, David Nettheim, Valentino Musetti, Henry Lincoln, Ken Parry	21 December 1963	3604
Steed and Cathy are assigned to protect the Emir Abdulla Akaba during his trade visit to London, but despite their best efforts in food service he is assassinated. The Avengers must discover who and what killed him.
66	14	"Dressed to Kill"	Bill Bain	Brian Clemens	Leonard Rossiter, Richard Leech, John Junkin, Anneke Wills, Alexander Davion, Leon Eagles	28 December 1963	3617
A false alarm triggers all but one of the nation's nuclear attack early warning systems. Steed and Cathy go undercover to investigate and are invited to a fancy dress party on a train. As guests die one by one, it becomes apparent that one is their killer.
67	15	"The White Elephant"	Laurence Bourne	John Lucarotti	Godfrey Quigley, Edwin Richfield, Judy Parfitt, Martin Friend	4 January 1964	3616
Following the theft of Snowy, a rare albino elephant, Steed and Cathy are brought in to investigate illegal ivory smuggling.
68	16	"The Little Wonders"	Laurence Bourne	Eric Paice	Kenneth J. Warren, David Bauer, Lois Maxwell, Harry Landis, Tony Steedman, Christopher Robbie, Mark Heath	11 January 1964	3619
Steed and Cathy infiltrate a crime syndicate whose members masquerade as members of the clergy.
69	17	"The Wringer"	Don Leaver	Martin Woodhouse	Peter Sallis, Gerald Sim, Barry Letts, Paul Whitsun-Jones, Terence Lodge	18 January 1964	3618
Five British agents are eliminated in rapid succession on an Austrian "pipeline" escape route. Steed goes to investigate and finds himself wrongfully accused of betraying them.
70	18	"Mandrake"	Bill Bain	Roger Marshall	John Le Mesurier, Annette Andre, Philip Locke	25 January 1964	3620
A large number of prominent businessmen are buried in a Cornish graveyard near a tin mine. Steed suspects foul play after a close friend meets the same fate.
71	19	"The Secrets Broker"	Jonathan Alwyn	Ludovic Peters	Patricia English, John Ringham, Jack May, Ronald Allen, Valentino Musetti	1 February 1964	3613
Spirits order a murder, leading to blackmail and a wine shop that is being used as a front for espionage activities.
72	20	"Trojan Horse"	Laurence Bourne	Malcolm Hulke	Basil Dignam, T. P. McKenna, Derek Newark	8 February 1964	3621
Steed and Cathy face horse-racing jockeys that are acting as assassins armed with binoculars firing poison darts.
73	21	"Build a Better Mousetrap"	Peter Hammond	Brian Clemens	Athene Seyler, Nora Nicholson, John Tate	15 February 1964	3610
Sisters cast a spell on a group of motorbikers that Cathy has joined, and all engines in the area stall. Could a nuclear test plant be to blame?
74	22	"The Outside-In Man"	Jonathan Alwyn	Philip Chambers	Ronald Radd, James Maxwell, Valentino Musetti, Eddie Powell, Philip Anthony, Ronald Mansell	22 February 1964	3622
Steed finds himself protecting a British defector, formerly Steed's target and now an enemy diplomat, from an assassin. Selling a used car is part of the scheme.
75	23	"The Charmers"	Bill Bain	Brian Clemens	Fenella Fielding, Warren Mitchell, Vivian Pickles, Frank Mills, John Greenwood, Peter Porteous	29 February 1964	3623
After a number of Soviet agents are murdered by an unknown third party, Steed and Cathy co-operate with their Russian counterparts to find the assassins.
76	24	"Concerto"	Kim Mills	Malcolm Hulke, Terrance Dicks	Nigel Stock, Sandor Elès, Geoffrey Colville	7 March 1964	3601
Steed and Cathy come to the rescue of a visiting Russian concert pianist who has a dead girl in his room.
77	25	"Esprit de Corps"	Don Leaver	Eric Paice	Duncan Macrae, Roy Kinnear, John Thaw, Hugh Morton, Tony Lambden	14 March 1964	3624
Steed and Cathy investigate the murder of a soldier and uncover a plot to stage a coup d'état against the British government. The regal Mrs. Catherine Gale meets a strangler who's not a true gentleman.
78	26	"Lobster Quadrille"	Kim Mills	Richard Bates	Burt Kwouk, Leslie Sands, Gary Watson, Jennie Linden, Valentino Musetti	21 March 1964	3625
Steed and Cathy investigate an illegal drug smuggling operation.

NOTE: The episode "Don't Look Behind You" was later re-made for series 5 as "The Joker", "The Charmers" was re-made, again for series 5, as "The Correct Way to Kill" and "Dressed to Kill" was in large part re-made, once again for series 5, as "The Superlative Seven". At the end of the third series, Honor Blackman left The Avengers to star in the James Bond movie Goldfinger.

== Series 4 (1965–1966) ==
Cast: Series 4 starred Patrick Macnee (as John Steed) and Diana Rigg (as Mrs. Emma Peel). It was the last series to be made in black-and-white, but also the first series to be shot entirely on film as opposed to mainly on videotape.

Episodes of this series were first broadcast in the UK on Tuesdays by Scottish Television, before ABC Weekend broadcast them four days later on Saturday.

Nº	Ep	Title	Directed by	Written by	Guest cast	First broadcast	Prod. code
79	1	"The Town of No Return"	Sidney Hayers	Brian Clemens	Alan MacNaughtan, Terence Alexander, Patrick Newell, Robert Brown, Jeremy Burnham, Juliet Harmer	28 September 1965	E.64.10.1
Steed and Emma, on the trail of several murdered agents, visit Little Bazeley by the Sea — a town that strangers rarely leave alive — and discover that it is being secretly infiltrated by enemy agents.
80	2	"The Gravediggers"	Quentin Lawrence	Malcolm Hulke	Ronald Fraser, Paul Massie, Caroline Blakiston, Charles Lamb, Wanda Ventham, Ray Austin, Steven Berkoff, Bryan Mosley, Lloyd Lamble	5 October 1965	E.64.10.8
A hospital for railwaymen is a front for a plot to destroy Britain's early warning radar system. The clues: the eccentric financier of the railwaymen's hospital who runs a miniature railway, and a spate of funerals with empty coffins ... with jamming devices.
81	3	"The Cybernauts"	Sidney Hayers	Philip Levene	Michael Gough, Frederick Jaeger, Bernard Horsfall, Burt Kwouk, John Hollis, Ronald Leigh-Hunt	12 October 1965	E.64.10.7
Industrialists are being killed off with inhuman efficiency by an assassin who is just that — inhuman! Steed's investigation leads him to a brilliant inventor who has created robotic, karate-chopping assassins in order for him to obtain a revolutionary new electronic circuit.
82	4	"Death at Bargain Prices"	Charles Crichton	Brian Clemens	André Morell, T. P. McKenna, Allan Cuthbertson, George Selway, John Cater, Peter Howell, Ronnie Stevens, Diane Clare	19 October 1965	E.64.10.5
The murder of an agent carrying a receipt from a department store leads Steed to pose as an efficiency expert and Mrs. Emma Peel to join the sales staff, where they stumble upon a sinister plot involving nuclear terrorism.
83	5	"Castle De'ath"	James Hill	John Lucarotti	Gordon Jackson, Robert Urquhart, James Copeland, Jack Lambert, Russell Waters	26 October 1965	E.64.10.15
A Scottish castle with a suspiciously deep moat is the scene for a family feud between the laird and his cousin — and a plot to engineer a fishing crisis. Steed (Jock McSteed) poses as a historian of the 13th laird, and Emma poses as a consultant on turning castles into tourist attractions, to investigate. The chief clue: a room that leads to a dungeon with an iron maiden -- and a rack.
84	6	"The Master Minds"	Peter Graham Scott	Robert Banks Stewart	Bernard Archard, Patricia Haines, Ian MacNaughton, John Wentworth, Georgina Ward Uncredited: Marina Miller, Harvey Hall, Harry Hutchinson, Ray Austin, James Copeland, Elizabeth Reber	2 November 1965	E.64.10.3
After an apparently respectable politician is caught trying to steal top-secret documents, Steed and Emma discover a plot by renegade intellectuals to steal a nuclear missile.
85	7	"The Murder Market"	Peter Graham Scott	Tony Williamson	Patrick Cargill, Suzanne Lloyd, Naomi Chance, Peter Bayliss, John Woodvine, Edward Underdown, Barbara Roscoe, John Forgeham Uncredited: Penelope Keith, A.J. Brown	9 November 1965	E.64.10.2
Steed and Emma pose as eligible singles in order to infiltrate an assassination service posing as a matchmaking agency.
86	8	"A Surfeit of H_{2}O"	Sidney Hayers	Colin Finbow	Noel Purcell, Sue Lloyd, Talfryn Thomas, Albert Lieven, Geoffrey Palmer	16 November 1965	E.64.10.10
After two men are drowned by sudden freak rainstorms, Steed's attention is drawn to a winery under a suspiciously cloudy sky.
87	9	"The Hour That Never Was"	Gerry O'Hara	Roger Marshall	Gerald Harper, Dudley Foster, Roy Kinnear, Roger Booth, David Morrell	23 November 1965	E.64.10.14
After crashing their car while on their way to a farewell party at a military airbase, Steed and Emma find a baffling mystery of stopped clocks, dead milkmen, an abandoned space, and a very suspect dentist.
88	10	"Dial a Deadly Number"	Don Leaver	Roger Marshall	Clifford Evans, Jan Holden, Anthony Newlands, John Carson, Peter Bowles, Gerald Sim, Michael Trubshawe, Norman Chappell, John Bailey, Edward Cast	30 November 1965	E.64.10.4
Steed combats malfeasance in the London financial world, after paged businessmen start dropping dead from heart attacks. His investigation leads him to bankers and brokers with "bleepers," and a creepy "back room" man with a penchant for making devices ... that kill.
89	11	"Man-Eater of Surrey Green"	Sidney Hayers	Philip Levene	Derek Farr, Athene Seyler, Gillian Lewis, David Hutcheson, Joby Blanshard	7 December 1965	E.64.10.12
Steed and Emma encounter their most bizarre enemy yet: a carnivorous alien plant with plans for world domination.
90	12	"Two's A Crowd"	Roy Ward Baker	Philip Levene	Warren Mitchell, Alec Mango, Wolfe Morris, Julian Glover, John Bluthal	14 December 1965	E.64.10.11
An enemy master spy arrives and hires a lookalike of Steed to infiltrate a conference -- or does he?
91	13	"Too Many Christmas Trees"	Roy Ward Baker	Brian Clemens	Mervyn Johns, Edwin Richfield, Jeanette Sterke, Alex Scott, Robert James, Barry Warren	21 December 1965	E.64.10.6
A villainous mastermind is stealing secrets telepathically from the brains of top agents, killing the subjects in the process — and Steed is next on the list. His suspicions increase at the Christmas party of a publisher of the works of Charles Dickens, where the setting and the guests correspond uncannily to Steed's nightmares, much to Emma's alarm.
92	14	"Silent Dust"	Roy Ward Baker	Roger Marshall	William Franklyn, Jack Watson, Conrad Phillips, Norman Bird, Isobel Black, Charles Lloyd-Pack, Aubrey Morris, Robert Dorning	28 December 1965	E.64.10.13
Rural villains hold the British government to ransom with a devastating new biological weapon; our heroes join the hunt.
93	15	"Room Without a View"	Roy Ward Baker	Roger Marshall	Paul Whitsun-Jones, Peter Jeffrey, Richard Bebb, Philip Latham, Peter Arne, Vernon Dobtcheff, Peter Madden	4 January 1966	E.64.10.9
Dr. Wadkin is one of seven scientists to go missing. When he reappears and attacks his wife, the trail leads Steed and Mrs. Emma Peel to a shady tycoon -- and to Room 621 of the Chessman Hotel.
94	16	"Small Game for Big Hunters"	Gerry O'Hara	Philip Levene	Bill Fraser, James Villiers, Liam Redmond, Peter Burton, Paul Danquah, Tom Gill, Peter Thomas	11 January 1966	E.64.10.17
An English tropical jungle harbours a pompous professor, a mad colonel, a war-painted spy, and a bioweapon against an African nation.
95	17	""The Girl from AUNTIE""	Roy Ward Baker	Roger Marshall	Liz Fraser, Alfred Burke, Bernard Cribbins, David Bauer, Mary Merrall, Sylvia Coleridge, Yolande Turner, Maurice Browning	18 January 1966	E.64.10.18
An Emma impersonator and a string of murders put Steed onto the trail of a villainous art dealer.
96	18	"The Thirteenth Hole"	Roy Ward Baker	Tony Williamson	Patrick Allen, Hugh Manning, Peter Jones, Victor Maddern, Francis Matthews, Donald Hewlett, Richard Marner	25 January 1966	E.64.10.16
Death on a golf course brings Steed into a tournament, and Emma into a sand trap, and they light upon a spy ring.
97	19	"Quick Quick Slow Death"	James Hill	Robert Banks Stewart	Eunice Gayson, John Woodnutt, Maurice Kaufmann, Graham Armitage, Alan Gerrard, Michael Peake	1 February 1966	E.64.10.19
A spy's death leads to investigation of a dance school, unattached bachelors, and a tattoo.
98	20	"The Danger Makers"	Charles Crichton	Roger Marshall	Nigel Davenport, Douglas Wilmer, Fabia Drake, Moray Watson, Adrian Ropes, Richard Coleman	8 February 1966	E.64.10.20
Several military officers are engaging in reckless daredevil antics — all part of an unscrupulous psychiatrist's plan to steal the Crown Jewels.
99	21	"A Touch of Brimstone"	James Hill	Brian Clemens	Peter Wyngarde, Carol Cleveland, Colin Jeavons, Jeremy Young, Steve Plytas, Alf Joint, Robert Cawdron	15 February 1966	E.64.10.21
Steed investigates -- and joins -- an eccentric band of libertines (called the Hellfire Club) who commit deadly practical jokes on public figures ... but they are soon revealed to have much bigger plans in mind.
100	22	"What the Butler Saw"	Bill Bain	Brian Clemens	Denis Quilley, John Le Mesurier, Thorley Walters, Kynaston Reeves, Howard Marion-Crawford, Humphrey Lestocq, Ewan Hooper	22 February 1966	E.64.10.22
Steed enlists at a butler training school to find out who is selling military secrets to the enemy.
101	23	"The House That Jack Built"	Don Leaver	Brian Clemens	Michael Goodliffe, Keith Pyott, Griffith Davies	1 March 1966	E.64.10.23
Mrs. Emma Peel inherits an electronic key to the house of her late, unknown uncle — and finds herself trapped in a maze, the target of a former employee's mind-bending revenge.
102	24	"A Sense of History"	Peter Graham Scott	Martin Woodhouse	Nigel Stock, John Barron, John Glyn-Jones, John Ringham, Patrick Mower, Robin Phillips, Peter Blythe, Peter Bourne, Jacqueline Pearce	8 March 1966	E.64.10.24
Steed and Mrs. Emma Peel investigate an assassination plot among a university's boisterously merry men.
103	25	"How to Succeed ....at Murder"	Don Leaver	Brian Clemens	Sarah Lawson, Angela Browne, Jerome Willis, Christopher Benjamin, Kevin Brennan, David Garth	15 March 1966	E.64.10.25
Efficient, militant, physically fit and bespangled secretaries are assassinating key businessmen – but who's behind the curtain?
104	26	"Honey for the Prince"	James Hill	Brian Clemens	Ron Moody, Zia Mohyeddin, George Pastell, Roland Curram, Bruno Barnabe, Jon Laurimore, Peter Diamond, Ken Parry, Richard Graydon, Reg Pritchard	22 March 1966	E.64.10.26
A genie brings Steed and Emma to a fantasy world of cricket, harem dances, and creative assassination.

Starting with this series, the production budget was increased considerably, and location shooting was used extensively. With an eye toward getting the series shown on US television, the show was now shot using 35mm film instead of being videotaped, leading to an increase in picture quality. This brought The Avengers in line with other contemporary ITV series such as Danger Man (airing in the US as Secret Agent) and The Saint.

Actress Elizabeth Shepherd was originally cast as Emma Peel; one complete episode, "The Town of No Return", was filmed. Partway through filming of the second episode, "The Murder Market", the producers closed down production in order to recast the part. The Shepherd footage has never been televised and is believed to be lost. Canal+ once claimed it had the original footage, and then later retracted this claim. Publicity photos of Elizabeth Shepherd as Mrs. Emma Peel survive.

For American broadcast, all episodes of the 1965–1966 series included a specially-shot prologue preceding the main credits, showing Steed and Mrs. Emma Peel walking across a giant chessboard while a narrator introduces the characters and the concept of the series. This opening never aired in the UK and wasn't widely seen in the show's home country until the DVD release.

The closing credits of all episodes of the fourth series credit the production company as "Associated British Productions Limited", the name of ABC Weekend's parent company's film production wing in Elstree, but at the very end, the triangular logo of ABC Weekend TV appears with the caption "ABC production", as in previous series.

"The Strange Case of the Missing Corpse" was filmed in colour on the set of "Honey for the Prince" and was, as Brian Clemens originally wrote it, intended to be tagged on to the end of the final b/w episode transmitted in America to advertise the upcoming colour episodes (though the b/w sequence titled "Preamble for USA", written by Brian Clemens to introduce the item, which was to have featured Patrick Macnee and Diana Rigg explaining/introducing this short colour test film, is either lost or was never filmed). It was also cut down into a trailer for the colour episodes coming soon to ABC Network in America. Just like the prologue to the b/w Macnee/Rigg episodes, it was never meant to be screened anywhere but the US. There is a myth that it was to have originally been a twenty-minute mini-episode, but the version presently available on video is three minutes long and doesn't appear to be missing any substantial narrative content.

== Series 5 (1967) ==
Cast: This series featured Patrick Macnee (as John Steed) and Diana Rigg (as Emma Peel). From this series onwards, all episodes were filmed in colour, but as ITV did not begin colour transmissions until November 1969, all were originally broadcast in the UK in black and white.

Production of this series occurred in two batches. The first 16 episodes were broadcast in both the UK and the US from January to May 1967. The remaining 8 episodes were broadcast in the UK as a continuation of the fifth series from September to November 1967, but in the US they were delayed until January 1968 where they formed the first half of a new season.

=== January to May ===
Nº	Ep	Title	Directed by	Written by	Guest cast	First UK broadcast	US air date (Note: WABC-TV, New York)	Prod. code	US Ep
105	1	"From Venus with Love"	Robert Day	Philip Levene	Barbara Shelley, Philip Locke, Jon Pertwee, Derek Newark, Jeremy Lloyd, Adrian Ropes, Arthur Cox, Paul Gillard, Kenneth Benda, Michael Lynch	9 January 1967; Southern 14 January, ABC	20 January 1967	E.66.6.4	2–1
Astronomers studying the planet Venus are being killed, by what appears to be a death-ray, as Steed and Mrs. Emma Peel investigate reports of an invasion from space.
106	2	"The Fear Merchants"	Gordon Flemyng	Philip Levene	Patrick Cargill, Brian Wilde, Garfield Morgan, Annette Carell, Andrew Keir, Jeremy Burnham, Edward Burnham, Bernard Horsfall, Ruth Trouncer, Declan Mulholland	16 January 1967; Southern 21 January, ABC	27 January 1967	E.66.6.1	2–2
Executives in the ceramics industry are driven out of their minds with fear at the behest of a competitor, by the application of science.
107	3	"Escape in Time"	John Krish	Philip Levene	Peter Bowles, Geoffrey Bayldon, Judy Parfitt, Imogen Hassall, Nicholas Smith, Clifford Earl, Edward Caddick	23 January 1967; Southern 28 January, ABC	10 February 1967	E.66.6.2	2–4
An organisation is apparently sending criminals into the past to escape arrest.
108	4	"The See-Through Man"	Robert Asher	Philip Levene	Warren Mitchell, Moira Lister, Roy Kinnear, Jonathan Elsom, John Nettleton, Harvey Hall	30 January 1967; Southern 4 February, ABC	3 February 1967	E.66.6.5	2–3
A Russian spymaster seemingly purchases the secret of invisibility from an eccentric English scientist, in order to penetrate British security.
109	5	"The Bird Who Knew Too Much"	Roy Rossotti	Brian Clemens	Ron Moody, Ilona Rodgers, Kenneth Cope, Michael Coles, John Wood, Anthony Valentine, John Lee	8 February 1967; Southern 11 February, ABC	10 March 1967	E.66.6.3	2–7
Steed and Emma chase a missing parrot that holds a clue to Soviet espionage activities.
110	6	"The Winged Avenger"	Peter Duffell, Gordon Flemyng	Richard Harris	Nigel Green, Jack MacGowran, Neil Hallett, Colin Jeavons, John Garrie, Donald Pickering, William Fox, Ann Sidney, Roy Patrick	15 February 1967; Southern 18 February, ABC	17 February 1967	E.66.6.6	2–5
A comic book character is brought to life to commit murder, killing a number of men in the publishing industry – by walking up walls.
111	7	"The Living Dead"	John Krish	Brian Clemens	Julian Glover, Pamela Ann Davy, Howard Marion-Crawford, Jack Woolgar, Jack Watson, Edward Underdown, John Cater, Vernon Dobtcheff, Alister Williamson	22 February 1967; Southern 25 February, ABC	3 March 1967	E.66.6.7	2–6
The late Duke of Benedict, who perished in a mining disaster, returns to haunt a sleepy English village -- but is he really dead?
112	8	"The Hidden Tiger"	Sidney Hayers	Philip Levene	Ronnie Barker, Lyndon Brook, Gabrielle Drake, John Phillips, Stanley Meadows, Jack Gwillim, Frederick Treves, Reg Pritchard	1 March 1967; Southern 4 March, ABC	17 March 1967	E.66.6.8	2–8
Men and animals are being mauled to death in rural England by what seems to be a tiger or puma -- but no one who sees it lives to tell the tale.
113	9	"The Correct Way to Kill"	Charles Crichton	Brian Clemens	Anna Quayle, Michael Gough, Philip Madoc, Terence Alexander, Peter Barkworth, Graham Armitage, Timothy Bateson, Edwin Apps	8 March 1967; Southern 11 March, ABC	24 March 1967	E.66.6.9	2–9
Seeking an organisation of murderous City gents, who are assassinating both British and enemy agents, Steed gets a glamorous but tall Russian partner, and Emma a short-lived one.
114	10	"Never, Never Say Die"	Robert Day	Philip Levene	Christopher Lee, Jeremy Young, Patricia English, David Kernan, Christopher Benjamin, John Junkin, Peter Dennis, Arnold Ridley, Alan Chuntz	15 March 1967; Southern 18 March, ABC	31 March 1967	E.66.6.10	2–10
A motorist finds that wherever he goes he's involved in yet another traffic accident, repeatedly killing the same pedestrian – Dr. Frank N. Stone (Christopher Lee).
115	11	"Epic"	James Hill	Brian Clemens	Peter Wyngarde, Isa Miranda, Kenneth J. Warren, David Lodge	29 March 1967; Tyne Tees 1 April, ABC	14 April 1967	E.66.6.11	2–11
A demented movie mogul with an Erich von Stroheim fixation lures Mrs. Emma Peel to an abandoned movie studio, to star in a film of her own death.
116	12	"The Superlative Seven"	Sidney Hayers	Brian Clemens	Charlotte Rampling, Brian Blessed, James Maxwell, Hugh Manning, Leon Greene, Donald Sutherland, John Hollis	5 April 1967; Tyne Tees 8 April, ABC	21 April 1967	E.66.6.12	2–12
A mysterious invitation that strands him on a remote island, with six companions who are murdered one by one, makes Steed a Little Indian.
117	13	"A Funny Thing Happened on the Way to the Station"	John Krish	Brian Clemens	James Hayter, John Laurie, Drewe Henley, Isla Blair, Tim Barrett, Richard Caldicot, Dyson Lovell, Michael Nightingale	12 April 1967; Tyne Tees 15 April, ABC	28 April 1967	E.66.6.13	2–13
In a spoof of the movie "The Lady Vanishes", a bride and groom keep catching the same railway train, to a station that doesn't exist. Steed starts to suspect that a novel espionage network is being created when the agent following them vanishes.
118	14	"Something Nasty in the Nursery"	James Hill	Philip Levene	Dudley Foster, Yootha Joyce, Paul Eddington, Clive Dunn, Patrick Newell, Trevor Bannister, Paul Hardwick, Dennis Chinnery	21 April 1967; Rediffusion 22 April, ABC	5 May 1967	E.66.6.14	2–14
Government ministers suddenly revert to childhood, when exposed to a new type of nerve gas.
119	15	"The Joker"	Sidney Hayers	Brian Clemens	Peter Jeffrey, Ronald Lacey, John Stone	26 April 1967; Tyne Tees 29 April, ABC	12 May 1967	E.66.6.15	2–15
Mrs. Emma Peel is lured to a big, lonely country house by a man who wants revenge.
120	16	"Who's Who ???"	John Llewellyn Moxey	Philip Levene	Freddie Jones, Patricia Haines, Campbell Singer, Peter Reynolds, Arnold Diamond, Malcolm Taylor	3 May 1967; Tyne Tees 6 May, ABC	19 May 1967	E.66.6.16	2–16
A pair of assassins changing their minds (for Steed's and Emma's) bring double trouble.

"The Fear Merchants" was the first episode of The Avengers to be produced/filmed in colour, although "From Venus with Love" aired first.

The closing credits of all episodes of the fifth and sixth series credit the production company as "A.B.C. Television Films Limited", and at the very end an animation reveals the letters "ABC" to stand for "Associated British Corporation", a name apparently invented for ABC shows exported to the US to avoid confusion with the US ABC network.

=== September to November ===
Nº	Ep	Title	Directed by	Written by	Guest cast	First UK broadcast	US air date	Prod. code	US Ep
121	17	"Return of the Cybernauts"	Robert Day	Philip Levene	Peter Cushing, Frederick Jaeger, Charles Tingwell, Fulton Mackay, Roger Hammond, Noel Coleman, Aimi MacDonald, Redmond Phillips	27 September 1967; Grampian 30 September, ABC	21 February 1968	E.66.6.18	3–6
Scientists are being kidnapped. Mrs. Emma Peel is to be the next victim after she receives a new wristwatch that the Cybernauts can home-in on, from a deceitful admirer.
122	18	"Death's Door"	Sidney Hayers	Philip Levene	Clifford Evans, Allan Cuthbertson, William Lucas, Marne Maitland, Peter Thomas	4 October 1967; Grampian 7 October, ABC	31 January 1968	E.66.6.17	3–4
Top civil servants are manipulated into believing that if they go through the door to a vital conference, they will die.
123	19	"The £50,000 Breakfast"	Robert Day	Roger Marshall	Cecil Parker, Yolande Turner, David Langton, Anneke Wills, Cardew Robinson, Nigel Lambert, Jon Laurimore	11 October 1967; Grampian 14 October, ABC	28 February 1968	E.66.6.20	3–7
A Switzerland-bound ventriloquist in a coma has a bellyful of diamonds. This is a remake of episode 2.08, 'Death of a Great Dane'.
124	20	"Dead Man's Treasure"	Sidney Hayers	Michael Winder	Arthur Lowe, Valerie Van Ost, Edwin Richfield, Neil McCarthy, Norman Bowler, Ivor Dean, Rio Fanning	18 October 1967; Grampian 21 October, ABC	13 March 1968	E.66.6.19	3–8
A missing briefcase full of secrets propels Steed and Emma into a treasure hunt by car.
125	21	"You Have Just Been Murdered"	Robert Asher	Philip Levene	Barrie Ingham, Robert Flemyng, George Murcell, Leslie French, Geoffrey Chater, Simon Oates, Frank Maher, Clifford Cox, John Baker	25 October 1967; Grampian 28 October, ABC	24 January 1968	E.66.6.21	3–3
Millionaires are being blackmailed into paying a mystery enemy not to murder them, as he repeatedly demonstrates how vulnerable to assassination they are.
126	22	"The Positive Negative Man"	Robert Day	Tony Williamson	Ray McAnally, Michael Latimer, Caroline Blakiston, Peter Blythe, Sandor Elès, Bill Wallis	1 November 1967 Grampian 4 November, ABC	17 January 1968	E.66.6.22	3–2
Scientists are being eliminated by a highly charged hitman, whose touch brings instant death by electrocution.
127	23	"Murdersville"	Robert Asher	Brian Clemens	Colin Blakely, John Ronane, Ronald Hines, John Sharp, Sheila Fearn, Eric Flynn, Norman Chappell, Tony Caunter, John Chandos, Robert Cawdron, Joseph Greig, Geoffrey Colville	8 November 1967; Grampian 11 November, ABC	7 February 1968	E.66.6.23	3–5
A childhood chum of Mrs. Emma Peel's retires to a quiet, friendly little English village – that is now the headquarters of Murder Incorporated.
128	24	"Mission... Highly Improbable"	Robert Day	Philip Levene	Ronald Radd, Jane Merrow, Noel Howlett, Francis Matthews, Richard Leech, Stefan Gryff, Nicholas Courtney, Kevin Stoney, Nosher Powell	15 November 1967; Grampian 18 November, ABC	10 January 1968	E.66.6.24	3–1
In a spoof of Mission: Impossible, a new ray machine, which makes everything smaller, miniaturises Steed!

== Series 6 (1968–1969) ==
Cast: All episodes feature Patrick Macnee (as John Steed) and Linda Thorson (as Tara King). In episode 17 ("Killer"), Tara makes a brief appearance before going on holiday. For the remainder of "Killer", Patrick Macnee as John Steed is paired with Jennifer Croxton as Lady Diana Forbes-Blakeney.

In episode 1 ("The Forget-Me-Knot"), Diana Rigg as Emma Peel makes her final appearance.

Patrick Newell (as "Mother") features in twenty of the episodes, with his mute sidekick "Rhonda" (Rhonda Parker) joining him for the latter eighteen.

The episode numbers in the table relate to the order in which they were first broadcast by Thames Television in the UK. Different ITV regions broadcast episodes on different dates and in different orders, so the Thames order does not match the order of first UK broadcast. Nearly all episodes in this series were shown, in a different order, in the US before they were shown in the UK.

Nº	Ep	Title	Directed by	Written by	Guest cast	First UK broadcast	US air date	Prod. code	US Ep
129	1	"The Forget-Me-Knot"	James Hill	Brian Clemens	Patrick Kavanagh, Jeremy Burnham, Jeremy Young, Alan Lake, Douglas Sheldon, John Lee, Leon Lissek	25 September 1968; Thames	20 March 1968	E.66.6.25	3–9
A new drug that causes instant amnesia makes his fellow agents forget Steed. Diana Rigg bows out as Mrs. Emma Peel and her replacement, Miss Tara King (Linda Thorson), is introduced (the two women pass each other on the stairs, and Mrs. Emma Peel advises Tara King about how to prepare Steed's tea), together with Steed's new boss: a plump, jovial man, code-named 'Mother' (who, in a spoof of the US television series "Ironside", runs the department from his wheelchair).
130	2	"Game"	Robert Fuest	Richard Harris	Peter Jeffrey, Garfield Morgan, Anthony Newlands, Alex Scott, Aubrey Richards, Brian Badcoe	2 October 1968; Thames	23 September 1968	E.67.9.11	4–1
An ex-soldier, thought to be dead, takes his revenge on Steed and five other former Army officers who helped to court-martial him, by trapping them into participating in a series of deadly games that invariably end in death.
131	3	"Super Secret Cypher Snatch"	John Hough	Tony Williamson	John Carlisle, Simon Oates, Allan Cuthbertson, Ivor Dean, Angela Scoular, Nicholas Smith, David Quilter, Clifford Earl, Donald Gee, Alec Ross, Lionel Wheeler	9 October 1968; Thames	30 September 1968	E.67.9.10	4–2
An espionage ring is stealing secrets from the Government's top secret Cypher HQ, by posing as window cleaners. MI-12 is assigned to the case. When its man Jarett is murdered, Steed takes over, to investigate Classy Glass Cleaning -- but Tara, posing as a new secretary inside Cypher HQ, swears no one has penetrated its security.
132	4	"You'll Catch Your Death"	Paul Dickson	Jeremy Burnham	Ronald Culver, Valentine Dyall, Fulton Mackay, Sylvia Kay, Dudley Sutton, Charles Lloyd-Pack, Henry McGee, Hamilton Dyce, Bruno Barnabe, Geoffrey Chater, Jennifer Clulow, Willoughby Gray	16 October 1968; Thames	7 October 1968	E.67.9.9	4–3
Empty envelopes are delivered to top Government officials, who are then found dead. The only clue is that each man seems to have died from a fit of sneezing. Steed investigates a clinic for researching the common cold, which seems to have purchased some unusual stationery supplies.
133	5	"Split!"	Roy Ward Baker	Brian Clemens	Nigel Davenport, Julian Glover, Bernard Archard, Iain Anders, Christopher Benjamin, Steven Scott, Maurice Good	23 October 1968; Thames	10 April 1968	E.66.6.28 / E.67.9.2	3–12
When agents in Lord Barnes's department at the Ministry of Top Secret Information are murdered, all the evidence points to an enemy agent named Kartovski. The snag is that Kartovski was killed by Steed five years earlier.
134	6	"Whoever Shot Poor George Oblique Stroke XR40?"	Cyril Frankel	Tony Williamson	Dennis Price, Clifford Evans, Judy Parfitt, Anthony Nicholls, Frank Windsor, Adrian Ropes, Arthur Cox, Tony Wright, Valerie Leon	17 October 1968; Ulster 30 October, Thames	9 December 1968	E.67.9.7	4–10
A mystery enemy is targeting Britain's most important government computer with a series of sabotage attempts. Steed investigates the machine's designer, following up a clue the computer has provided, and plants Tara in his household as a spy.
135	7	"False Witness"	Charles Crichton	Jeremy Burnham	John Bennett, Barry Warren, Tony Steedman, Simon Lack, Arthur Pentelow, Jimmy Gardner, Rio Fanning	6 November 1968; Thames	25 November 1968	E.67.9.12	4–8
When all the witnesses involved in the prosecution of Lord Edgefield, suspected of blackmailing key security and foreign service personnel, suddenly start lying – including Tara – Steed must discover how they have been got at. Meanwhile, Tara becomes suspicious of DreemyKreem Dairies, but discovers she is literally incapable of telling anyone.
136	8	"All Done with Mirrors"	Ray Austin	Leigh Vance	Dinsdale Landen, Peter Copley, Edwin Richfield, Michael Trubshawe, Nora Nicholson, Tenniel Evans, Michael Nightingale, Robert Sidaway, Edina Ronay (uncredited), David Grey, Graham Ashley, Peter Thomas	13 November 1968; Thames	2 December 1968	E.67.9.8	4–9
Secrets are leaking from a defence research establishment, thanks to a new invention: an eavesdropping device, which can use any shiny surface to reflect and amplify sound waves. But with Steed unavailable, Tara King must investigate with only an inexperienced new agent for support.
137	9	"Legacy of Death"	Don Chaffey	Terry Nation	Stratford Johns, Ronald Lacey, Richard Hurndall, John Hollis, Tutte Lemkow, Michael Bilton	20 November 1968; Thames	4 November 1968	E.67.9.14	4–5
For revenge on Steed, an old enemy leaves him a deadly legacy in his will: a jewelled oriental dagger worth a million dollars, known as the Falcon, which various dangerous men are anxious to acquire. Steed is cast in the role of Sam Spade, in a spoof of The Maltese Falcon, with dead bodies piling up in his apartment as one man after another tries to kill him to get hold of the item. Ronald Lacey guest stars as Mr. Green, and Stratford Johns as Mr. Street, in a homage to Humphrey Bogart's co-star, Sydney Greenstreet.
138	10	"Noon Doomsday"	Peter Sykes	Terry Nation	T. P. McKenna, Ray Brooks, Griffith Jones, Lyndon Brook, Peter Bromilow, Patrick Newell, Peter Halliday, Anthony Ainley, John Glyn-Jones	27 November 1968; Thames	28 October 1968	E.67.9.13	4–4
An injured Steed is being treated in a top secret hospital, with an assassin named Kafka, the former head of Murder International, on his trail. With the aid of an accomplice on the inside, Kafka penetrates the security guarding the hospital, and Tara finds herself in a race against time to save the helpless Steed.
139	11	"Look — (Stop Me If You've Heard This One) — But There Were These Two Fellers..."	James Hill	Dennis Spooner	Jimmy Jewel, Julian Chagrin, Bernard Cribbins, John Cleese, William Kendall, John Woodvine, Garry Marsh, Gaby Vargas, Bill Shine, Robert James, Talfryn Thomas	4 December 1968; Thames	8 May 1968	E.66.6.31 / E.67.9.5	3–15
Two old-time music hall performers dressed as clowns (one played by real-life music hall star Jimmy Jewel), with assistance from a group of ex-vaudeville acts, are killing the businessmen they blame for closing down the variety theatres which were their livelihood.
140	12	"Have Guns — Will Haggle"	Ray Austin	Donald James	Johnny Sekka, Nicola Pagett, Roy Stewart, Timothy Bateson, Michael Turner, Jonathan Burn	11 December 1968; Thames	1 May 1968	E.66.6.30 / E.67.9.4	3–14
Steed attends an underworld auction and bids for three thousand stolen state-of-the art rifles to try to prevent them falling into the wrong hands.
141	13	"They Keep Killing Steed"	Robert Fuest	Brian Clemens	Ian Ogilvy, Ray McAnally, Norman Jones, Bernard Horsfall, Angharad Rees, Reg Whitehead	18 December 1968; Thames	11 November 1968	E.67.9.15	4–6
Enemy agents disguised as Steed penetrate a peace conference for which he is in charge of security, to assassinate the delegates. With Steed also present, trying to stop them, chaos arrives because no one can tell the real Steed from the imposters. As Tara investigates, she finds herself falling over dead Steeds wherever she goes!
142	14	"The Interrogators"	Charles Crichton	Richard Harris, Brian Clemens	Christopher Lee, Philip Bond, Glynn Edwards, Neil McCarthy, Cardew Robinson, Neil Wilson	1 January 1969; Thames	20 January 1969	E.67.9.19	4–14
Agents in Steed's department are being fooled into giving away secrets, by men posing as Army officers at a fake Government training establishment -- and their next victim will be ... Tara King.
143	15	"The Rotters"	Robert Fuest	Dave Freeman	Gerald Sim, Jerome Willis, Eric Barker, John Nettleton, Frank Middlemass, Harold Innocent, Amy Dalby, John Stone, Charles Morgan, Noel Davis	8 January 1969; Thames	16 December 1968	E.67.9.18	4–11
Steed investigates a firm named WormDoom, whose proprietor, a businessman widely thought a bit of a rotter, is killing off his business competitors, all experts on timber decay. To get at his victims, he has stolen a new chemical that, while simulating dry rot, causes wood to rot instantaneously: turning doors, walls and windows all to powder.
144	16	"Invasion of the Earthmen"	Don Sharp	Terry Nation	William Lucas, Christian Roberts, Lucy Fleming, Wendy Allnutt, Chris Chittell, Warren Clarke, George Roubicek	15 January 1969; Thames	27 March 1968	E.66.6.26	3–10
Steed and Tara investigate an unusual school: a military academy for young men and women, that hides a secret astronaut training centre.
145	17	"Killer"	Cliff Owen	Tony Williamson	Jennifer Croxton, Grant Taylor, William Franklyn, Richard Wattis, Harry Towb, John Bailey, Michael Ward, James Bree, Anthony Valentine, Clive Graham, Oliver MacGreevy, Michael McStay	22 January 1969; Thames	30 December 1968	E.67.9.17	4–12
While Tara is on leave, Steed takes on a temporary new partner, the aristocratic Lady Diana Forbes-Blakeney. Together they confront REMAK: the Remote Electro Matic Agent Killer – a computerised assassin.
146	18	"The Morning After"	John Hough	Brian Clemens	Peter Barkworth, Joss Ackland, Brian Blessed, Donald Douglas	10 January 1969; ATV 29 January, Thames	27 January 1969	67.9.20	4–15
A double-agent, codenamed Merlin, steals a new sleep gas and tries it out on Steed. Awaking 24 hours later, with Merlin his prisoner, Steed can find no one to hand him over to: everywhere he goes the streets are completely deserted.
147	19	"The Curious Case of the Countless Clues"	Don Sharp	Philip Levene	Anthony Bate, Kenneth Cope, Tony Selby, Peter Jones, Tracy Reed, Edward de Souza, George A. Cooper, Reginald Jessup	31 January 1969; ATV 5 February, Thames	3 April 1968	E.66.6.27 / E.67.9.1	3–11
In a spoof of Sherlock Holmes, Sir Arthur Doyle (Peter Jones) – equipped with pipe, cape and deerstalker hat – is investigating a seemingly careless criminal, who leaves masses of clues wherever he goes ... but no one can solve the crimes, not even Steed, because all the clues are fakes: left behind by a blackmailer, who is planting them to incriminate wealthy men, as part of a sophisticated extortion racket.
148	20	"Wish You Were Here"	Don Chaffey	Tony Williamson	Liam Redmond, Robert Urquhart, Brook Williams, Dudley Foster, Derek Newark, Gary Watson, Louise Pajo, Richard Caldicot, David Garth	7 February 1969; ATV 12 February, Thames	18 November 1968	E.67.9.16	4–7
In a spoof of The Prisoner, Tara finds herself trapped in a posh prison without bars or guards, which, on the surface, appears to be merely an elegant hotel in a quiet English town.
149	21	"Love All"	Peter Sykes	Jeremy Burnham	Terence Alexander, Patsy Rowlands, Brian Oulton, Frank Gatliff, Peter Stephens, Larry Taylor, David Baron	14 February 1969; ATV 19 February, Thames	3 February 1969	E.67.9.21	4–16
Steed investigates a publishing house which specialises in romantic fiction, when looking into a mystery in which top civil servants are unexpectedly falling in love and betraying military secrets in 'pillow talk'.
150	22	"Stay Tuned"	Don Chaffey	Tony Williamson	Gary Bond, Kate O'Mara, Duncan Lamont, Howard Marion-Crawford, Roger Delgado, Harold Kasket, Ewan Roberts	21 February 1969; ATV 26 February, Thames	24 February 1969	E.67.9.23	4–19
Steed returns from holiday with no memory of where he has been or what he has been doing for the past three weeks. He is behaving oddly and seems to have been brainwashed -— implanted with a post-hypnotic suggestion to kill someone in the department.
151	23	"Take Me to Your Leader"	Robert Fuest	Terry Nation	Patrick Barr, John Ronane, Michael Robbins, Penelope Keith, Hugh Cross, Michael Hawkins, Bryan Kendrick, Raymond Adamson, Henry Stamper	28 February 1969; ATV 5 March, Thames	10 February 1969	E.67.9.22	4–17
Steed and Tara are tracking the movements of a red attaché case containing money and documents intended for a top enemy agent. The case also contains taped messages that inform a series of couriers where to take it.
152	24	"Fog"	John Hough	Jeremy Burnham	Nigel Green, Guy Rolfe, Terence Brady, Paul Whitsun-Jones, Norman Chappell, Patsy Smart, John Garrie, Frederick Peisley, Arnold Diamond, John Barrard	7 March 1969; ATV 12 March, Thames	17 February 1969	E.67.9.24	4–18
The Gaslight Ghoul, a Victorian mass murderer similar to Jack the Ripper, strikes again a century later. In a fog-shrouded London, the Ghoul is intent on assassinating all the foreign delegates attending the international disarmament conference. Steed invents a fictitious additional Gaslight Ghoul murder in order to investigate a gentlemen's club, dedicated to uncovering the identity of the Ghoul, which Steed suspects is involved in the new killings.
153	25	"Who Was That Man I Saw You With?"	Don Chaffey	Jeremy Burnham	William Marlowe, Ralph Michael, Alan MacNaughtan, Alan Wheatley, Bryan Marshall, Alan Browning, Aimée Delamain, Ken Barker	14 March 1969; ATV 19 March, Thames	3 March 1969	E.67.9.25	4–20
Whilst on a top-secret security assignment, Tara comes under suspicion of being a double agent. She must cast similar suspicion on Steed if she is to prove that she has been framed. An enemy agent, Gregor Zaroff, hopes to put the Government's new anti-missile defence system, codenamed 'Field Marshall', out of action by convincing Steed and Mother that Tara has betrayed the system's secrets.
154	26	"Homicide and Old Lace"	John Hough	Malcolm Hulke, Terrance Dicks	Joyce Carey, Mary Merrall, Gerald Harper, Keith Baxter, Edward Brayshaw, Bryan Mosley, Donald Pickering, Gertan Klauber, Kevork Malikyan, Kristopher Kum, Stephen Hubay	21 March 1969; ATV 26 March, Thames	17 March 1969	E.66.6.32 / E.67.9.27	4–22
Mother's two elderly aunties are all a-twitter over an improbable tale that he spins them: a dastardly plot to steal the Crown Jewels, illustrated with clips from earlier episodes.
155	27	"Thingumajig"	Leslie Norman	Terry Nation	Jeremy Lloyd, Iain Cuthbertson, Willoughby Goddard, Hugh Manning, John Horsley, Edward Burnham, Vernon Dobtcheff, Russell Waters	28 March 1969; ATV 2 April, Thames	24 March 1969	E.67.9.28	4–23
A fiendish, and lethal device that eats electricity, designed as the ultimate killing machine, gets loose in a rural English village and electrocutes everyone it comes into contact with.
156	28	"My Wildest Dream"	Robert Fuest	Philip Levene	Peter Vaughan, Derek Godfrey, Edward Fox, Susan Travers, Philip Madoc, Tom Kempinski, John Savident, Hugh Moxey	4 April 1969; Border 7 April, Thames	6 January 1969	E.67.9.6	4–13
Acme Precision Combine's directors are dying. A series of quite ordinary men have been hypnotised into committing the murders—by making them believe it's all a dream.
157	29	"Requiem"	Don Chaffey	Brian Clemens	Angela Douglas, John Cairney, John Paul, Denis Shaw, Katya Wyeth, John Baker	11 April 1969; ATV 16 April, Thames	31 March 1969	E.67.9.29	4–24
Tara finds herself attending a Requiem service for Mother, when Steed inaugurates a one-man witness protection scheme for a key witness against Murder International: taking the witness to Fort Steed, a hiding place supposedly known only to him. However, agents bent on murdering the witness boobytrap Steed's apartment. When the bomb explodes, Tara is severely injured and Mother is killed. Now Tara must find Steed in time to warn him.
158	30	"Take-Over"	Robert Fuest	Terry Nation	Tom Adams, Elizabeth Sellars, Michael Gwynn, Hilary Pritchard, Garfield Morgan, Keith Buckley, John Comer, Anthony Sagar	18 April 1969; ATV 23 April, Thames	14 April 1969	E.67.9.30	4–25
Steed is spending the weekend with two of his oldest friends, Bill and Laura Bassett, who, unknown to him, are being held prisoner in their own home by the other house guests. If they reveal this to Steed, or the reason why, he will be murdered: but he nevertheless begins to suspect something is amiss. Then an unsuspecting Tara blunders in.
159	31	"Pandora"	Robert Fuest	Brian Clemens	Julian Glover, James Cossins, Kathleen Byron, John Laurie, Geoffrey Whitehead, Peter Madden, Reginald Barratt	4 April 1969; ATV 30 April, Thames	10 March 1969	E.67.9.26	4–21
Tara is kidnapped by two brothers, who drug her and seek to brainwash her into believing that she is Pandora, a young woman she closely resembles, who was once engaged to their elderly father—a retired spy, codenamed the "Fierce Rabbit". He had been a British agent in the First World War, and Tara has to be convinced that she is now living in the year 1915.
160	32	"Get-a-Way!"	Don Sharp	Philip Levene	Andrew Keir, Peter Bowles, Peter Bayliss, Terence Longdon, Michael Culver, Michael Elwyn, Robert Russell, William Wilde	27 December 1968; Yorkshire 14 May 1969, Thames	24 April 1968	E.66.6.29 / E.67.9.27	3–13
Three captured Russian spies, one of whom is assigned to assassinate Steed, escape from a seemingly escape-proof prison hidden in Oldhill Monastery. Steed investigates a suspicious consignment of vodka recently delivered there, while Tara finds a clue in a magazine article about camouflage.
161	33	"Bizarre"	Leslie Norman	Brian Clemens	Roy Kinnear, Fulton Mackay, George Innes, John Sharp, Sheila Burrell, Michael Balfour, Patrick Connor, Ron Pember	17 May 1969; Yorkshire 21 May, Thames	21 April 1969	E.67.9.31	4–26
When a man who was buried a year previously is found newly dead, Steed investigates the cemetery where the dead man was supposed to be. One exhumation leads to another, as more and more discrepancies are uncovered. Steed then has himself buried alive — to see what transpires.

John Bryce replaced Brian Clemens and Albert Fennell as producer for the start of series six. By the time Brian Clemens and Albert Fennell returned, three episodes had been filmed: two 90-minute episodes, named "Invitation To a Killing" and "The Great Great Britain Crime", as well as a standard-length episode, "Invasion of the Earthmen". These were considered to be extremely flawed episodes; they would likely have been scrapped, except that time did not exist in which to film new episodes and still meet the American contract. Hence, "Invitation To a Killing" was heavily edited and had several new shots filmed to become "Have Guns — Will Haggle", while "The Great Great Britain Crime" was heavily edited and had some old footage from previous episodes added, as well as some new footage, to become "Homicide and Old Lace". "Invasion of the Earthmen" was slightly edited as well. No known copies of the original versions of these episodes exist.

This series was produced in two batches: seven episodes (mostly without Patrick Newell as "Mother", and none with Rhonda Parker as "Rhonda") were added to the last eight Diana Rigg episodes for broadcast in the US in the spring of 1968: this made up the third series on ABC in America. On the original American broadcasts, these episodes featured the original 'Shooting Gallery' opening/closing titles featuring Tara in a tight-fitting tan outfit with a short skirt, and gunshots as Steed and Tara are shot at by an unseen gunman, which was filmed by Harry Booth. The seven episodes that aired in the US in the spring of 1968 aired in the following order:

1. 20 March The Forget-Me-Knot
2. 27 March Invasion of the Earthmen
3. 3 April The Curious Case of the Countless Clues
4. 10 April Split!
5. 24 April Get-A-Way
6. 1 May Have Guns — will Haggle
7. 8 May Look- (Stop Me If You've Heard This One) But There Were These Two Fellers..."

These seven episodes were added sporadically into the 26 episodes produced in the next block, and the whole was transmitted in Britain as a single 33-episode run. The standard title sequences, the 'field/suits of armour' opening and 'playing card' ending, were filmed by Robert Fuest, originally for the first US transmission of the final 26 episodes, which made up the fourth series on the ABC network in America. These ones were tacked on to all 33 episodes when broadcast in the UK, apart from "The Forget-Me-Knot" which retained the amended Emma Peel opening credits and its original Tara King 'Shooting Gallery' end credit sequence.

By the time the sixth series came to be broadcast in the UK, ABC Weekend TV had ceased to exist: it had merged with Rediffusion London to become Thames Television. However all episodes of this series were still credited to A.B.C. Television Films as had the previous series.

Notes:

- In the episode "Killer", Tara King is only seen departing for and returning from holiday. Steed's fellow agent for this episode is Lady Diana Forbes-Blakeney (played by Jennifer Croxton).
- In the US, the field/suits of armour opening title sequence was re-edited to 23 seconds (the UK sequence runs 49 seconds), to accommodate more commercials.
- The original 1968 German-dubbed episodes of this series had the field/suits of armour opening titles, but the 'Shooting Gallery' end titles.
- The original 1968 French-dubbed episodes of this series featured a variant in the opening title music: a gunshot sound is heard during the shot of Tara King running between two rows of suits of armour toward Steed, and the sound of the sword swipe at the beginning is missing.
- The original title music for the opening 'Shooting Gallery' sequence featured gunshots. The version of the episode "Split!"—the only episode featuring this title sequence—that is included in the current DVD release (and aired on TV channel True Entertainment in the UK) nevertheless retains the standard title music, with the opening sword swipe sound effect where the first gunshot should be.

== See also ==
- The New Avengers
