= The Superlative Seven =

- The Avengers episode
- Episode no.: Season 5 Episode 12
- Directed by: Sidney Hayers
- Written by: Brian Clemens
- Original air dates: 5 April 1967 (Tyne Tees Television); 8 April 1967 (ABC Weekend TV)

Guest appearances
- Charlotte Rampling; Brian Blessed; Donald Sutherland; James Maxwell

Episode chronology
← Previous "Epic"	Next → "A Funny Thing Happened on the Way to the Station"

"The Superlative Seven" is the twelfth episode of the fifth series of the 1960s cult British spy-fi television series The Avengers, starring Patrick Macnee and Diana Rigg, and guest starring Charlotte Rampling, Brian Blessed, Donald Sutherland, and James Maxwell. It was first broadcast in the Southern and Tyne Tees regions of the ITV network on Wednesday 5 April 1967. ABC Weekend Television, who commissioned the show for ITV, broadcast it in its own regions three days later on Saturday 8 April. The episode was written by Brian Clemens, and directed by Sidney Hayers.

== Plot ==
Kanwitch, a crime boss looking for assassins, analyses the performances of men and women trained by Jessel, who boasts of the prowess of his work. Before agreeing to hire Jessel's assassins, Kanwitch requests one final, definitive ‘test’ of their abilities.

John Steed receives an invitation from Sir George Robertson, a famed explorer, to attend a fancy dress party he is hosting on an aeroplane. When Steed boards the following day, he is greeted by his fellow guests - fencing school owner Max Hardy, bullfighter Joe Smith, game hunter Jason Wade, marksman Hana Wilde, strongman Freddy Richards and controversial ex-military officer Major Mark Dayton.

After the plane takes off, the guests realise they have all been invited by different people and that none of their supposed hosts is on board. The plane is also remote-controlled rather than piloted by a human. Jessel broadcasts into the cabin, announcing that the guests are being taken to an undisclosed location for a ‘party’. Whilst awaiting their arrival, Steed theorises that each guest has been chosen for their prowess in a particular field of armed or unarmed combat.

The plane lands on an isolated island, and the guests disembark. They soon find an old, dilapidated mansion. The dining room includes ample weaponry for all seven, alongside coffins for six persons. Observing the guests through hidden cameras, Jessel and Kanwitch announce to the guests they are analysing the performance of their assassin in combat against the others. Jessel has invented a type of mental conditioning that can make humans impervious to normal physical and mental restraints, thus enhancing their skills and making them the perfect killing machine. The two men conclude by revealing that the assassin is one of the seven among them.

The guests decide to split up and search the island. Freddy is the first to be attacked by the assailant, and he is killed when his back is broken. The group hears Freddy's cries of pain but cannot find him. They return to the house to find his body placed into one of the coffins. Joe becomes the second victim when he is impaled with a pitchfork after avoiding a falling wagon, and Max is fatally stabbed after losing a fencing duel with the assailant.

Steed, Mark and Hana discover Joe and Max's bodies, making Mark suspicious of Steed's behaviour. Jason is missing, so the three split up to find him. Hana and Mark soon find Jason dead from a tiger trap, leading them to conclude Steed is the killer. They capture him and leave for the plane, intending to leave the island. Steed manages to free himself, whilst the assailant kills Mark.

Jason reveals himself as alive and admits to being the assailant. Steed and Jason fight, with Steed emerging victorious and seemingly killing him. However, Jason quickly disappears. Hana refuses to believe Steed's version of events and incapacitates him. She is lured into the woods by Jason but is rescued by Mrs Peel before Jason can kill her. Peel had followed Steed as backup given Steed had suspected his invitation was a fake all along.

Peel fights Jason to save the still incapacitated Steed. She wins and discovers two versions of Jason - identical twins. An enraged Kanwich berates Jessel for his deception about the prowess of ‘Jason’, leading Jessel to kill him. Hana prevents Jessel from killing Peel and Steed in turn incapacitates him.

== Cast ==
- Patrick Macnee as John Steed
- Diana Rigg as Emma Peel
- Charlotte Rampling as Hana Wilde
- Brian Blessed as Mark Dayton
- Donald Sutherland as Jessel
- James Maxwell as Jason Wade
- Hugh Manning as Max Hardy
- Leon Greene as Freddy Richards
- John Hollis as Kanwitch
- Gary Hope as Joe Smith
- Margaret Neale as Stewardess
