= The Frighteners (The Avengers) =

- The Avengers episode
- Screen title
- Episode no.: Season 1 Episode 15
- Directed by: Peter Hammond
- Written by: Berkely Mather
- Production code: 3412
- Original air date: 27 May 1961

Guest appearances
- Willoughby Goddard; Philip Gilbert; Stratford Johns; Doris Hare; Philip Locke; Godfrey James

Episode chronology
| ← Previous "The Springers" | Next → "The Yellow Needle" |

"The Frighteners" is the fifteenth episode of the first series of the 1960s cult British spy-fi television series The Avengers, starring Ian Hendry and Patrick Macnee. It was directed by Peter Hammond, designed by Robert Fuest, written by Berkely Mather and first broadcast by ABC on 27 May 1961.

For many years it was the only full episode which remained from the first series until the earlier episode Girl on the Trapeze was discovered in 2001 and the later episode Tunnel of Fear in 2016; as of 2022 it is the earliest complete episode to feature both Steed and Keel and the earliest surviving episode to feature Steed (owing to the debut episode, Hot Snow, surviving in incomplete form and extant footage ending before Steed's appearance and Girl on the Trapeze not featuring him at all).

== Plot ==
A wealthy businessman, Sir Thomas Weller, hires criminal thug racket named "The Frighteners" led by "The Deacon" to persuade his daughter's ill-suited boyfriend Jeremy de Willoughby to leave her. Weller is aware that de Willoughby is a gold digger.

Dr Keel and Steed rescue de Willoughby from the gang and Steed investigates him, whilst Keel investigates the organisation. Concurring with Weller that de Willoughby is a scammer, it is up to Steed and Dr Keel to frighten his daughter away from de Willoughby.

== Cast ==
- Ian Hendry as Dr. David H. Keel
- Patrick Macnee as John Steed
- Ingrid Hafner as Carol Wilson
- Willoughby Goddard as The Deacon
- Philip Gilbert as Jeremy de Willoughby
- Philip Locke as Moxon
- Doris Hare as Mrs. Briggs / Doris Courtney
- Stratford Johns as Sir Thomas Weller
- Dawn Beret as Marylin Weller
- David Andrews as Nigel
- Godfrey James as Nature Boy
- Neil Wilson as Beppi Colisimo
- Eric Elliott as Butler
- Ann Taylor as Secretary
- Ralph Tovey as Waiter, Nicholl
- Benn Simons as Inspector Charlie Foster
- Eleanor Darling as Flower Seller
- Ben Nightingale as Fred the Cabbie
- Victor Charrington as Breckin
- Frank Peters as Janitor
- Charles Wood as Police Constable

== Production ==
Production for the episode was completed on 25 May 1961. The episode is the first full episode which remains intact from the first series. For many years it was the only full episode which remained from the first series until Girl on the Trapeze was discovered in 2001 and Tunnel of Fear in 2016.

In the 1979 film Quadrophenia, the lead character's parents are seen watching the episode on TV.

== Reception ==
The episode was first broadcast by ABC on 27 May 1961. Anthony Aldgate described the episode as a "tantalising glimpse into the content and style of the first season and suggests that, at least to begin with, the series was a low-key crime drama which bore little relation to the fantasy and stylistic excess that was to follow in later years... It is essentially a thick-ear melodrama, featuring seedy underworld locations and villains with a nice line in slang dialogue ("I'm out on ticket, see? One lumber on me present form an' I'll be eatin' porridge till it's comin' out of me flippin' ears")." Aldgate also highlights that the episode does much to inform the viewers that Steed and Dr. Keel are still not professional detectives. The Avengers Forever! website described "The Frighteners" as technically being " just a teeny bit sloppy around the edges, with a few bumped cameras and fluffed lines (Keel: "I want two answers to two facts!"). Not to mention the audio is rather muffled which, given that Ian Hendry tends to mumble, makes for some spotty dialog." However, they consider Philip Locke to be one of their favourite guest stars, playing a "shifty-eyed" "young, brass-knuckled ruffian."
