= From Venus with Love =

- The Avengers episode
- Opening title
- Episode no.: Season 5 Episode 1
- Directed by: Robert Day
- Written by: Philip Levene (teleplay)
- Original air dates: 9 January 1967 (Southern Television); 14 January 1967 (ABC Weekend TV)

Guest appearances
- Barbara Shelley; Philip Locke; Jon Pertwee; Jeremy Lloyd; Derek Newark

Episode chronology
← Previous "Honey for the Prince"	Next → "The Fear Merchants"

"From Venus with Love" is the first episode of the fifth series of the 1960s cult British spy-fi television series The Avengers, starring Patrick Macnee and Diana Rigg, and guest starring Barbara Shelley, Derek Newark, Jon Pertwee, Jeremy Lloyd and Philip Locke. It was first broadcast in the Southern region of the ITV network on Monday 9 January 1967. ABC Weekend Television, who commissioned the show for ITV, broadcast it in its own regions five days later on Saturday 14 January. The episode was directed by Robert Day, and written by Philip Levene.

== Plot ==
Several astronomers—and members of the British Venusian Society—have been found dead, their hair bleached white. The Society had planned on sending a satellite to the planet Venus. As Steed and Peel investigate, they discover all the astronomers had been looking directly at the planet before they were found dead, which members say heralds an invasion by the Venusians. Steed and Peel soon uncover a scheme featuring lasers, a treacherous eye surgeon Dr. Primble, and a quest to launch a satellite to monitor Venus.

== Cast ==
- Patrick Macnee as John Steed
- Diana Rigg as Emma Peel
- Barbara Shelley as Venus Browne
- Philip Locke as Dr. Henry Primble
- Jon Pertwee as Brigadier Whitehead
- Derek Newark as Crawford
- Jeremy Lloyd as Bertram Smith
- Adrian Ropes as Jennings
- Arthur Cox as Clarke
- Paul Gillard as Cosgrove
- Michael Lynch as Hadley
- Kenneth Benda as Mansford
- Joe Powell as Martin (uncredited)

== Production ==
Writer Philip Levene first submitted this script in December 1965 for the show's fourth series under the title "The Light Fantastic." However it was rejected as being "too bizarre."

Abstract painting from the vault also appeared in episodes "Epic" (1967) and "Wish You Were Here" (1969). It can also be noticed in the series The Saint and The Power Artist.

Jeremy Lloyd (Bertram Smith) would later play an MI5 agent Carruthers in the stage play of The Avengers.

This was the first transmission of an Avengers episode that was filmed in colour (for the benefit of US viewers), even though the UK ITV network did not begin transmitting in colour until nearly three years later.

== Radio adaptation ==
"From Venus with Love" was adapted as a radio play and directed by Dennis Folbigge. Starring Donald Monat as John Steed and Diane Appleby as Emma Peel, it was broadcast as part of The Avengers radio series on Springbok Radio, which transmitted between 6 December 1971 and 28 December 1973.

The adaptation contains a few changes, which include mention of the Mother (and a phone call to Steed, ordering him to investigate Cosgrove's death, but the voice on the phone is not heard). Dr. Henry Primble is much older in this adaptation. The new scene with Steed and Emma in a rooftop garden was added to the script.

There are also some production errors. For example, in episode 4, Hugh refers to Dr. Primble as "Primple". And in episode 2, Brigadier Whitehead is referred to as Major Whitehead.
