= Hot Snow =

Hot Snow may refer to:

- "Hot Snow" (The Avengers), pilot episode of The Avengers
- Hot Snow (film), a 1972 Soviet film
