= Philip Levene =

English television writer, actor, and producer (1926–1973)

- Born: 9 June 1926; London, England
- Died: 25 March 1973 (aged 46); London, England
- Education: Webber Douglas Academy of Dramatic Art
- Occupations: Television screenwriter, actor, television producer

Philip Levene (9 June 1926 – 25 March 1973) was an English television writer, actor, and producer.

== Education and career ==
Levene trained as an actor at the Webber Douglas School of Dramatic Art and subsequent work included a small role in Brian Rix's long-running Whitehall farce Reluctant Heroes in the West End from 1950 to 1954.

Suffering from chronic ill health, he began writing radio plays in 1956. He used to work at the morgue before becoming a writer.

Levene wrote nineteen episodes of the 1960s television series The Avengers (winning a Writer's Guild Award) beginning in 1965, and served as script consultant for the series in 1968–69.

In 1967 and 1968, he created the television series Sanctuary and The First Lady.

He also contributed to the television series The Flying Doctor, The Invisible Man and the films The Firechasers and Deadly Strangers.

His stage play Kill Two Birds, a thriller with Roger Livesey and Renée Asherson, opened at London's St Martin's Theatre in 1962.

== Writing credits ==
Production	Notes	Broadcaster
Hour of Mystery	"Sound Alibi" (1957)	ITV
The Flying Doctor	12 episodes (1959)	ABC Weekend TV
Passo falso	TV Movie/Novel (1959)	
The Invisible Man	"Shadow on the Screen" (1959)	ITV
Knight Errant Limited	Unknown episodes (1959)	ITV
Armchair Theatre	"Suspicious Mind" (1959)	ITV
Ein Augenzeuge	TV Movie/Novel (1959)	
Armchair Mystery Theatre	"False Witness" (1960)	ITV
The Pursuers	"Master Key" (1961); "Suspect" (1961); "The Amateur" (1961); "The Gun" (1961)	
Destination – Fire!	Radio drama, 3 series 1962–1966	BBC
Drama 61-67	"Drama '61: Torment" (1961); "Drama '62: Luck of the Draw" (1962); "Drama '63: Question of Guilt" (1963); "Drama '64: It's Sad About Eddie" (1964)	ATV
Ghost Squad	"The Retirement of the Gentle Dove" (1963); "The Man with the Delicate Hands" (1963)	ITV
Sospecha	"Regalo Postumo" (1964); "La Desconfiada Tia Ellen" (1971)	TVE
Novela	"Doble melodía" (1965)	TVE
Srecan slucaj	TV Movie (1965)	
Thirty-Minute Theatre	"Parson's Pleasure" (1965)	BBC2
The Avengers	19 episodes (1965–69), including: "The Town of No Return" (1965); "The Cybernauts" (1965); "From Venus with Love" (1967); "The Fear Merchants" (1967); "Escape in Time" (1967); "The See-Through Man" (1967); "The Hidden Tiger" (1967); "Return of the Cybernauts" (1967); "Death's Door" (1967)	ITV
Tante detective	TV Movie (1966)	
Sanctuary	26 episodes (1967–68; creator); 1 episode (1967; writer)	ITV
The First Lady	38 episodes (1968–69; co-creator)	BBC1
Who-Dun-It	"Murder Impossible" (1969)	ATV
Mister Jerico	TV Movie (1970)	
Teatro de misterio	"Matar dos pájaros" (1970)	TVE
The Firechasers	Feature film (1971)	N/A
Suspicion	Unknown episodes (1971–72; series deviser)	ATV
Deadly Strangers	Feature film (1975)	N/A
Diagnosis: Murder	Feature film (1975)	N/A

== Acting credits ==
Production	Notes	Role
They Can't Hang Me	Feature film (1955)	BBC News Reader (uncredited)
ITV Play of the Week	"The Pay Off" (1955)	
Quatermass II	"The Food" (1955)	Supervisor
The Vise	"Second Sight" (1955)	Roy Temple
Tales from Soho	"Slippy Fives" (1956)	Manager
ITV Television Playhouse	"Morning Departure" (1956)	Stoker Marks
BBC Sunday Night Theatre	"The Fugitive" (1956)	
Reach for the Sky	Feature film (1956)	Sgt Williams, Tangmere (uncredited)
X the Unknown	Feature film (1956)	Security Man (uncredited)
The Avengers	"Who's Who?" (1967)	Daffodil

== See also ==
- List of English actors
- List of English writers
- List of people from London
