= The First Lady (British TV series) =

British TV comedy series (1968–1969)

- Thora Hird as Sarah Danby
- Genre: Drama
- Created by: Philip Levene
- Written by: Alan Plater; Cyril Abraham; Robert Storey
- Directed by: David Sullivan Proudfoot; Brian Parker
- Starring: Thora Hird
- Country of origin: United Kingdom
- Original language: English
- No. of series: 2
- No. of episodes: 39 (38 missing)

Production
- Producer: David Rose
- Running time: 50 minutes

Original release
- Network: BBC1
- Release: 7 April 1968 – 17 July 1969

The First Lady is a British television series produced by the BBC in 1968 and 1969.

The series stars Thora Hird as crusading local councillor Sarah Danby and is set around the fictional borough of Furness in Lancashire. Capitalising on the popularity of its lead actress, The First Lady ia a down-to-earth series exploring the inner workings of local government.

Due to the BBC's wiping policy of the era, the series mostly no longer exists in the BBC archives, with only one complete episode that is known to exist.

== Cast ==
- Thora Hird as Sarah Danby (39 episodes, 1968–1969)
- Henry Knowles as Tom Danby (38 episodes, 1968–1969)
- Robert Keegan as Will Tarrant (38 episodes, 1968–1969)
- James Grout as George Kingston (38 episodes, 1968–1969)
- Margaret John as Margaret Kingston (8 episodes, 1968–1969)
- Donald Layne-Smith as Alderman Bowland (4 episodes, 1968–1969)
- Pamela Craig as Betty (3 episodes, 1968–1969)
- George A. Cooper as Fred Glossop (3 episodes, 1968–1969)
