= The Secrets Broker =

- The Avengers episode
- Episode no.: Season 3 Episode 19
- Directed by: Jonathan Alwyn
- Written by: Ludovic Peters
- Production code: 3613
- Original air date: 1 February 1964

Guest appearances
- Avice Landone; Jack May; Ronald Allen; John Stone; Patricia English; John Ringham

Episode chronology
| ← Previous "Mandrake" | Next → "Trojan Horse" |

"The Secrets Broker" is the nineteenth episode of the third series of the 1960s cult British spy-fi television series The Avengers, starring Patrick Macnee and Honor Blackman. It was first broadcast by ABC on 1 February 1964. The episode was directed by Jonathan Alwyn and written by Ludovic Peters.

== Plot ==
Spirits order a murder, leading to blackmail and a wine shop that is being used as a front for espionage activities.

== Cast ==
- Patrick Macnee as John Steed
- Honor Blackman as Cathy Gale
- Avice Landone as Mrs. May Wilson
- Jack May as Waller
- Ronald Allen as Allan Paignton
- John Stone as Frederick Paignton
- Patricia English as Marion Howard
- John Ringham as Cliff Howard
- Brian Hankins as Jim Carey
- Jennifer Wood as Julia Wilson
- Valentino Musetti as Bruno
