= The Wringer =

- The Avengers episode
- Episode no.: Season 3 Episode 17
- Directed by: Don Leaver
- Written by: Martin Woodhouse
- Production code: 3618
- Original air date: 18 January 1964

Guest appearances
- Peter Sallis; Paul Whitsun-Jones; Barry Letts; Gerald Sim; Terence Lodge

Episode chronology
← Previous "The Little Wonders"	Next → "Mandrake"

"The Wringer" is the seventeenth episode of the third series of the 1960s British spy-fi television series The Avengers, starring Patrick Macnee and Honor Blackman. It was originally broadcast by ABC on the ITV network on 18 January 1964. The episode was directed by Don Leaver and written by Martin Woodhouse.

== Plot ==
Five British agents are eliminated in rapid succession on an Austrian "pipeline" escape route. Steed goes to investigate and finds himself wrongfully accused of betraying them.

== Cast ==
- Patrick Macnee as John Steed
- Honor Blackman as Cathy Gale
- Peter Sallis as Hal Anderson
- Paul Whitsun-Jones as Charles
- Barry Letts as Oliver
- Gerald Sim as Lovell
- Terence Lodge as The Wringer
- Neil Robinson as Bethune
- Douglas Cummings as Murdo
