= Annette Carell =

American actress (1926–1967)

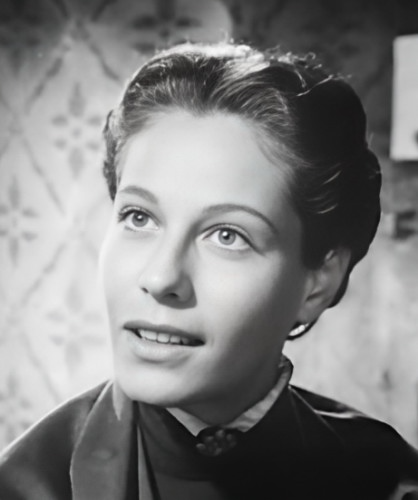
- Carell in Martin Luther (1953)
- Born: Anneliese Erlanger; 7 January 1926; Nuremberg, Bavaria, Germany
- Died: 20 October 1967 (aged 41); London, England
- Other name: Annette Karen Carell
- Occupation: Actress
- Spouse: Gerald Savory (m. 1953)

Annette Karen Carell (variously Carrell; born Anneliese Erlanger; 7 January 1926 – 20 October 1967) (Note: Some sources give her year of birth as 1929.) was a German-born American actress of stage, screen, and television who lived in the United States and Britain at various stages of her career. She appeared in American, British, and German films, plays, and television series, including Beyond the Curtain, No Hiding Place, The Prisoner, The Avengers, Out of the Unknown, Our Mother's House, and Z-Cars.

== Biography ==
=== Early life ===
Carell was born Anneliese Erlanger in Nuremberg, Bavaria, the daughter of Stephen (Stefan) Erlanger and Lilly Kromwell. Her family was Jewish, and left Nazi Germany for England in the late 1930s. In 1942 the family emigrated from England to the United States, where Carell became a naturalized American citizen on 12 February 1944 in Boston, Massachusetts. She attended the Leland Powers School in Boston.

=== Career ===
Under the name Annette Erlanger, her first notable acting role was a supporting part in the Washington National Theatre production of Robert E. Sherwood's play The Rugged Path (1945), starring Spencer Tracy. While acting in Germany in the early 1950s, she adopted the stage name Carell. Her most prominent film role was probably in the German-shot Martin Luther (1953) as Luther's wife, Katherine von Bora. She also had supporting roles in Darling (1965), Our Mother's House (1967), and The Vulture (1967).

=== Personal life ===
Carell married expatriate British playwright Gerald Savory in New Jersey on 1 September 1953. They returned to England from the U.S. in 1956; the couple had no children.

Carell died of a barbiturate overdose at her home in London on 20 October 1967, in what was ruled a suicide.

== Filmography ==
=== Films ===
Year	Production	Role	Notes
1952	The Sergeant's Daughter (Der Grosse Zapfenstreich)	Bettina von Laufen	
1953	Martin Luther	Katherine von Bora	
1960	Beyond the Curtain	Governor	
1960	The Tell-Tale Heart	Betty's Landlady	
1961	Wings of Death	Marie	Short film
1961	Return of a Stranger	Matron	
1961	Two Wives at One Wedding	Maria	
1965	Darling	Billie Castiglione	
1967	The Vulture	Ellen West	
1967	Our Mother's House	Mother	

=== Television ===
Year	Production	Role	Notes
1956	Armchair Theatre	Madame Klost	Episode: "The Outsider"
1957	The Queen and the Rebels	Elizabetta	TV film
1957	BBC Sunday Night Theatre	Princess Caroline of Brunswick	Episode: "The Lass of Richmond Hill"
1957	ITV Television Playhouse	Maria Kovali	Episode: "Who Killed Kovali?"
1957	Hour of Mystery	Helen Webster	Episode: "Sound Alibi"
1958	Television World Theatre	Sick Girl	Episode: "The Captain of Koepenick"
1958	Saturday Playhouse	Anna Kirsten	Episode: "So Many Children"
1959	Love and Mr Lewisham	Miss Alice Heydinger	5 episodes
1959	Bleak House	Mademoiselle Hortense	5 episodes
1960	International Detective	Rose Di Marco	Episode: "The Raffael Case"
1960	No Hiding Place	Claudine van Buren	Episode: "Bed of Roses"
1960	Maigret	Sylvie	Episode: "Liberty Bar"
1961	One Step Beyond	Frieda Hessler	Episode: "The Prisoner"
1961	ITV Play of the Week	Margery Bellows	Episode: "The Burden of Proof"
1961	Emergency Ward 10	Elaine Carr	4 episodes
1962	Dixon of Dock Green	Ada Jones	Episode: "A Special Kind of Jones"
1962	The Six Proud Walkers	Miss. Manson	2 episodes
1962	Outbreak of Murder	Sugar Bayliss	2 episodes
1962	Compact	Madame Roussin	4 episodes
1963	The Human Jungle	Laurie Winters	Episode: "The Flip Side Man"
1963	The Scales of Justice	Mrs. Joyce Warren	Episode: "The Invisible Asset"
1963–1965	Crane	Unknown; Giulia Bauer	2 episodes: "A Death of No Importance" (1963); "The Man in the Gold Waistcoat" (1965)
1964	Sergeant Cork	Clara Lancing	Episode: "The Case of the Six Suspects"
1965	The Saint	Katerina	Episode: "The Persistent Parasites"
1965	Buddenbrooks	Gerda	TV mini-series
1965	BBC Play of the Month	Hansi Brand	Episode: "The Joel Brand Story"
1965	The Man Who Never Was	Kaeth Van Zeeland	Episode: "Search for a Bent Twig"
1966	Out of the Unknown	Emma Bowles	Episode: "The Fastest Draw"
1967	Adam Adamant Lives!	Monique	Episode: "Conspiracy of Death"
1967	The Avengers	Dr. Voss	Episode: "The Fear Merchants"
1967	The Baron	Eleanor Saumarez	Episode: "Long Ago and Far Away"
1967	Z-Cars	Nina Papadopoulos	Double episode: "Who Said Anything About the Law?"
1967	Theatre 625	Anna	Episode: "Firebrand"
1967	The Prisoner	'B'	Episode: "A. B. and C."
1967	Man in a Suitcase	Gilchrist	Episode: "The Girl Who Never Was"
1967	The Informer	Moira Hepworth	Episode: "Your Money or Your Life"
