= The Fear Merchants =

- The Avengers episode
- Episode no.: Season 5 Episode 2
- Directed by: Gordon Flemyng
- Written by: Philip Levene (teleplay)
- Original air dates: 16 January 1967 (Southern Television); 21 January 1967 (ABC Weekend TV)

Guest appearances
- Patrick Cargill; Brian Wilde; Annette Carell; Garfield Morgan

Episode chronology
| ← Previous "From Venus with Love" | Next → "Escape in Time" |

"The Fear Merchants" is the second episode of the fifth series of the 1960s cult British spy-fi television series The Avengers, starring Patrick Macnee and Diana Rigg, and guest starring Patrick Cargill, Brian Wilde, Annette Carell, and Garfield Morgan. It was first broadcast in the Southern region of the ITV network on Monday 16 January 1967. ABC Weekend Television, who commissioned the show for ITV, broadcast it in its own regions five days later on Saturday 21 January. The episode was directed by Gordon Flemyng, and written by Philip Levene.

== Plot ==
Meadows, a businessman from Birmingham, is found incoherently wandering around Wembley Stadium at night. He is the latest in several cases of businessmen found scared out of their minds across the country, which leads to Steed and Peel being called in to investigate. Another businessman, Fox, is soon found in a similar condition after an incident at his gym. Unsure of what is causing these incidents, Steed and Peel determine that all the affected men are owners or senior executives at ceramics companies. They visit Crawley and White, Fox's fellow partners at his company. Not long after their meeting, Crawley is kidnapped by someone posing as his driver and is badly injured due to erratic driving.

Upon further investigation, Steed and Peel find that Jeremy Raven, the owner of another ceramics company, had written to the executives at the other companies proposing a merger, which was unanimously rejected. Despite the protection of Mrs Peel, White is also affected by someone playing on his fear of birds, the fear being so great that White ends up jumping from a window to his death. This causes Steed to apply more pressure on Raven, leading him to discover that Raven had hired the Business Efficiency Bureau to support him with the merger bid.

The Business Efficiency Bureau is an organisation headed by Pemberton, focused on ruthlessly helping its clients attain their business goals by working against their competitors. The Chief Scientist, Dr Voss, has developed a questionnaire for targets to answer under the innocent guise of 'market research', thus allowing the Bureau to understand their deepest fears and apply them in practice. The scaring incidents are carried out by Pemberton's enforcer, Gilbert, who had been the one to drive Crawley in the car and attack Mrs Peel in White's office after his death. Raven is horrified to discover what the Bureau has been doing and protests that he never meant for them to act so ruthlessly for him. Pemberton dismisses him, leading Raven to try to contact Steed.

The Bureau intercepts Raven's call and dispatches Gilbert to deal with him. Gilbert uses a giant spider to frighten Raven into insanity before Steed and Peel arrive. Realising the role of the Bureau in the attacks, Steed poses as a businessman and meets with Pemberton, Voss and Gilbert to hire them. However, a secret lie detector test conducted on Steed during the interview means the Bureau does not believe his cover story. Steed attempts to break through to Raven in his rare moments of sanity and realises that he suffers from arachnophobia, leading Steed also to work out that the other executives had crippling fears, namely being in wide open spaces for Meadows, mice for Fox, speed for Crawley and birds for White.

Gilbert attempts to kill Steed in a quarry but is unsuccessful. The two men fight, and Gilbert is crushed by his own excavator. With Gilbert missing, Pemberton and Voss decide to play along with Steed's cover story and kidnap Mrs Peel, whom Steed had identified as the rival to his cover identity. At the Bureau's headquarters, Pemberton demands Steed's whereabouts from Mrs Peel and threatens to use weaknesses from her questionnaire answers against her. However, the testing determines that Peel has a high fear index, meaning she is not easily scared like the others, and so Pemberton instead resorts to threatening torture. Steed, finding that Peel is gone, heads to the Bureau also.

A confrontation ensues, leading to Steed identifying Pemberton as having a crippling fear of the dark. Steed breaks the lights, and Voss and Pemberton are incapacitated in the subsequent fight. Returning to Mrs Peel's home, Steed and Peel celebrate their victory.

== Cast ==
- Patrick Macnee as John Steed
- Diana Rigg as Emma Peel
- Patrick Cargill as Pemberton
- Brian Wilde as Raven
- Annette Carell as Dr. Voss
- Garfield Morgan as Gilbert
- Andrew Keir as Crawley
- Jeremy Burnham as Gordon White
- Edward Burnham as Meadows
- Bernard Horsfall as Fox
- Ruth Trouncer as Dr. Hill
- Declan Mulholland as Saunders
- Phillip Ross as Hospital Attendant

== Production ==
Declan Mulholland receives screen credit as Saunders, despite his role being brief and non-speaking. Nevertheless, many actors in the series stay uncredited even with larger roles to play.

== Reception ==
According to Television's Greatest Hits, this episode was the top-rated episode for 1967, and ranked second of all The Avengers episodes according to viewer ratings at the time it aired.
