= Mrs Thursday =

British TV comedy series (1966–1967)

- Genre: Comedy drama
- Created by: Ted Willis
- Starring: Kathleen Harrison; Hugh Manning
- Country of origin: United Kingdom
- Original language: English
- No. of series: 3
- No. of episodes: 38

Production
- Running time: 60 minutes
- Production company: Associated Television

Original release
- Network: ITV
- Release: 15 March 1966 – 22 December 1967

Mrs Thursday is a British television comedy-drama starring veteran British actress Kathleen Harrison in the title role. Alice Thursday is an elderly Cockney charwoman who inherits £10 million fortune and the controlling interest in a multinational company. Produced by Jack Williams of Associated Television, the series was created by Ted Willis, and featured scripts by Jack Rosenthal. Hugh Manning played Richard Hunter, Mrs. Thursday's butler, business advisor, and confidant. Reg Lye played Bill Lee.

Three series comprising a total of thirty-eight episodes of Mrs Thursday were produced. Series One (13 episodes) was broadcast between 15 March and 7 June 1966; Series Two (13 episodes) between 27 December 1966 and 20 March 1967; and Series Three (12 episodes) between 5 October and 22 December 1967.

== Production ==
"The Train from Dunrich House" was partly filmed at Stapleford Park, and featured its miniature railway.

== Commercial release ==
Only the first two series have been released on DVD, via Network Releasing.

== Episode list ==
Series 1 (first broadcast 15 March – 7 June 1966)

- "A Ride in a Rolls-Royce"
- "Call Me Madam"
- "Family Reunion"
- "Thursday's Child"
- "Honesty Is the Best Policy"
- "The Girl from Fuller Street"
- "The Canvas Jungle"
- "You Don't Have to Book for Buckingham Palace"
- "The Snows of Yesteryear"
- "Hunter's Moon"
- "The Full Dress Affair"
- "The Sitting Tenant"
- "Margate Comes But Once a Year"

Series 2 (first broadcast 27 December 1966 – 20 March 1967)

- "A Little of What You Fancy"
- "Changes Over the Counter"
- "The Train from Dunrich Station"
- "The Duke and I"
- "When My Boy Comes Home"
- "Only Washing and Babies"
- "We Don't Pay London Prices"
- "The Answer Is a Lemon"
- "No Tea for the Tallyman"
- "Up the Garden Path"
- "The Old School Tie Up"
- "A Matter of Time"
- "Charity Begins at the Ball"

Series 3 (first broadcast 5 October – 22 December 1967)

- "News of a Cruise"
- "All in the Same Boat"
- "The Sea, the Sea, the Open Sea"
- "When in Malaga"
- "Two of a Kind"
- "A Genuine Moorish Momento"
- "Spring Time for Hunter"
- "Alice Is at It Again"
- "In the Sea Air"
- "A Question of Being Entitled"
- "Everything in Concert"
- "We Bid You All Goodbye"
