= The Sullavan Brothers =

British TV series (1964–1965)

- Genre: Drama
- Created by: Ted Willis
- Starring: Hugh Manning; Anthony Bate
- Country of origin: United Kingdom
- Original language: English
- No. of series: 3
- No. of episodes: 26 (1 missing)

Production
- Producer: Jack Williams
- Running time: 60 minutes
- Production company: Associated Television

Original release
- Network: ITV
- Release: 3 October 1964 – 22 September 1965

The Sullavan Brothers is a British television drama series created by Ted Willis which originally aired 1964–1965 on ITV in 26 episodes. The series chronicles the adventures of four lawyer brothers.

== Cast ==
=== Main cast ===
- Hugh Manning as Robert Sullavan
- Anthony Bate as Paul Sullavan
- David Sumner as Patrick Sullavan
- Tenniel Evans as John Sullavan
- Mary Kenton as Beth Sullavan
- Wendy Varnals as Anne Welsh
- A.J. Brown as Mr. Justice Ryner

=== Supporting cast ===
Actors appearing in episodes of the series include John Alderton, George Baker, Peter Barkworth, John Barrie, Bruce Boa, Ray Brooks, Claire Davenport, Windsor Davies, Dulcie Gray, Mervyn Johns, Ronald Leigh-Hunt, T. P. McKenna, Ian McShane, Bryan Pringle, Wendy Richard, Michael Ripper, Jo Rowbottom, Peter Sallis, Bill Shine, Donald Sutherland.

== Reception ==
Variety said of the first episode, "The Man from New York": "The whole thing was persuasive and thought-provoking. ...Cliff Owen’s direction of Jack Williams’s production was purposeful and lucid."
