= Michael Trubshawe =

British actor (1905–1985)

- in The Avengers: "All Done with Mirrors" (1968)
- Born: Michael Arthur T. Trubshaw; 7 December 1905; Chichester, Sussex, England
- Died: 21 March 1985 (aged 79); Sussex, England
- Years active: 1950–1971
- Spouse(s): Margaret Louise McDougall (1932–?) (divorced); Cecilia Tower (1943–?)

Michael Trubshawe (7 December 1905 – 21 March 1985) was a British actor and former officer in the Highland Light Infantry Regiment of the British Army. Trubshawe was very close friends with fellow British actor David Niven, serving with him at Malta and Dover. He was best man for both of Niven's weddings, and is constantly referred to in Niven's memoirs The Moon's a Balloon. Niven refers to finding out he would be working with him in The Guns of Navarone as "A lovely bonus for me".

Niven claims he lost touch with his army friend following Michael's marriage to Christian Scientist Margaret L. McDougall, the daughter of flour magnate James Gladstone McDougall whose company joined Rank flours. Rank's owners had a Methodist background and the company formed Rank pictures to counter the loose morality of movie culture. Trubshawe was the son of architect Vyvian Trubshawe (1853–1924).

== Partial filmography ==
- A Matter Of Life And Death (1946) – as himself, Michael Trubshawe, uncredited
- They Were Not Divided (1950) – Major Bushey Noble
- Dance Hall (1950) – Colonel
- The Lavender Hill Mob (1951) – British Ambassador
- Encore (1951) – Ascot Man (segment "The Ant and the Grasshopper")
- The Magic Box (1951) – Sitter in Bath Studio
- My Seal and Them (1951) – Sir Frederick
- The Card (1952) – Yeomanry Officer (uncredited)
- Brandy for the Parson (1952) – Redworth
- Something Money Can't Buy (1952) – Willy
- Meet Me Tonight (1952) – Professor 'Chaps' Chapsworth: Ways and Means
- The Titfield Thunderbolt (1953) – Ruddock
- The Rainbow Jacket (1954) – Gresham
- Orders Are Orders (1954) – A.D.C. Lt. MacAllister
- You Lucky People! (1955) – Lt. Col. Barkstone-Gadsby
- Private's Progress (1956) – Col. Fanshawe
- Around the World in Eighty Days (1956) – Shop Customer in Photograph (uncredited)
- The Passionate Stranger (1957) – 2nd Landlord
- Doctor at Large (1957) – Colonel Graves
- The Rising of the Moon (1957) – Colonel Charles Frobisher (2nd Episode)
- I Accuse! (1957) – English Publisher
- Gideon's Day (1958) – Golightly
- Law and Disorder (1958) – Ivan
- Scent of Mystery (1960) – English Aviator
- The Guns of Navarone (1961) – Weaver
- The Best of Enemies (1961) – Col. Brownhow
- Operation Snatch (1962) – Col. Marston
- Reach for Glory (1962) – Maj. Burton
- The Mouse on the Moon (1963) – British Aide
- The Pink Panther (1963) – Felix Townes
- A Hard Day's Night (1964) – Casino Manager (uncredited)
- Danger Man (television series; 'The Colonel's Daughter') (1964) – Colonel Blakeley
- The Amorous Adventures of Moll Flanders (1965) – Lord Mayor of London
- Those Magnificent Men in Their Flying Machines (1965) – Niven
- The Sandwich Man (1966) – Guardsman
- The Spy with a Cold Nose (1966) – Braithwaite
- Bedazzled (1967) – Lord Dowdy
- A Dandy in Aspic (1968) – Flowers
- Salt and Pepper (1968) – 'Fake' First Lord
- Monte Carlo or Bust! (1969) – German Rally Official
- Battle of Britain (1969) – Air Observer (uncredited)
- The Magic Christian (1969) – Sir Lionel (uncredited)
- The Rise and Rise of Michael Rimmer (1970) – Mandeville
- Fumo di Londra (1971) – Il Colonello
