= John Hollis =

British actor (1927–2005)

- Born: Bertie Wyn Hollis; 12 November 1927; Fulham, London, England
- Died: 18 October 2005 (aged 77); London, England
- Occupation: Actor
- Years active: 1958–2000
- Spouses: Gabrielle Hamilton (m. 1953–1965) Sheila Forrester (m. 1966–2005)
- Children: Sarah Hollis Andrews

Bertie Wyn "John" Hollis (12 November 1927 – 18 October 2005) was a British actor. He is known for his appearances as Lobot in the Star Wars film The Empire Strikes Back and Ernst Stavro Blofeld in the James Bond film For Your Eyes Only. He is also known for appearing in the Superman films, Casino Royale, The Dirty Dozen, and Flash Gordon.

== Early life ==
Bertie Wyn Hollis was born on 12 November 1927 in Fulham, London.

== Career ==
He played the role of Lobot in The Empire Strikes Back and the German porter at the chateau in The Dirty Dozen. He appeared in the Christopher Reeve Superman films Superman and Superman II as an elder of Krypton, and in Superman IV: The Quest for Peace as a Russian General.

He also played the role of Ernst Stavro Blofeld (dubbed over by Peter Marinker) in the cold open of the 1981 James Bond film For Your Eyes Only, going uncredited due to the controversy over the film rights and characters of Thunderball. In this sequence, his character was famously lifted from a wheelchair and dropped to his death down a chimney stack by Bond (Roger Moore) after he had attempted to kill Bond by using a remote control link to Bond's MI6 helicopter.

Hollis's other film work included minor roles in Captain Kronos – Vampire Hunter for Hammer Films and Gene Wilder's The Adventure of Sherlock Holmes' Smarter Brother. In television, Hollis took the role of Sondergaard in the Jon Pertwee era of Doctor Who in the story The Mutants, and appeared in The Avengers episode The Cybernauts as a sensei, and in The Superlative Seven as Magwitch. He was also in The Tomorrow People. He also appeared as "Kaufmann" with a young Julie Christie in the BBC classic 'lost series' A for Andromeda.

Hollis was a versatile character actor for BBC Radio. Notable roles include Magwitch in Great Expectations, Leonard Bast in Howards End, Conan Doyle's Inspector Lestrade and Shakespeare's Bardolph. He also took part in some commercial recordings, in parts as various as the March Hare in Alice's Adventures in Wonderland and the Murderer of the Duke of Clarence in Richard III.

He broadcast his own recollections of a cockney childhood, for the BBC in the 1970s.

In 2000, he was hired to replace Australian voice actor Keith Scott as the voice of Gordon the Big Engine in Thomas and the Magic Railroad, but he himself was later replaced by Canadian actor Neil Crone.

== Selected filmography ==
=== Film ===
Year	Title	Role	Notes
1967	Casino Royale	Fred (Temple Priest)	Uncredited
1967	The Dirty Dozen	German Porter at Chateau	Uncredited
1968	On the Run	Baldy	
1971	Creatures the World Forgot	Masked Attacker	Uncredited
1971	Freelance	Hartley	
1973	Ghost in the Noonday Sun	Kanaris	
1974	Captain Kronos – Vampire Hunter	Barman	
1975	The Adventure of Sherlock Holmes' Smarter Brother	Moriarty's Gunman	
1978	Superman	4th Elder (Krypton Council)	
1980	The Empire Strikes Back	Lobot (Lando's aide)	
1980	Flash Gordon	Klytus Observer No. 2	
1980	Superman II	Krypton Elder	
1981	For Your Eyes Only	Ernst Stavro Blofeld	Uncredited
1986	Valhalla	Hymer	English version, voice
1987	Superman IV: The Quest for Peace	Russian General	
2000	Thomas and the Magic Railroad	Gordon the Big Engine	Original workprints, voice

=== Television ===
Year	Title	Role	Notes
1962	The Andromeda Breakthrough	Kaufman	6 episodes
1963–1967	The Saint	Maximillian Tordoff/West	2 episodes
1963–1968	The Avengers	Various	4 episodes
1971	Armchair Theatre	Blond	Episode "Detective Waiting"
1972	Doctor Who: The Mutants	Sondergaard	4 episodes
1980	Blake's 7	Lorn	1 episode, Powerplay
1981	The Day of the Triffids	Alf	1 episode
1984	Look and Read: Badger Girl	Mr Barker	8 episodes
1995	The Great Kandinsky	Cannonball	Television film
1999	Esther	Harbona	Television film
