= Philip Locke =

British actor (1928–2004)

- Locke as Vargas in Thunderball 1965
- Born: Roy James Locke; 29 March 1928; Marylebone, London, England
- Died: 19 April 2004 (aged 76); Dedham, Essex, England
- Years active: 1956–1998
- Partner: Michael Ivan

Roy James "Philip" Locke (29 March 1928 – 19 April 2004) was an English actor who had roles in film and television. He is perhaps best known for his part in the James Bond film Thunderball as Largo's personal assistant and chief henchman, Vargas.

== Biography ==
=== Early career ===
Locke trained at RADA, and from the late 1950s was part of the ensemble at the Royal Court Theatre, where John Osborne described him as "special and reliable".

=== Television ===
On television, Locke is remembered by fans of the science fiction series Doctor Who for his appearance in the 1982 serial Four to Doomsday as Bigon. Other TV credits include: The Baron, The Avengers episodes 'The Frighteners' (1961), 'Mandrake' (1964), Hamlet (1964) and 'From Venus With Love' (1967), The Saint, The Champions, Department S, Z-Cars, Pennies from Heaven, The Omega Factor, Codename Icarus, The Box of Delights, Bergerac, Inspector Morse, Jeeves and Wooster, Minder, Antony and Cleopatra, She Fell Among Thieves (BBC), Oliver Twist, Ivanhoe and Jekyll & Hyde.

=== Stage ===
A member of the Royal Shakespeare Company, Locke also played Professor Moriarty on Broadway in Sherlock Holmes in 1974–1976 and appeared in Amadeus at the National Theatre.

=== Personal life ===
Locke was survived by his companion, Michael Ivan.

== Filmography ==
- Cloak Without Dagger (1956) - 1st Soldier
- Heart of a Child (1958) - 1st Soldier
- The Bulldog Breed (1960) - Teddy Boy in Cinema Fight (uncredited)
- The Girl on the Boat (1961) - Bream Mortimer
- Seven Keys (1961) - Norman's Thug (uncredited)
- Follow That Man (1961) - Vicar
- Edgar Wallace Mysteries, "On the Run" episode (1963) - David Hughes
- Edgar Wallace Mysteries, "Incident at Midnight" episode (1963) - Foster
- Edgar Wallace Mysteries, "Face of a Stranger" episode (1964) - John Bell
- Father Came Too! (1964) - Stan
- Thunderball (1965) - Vargas
- The Fiction Makers (1968) - Frug
- Hitler: The Last Ten Days (1973) - Hanske
- She Fell Among Thieves - Acorn
- Escape to Athena (1979) - Colonel Vogel
- Porridge (1979) - Banyard
- Oliver Twist (1982, TV Movie) - Mr. Sowerberry
- Ivanhoe (1982) - Grand Master
- The Plague Dogs (1982) - Civil Servant #1 (voice)
- Ascendancy (1983) - Dr. Strickland
- And the Ship Sails On (1983) - Prime Minister
- The Inquiry (1986)
- Stealing Heaven (1988) - Poussin
- Jekyll & Hyde (1990) - Editor
- Turbulence (1991) - Vic
- Jacob (1994) - Diviner
- Tom & Viv (1994) - Charles Haigh-Wood
- Othello (1995) - 1st Senator
- Wilde (1997) - Judge
