= Hot Snow (The Avengers) =

- The Avengers episode
- Screen title
- Episode no.: Season 1 Episode 1
- Directed by: Don Leaver
- Written by: Ray Rigby based on a story by Patrick Brawn
- Production code: 3365
- Original air date: 7 January 1961

Guest appearances
- Catherine Woodville; Philip Stone; Robert James; Godfrey Quigley; Moira Redmond; Murray Melvin; Charles Wade

Episode chronology
← Previous —	Next → "Brought to Book"

"Hot Snow" is the debut episode of the 1960s cult British spy-fi television series The Avengers, starring Ian Hendry and Patrick Macnee. It originally aired on ABC on 7 January 1961. Only about 15 minutes, the first of three acts, remain. The episode was directed by Don Leaver and generally acknowledged to have been written by Ray Rigby, but Brian Clemens claimed to have written it.

== Plot ==
Dr. David Keel's (Ian Hendry) fiancée and surgery receptionist Peggy (Catherine Woodville) is murdered by a ruthless gang of drug dealers. By accident he receives a consignment of heroin at his surgery. Believing it to have been sent by the gang who killed his fiancée, he seeks revenge and with the help of a mysterious figure John Steed (Patrick Macnee) they hunt the gang down. They find the gang leader Spicer and set a trap for him but he escapes and is finally caught in the next episode. Keel decides he enjoys playing amateur detective and decides to form a duo with Steed.

== Cast ==
- Ian Hendry as Dr. David H. Keel
- Patrick Macnee as John Steed
- Philip Stone as Dr. Richard J. Tredding
- Catherine Woodville as Peggy Stevens
- Godfrey Quigley as Spicer
- Murray Melvin as Charlie
- Charles Wade as Johnson
- Alister Williamson as Detective Superintendent Wilson
- Moira Redmond as Stella
- Astor Sklair as Detective Sergeant Rogers
- June Monkhouse as Mrs. Simpson
- Robert James as The Big Man/Ronnie Vance

== Production ==
The episode was originally intended as a direct follow-up to Police Surgeon starring Ian Hendry as Geoffrey Brent, but in November 1960, producer Leonard White issued a memorandum which made it clear that "a new name is being found for Hendry's character, and that The Avengers will now have absolutely nothing to do with Police Surgeon". He continued to produce The Avengers and working with Hendry in a whole new concept, with Hendry playing the new character of Dr. David Keel.

The episode is usually considered to have been written by Ray Rigby, based on a story by Patrick Brawn; however, in an interview with Wheeler W. Dixon in May 1999, Brian Clemens, the creator of the series, claims to have written it. The episode sets were designed by Alpho O'Reilly. Production by ABC Weekend Television was wrapped up on 30 December 1960. The episode premiered on ABC in the Midlands and North of England on Saturday 7 January 1961 at 10pm. Only the first 15 minutes of the first act of the episode survive; the remaining two acts are thought to be lost. The extant footage ends with the sequence in which Keel's fiancée Peggy is shot, before the introduction of John Steed. It has been released on DVD as a bonus feature by A&E Home Video in its Emma Peel Megabox collection, alongside the two complete surviving episodes from Season 1.

Catherine Woodville, who plays Dr Keel's fiancée, later became Patrick Macnee's second wife.

== Reception ==
The episode and series is described by Anthony Aldgate as being "conceived within the discourse of psychological realism that informed most contemporary television drama. It set up a motivation for the hero-figure of Keel, described by Hendry as 'a most attractive character [who] combines toughness with compassion and serves as the conscience of the team'. Steed, in contrast, is portrayed as a more cynical figure for whom the most obvious influence was James Bond. However, whereas Bond traveled to exotic foreign locations in his pursuit of international super-criminals such as Dr. No or Goldfinger, The Avengers was concerned mainly with home-grown criminals whose ambitions (at least to begin with) were somewhat less grandiose." Toby Miller remarked that "Far from being rustic, The Avengers was a landmark in the cultural division of labour".

The episode has been described as "dark, realistic, and, because it was shot on videotape and live-on-camera, very stagy. Its subject matter was most unAvengers like, dealing with drug-smugglers, bereavement, and the seedy underside of British crime." The Avengers Forever! website technically regards the episode as at least as good as any Cathy Gale episode, with some "excellent camera work, including very creative special-effects", but spotted deficiencies in the "repetitive use of certain music cues, and a slightly awkward sequence when Dr Keel's fiancée is shot." They remarked that the episode shows a "high degree of professionalism and skill: good writing, good acting, great direction (no surprise, really, with Don Leaver at the helm), and, in particular, a fine lead. Ian Hendry demonstrates exactly why Sydney Newman was so very anxious to get him in front of television viewers: he is a natural. His acting is easy, smooth and captivating."

== Other media ==
In January 2014 Big Finish Productions released an audio adaption of "Hot Snow" as the first part of a series of audio reconstructions of the missing stories from season 1, following the original scripts as closely as possible.
