= Jennifer Croxton =

English actress (1944–2024)

Jennifer Croxton (30 November 1944 – 6 December 2024) was a British actress.

== Life and career ==
Jennifer Croxton was born in Cambridge on 30 November 1944.

Croxton guest-starred as Lady Diana Forbes-Blakeney opposite Patrick Macnee in a 1969 episode of The Avengers, "Killer", a role that remains one of her best-known. She appeared in the film Our Miss Fred (1972) opposite Danny La Rue; her other television credits include It's Awfully Bad for Your Eyes, Darling, Anne of Avonlea, and The Lady and the Highwayman. She played Plautia Urgulanilla in I, Claudius, and appeared in The Cleopatras, The Agatha Christie Hour and The Stanley Baxter Show.

In 2003 Croxton portrayed Wallis Simpson in Paul Ibell's play A Dangerous Woman, at the Jermyn Street Theatre, London.

Croxton was a member of the BAFTA academy. She died on 6 December 2024, at the age of 80.
