= Katherine Woodville (actress) =

British actress (1938–2013)

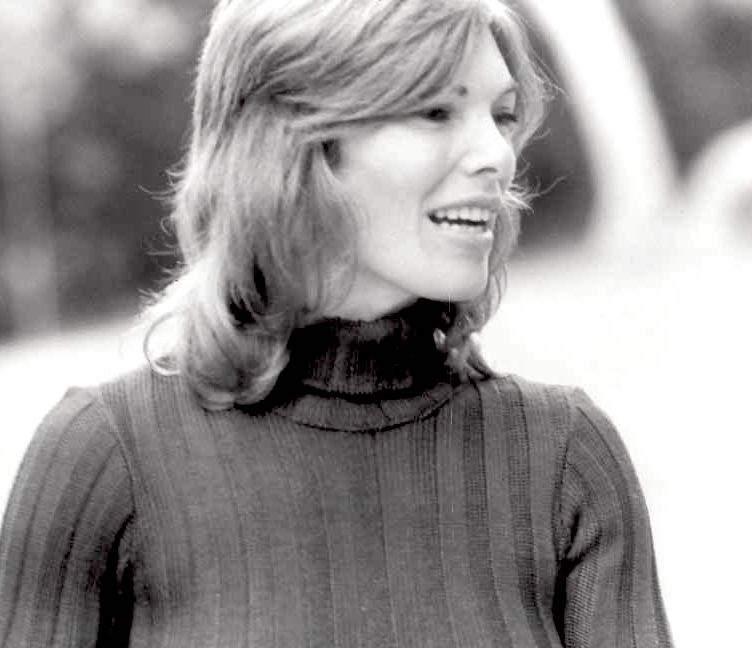
- Woodville in Extreme Close-Up (1973)
- Born: Catherine Woodville; 12 March 1938; London, England
- Died: 5 June 2013 (aged 75); Portland, Oregon, United States
- Occupation: Actress
- Years active: 1955–1979
- Known for: For the World Is Hollow and I Have Touched the Sky
- Spouses: Patrick Macnee (m. 1965; div. 1969) Jerrold Freedman (m. 1970; div. 1975) Edward Albert (m. 1979; died 2006)
- Children: 1

Katherine Woodville (born Catherine Woodville; 12 March 1938 – 5 June 2013) was an English film and television actress. She changed her professional name to Kate Woodville in 1967 upon moving to the U.S., where she eventually became a life member of the Actors Studio.

== Career ==
She was known for her appearances in Z-Cars, The Avengers, Danger Man, Mission: Impossible, It Takes a Thief, Mannix, The Rockford Files, Days of Our Lives, Eight Is Enough, Star Trek, Kung Fu, The Saint and Gibbsville.

== Personal life ==
Woodville married three times: first to Avengers actor Patrick Macnee and then to Jerrold Freedman, an American film and television director and novelist.

Her third marriage was to actor Edward Albert, the son of Eddie Albert, from 1978 until his death in 2006. The couple had one child, a daughter, singer/songwriter and poet Tai Woodville (born 1980).

Woodville retired from acting in 1979. She died of cancer on 5 June 2013 at the age of 75.

== Filmography ==
Year	Title	Role	Notes
1961	The Clue of the New Pin	Jane Ardfern	
1961	The Avengers	Peggy	episode: "Hot Snow"
1961	A Chance of Thunder	Pam Marchant	5 episodes
1962	The Wild and the Willing	Sarah Phillips	
1962	Sir Francis Drake	Little Dove	episode: "The Fountain of Youth"
1962	The Avengers	Laure	episode: "Propellant 23"
1963	The Informers	Mary Johnnoe	
1964	In Camera	Estelle	1 episode
1965	Danger Man	Janet Wells	episode: "Colony Three" 1965: Z Cars, episode: 'Happy Families'
1965	The Crooked Road	Elena	
1965	The Party's Over	Nina	
1965	The Brigand of Kandahar	Elsa	
1968	It Takes a Thief	Janet Sanders	episode: "One Illegal Angel"
1968	Star Trek	Natira	episode: "For the World Is Hollow and I Have Touched the Sky"
1968	Mission Impossible	Felicia Vabar	episode: "The Spy"
1969	Fear No Evil	Ingrid Dorne	TV movie
1969	Mannix	Johanna Sault	episode: "A View of Nowhere"
1970	The Virginian (TV series)	Vanessa McKenzie	season 9, episode 11 "Follow the Leader"
1971	Mannix	Vera	episode: "What Happened to Sunday"
1972	Black Gunn	Louella	
1973	Extreme Close-Up	Sally Norman	
1974	Kung Fu	Nedra Chamberlain	
1975	Kolchak: The Night Stalker	Dr. Helen Lynch	episode: "Primal Scream"
1975	Ellery Queen (TV series)	Priscilla Hagen	episode: "The Wary Witness"
1975	Posse	Mrs. Cooper	
1975	The Rockford Files	Marilyn Rae	episode: "Say Goodbye to Jennifer"
1976	The Rockford Files	Karen Silver	episode: "A Portrait of Elizabeth"
1977	The Rhinemann Exchange	Mrs. Cameron	3 episodes, uncredited
1977	Days of Our Lives	Marie Horton	44 episodes, recurring
1979	Where's Willie?	Beth Wade	
1978	Little House on the Prairie	Bess Bevins	episode "The Man Within" (as Kate Woodville)
1979	The New Adventures of Wonder Woman	Adele Kobler	episode: "Amazon Hot Wax" (as Kate Woodville)
1979	Eight Is Enough	Ms. Chovick	2 episodes; final role
