= Adrian Ropes =

British television actor (1941–2004)

- Born: 8 May 1941; Cairo, Egypt
- Died: 11 March 2004 (aged 62); Norwich, Norfolk, England
- Occupation: Television actor

Adrian Ropes (8 May 1941 – 11 March 2004) was a British television actor. He appeared in British television series Emergency – Ward 10, The Human Jungle, The Avengers, Randall and Hopkirk, Budgie and others.

== Acting credits ==
Production	Notes	Role
Emergency – Ward 10	1 episode (1961)	Gordon Truke
ITV Play of the Week	"Valentina" (1964)	Jim
The Human Jungle	"Dual Control" (1964)	
The Scarlet and the Black	2 episodes (1965)	Korasoff
An Enemy of the State	2 episodes (1965)	Wilson-Nichols
Quick Before They Catch Us	3 episodes (1966)	Roloff Banks
The Avengers	"The Danger Makers" (1966); "From Venus with Love" (1967); "Whoever Shot Poor George Oblique Stroke XR40?" (1968)	Stanhope; Jennings; Baines
BBC Play of the Month	"Cyrano de Bergerac" (1968)	Third Cadet
The Way We Live Now	5 episodes (1969)	Dolly Longestaffe
Randall and Hopkirk	"A Disturbing Case" (1969)	The Sergeant
Happy Ever After	"The Marriage Vow" (1970)	Roger
Budgie	"Dreaming of Thee" (1972)	Baines-Johnson
Jennie: Lady Randolph Churchill	4 episodes (1974)	Arthur Balfour
The Madness	TV Movie (1976)	Gen. Asensio Torrado
Under the Bed	Movie (1977)	Frank
