= Mandrake (The Avengers) =

- The Avengers episode
- Episode no.: Season 3 Episode 18
- Directed by: Bill Bain
- Written by: Roger Marshall
- Production code: 3620
- Original air date: 25 January 1964

Guest appearances
- John Le Mesurier; George Benson; Madge Ryan; Philip Locke; Annette Andre

Episode chronology
← Previous "The Wringer"	Next → "The Secrets Broker"

"Mandrake" is the eighteenth episode of the third series of the 1960s cult British spy-fi television series The Avengers, starring Patrick Macnee and Honor Blackman. It was first broadcast by ABC on 25 January 1964. The episode was directed by Bill Bain and written by Roger Marshall.

== Plot ==
A large number of prominent businessmen are buried in a Cornish graveyard near to a tin mine. Steed suspects foul play after a close friend meets the same fate.

== Cast ==
- Patrick Macnee as John Steed
- Honor Blackman as Cathy Gale
- John Le Mesurier as Dr. Macombie
- George Benson as Reverend Adrian Whyper
- Madge Ryan as Eve Turner
- Philip Locke as Roy Hopkins
- Annette Andre as Judy
- Robert Morris as Steve Benson
- Jackie Pallo as Scott Sexton
