= Moira Redmond =

English actress (1928–2006)

- Born: 14 July 1928; Bognor Regis, Sussex, UK
- Died: 16 March 2006 (aged 77); London, UK
- Years active: 1959–1997
- Spouse(s): Anthony Hughes (1951–1957); Herbert Wise (1962–1972)

Moira Redmond (14 July 1928 – 16 March 2006) was an English actress.

== Biography ==
Redmond was born in Bognor Regis, Sussex, England. Her parents were actors and director-managers, although she was also cared for by other relatives. Her grandfather was the actor-manager-playwright E. Hill Mitchelson.

As a young actress she joined the Windmill Girls (evoked in the film Mrs Henderson Presents), who performed non-stop revues and nude tableaux at the Windmill Theatre in the West End. Several years later she married her first husband and emigrated to Australia, but the marriage did not endure, so she returned to Britain in 1957. While in Australia, Redmond became a successful radio actress. She played in the major radio features, Caltex Theatre and General Motors' Hour, as well as plays for the Australian Broadcasting Commission. Her best-remembered radio drama was Lindsay Hardy's Stranger in Paradise, alongside Guy Doleman – a New Zealand actor who later had a movie career both in the US and Britain.

She made her stage debut as an understudy to Vivien Leigh in Peter Brook's revival of Titus Andronicus with Laurence Olivier. In July of that year, she made her London debut at the Stoll in the same production.

She made her film debut in a thriller titled Violent Moment (1958), which was followed by several more roles in the films Doctor in Love (1960), Jigsaw (1962), A Shot in the Dark (1964) and several B-film thrillers.

Meanwhile, her theatrical career had taken off with roles in Verdict (Strand), in which she played Helen Rollander; Detour After Dark (Fortune Theatre), Horizontal Hold (Comedy Theatre); Patrick Peace Hotel (Queen's); The Winter's Tale (Cambridge Theatre) and Flint (Comedy Theatre).

She was also a founder member of the Actors' Company, alongside Ian McKellen. Redmond appeared as a page in Iris Murdoch's The Three Arrows (17 October – 11 November 1972) along with McKellen. She played at the Edinburgh Festival as Helen of Troy in The Trojan Women with Flora Robson, and as Hermione in The Winter's Tale alongside Laurence Harvey.

Throughout the 1960s she appeared in London and the provinces in the plays of Alan Ayckbourn. She was also Lady Sheerwell in Jonathan Miller's revival of Sheridan's The School for Scandal; Maria in Twelfth Night; Mrs Wickstead in Habeas Corpus; Brand's mother in Brand; and Jocasta in Stephen Spender's trilogy Oedipus. She later toured South America for the British Council in revivals of Habeas Corpus and Shaw's Heartbreak House (as Hesione). Her film appearances included three of the Edgar Wallace Mysteries. Her television appearances in the 1960s included roles in "Hot Snow" (the first episode of The Avengers) and in Danger Man and The Baron, among others.

By the 1970s she was increasingly in demand for television series; her theatrical training earned her roles in some of the best-known television dramas of the period, including Edward the Seventh (playing Edward's mistress Alice Keppel); I, Claudius (in which she played Domitia, Claudius's mother-in-law); and Boswell's London Journey. She also appeared in Dixon of Dock Green, Thriller (1 episode, 1974), and The Sweeney. In 1994 she appeared in an adaptation of Hand in Glove, part of the series The Inspector Alleyn Mysteries.

== Personal life ==
She was twice-divorced; firstly from Anthony Hughes (married 1951–1957), secondly from Austrian-born British actor, producer and director Herbert Wise (married 1962–1972). Redmond died of a heart attack on 16 March 2006, at a nursing home in south-east London. She had been suffering from senile dementia for some years.

== Selected filmography ==
- Violent Moment (1959) as Kate Glennon
- Doctor in Love (1960) as Sally Nightingale
- Edgar Wallace Mysteries – Marriage of Convenience (1960) as Tina
- Pit of Darkness (1961) as Julie Logan
- Edgar Wallace Mysteries – Partners in Crime (1961) as Freda Strickland
- Jigsaw (1962) as Joan Simpson
- Kill or Cure (1962) as Frances Roitman (Clifford's secretary)
- Freud: The Secret Passion (1962) as Nora Wimmer
- Edgar Wallace Mysteries – The Share Out (1962) as Diana Marsh
- Nightmare (1964) as Grace Maddox
- A Shot in the Dark (1964) as Simone
- Danger Man – episodes: "The Relaxed Informer" (1961) as Ruth Mitchell, "Under the Lake" (1961) as Mitzi von Klaus and "Parallel Lines Sometimes Meet" (1965) as Nicola Tarasova
- The Limbo Line (1968) as Ludmilla
