= Hour of Mystery =

1957 British anthology TV series

Hour of Mystery is an hour-long UK mystery anthology television series. Donald Wolfit introduced each of the episodes, which were produced by ABC Weekend TV and aired on the ITV network in 1957.

Only two of the episodes are known to exist, out of the 20 made.

Episodes included adaptations of The Man in Half Moon Street, The Woman in White, Portrait in Black, and Night Must Fall.
