= Patricia English =

British television actress

- Born: Patricia Anne Shippam; October 1931; Detroit, Michigan, U.S.
- Died: 13 August 2016 (aged 84); Cornwall, United Kingdom
- Spouse: Desmond Alfred Cohen

Patricia English (October 1931 – 13 August 2016) was a British television actress.

== Early years ==
English was born Patricia Anne Shippam in Detroit, Michigan. Patricia Anne Fox was her maiden name and Patricia is of English parents who happened to be in America at that time.

== Career ==
She appeared in various episodes of television series such as Mogul, Department S, The Champions, The Avengers, and The Rat Catchers.

== Personal life ==
English wed Desmond Alfred Cohen in 1960, and they remained married until his death in 2000. She gave up acting to concentrate on her marriage, which was childless. English spent part of her retirement running a guest house in Truro, Cornwall.

== Filmography ==
- Confess, Killer (1957) - Mrs. Digby
- Two and Two Make Six (1962) - Club Stewardess
- Sammy Going South (1963) - Mrs. Hartland (uncredited)
- The Avengers (1962-1967, TV Series) - Dr. James (Never, Never Say Die) / Marion Howard / Carla Berotti
- Department S (1969) - Mrs Taylor (The Last Train to Redbridge)
