= Hugh Manning =

English actor (1920–2004)

- in The Elephant Man (1980)
- Born: Hugh Gardner Manning; 19 August 1920; Birmingham, Warwickshire, England
- Died: 18 August 2004 (aged 83); London, England
- Occupation: Actor

Hugh Gardner Manning (19 August 1920 – 18 August 2004) was an English film, radio and television actor. He is best remembered as the Reverend Donald Hinton, in the soap opera Emmerdale Farm, a role he played from 1977 until 1989. From 1964 to 1965 he appeared in the ITV drama The Sullavan Brothers. He also starred in the tv series Mrs Thursday, alongside Kathleen Harrison in 1966, playing a suave and imperturbable business adviser, which also carried over into popular tv commercials where his character endorsed the qualities of Robinsons barley water. Also in 1966 he appeared in The Avengers in the episode entitled "The Thirteenth Hole" as Colonel Watson. In 1967 he appeared in The Avengers episode entitled "The Superlative Seven" as Max Hardy. He regularly played Inspector Vosper in the BBC radio detective series, Paul Temple.

== Early life ==
Hugh Gardner Manning was born in Birmingham, Warwickshire in 1920 and educated at Moseley Grammar School. He began his career as a trainee accountant, before joining the Birmingham School of Speech and Drama and becoming an actor. He was an active member of the actor's union Equity, serving as its President in 1975, and was an active supporter of the Labour Party.

== Partial filmography ==
- The Dam Busters (1955) - Official, Ministry of Aircraft Production
- The Secret Place (1957) - Sergeant Paynter (uncredited)
- Our Man in Havana (1959) - Officer
- G.I. Blues (1960) - Juggler (uncredited)
- The Honey Pot (1967) - Volpone
- Quatermass and the Pit (1967) - Pub Customer
- The House That Dripped Blood (1971) - Mark (segment 3 "Sweets to the Sweet")
- The Mackintosh Man (1973) - Prosecutor
- Rogue Male (1976) - Peale
- The Elephant Man (1980) - Broadneck
