= Tunnel of Fear =

- The Avengers episode
- Episode no.: Season 1 Episode 20
- Directed by: Guy Verney
- Written by: John Kruse
- Production code: 3417
- Original air date: 5 August 1961

Episode chronology
← Previous "Toy Trap"	Next → "The Far-Distant Dead"

"Tunnel of Fear" is the 20th episode of the first series of the 1960s cult British spy-fi television series The Avengers, starring Ian Hendry, Patrick Macnee and Ingrid Hafner, and guest starring John Salew, Anthony Bate and Miranda Connell. It was recorded on 405-line monochrome videotape on 3 August 1961 and was first broadcast by ABC on 5 August 1961. It is one of the three known complete series 1 episodes to have survived being purged from the ABC archives and was rediscovered in 2016 when it was found in a private collection. The episode was directed by Guy Verney and written by John Kruse.

== Plot ==
Harry Black escapes from prison and appears at Keel's surgery, insisting he was framed for the theft of money from the funfair he worked at. Keel, Steed and Black go to Southend to investigate, uncovering a criminal conspiracy concealed within the ghost train.

== Cast ==
- Ian Hendry as Dr. David Keel
- Patrick Macnee as John Steed
- Ingrid Hafner as Carol Wilson
- Anthony Bate as Harry Black
- Miranda Connell as Claire
- Doris Rogers as Mrs. Mary Black
- John Salew as Jack Wickram
- Douglas Muir as One-Ten
- Douglas Rye as Billy Flowers
- Stanley Platts as Maxie Lardner
- Bill Maxam as George Milner
- Nancy Roberts as Madame Zenobia
- Morris Perry as Police Sergeant
- Julie Samuel as Rosie
- Juno as Puppy

== Recovery ==
On 3 October 2016, it was announced that a pristine condition 16mm film telerecording of the episode had been recovered from a private collector and was later screened in London on 12 November. As of 2025 it is the latest known surviving episode to feature the character of David Keel.
