= Don Leaver =

English television director and producer

- Born: Donald Alfred Leaver; 27 September 1929; London, England
- Died: 13 December 2015 (aged 86); England
- Education: Webber Douglas Academy of Dramatic Art
- Years active: 1960–2000

Don Leaver (27 September 1929 – 13 December 2015) was an English television director and producer, with a career spanning from 1960 to 2000. He was known for The Avengers, A Fine Romance, Mitch, A Touch of Frost and Prime Suspect, but directed or produced many other dramas.

Leaver was born in London, England, his mother dying in childbirth. His father Edward was a chauffeur so Leaver was brought up mainly by his grandmother in Streatham. After training as an actor at the Webber Douglas Academy of Dramatic Art he quickly moved into television production before being invited to direct by Sydney Newman, then with the ITV franchise holder ABC.

Leaver directed The Avengers having already directed its original star, Ian Hendry, in Police Surgeon.

As well as directing and then going on to produce episodes for a large number of TV dramas Leaver also directed television commercials.

Leaver produced the first series of the police procedural series Prime Suspect, for which he won a BAFTA, having been nominated 3 times before without winning.
