= John Steed =

Character in The Avengers

The Hon. John Wickham Gascoyne Beresford Steed MC OM
- The Avengers character
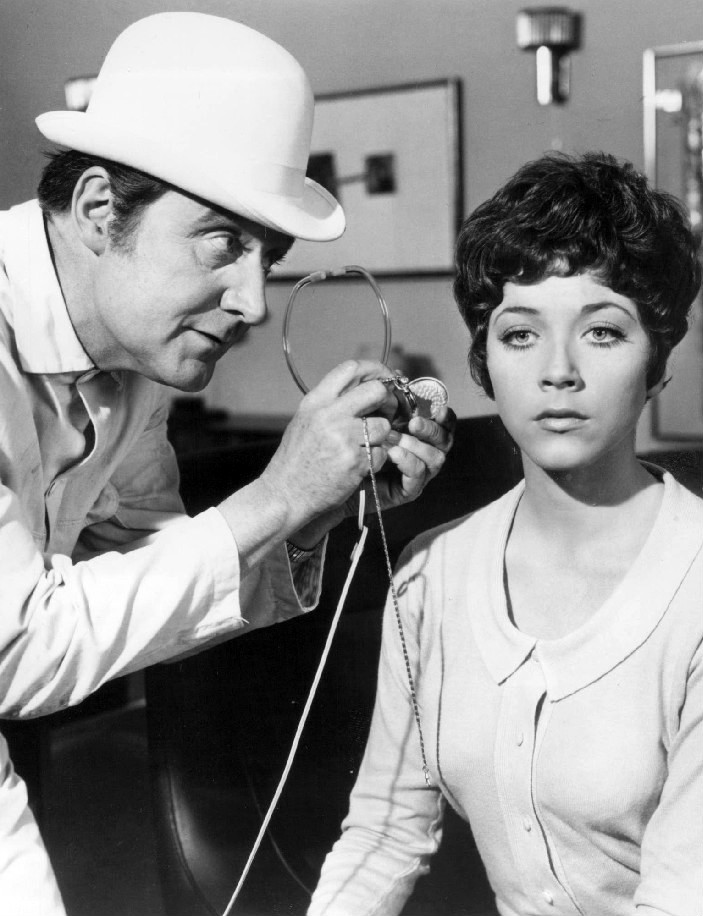
- Macnee as John Steed with Linda Thorson as Tara King, 1968
- First appearance: "Hot Snow", The Avengers episode 1
- Last appearance: "Emily", The New Avengers episode 26; The Avengers (1998 film)
- Created by: Sydney Newman (character); Brian Clemens (background details)
- Portrayed by: Patrick Macnee (series); Donald Monat (radio); Simon Oates (play); Ralph Fiennes (film); Julian Wadham (audio)

In-universe information
- Gender: Male
- Title: Major
- Occupation: Secret agent
- Nationality: English
- Birth date: c.1925
- Birth place: London
- Education: Eton College

Major The Hon. John Wickham Gascoyne Beresford Steed MC OM usually known as John Steed, is a fictional character and the central protagonist on the 1960s British spy series The Avengers and its 1970s sequel The New Avengers, played by Patrick Macnee in both; by Donald Monat in the South-African radio series adaptation of The Avengers; by Ralph Fiennes in the 1998 film of the same name and by Julian Wadham in various audio adventures from Big Finish Productions.

Steed is a secret agent working for an unnamed branch of British intelligence. He was teamed with a variety of partners, including Dr. David Keel (1961), Dr. Martin King (1962), Venus Smith (1962–1963), Cathy Gale (1962–1964), Emma Peel (1965–1968), Tara King (1968–1969), Lady Diana Forbes-Blakeney (1969), Purdey, and Mike Gambit (both 1976–1977).

== Biography ==
=== Pre-Avengers ===
Steed was born John Wickham Gascoyne Beresford Steed sometime between 1922 and 1925 (the actor who played him, Patrick Macnee, was born 1922). A scion of a noble family, Steed attended Eton (like Macnee), where he once got into a fight with the school bully, James Bond, and was eventually expelled (like Macnee). Steed's best friend was Mark Crayford, who later followed him into British Intelligence. However Crayford was always secretly jealous of Steed and later defected to the Soviet Union and attempted to destroy Steed and his legacy.

Steed was a distinguished veteran of World War II, initially serving as a Royal Navy motor torpedo boat commander (like Macnee) but at some point transferring to the Coldstream Guards and then to the Intelligence Corps. He spent the early part of his war service posted at RAF Camp 472 Hamelin, which was a jumping-off point for British spies on the continent. He received the Military Cross for single-handedly taking a German machine-gun post. Before leaving the British Army to join "The Ministry" in 1945, Steed achieved the rank of Major and in it is established he served on courts-martial towards the end of the war. He was also imprisoned by the Japanese at some point over the Christmas period.

In the New Avengers episode "Hostage" he refers to having spent time as a cowboy when he was 21, riding point for the 'Lazy T', on a cattle drive from Arizona to the Black Hills of Dakota.

He maintained a modest mews flat in London during the 1960s (first at 5 Westminster Mews, later at 3 Stable Mews) and drove a variety of elaborate, old-fashioned cars, including a Rolls-Royce and several different models of Bentley, one of which he calls Fido. In one episode also a Vauxhall 30/98 can be seen. By The New Avengers, Steed had moved out to the country, to a manor house known as "Steed's Stud", and was no longer driving vintage cars, but contemporary Jaguars instead.

There are few details regarding his family, although he does refer to an Aunt Penelope (who sends him weighty rock cakes by post) in "Dead Man's Treasure", a 13-year-old nephew in "Legacy of Death" and teenage niece.

=== The Avengers ===
During the first season Steed's character was a more rough-and-tumble operative than the suave, sophisticated gentleman he became during the Gale and Peel eras. His most common style of dress as Dr. Keel's sidekick was a trenchcoat and suit, though the famous bowler hat and umbrella appeared as early as "The Frighteners", the 15th episode to be aired. Most of the first-season episodes are lost, but Macnee hints in his memoir that the bowler and brolly initially appeared earlier. During the show's budget-strained first season, Macnee supplemented his on-screen wardrobe with numerous items from his own wardrobe, including the bowler and umbrella. By the second season, Steed had dispensed with the trenchcoat and was found wearing the familiar three-piece suits with which he is afterward identified.

He was initially shown answering to several different superiors such as "One-Ten" and "Charles". During most of the Gale-Peel era the source of his orders was left a mystery. For the final season of the original series (the Tara King era) Steed was shown taking his orders from an obese man called "Mother" who used a wheelchair (and once from a blind woman named "Father").

In The New Avengers, Steed was shown working on his own, and it was suggested that he had moved into an administrative role in British intelligence, although that did not stop him from directly participating in missions.

Out of all his partners, he was closest to Mrs Peel; while their interaction was often laced with dry, sardonic wit on both sides, he respected her as an equal, and owed her his life on more than a few occasions. Regarding the question of whether they had a sexual relationship at any time, Macnee thought they went to bed on a very regular basis (just not in view of the camera), Rigg thought they were engaged in a very enjoyable extended flirtation that ultimately went nowhere, and Brian Clemens said he wrote them with the idea they'd had an affair before Emma's first appearance in the series.

== Description ==
One of Steed's trademarks was his impeccable dress, often consisting of a three-piece suit, sometimes in styles that harkened back to the early 20th century, along with a trademark bowler hat, and always carried an umbrella. His umbrella, with its distinctive whangee handle, was designed by British umbrella maker Swaine Adeney Brigg. His bowler and umbrella were in fact his favourite weapons. The umbrella contained a concealed sword, though he seldom actually drew the blade, more frequently using the umbrella itself as a striking and hooking weapon. Other specially-equipped umbrellas included one that featured a sound recorder, one with a tip that could emit knock out gas, one with a camera hidden under the handle for covert photography, and one that contained measures of whisky. (The swordstick featured in the title sequence was made by venerable English umbrella maker James Smith & Sons.) The bowler had a metal plate concealed in its lining and was very hard, it could stop bullets and knock down opponents. Although he was witty and highly sagacious, he was also a suave and ruthless spy. In combat, he is an excellent swordsman and adept at unarmed combat. Whilst he does use firearms on occasion he does not habitually carry one (a trait taken from Macnee who disliked them after his wartime service). A bon vivant, he also seemed to be something of an oenophile, having an impeccable palate and a love for champagne. When meeting Tara King, Emma Peel informed her that Steed liked his tea with 3 sugars and stirred anti-clockwise and in the episode "The Morning After" professes to prefer to deal in guineas as currency.
