= Barr (surname) =

Barr is an English, Scottish, and Irish surname, and may refer to:

== People ==
- Adam Barr, American television screenwriter and producer
- Al Barr (born 1968), lead singer of the Dropkick Murphys
- Alfred Barr (1902–1981), American art historian, first director of the Museum of Modern Art in New York City
- Amelia Edith Huddleston Barr (1831–1919), British American novelist
- Andrew Barr (born 1973), Australian politician
- Andrew Barr (musician) (born 1977), drummer with The Sip and The Barr Brothers
- Anthony Barr (American football) (born 1992), American football player
- Anthony James Barr (born 1940), American software engineer
- Billy Barr (footballer) (born 1969), English football player and coach
- Billy Barr (naturalist), famous for collecting 40 years of climate change data
- Bob Barr (born 1948), American politician
- Burton Barr (1917–1997), American politician from Arizona
- Candy Barr (1935–2005) American stripper, burlesque exotic dancer, actress, and model
- Charlie Barr (1864–1911), Scottish sailor
- Colin Barr, Scottish curler
- Daisy Douglas Barr (1875–1938), leader of the Indiana Women's Ku Klux Klan in the early 1920s and member of the Women's Christian Temperance Union
- Darren Barr (born 1985), Scottish football player
- Dave Barr (American football) (born 1972), American football player
- Dave Barr (golfer) (born 1952), Canadian golfer
- Dave Barr (ice hockey) (born 1960), Canadian ice hockey player
- Dave Barr (motorcyclist) (1952–2024), American motorcyclist
- David Barr (politician) (born 1946), Australian politician
- David Barr (Canadian Forces officer) (born 1959), Canadian colonel
- David Barr (English cricketer) (born 1970), English cricketer
- Donald Barr (1921–2004), American science fiction writer and book reviewer
- Donna Barr (born 1952), American comic book author and cartoonist
- Douglas Barr (cricketer) (born 1935), Scottish first class cricketer
- Douglas Barr (born 1949), American actor, writer and director
- Edith Alice Barr (1884–1974), American pioneer, postmaster, and undercover FBI agent
- Edith Barr (1936–2026), Peruvian singer
- Felicity Barr (born 1970), British journalist
- Freeman Barr (born 1973), Bahamian boxer
- Gerry Barr, recipient of the Pearson Medal of Peace
- Glenn Barr (1932–2017), Northern Ireland politician
- Hugh C. Barr (1878–1960), American philatelist
- Jean-Marc Barr (born 1960), French-American film actor and director
- Jeremiah Hess Barr (1876–1955), American philatelist
- Joel Barr (1916–1998), member of the Soviet Atomic Spy Ring
- Julia Barr (born 1949), American actress
- Katherine J. Boskins Barr (1872–1931), American civic leader and nurse
- Kathleen Barr (born 1967), Canadian voice actor
- Leonard Barr (1903–1980), standup American comedian
- Les Barr (born 1953), Scottish football player
- Margaret Barr (choreographer) (1904–1991), Australian dance-drama choreographer
- Mark Barr (1871–1950), American mathematician
- Matt Barr (born 1984), American actor
- Michelle Barr (born 1978), Scottish football player
- Natalie Barr (born 1968), Australian journalist and television presenter
- Nevada Barr (born 1952), American author
- Nick Barr English economist
- Nicky Barr (1915–2006), Australian player and soldier
- Niki Barr, American musician
- Norman B. Barr (1868–1943), founder of Olivet Institute in Chicago
- Patrick Barr (1908–1985), British actor
- Rachel Barr, member of faculty of Georgetown University
- Richard J. Barr (1865–1951), American lawyer and politician
- Robert Barr (born 1978), Scottish field hockey player
- Roseanne Barr (born 1952), American comedian, actress and writer
- Russell Barr (born 1953), minister of the Church of Scotland
- The Barr family of American professional wrestlers:
  - Sandy Barr (1938–2007; born Ferrin Barr), family patriarch; also a promoter
  - Ferrin Barr Jr. (born 1959), older son, known as Jimmy Jack Funk
  - Art Barr (1966–1994), younger son
- Samuel Russell Barr (1914–2001), American businessman and politician
- Steven Barr (born 1962), American pastor and author
- Stringfellow Barr (1897–1982), historian, author and former president of St. John's College in Annapolis, Maryland
- Tara Lynne Barr (born 1993), American actress
- Terry Barr (1935–2009), American football player
- Thomas D. Barr (1931–2008), American lawyer
- William Barr (born 1950), American lawyer and government official
- Woodrow Wilson Barr (1918–1942), American marine
- Yvonne Barr (1932–2016), Irish-born Australian virologist

=== People with the surname Barr and identical first names ===
- David Barr (disambiguation), including Dave Barr
- George Barr (disambiguation)
- James Barr (disambiguation), including Jim Barr
- Joseph Barr (disambiguation), including Joe Barr
- Michael Barr (disambiguation)
  - Mike Barr (disambiguation)
- Robert Barr (disambiguation), including Bob Barr
- Thomas Barr (disambiguation)
- William Barr (disambiguation), including Bill or Billy Barr

== Fictional characters ==
- Dallas Barr, fictional character in the eponymous comic book series by Marvano
- Ducem Barr, fictional character, part of Isaac Asimov's Foundation Series
- Onum Barr, fictional character, part of Isaac Asimov's Foundation Series
- Quinn Armitage and Robert Barr, fictional twin characters appearing in the American soap opera Santa Barbara.

== See also ==
- Barr (disambiguation)
