= David Barr =

David or Dave Barr may refer to:

- David G. Barr (1895–1970), U.S. Army major general
- David Barr (politician) (born 1946), Australian politician
- David Barr (Canadian Forces officer) (born 1959), Canadian military officer
- Dave Barr (American football) (born 1972), American football quarterback
- Dave Barr (golfer) (born 1952), Canadian golfer
- Dave Barr (ice hockey) (born 1960), Canadian ice hockey player
- Dave Barr (motorcyclist) (born 1952), American veteran and motorcyclist who circumnavigated the globe despite having both legs amputated
- David Barr (English cricketer) (born 1970), English cricketer
- David Barr (Irish cricketer) (born 1993), Irish cricketer
- David Barr (playwright), American writer and playwright
- David William Keith Barr, British administrator in India
- Davey Barr (born 1977), Canadian freestyle skier

== See also ==
- David Barr Kirtley (born 1977), American short-story writer
- David Barr Chilton (born 1961), Canadian author
