= List of Coronation Street characters introduced in 1972 =

Among the characters introduced to the British television soap opera Coronation Street in 1972 were Archie Crabtree (brother of Hilda Ogden), Norma Ford, and Deirdre Hunt (subsequently Deirdre Barlow).

== Archie Crabtree ==
Archie Crabtree
- Coronation Street character
- Portrayed by: John Stratton
- First appearance: Episode 1178; 1 May 1972
- Last appearance: Episode 1183; 17 May 1972
- Introduced by: Brian Armstrong
In-universe information
- Father: Arnold Crabtree
- Mother: Florence Crabtree
- Brothers: Norman Crabtree
- Sisters: Hilda Ogden
- Wife: Doris Crabtree
- Nephews: Trevor Ogden; Tony Ogden
- Nieces: Irma Barlow; Sylvia Ogden
- First cousins: Isabel

Archie Crabtree (played by John Stratton) was the brother of Hilda Ogden. Archie came to Coronation Street in May 1972 to look after Hilda while Stan was in hospital recovering from an accident on the lorries. With his beer belly and laziness, Archie could more easily pass as a brother of Stan than of Hilda, and for three weeks he filled Stan's void in Hilda's life.

Archie arrived on the scene just as Hilda decided to give No.13 a facelift which would give it pride of place in the Street. Together, they settled on a porch, complete with hanging baskets. Archie built the porch for Hilda and finished it in less than a week, but there was a last minute snag: planning permission, as Jerry Booth reminded them as they proudly admired their handiwork. Archie went to the Town Hall to sort it out but was unsuccessful and Hilda was told by Councillor Warburton to take the porch down. Shortly after this, the porch disappeared and believing that the council would not just take it, Hilda decided it must have been stolen. However, Archie never got the chance to make good on his threat to turn the thief into mincemeat as shortly thereafter, Hilda received a telegram from the hospital revealing that Stan was on his way home and hence Archie would have to go. Archie suggested that Hilda take another job so that she could look after him and Stan, but one Stan was enough for Hilda.

Despite his belief that a working man was finished by the time he was fifty, Archie went on to see better days. He married Doris some time after his visit to No.13 and by the 1980s owned Crabtree's Chip Shop. Hilda went to stay with Archie in 1973 and in 1981, at which point he had just moved into a new, bigger house, and again in 1982. By 1983, Archie was a widower and not in the best of health. On 16 May of that year, he died of a heart attack. The shop was left to Hilda as Archie's only surviving family and Hilda dealt with the funeral arrangements and had Archie cremated. After Archie's death, there was some question over the nature of his relationship with his assistant Avril Carter, who claimed to be Archie's fiancée and that with his dying breath, he had expressed his desire for her to have the chip shop. Hilda battled Avril for the shop and found that she was having an affair with a married man and said this would be exposed in court, forcing her to back down. Due to Archie's debts, Hilda's inheritance amounted to only £2,000.

== Norma Ford ==
Norma Ford
- Coronation Street character
- Portrayed by: Diana Davies
- Duration: 1972–1974
- First appearance: Episode 1186; 29 May 1972
- Last appearance: Episode 1407; 10 July 1974
- Introduced by: Eric Prytherch (1972); Susi Hush (1974)
In-universe information
- Father: Jacko Ford
- Aunts: Doris

Norma Ford was played by Diana Davies. Norma moved to the street in 1972 and got a job as Maggie Clegg's assistant in the Corner Shop. In 1973, she embarked on a relationship with Ken Barlow, but it did not last long, as he eventually left her for Janet Reid. Shortly after Ken and Janet's wedding, Norma left the area. She came back briefly in 1974 for Maggie's wedding to businessman Ron Cooke and left again after the ceremony.
