= Hadleigh (TV series) =

British TV series or programme (1969–1976)

- Genre: Drama
- Created by: Robert Barr
- Starring: Gerald Harper; Peter Denis; Ambrosine Phillpotts; Alastair Hunter; Hilary Dwyer; Gillian Wray; Gerald James; Jane Merrow; Jenny Twigge; Georgina Melville; Kathy Staff; Peter Sallis; Garfield Morgan; Derek Benfield
- Country of origin: United Kingdom
- Original language: English
- No. of series: 4
- No. of episodes: 52

Production
- Running time: 60 minutes
- Production company: Yorkshire

Original release
- Network: ITV
- Release: September 16, 1969 – May 28, 1976

Related
- Gazette

Hadleigh is a British television series that was produced by Yorkshire Television and originally ran from 1969 to 1976. Developed by Robert Barr, it was a sequel to the writer's earlier Gazette (1968) for the same company. The theme music was composed by Alan Moorhouse and, from series 3, Tony Hatch.

James Hadleigh, played by Gerald Harper, was "the perfect squire, paternalistically careful of his tenantry's welfare, beloved in the village, respected in the council." A "knight in a shining white Aston Martin V8 (actually a Monteverdi 375L), he sets about correcting local injustices". His wife, from a suburban middle-class background, was played by Hilary Dwyer. The series attracted around 17 million viewers at its peak.

== Cast ==
- Gerald Harper as James Hadleigh
- Ambrosine Phillpotts as Lady Helen Hadleigh
- Alastair Hunter as Maxwell (S1, S2)
- Peter Dennis as Sutton (S3, S4)
- Gillian Wray as Susan Jackson (S1)
- Jane Merrow as Anne Hepton (S2)
- Hilary Dwyer as Jennifer Caldwell (S3)
- Jenny Twigge as Joanna Roberts (S4)
- Kathy Staff as Mrs. Brennan (S3)
- Peter Sallis as Dakin, Strapper Starpton (S2, S4)
- Garfield Morgan as Major Smith (S1)
- Derek Benfield as Sergeant Moggs (S1)

== Episodes ==
Gerald Harper appears as James Hadleigh in all 52 episodes.

=== Series 1: 1969 ===
Episode #	Original air date (UK)	Episode title	Guest cast
1-01	16 September 1969	"Thanks for the Offer"	Bill Fraser, Wanda Ventham, Margery Mason, Morris Perry, Anne Kristen, Betty Huntley-Wright
1-02	23 September 1969	"The Wrong Side of the Hill"	Cyril Luckham, Glyn Owen, Roger Booth, Linda Marlowe, Charles Lamb, John Line
1-03	30 September 1969	"An Excellent Thing for the District"	Sue Lloyd, Charles Morgan, Kenneth Watson, John Cazabon
1-04	7 October 1969	"Some You Win, Some You Lose"	Zia Mohyeddin, Harold Goldblatt, Margery Mason, Milo Sperber, Gertan Klauber, Simon Cadell, Elaine Donnelly, David Garth
1-05	14 October 1969	"Patron of the Arts"	Edwin Richfield, Paula Wilcox, Thomas Heathcote, Jeffrey Segal, Christian Rodska
1-06	21 October 1969	"If You Can’t Beat 'Em"	Jon Laurimore, Geoffrey Whitehead, Llewellyn Rees, Richard Goolden
1-07	28 October 1969	"The Ring"	Sydney Tafler, Tim Barrett, Shaun Curry, Peter Welch, Dennis Chinnery, Leon Thau, Jonathan Lynn, Philip Ray, Sidney Vivian, George Little, Denis McCarthy, Alec Ross
1-08	4 November 1969	"The Days of Miuras"	Neil McCallum, Bernard Horsfall, Edward Burnham, Geoffrey Sumner, Clive Cazes, Alan Tucker
1-09	11 November 1969	"A Memory of Time Past"	Moultrie Kelsall, Barbara Couper, Ballard Berkeley, Patrick Waddington, Robert Raglan
1-10	18 November 1969	"Safety of the Realm"	Garfield Morgan, Jonathan Newth, Ivor Dean, Derek Benfield, Robert Cartland, John Owens, Terrance Denville
1-11	25 November 1969	"'M.Y.O.B."	Neil McCallum, John Barron, Geoffrey Sumner, Bernard Horsfall, Rudolph Walker, Roger Brierley, Alan Tucker
1-12	2 December 1969	"For Those in Peril"	Arthur Pentelow, Sheila Fearn, Michael Brennan, Arnold Peters, Caroline Dowdeswell
1-13	9 December 1969	"The Dinner Party"	Penelope Keith, Margery Mason, Brian Badcoe, Joan Newell

=== Series 2: 1971 ===
Episode #	Original air date (UK)	Episode title	Guest cast
2-01	8 January 1971	"Invasion"	Judy Campbell, Joyce Carey, Roland Culver, Mary Peach, Edward Underdown, Moray Watson
2-02	15 January 1971	"Exposure"	Kenneth Cranham, Michael Goodliffe, Bryan Mosley, Peter Sproule, Kenneth Watson
2-03	22 January 1971	"Ring of Fire"	Hannah Gordon, Mike Pratt, George Pravda
2-04	29 January 1971	"Bow to the Lady"	Colin Gordon, Peter Sallis, William Simons
2-05	5 February 1971	"A Quiet Place in the Country"	Norman Bird, Helen Cherry, David Langton
2-06	12 February 1971	"A Letter to David"	Len Jones, Richard Pearson, Leon Vitali
2-07	19 February 1971	"Nicola Penn"	John Bennett, Jill Dixon, Richard Easton
2-08	26 February 1971	"Open Verdict"	John Normington, Anne Stallybrass, Richard Vernon
2-09	5 March 1971	"The Diplomat"	Dawn Addams, Tom Chadbon, Barry Dennen, Carl Duering, Eric Pohlmann, Jack Woolgar
2-10	12 March 1971	"Absolutely Feudal"	Michael Billington, J. G. Devlin, Preston Lockwood, Irlin Hall
2-11	19 March 1971	"The Sealed Offer"	Mae Bacon, Lynne Carol, Peter Copley, William Fox, Eric Longworth, Clive Morton, Ian Sharp, John Stratton, Alan Gerrard
2-12	26 March 1971	"Breakdown"	Roy Barraclough, Michael Billington, Peter Bowles, Basil Henson, Peter Madden, Norma West
2-13	2 April 1971	"Whose Life Is It?"	David Bauer, John Carlisle, Hannah Gordon

Note: Episodes 1, 2, 8, 9 and 13 of series two were shown in monochrome owing to the ITV Colour Strike.

=== Series 3: 1973 ===
Episode #	Original air date (UK)	Episode title	Guest cast
3-01	22 June 1973	"First Impression"	Nigel Hawthorne, Colin Edwynn, Frederick Hall, Donald Sumpter, Robert Hartley, Joseph Greig, Bart Allison
3-02	29 June 1973	"Second Thoughts"	Nigel Hawthorne, Gerald James, Jacqueline Pearce, Kathy Staff, Donald Sumpter
3-03	6 July 1973	"The Last Rent Dinner"	Brian Blessed, Kathy Staff, Stella Tanner, Jack Woolgar
3-04	13 July 1973	"A Tale of Two Paintings"	Anthony Nicholls, Margot Thomas, David Webb
3-05	20 July 1973	"Strained Relations"	Gerald James, Pat Keen
3-06	27 July 1973	"Mrs. Paige"	Peter Madden, Barbara Shelley, Frank Crawshaw
3-07	3 August 1973	"Gentlemen and Players"	Gerald James, Eddie Caswell, David Daker, Richard Hurndall, David Neal, Stuart Wilson, Alan Gerrard, Richard Kane
3-08	10 August 1973	"Mishaps"	Frederick Jaeger, Derek Keller
3-09	17 August 1973	"The Caper"	James Maxwell, Hugh Martin
3-10	24 August 1973	"The Goddaughter"	Rosalie Crutchley, Jenny Twigge, Pauline Jameson
3-11	31 August 1973	"Family Feelings"	Tony Melody, Kathy Staff, Frank Wylie, Rio Fanning
3-12	7 September 1973	"Departure"	Ivor Roberts
3-13	14 September 1973	"Touch and Go"	

=== Series 4: 1976 ===
Episode #	Original air date (UK)	Episode title	Guest cast
4-01	5 March 1976	"The Story of a Panic"	Richard Easton, Peter Ellis, Anthony Higgins, George Innes, Robert McBain, Delena Kidd, Joseph Greig
4-02	12 March 1976	"God Save Us from Moralists"	Mark Dignam, Richard Vernon, Anthony Higgins, Gerald James, Brian Badcoe, Brian Hawksley
4-03	19 March 1976	"Bloodline"	Eric Pohlmann, Irene Prador, John Quayle, Suzanne Roquette, Milo Sperber, Gary Waldhorn, Joseph Greig
4-04	26 March 1976	"Echoes"	Anthony Higgins, Gerald James, Joseph Greig
4-05	2 April 1976	"Divorce"	David Horovitch, Geoffrey Lumsden, Shane Rimmer,
4-06	9 April 1976	"The Charm Factor"	Anthony Higgins, Peter Sallis
4-07	16 April 1976	"Film Story"	Stephanie Beacham, Richard Beale, James Bree
4-08	23 April 1976	"Hong Kong Rock"	Christopher Benjamin, David Waller, Joop Doderer, Nancy Kwan
4-09	30 April 1976	"A House of Gamblers"	Lois Baxter, Richard Gibson, Noel Johnson, Raleigh Gilbert, Joseph Greig
4-10	7 May 1976	"Time Out"	Geoffrey Chater, Patricia Haines, Joanna Dunham, Joan Haythorne, Gerald James
4-11	14 May 1976	"Incident"	Ralph Michael, James Grout
4-12	21 May 1976	"Favours"	Michael Elphick, Gordon Jackson, Myra Frances, Bruce Bould, Diana Davies, David Ryall
4-13	28 May 1976	"Broke"	Michael Aldridge, Myra Frances, Roger Hammond, David Horovitch, Preston Lockwood, John Rolfe, John Woodvine
