= Spy Trap =

British TV drama series (BBC, 1972–1975)

- Starring: Paul Daneman; Prentis Hancock; Michael Gwynn; Julian Glover; Tom Adams
- Theme music composer: Francis Lai
- Country of origin: United Kingdom
- No. of series: 3
- No. of episodes: 61

Original release
- Network: BBC1
- Release: 13 March 1972 – 15 March 1975

Spy Trap is a BBC drama that ran from 1972 to 1975 on BBC1, and was set around 'The Department', a British counter-espionage organisation.

It starred Paul Daneman as Commander Paul Ryan, a naval officer and spy chief, Prentis Hancock as Lieutenant Saunders, and Michael Gwynn as agent Carson. Other regular cast members included Julian Glover as Commander Anderson (first series only) and Tom Adams as Major Sullivan (from the second series). Spy Trap was created by Robert Barr, who also wrote the earlier BBC TV series Spycatcher, and was notable for its complex plot lines.

It ran for three series.

== Synopsis ==
Spy Trap follows the adventures of a team of spies at 'The Department', a British espionage agency responsible for protecting national security. Reporting to the Ministry of Defence, no-nonsense Commander Paul Ryan (Paul Daneman) uses intel discovered by his field agents, to question suspects.

== Main cast ==
- Paul Daneman as Commander Ryan
- Prentis Hancock as Lieutenant Saunders
- Julian Glover as Commander Anderson
- Michael Gwynn as Carson
- Peter Welch as Detective Supt. Clark
- Tom Adams as Major Sullivan
- Eric McCaine as Detective Inspector Williams
- Kevin Stoney as Trent
- Jon Laurimore as Rankin
