= Robert Barr =

Robert Barr or Bob Barr may refer to:

== Sports ==
- Robert Barr (field hockey) (born 1978), Scottish field hockey player
- Robert Barr (footballer) (fl. 1900s), Scottish footballer with Third Lanark
- Bob Barr (1880s pitcher) (1856–1930), Major League Baseball pitcher
- Bob Barr (footballer, born 1865) (1865–1935), Scottish footballer
- Bob Barr (1930s pitcher) (1908–2002), baseball pitcher for the Brooklyn Dodgers
- Bob Barr (Australian footballer) (born 1945), Australian footballer
- Bobby Barr (rugby union) (1907–1975), English rugby union player
- Bobby Barr (footballer) (born 1988), Scottish footballer

== Others ==
- Sir Robert Barr, 1st Baronet (died 1629)
- Robert Barr (Australian politician) (1862–1947)
- Robert Barr (businessman) (1888–1961), British businessman
- Robert M. Barr (1918–1988), American conductor of Jordan High School Band
- Robert Barr, founder of soft drink manufacturer A.G. Barr
- Bob Barr (born 1948), American attorney and 2008 Libertarian Party candidate for President of the United States
- Robert Barr, a character on the American soap opera Santa Barbara
- J. Robert Barr, member of the Illinois House of Representatives
- Robert Barr (writer, born 1849) (1849–1912), British-Canadian novelist
- Robert Barr (writer, born 1909) (1909–1999), Scottish writer

== See also ==
- Barr (surname), other people with the surname Barr
- Barr Tribunal, an Irish public inquiry presided over by Robert Barr
