= James Barr =

James Barr may refer to:

- James Barr (moderator) (1789–1861), Moderator of the General Assembly of the Church of Scotland in 1853
- James Barr (author) (born 1976), British author who writes mainly on the Middle East
- James Barr (biblical scholar) (1924–2006), British Old Testament scholar and philologist
- James Barr (composer) (1779–1860), Scottish composer; composed the tune which inspired that which is now used for "Waltzing Matilda"
- James Barr (physician) (1849–1938), Irish physician
- James Barr (politician) (1862–1949), British Labour Party politician; MP for Motherwell, 1924–1931; Coatbridge, 1935–1945
- James Barr (presenter), British radio and television presenter, LGBT+ activist, creator of podcast A Gay and a NonGay
- James Clayton Barr (1856–1937), Commodore of the Cunard line
- James R. Barr (1884–1910), Scottish engineer and lecturer in Electrical Engineering at Heriot-Watt College, Edinburgh
- Jim Barr (born 1948), American baseball player
- Anthony James Barr (born 1940), also known as Jim Barr, American software engineer

== See also ==
- James Barr Ames (1846–1910), American law educator
- Mark Barr (James Mark McGinnis Barr, 1871–1950), American electrical engineer
- James Fugaté (1922–1995), American author who used the pseudonym James Barr
- James "Jim" Barr, alter ego of the superhero Bulletman from Fawcett Comics
