= Norman Barr =

Norman Barr may refer to:

- Norman B. Barr (1868–1943), American Presbyterian minister
- Norman Barr (priest) (1920–2010), Irish Dean of Connor
