= Bernard Archard =

English actor (1916–2008)

- Archard in 1962
- Born: 20 August 1916; Fulham, London, England
- Died: 1 May 2008 (aged 91); Witham Friary, Somerset, England
- Occupation: Actor
- Years active: 1939–1994
- Partner: James Belchamber

Bernard Joseph Archard (20 August 1916 – 1 May 2008) was an English actor who made many film and television appearances.

== Early life and career ==
Archard was born in Fulham, London, where his father Alfred James Aloysius, who was born in Marylebone, was a jeweller. Bernard's paternal grandfather Alfred Charles Archard and great grandfather Henry Archard were clockmakers, watchmakers and jewellers in Mayfair, London during the 1800s. He was the maternal grandson of James Matthew Littleboy, Mayor of Fulham from 1906 to 1907. He attended the Royal Academy of Dramatic Art, and in summer 1939 he appeared in the Open Air Theatre, Regent's Park production of Twelfth Night. As a conscientious objector during the Second World War, he worked on Quaker land. At the Edinburgh Festival in 1948, in a production of the Glyndebourne Children's Theatre, he met fellow actor James Belchamber, who was his partner for nearly 60 years.

== Television ==
Archard's first major television role, reprising the like-titled radio show, was playing Lt Col. Oreste Pinto in the BBC wartime drama series Spycatcher, which ran for four seasons between 1959 and 1961. His TV guest appearances include two roles in Doctor Who (as Bragen in The Power of the Daleks and as Marcus Scarman in Pyramids of Mars); a regular role in Emmerdale; plus appearances in The Children of the New Forest (the 1964 BBC edition); Dixon of Dock Green; Danger Man; The Avengers; Z-Cars; Paul Temple; Upstairs, Downstairs; Callan; Rumpole of the Bailey; Crown Court; The Professionals; Bergerac; Sir Francis Drake and Keeping Up Appearances.

== Film ==
Archard appeared in over fifty films, including Village of the Damned (1960), The List of Adrian Messenger (1963), Play Dirty (1968), Run a Crooked Mile (1969), The Horror of Frankenstein (1970), Roman Polanski's Macbeth (1971), Dad's Army (1971), The Day of the Jackal (1973), The Sea Wolves (1980), Krull (1983) and King Solomon's Mines (1985).

== Stage ==
Archard and his long term partner, James Belchamber, ran a touring repertory company, based in Torquay, which included Hilda Braid among its players. On the West End stage he appeared at Her Majesty's Theatre as a magistrate in the Terence Rattigan play Cause Célèbre and in The Case of the Oily Levantine by Anthony Shaffer.

== Filmography ==
Year	Title	Role	Notes
1957	A Woman of Property	Dr. Pickford	TV movie
1958	Black Furrow	Harper	Documentary
1958	The Diary of Samuel Pepys	Master Moore	2 episodes
1958	Mary Britten, M.D.	Councillor Pyke	5 episodes
1958	The Secret Man	Inspector	
1958	Corridors of Blood	Hospital Official	
1960	Village of the Damned	Vicar	
1960	Danger Man	Doctor Bryant	Episode: The Leak
1961	The Clue of the New Pin	Superintendent Carver	
1961	Two Letter Alibi	Duke	
1961	Man Detained	Detective Inspector Verity	
1962	The Second Mrs Tanqueray	Cayley Drummie	TV movie
1962	A Sheep in Wolf's Clothing	Barney Fincham	TV movie
1962	The Password Is Courage	1st Prisoner of War	
1962	Flat Two	Trainer	
1963	The List of Adrian Messenger	Inspector Pike	
1963	Silent Playground	Inspector Duffy	
1964	Edgar Wallace Mysteries	Michael Forrest	Face of a Stranger episode
1965-1968	The Avengers	Desmond Leeming/Dr. Constantine	2 episodes
1966/1975	Doctor Who	Bragen/Marcus Scarman	10 episodes
1966	The Spy with a Cold Nose	Russian Intelligence Chief	
1968	The Mini-Affair	Sir Basil Grinling	
1968-1970	Mystery and Imagination	Professor Van Helsing/The President	2 episodes
1969	Play Dirty	Colonel Homerton	
1969	The File of the Golden Goose	Collins	
1969	Tower of London: The Innocent	Earl of Oxford	TV movie
1969	Run a Crooked Mile	Business Spokesman	TV movie
1970	Fragment of Fear	Priest	
1970	Song of Norway	George Nordraak	
1970	The Horror of Frankenstein	Professor Heiss	
1971	Dad's Army	Major General Fullard	
1971	The Rivals of Sherlock Holmes	Dr. Davidson	Episode: A Message from the Deep Sea
1971	Macbeth	Angus	
1972	The Adventures of Black Beauty	Bulov	Episode: The Duel
1973	The Day of the Jackal	Detective Hughes	
1973	Upstairs, Downstairs	Col Harry Tewksbury	Episode: What the Footman Saw
1974	Crown Matrimonial	Geoffrey Dawson	TV movie
1975	The Hiding Place	Lieutenant Rahms	
1975	The Legend of Robin Hood	Sir Richard of the Lea	Miniseries
1976	Smuga Cienia	Captain Elis	
1977	Philby, Burgess and Maclean	Graves	TV movie
1979	Churchill and the Generals	Edward, Lord Halifax	TV movie
1980	'Tis Pity She's a Whore	Donado	TV movie
1980	The Sea Wolves	Underhill	
1980	A Tale of Two Cities	Court President	TV movie
1982	Inside the Third Reich	Dr. Hans Flachsner	TV movie
1983	Separate Tables	Mr. Fowler	
1983	Krull	Eirig	
1983	Al-Mas' Ala Al-Kubra	Sir Percy Cox	
1983	Number 10	Duke of Wellington	
1985	King Solomon's Mines	Professor Huston	Uncredited
1986	God's Outlaw	Sir Thomas More	
1990	Hidden Agenda	Sir Robert Neil	
1991	Keeping Up Appearances	Hotel Guest	Episode: Golfing with the Major
1992-1994	Emmerdale	Leonard Kempinski	23 episodes
