= Albert French =

American author and publisher

Albert French (born 1943) is an American author and publisher whose works, mainly focusing on the rural life of African Americans, are known for their intensity and distinctive style, and have been translated into several languages.

== Early life ==
French was born in Pittsburgh, Pennsylvania in 1943 and still lives there. He joined the United States Marine Corps in 1963. His experiences there are described in his book Patches of Fire. After returning home, French worked as a photographer for the Pittsburgh Post-Gazette before publishing the Pittsburgh Preview for twelve years.

== Books ==
- Billy (1995)
- Patches of Fire (1996),
- Holly (1996),
- I Can't Wait on God (1999)
- Cinder (2007).

French's works Billy, Holly and Cinder all describe rural African American life in the South while I Can't Wait on God is centered in Pittsburgh. His first novel, Billy, was favorably reviewed by the New York Daily News and the Los Angeles Times Billy was adapted for the stage by David Barr and first performed by the Chicago Theatre Company in February 2007.

French was asked by the Royal Book Club to write a foreword for To Kill a Mockingbird.
