= Barr =

Barr may refer to:

== Places ==
- Barr (placename element), element of place names meaning 'wooded hill', 'natural barrier'
- Barr, Ayrshire, a village in Scotland
- Barr Building (Washington, DC), listed on the US National Register of Historic Places
- Barr Castle, ruin in Renfrewshire, Scotland
- Barr Castle, in Galston, East Ayrshire, Scotland
- Barr, Bas-Rhin, a commune of the Bas-Rhin département in France
- Barr Township, Daviess County, Indiana, US
- Barr Township, Cambria County, Pennsylvania, US

== Companies ==
- A.G. Barr, a Scottish soft drinks manufacturer
- Barr Construction Ltd, a Scottish construction company
- Barr Pharmaceuticals, a generic drug manufacturer that was acquired by Teva Pharmaceutical in 2008

== People ==
- Barr (surname)
- Barr McClellan (born 1939), American author
- Brendan Fowler (born 1978), a.k.a. BARR, American musician
- Barr (tribe), a people in southwest Asia

== Other uses ==
- Barr body, the inactive chromosome in a somatic cell
- Al-Barr, one of the names of God in Islam

== See also ==
- Barre (disambiguation)
- Bar (disambiguation)
