= Bruce Bromley =

American lawyer and politician (1893–1980)

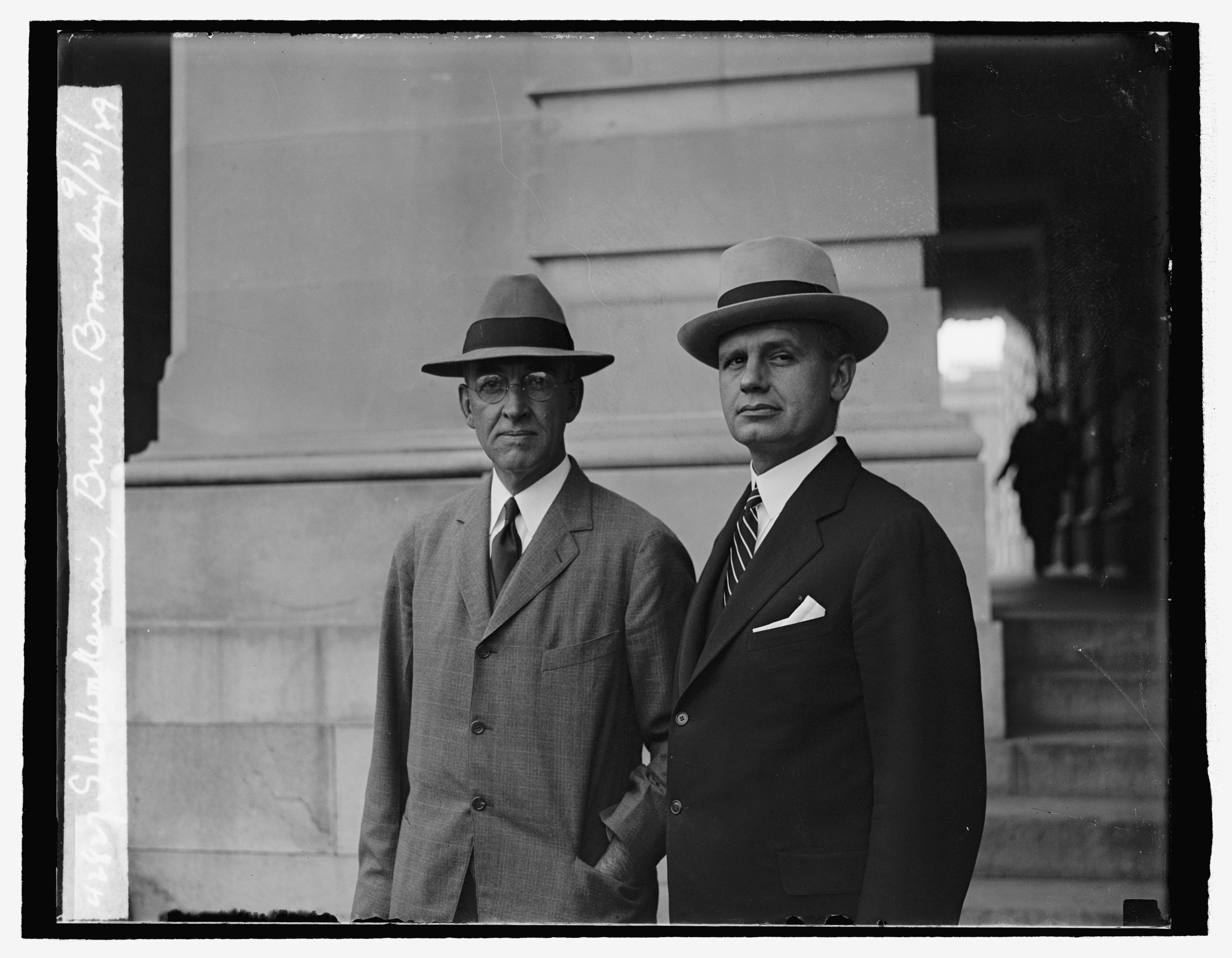
- Bromley (right) in 1929
- Born: March 20, 1893; Pontiac, Michigan
- Died: January 29, 1980 (aged 86); Manhattan, New York City
- Education: Harvard Law School; University of Michigan
- Occupation: Lawyer
- Employer: Cravath, Swaine & Moore

Bruce Ditmas Bromley (March 20, 1893 – January 29, 1980) was an American lawyer and politician.

== Life ==
He was the son of Peter Brewster Bromley (1861–1926) and Sarah Suydam (Ditmas) Bromley (1857–1936). He graduated from the University of Michigan in 1914, and then entered Harvard Law School, but left to serve in the U. S. Navy during World War I. He left the Navy in 1919 as a lieutenant. He received his law degree from Harvard after the war, was admitted to the bar in 1920, and commenced practice in New York City as assistant to Henry L. Stimson. In 1923, he joined the law firm that is now known as Cravath, Swaine & Moore, and stayed with it for more than 50 years. While at Cravath, he won big cases for IBM, Westinghouse Electric, Bethlehem Steel, General Motors, Esquire magazine, and other corporate giants.

On January 14, 1949, he was appointed by Governor Thomas E. Dewey to the New York Court of Appeals, to fill the vacancy caused by the resignation of Thomas D. Thacher. In November 1949, he was defeated by Democrat Charles W. Froessel when running for a full term.

In 1969, he appeared for the U.S. House of Representatives in the U.S. Supreme Court case of Powell v. McCormack, in which Congressman Adam Clayton Powell Jr. questioned his exclusion from the House.

Bromley died at the New York Hospital—Cornell Medical Center.

A law chair at Harvard Law School is named after him. Among Bruce Bromley Professors of Law were Arthur R. Miller and Paul M. Bator. The current holder is William Rubenstein.

== See also ==
- Thomas D. Barr, a Cravath lawyer who ran the IBM case for 13 years
