= Gazette (TV series) =

1968 British TV series

- Genre: Drama
- Created by: Robert Barr
- Starring: Gerald Harper; Jon Laurimore; Gillian Wray; Ralph Michael
- Country of origin: United Kingdom
- Original language: English
- No. of series: 1
- No. of episodes: 13

Production
- Producers: Elwyn Jones; Terence Williams
- Running time: 60 minutes
- Production company: Yorkshire Television

Original release
- Network: ITV
- Release: 2 August – 25 October 1968

Related
- Hadleigh

Gazette is a British television series that first aired on ITV in 1968. It starred Gerald Harper as James Hadleigh, a millionaire who relocates from London to Yorkshire and buys a local newspaper founded by his father many years before. The cast also included Jon Laurimore, Ralph Michael and Gillian Wray. Harper had just come off his starring role in the BBC series Adam Adamant Lives.

The show was made by Yorkshire Television and was popular with audiences. Although a second series of Gazette was initially planned, it was instead decided to launch a follow-up called Hadleigh which focused on the title character in his role as a local landowner. Laurimore and Wray also returned for the spin-off, the former for a single guest appearance and the latter in a recurring capacity. This ran for four series between 1969 and 1976.

== Cast ==
- Gerald Harper as James Hadliegh
- Jon Laurimore as Frank Walters
- Gillian Wray as Susan Jackson
- Michael Blackham as Bill Spence
- Ralph Michael as Colonel Chamberlayne

== Bibliography ==
- Tise Vahimagi. British Television: An Illustrated Guide. Oxford University Press, 1996.
