= Roger Godberd =

13th-century English outlaw

Roger Godberd (fl. 13th century) was an English outlaw who has been suggested as a possible historical basis for the legend of Robin Hood. Godberd's criminal history is often compared with the Robin Hood legend since some minor details align with the famous story.

Godberd lived during the 13th century around the Leicestershire area and traveled throughout England as an outlaw committing crimes with a group of bandits. Roger lived in a time when there was criticism towards King Henry III and King Edward I for leaving the royal finances in disarray and taxing the townspeople, which made many commoners unhappy. Henry III's reign has been associated with stories of outlawry and is seen as a more plausible setting for the ballads of Robin Hood. Henry III's reign led to the Second Barons' War and the seizure of power by Simon de Montfort, whom Godberd served under until Simon was killed in battle in 1265.

Godberd has been thought to be Robin Hood for various reasons, including perceived similarities between the battles they fought in and the ways they committed their crimes. The nickname or surname 'Robinhood' appeared before the end of the 13th century, with the name 'Hood' later becoming common and combined with names like Robert Hood. The stories of Robin Hood themselves provide little detail connecting them with real-life people or events. This does not mean that the stories were not based on a real person, but rather that whoever was the chief inspiration for Robin Hood was likely not a person of standing in the public eye.

== Life ==
Roger Godberd was born at the beginning of the 1230s and died in the early 1290s at around 60 years of age. He had at least two brothers named William and Geoffrey but not much is recorded about the two. His father died early in his life and his mother remarried after his death to a man named Anketil de Swaninton. Roger was a tenant of Robert de Ferrers, who had held land at Swannington in northwest Leicestershire. His stepfather and mother took possession over the family's holdings and in the 1250s cut down all 60 oak trees on their property to make money. Roger was reportedly unhappy with this decision and felt his family had wasted his inheritance, leading him to stand up for himself against his parental figures. Roger was thought to have been married, though his wife's name is unknown. There is some speculation that he married a woman from the neighboring Thringstone family. He had at least two children, one son named Roger and one daughter named Diva.

In 1260, Roger was involved in another dispute regarding land. He had leased Swannington manor to a Jordan le Fleming for ten years, but within 12 months had forcibly removed him from the property. Roger was supposed to appear in court for this incident and to respond to Jordan's complaints but did not. He was prepared to act illegally and recruit others in order to resort to violence to solve the complaints brought by Jordan. The reason behind him leasing his land is still unknown but some have suggested that it was because he became a member of the garrison of Nottingham Castle sometime in the late 1250s to early 1260s, and that his new military responsibilities kept him from running the property properly, so he leased it to Jordan le Fleming while he was away. Because of Roger's association with the garrison, he received protection for his family that allowed him to go back to his lands until Easter with the condition that he would stand trial in the King's court if anyone were to claim he trespassed. It was thought that this was because of his dispute with Jordan le Fleming but others suggest it was because of his association with the Battle of Lewes that took place in 1264.

Roger Godberd's life was spent living under the rule of Henry III and eventually Edward I. When Edward I was ruling over England, there was temporary harmony that brought the king and his people together, but it did not integrate both sides together. This eventually led to the decay of feudal rights and saw an increase in unhappiness with the people living under the king. Godberd served under Simon de Montfort, the 6th Earl of Leicester, as well as two other barons. Simon de Montfort had captured Henry III but soon was faced with trouble when Simon's young followers began to form rifts due to disputes over ransoms of captured people. Simon de Montfort was later killed in the Battle of Evesham on 4 August 1265 by Edward I for going against the King of England. Later in 1265, Godberd was outlawed for fighting against Henry III in this battle. Nearly two centuries later, in about 1446, Walter Bowerclaimed that Robin Hood also became an outlaw as a result of this battle. This has led some to speculate that there may have been a connection between Robin Hood and Roger Godberd.

Godberd ultimately evaded capture but continued to behave in a lawless manner. Although he was still committing crimes, he along with five other men were summoned to court and granted safe conduct so long as they came within the next eight days; this was on 14 November. This was to ‘treat of peace for themselves and those in their company'. Most of the men appeared in the court besides Godberd, who was given an extension of a grace period for him to go into court. His grace period was extended to 30 November with his original date being 14 November. It is unknown whether Godberd was hesitant to submit or if he was kept away by other circumstances, but his reasoning for not showing up on his grace period is still a mystery. Eventually, on 10 December, Godberd and his brother William were finally pardoned. However, Godberd's pardon did not come without a price. Godberd was given back his land but his financial status would take some time to repair.

Roger disappeared for a few years after 1266 and not much is known about what he did in those years. It was thought that he had been laying low and farming to pay off the past debts that he owed. One peculiar detail is the fact that a group of Nottinghamshire rebels who had been resisting authorities were found to be staying on his property. There has been some speculation that he settled in Sherwood Forest where he lived and continued to defy authorities and commit crimes. This is the same forest in which the famous Robin Hood tales are set. Reginald de Grey was the Sheriff of Nottingham at this time. Godberd was captured on the grounds of Rufford Abbey, and from there taken to Nottingham Castle, but managed to escape. A prominent local knight named Richard Foliot helped Godberd and his fellow fugitives and protected them from the Sheriff.

In the 1270s Godberd was leading a band of outlaws through many counties into Wiltshire causing all sorts of commotion. Some of the crimes that he and his group of outlaws were accused of committing include burglaries, murders, arson, and robberies. Godberd's most violent crime was an attack on Stanley Abbey in which he reportedly stole a large amount of money and killed one of the monks who lived there. Roger proclaimed his innocence and argued that he had been loyal to his King since he had been previously pardoned in December 1266. The allegations presented against Roger would have led to the death penalty, resulting in him denying the claims to avoid punishment.

Later in 1270, Foliot's Castle Fenwick was besieged by royal troops under the command of Reginald de Grey, who intended to capture Godberd and his companions, but the outlaws managed to flee before the Sheriff's arrival. In 1272, Foliot was accused of protecting Godberd and forced to surrender Fenwick. This knight resembles the figure of Richard at the Lee in the ballads of the Robin Hood story.

Godberd was eventually captured and sent to jail. He was kept in three different prisons over three years while awaiting his trial, which took place at the Tower of London and at which he was pardoned upon the return of Edward I from the Ninth Crusade. He returned to his farm and lived there until his death. However, according to the Oxford Dictionary of National Biography, Godberd died in Newgate Prison in 1276.
