= Jenny Twigge =

British actress (born 1950)

Jenny Twigge (born 19 January 1950) is a British actress who studied at the Royal Scottish Academy of Music and Drama, Glasgow. She was a patron of animal rescue group All Dogs Matter.

== Television ==
Twigge played Anne in Granada TV's The Web in 1972. She played Rosetta in a 1973 BBC2 adaptation of Two Women and appeared in Roy Clarke's That Sinking Feeling (Armchair Theatre, 1973). She made numerous one-off appearances in 1970s TV series including Love Story (1972, directed by Moira Armstrong), Kate (1972), Softly, Softly: Task Force (1972), Crown Court (two separate characters in 1973), New Scotland Yard (1974), Dixon of Dock Green episode Question In The House (1974), Z-Cars (1976), and Lurena in Blake's 7 (1979). Then in 1980 she played Caroline Onedin in the last four episodes of series 8 of The Onedin Line and was in one episode of The Professionals. Later, she played Rachel Ashbourne in episode 78 of The Bill (series 13), first aired in 1997.

Longer term, Twigge appeared regularly in General Hospital (Dr. Cathy Waddon from 1974–75), Hadleigh (Hadleigh's god-daughter Joanna Roberts in 1973 and throughout 1976), Rooms (Carol West throughout 1977, starring alongside Ian Redford and Anne Dyson), ITV comedy series Thicker than Water (1981), Grange Hill (Mrs. McGuire from 1982–87), and Byker Grove (playing Clare Warner from 1989–90).

In 2009, Twigge appeared as herself in The Lonely Man on the Hill in which Hadleigh cast members talked through their recollections of the series.

== Film ==
Her film appearances include Robert Young's Hammer film Vampire Circus (1972) (as a schoolgirl), Judith in Bob Kellett's Our Miss Fred (1972), Millie in Gerry O'Hara's The Brute (1977), and as an air hostess in Alberto De Martino's Holocaust 2000 (1977). In The Brute, the New Statesman described her performance as "thoroughly decent".

== Radio ==
In 1979, Twigge played alongside Alfred Marks, Polly James, Hugh Paddick and Fenella Fielding in Aladdin. In the same year she played Anne in A Dance to the Music of Time on BBC Radio 4 and was in Elizabeth Gowan's Partnership Limited in Radio 4's Thirty-minute Theatre strand. In 1980, she starred with Trevor Cooper in Paul Bryers' The File On Leo Kaplan, originally broadcast in the Saturday Night Theatre strand on 12 January 1980. In the same year, she appeared in Brecht’s play The Caucasian Chalk Circle on BBC Radio 3 and was Jill Mason in an adaptation of Peter Shaffer's Equus, first broadcast in March 1980.

== Stage ==
Twigge played Perdita in The Winter's Tale at the Ludlow Festival in 1973. She played Carol in Time and the Conways at the Manchester Royal Exchange in 1974. She played Beppi in Franz Xaver Kroetz's Geisterbahn at the Bush Theatre in 1976. In 1977, she appeared as "Yuki" with Wolfe Morris in The Golden Country by Shusaku Endo, directed by Richard Negri at the Royal Exchange, Manchester.
