= Verysdale =

Verysdale is a part of medieval England which is mentioned in the early ballads of Robin Hood (especially the ballad A Gest of Robyn Hode, in which a friendly knight, Richard at the Lee, befriends the gallant outlaw and later is revealed as the lord or Earl of Verysdale). Verysdale may be entirely fictional, or it may be based upon a real county with some basis in geographical reality, or it may even have been a term used to refer to a real county. Scholars and historians are divided as to this, as well as the exact supposed location of Verysdale.

Some believe the location of Verysdale was somewhere in the Peak District (the ballad would seem to suggest so), although there are many suggestions and theories. Locations in West Yorkshire, South Yorkshire, Nottinghamshire, Derbyshire, Lancashire, and Cumbria have all been suggested. One scholar equated Verysdale with Wensleydale whilst another equated it with Kirklees.

Also mentioned in the same ballad was "Uterysdale", which has been identified by some as relating to the village of Lee in the Wyre valley - Wyresdale (Lancashire) and references to Richard de Leghs [Leghe] in Lancashire to one in the village of Woodhouses (since 1974 in Greater Manchester) during the early 13th century. This bears a similarity to the title "Richard at the Lee" who is said to have been the lord of Verysdale.

== See also ==
- Robin Hood
- Richard at the Lee
