= Oreste Pinto =

Dutch counterintelligence officer (1889–1961)

Oreste Pinto (9 October 1889, Amsterdam – 18 September 1961, London) was a Dutch counterintelligence officer and Lieutenant-Colonel. His activities during the Second World War, in which he worked with MI5 interrogating refugees to England and the Free Dutch Government Politie Buitendienst (Foreign Police Service), resulted in the capture of eight spies.

His most famous spy-catch was the "King Kong" affair: the pursuit and arrest of Christiaan Lindemans, known as "King Kong," a Dutch resistance member who became a double agent working for German intelligence and has been linked to the failure of the intelligence preceding Operation Market Garden at Arnhem.

== Early life and career ==
Oreste Pinto was born in Amsterdam in 1889, the youngest child of Louis Pinto, a successful businessman, and Abigael Rozenboom. After military service he studied French literature at the Sorbonne in Paris. He was a proficient linguist, being fluent in Dutch, English, French and German, and could get by in Spanish, Portuguese, Danish, Swedish, Norwegian, Romanian and Swahili.

=== Career in the French intelligence ===
Pinto's career in intelligence began in 1913, when he was recruited by the Deuxième Bureau, France's external military intelligence agency, and he worked for them during World War I, initially as a spy.

=== World War Two ===
In the years leading up to the Second World War, Pinto was approached by MI5. He did not officially join the service, as doing so would have meant losing his Dutch citizenship, but was employed independently, during the Second World War as an MI5 interrogator. He interviewed over 30 000 immigrants to the UK at the euphemistically named "London Reception Centre" in the Royal Victoria Patriotic Building in Wandsworth.

=== After the war ===
In 1952, Pinto published two books, Spy-Catcher and Friend or Foe? These formed the basis of the 1959-1961 BBC television series Spycatcher, and also an earlier BBC Radio series, in both of which he was portrayed by Bernard Archard. A further book, Spycatcher 2, based on the series, was published in 1960. The 1962 Dutch programme De Fuik, in which Pinto was portrayed by Frits Butzelaar, was also derived from them.

Spy-catcher was translated in French under the title of Chasseur d'espions.

== Honours ==
Dwight Eisenhower once described Pinto as "the greatest living authority on security". The Daily Telegraph referred to him as a "human bloodhound". Conversely, Guy Liddell stated in 1942 that he had been told by Leonard Burt that Pinto had "a thoroughly bad record".

He characterised himself as basically a generalist, with a knack for learning languages, skill in boxing and shooting ("I managed to reach amateur international standard"), and being an excellent bridge player and a "local" zoologist.

He died in Westminster Hospital London, a few weeks before his 72nd birthday, of chronic bronchitis.

== Works ==
- Spy-Catcher. Werner Laurie, 1952
- Friend or Foe? Werner Laurie, 1953
- Spycatcher Omnibus Hodder and Stoughton, 1962
- Spycatcher 2. Four Square, 1963
- Spycatcher 3. Four Square, 1967
