= Katherine J. Barr =

American nurse and community leader

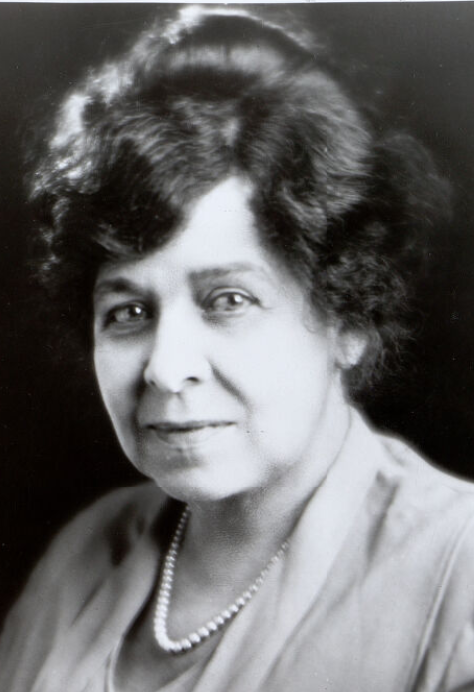
- Katherine J. Barr, from a 1920 photo
- Born: 1871/1872; Montgomery, Alabama, U.S.
- Died: November 29, 1931; Los Angeles, California, U.S.
- Other name: Kittie Baskins
- Occupation: Community leader
- Spouse: Elmer Elsworth "E.E." Barr (m. 1894)
- Relatives: Elmer Barr

Katherine Juanita Boskins Barr (née Boskins; 1871/1872 – November 29, 1931) was an American nurse and community leader based in Los Angeles. She was the founder and first executive secretary of the Los Angeles Urban League.

== Early life and education ==
Katherine (sometimes spelled "Catherine") Juanita Boskins (sometimes spelled "Baskins") was born in Montgomery, Alabama, the daughter of Mary J. Davis. She graduated from Tuskegee Institute in 1891. She trained as a nurse at Provident Hospital in Chicago.

== Career ==
Boskins supervised the laundry facilities at Tuskegee as a young woman. In 1901, as a young widow with a small son to support, she returned to nursing in Los Angeles. She was active in the Tuskegee Club of Los Angeles, and secretary of the Booker Washington Memorial fund in 1916. In 1917, she opened an employment agency for Black workers in Los Angeles.

Barr's agency became part of the Tuskegee Industrial Welfare League in 1921, and that soon became the Los Angeles Urban League. She was the League's first executive secretary. Under her leadership, jobs continued to be a priority of the League. For example, she announced that the League successfully negotiated with a store chain to hire more Black clerks, and with a taxi company to hire more Black supervisors. The League also helped arrange hotel accommodations and transportation for conference attendees in the city, and ran a summer camp for mothers and children, at a time when few other city agencies addressed the recreation needs of Black families.

Barr also owned a ranch in Monrovia, California. After her death, Floyd Covington became executive director of the Los Angeles Urban League, serving in this role from 1931 to 1950.

== Personal life ==
Katherine Boskins married physician Elmer Elsworth "E.E." Barr on August 19, 1894 in Chicago. They had a son, Elmer (born 1895). E.E. Barr died from tuberculosis in 1901. She died on November 29, 1931.
