= Gerald Harper =

English actor (1929–2025)

- Born: 15 February 1929; Barnet, Hertfordshire, England
- Died: 2 July 2025 (aged 96)
- Education: Haileybury
- Alma mater: RADA
- Occupation: Actor
- Spouses: Jane Downs (m. 1957; div. 1975) Carla Rabaiotti (m. 1976; div. 1983)
- Children: 2

Gerald Harper (15 February 1929 – 2 July 2025) was an English actor, best known for his work on television, having played the title roles in Adam Adamant Lives! (1966–67) and Hadleigh (1969–76). He then returned to his main love, the theatre. His classical work includes playing on Broadway with the Old Vic company, playing Iago at the Bristol Old Vic and Benedick at the Chichester Festival Theatre. Other plays in London included The Crucifer of Blood at the Haymarket Theatre, House Guest, A Personal Affair, Suddenly at Home and Baggage. He directed many plays, amongst them a production of Blithe Spirit in Hebrew at the Israeli National Theatre.

== Early life ==
Harper was born in Barnet, Hertfordshire on 15 February 1929. He originally wanted to be a doctor, but became interested in acting while still at school. He was educated at Haileybury. After two years of national service in the Royal Artillery as a second lieutenant, he decided to abandon his medicine course at Cambridge University and successfully auditioned for RADA. He started in the London Arts Theatre followed by Liverpool Playhouse, before returning to London to perform in Charley's Aunt with Frankie Howerd.

== Career ==
Harper's film credits include The Admirable Crichton (1957), A Night to Remember (1958), The League of Gentlemen (1960), Tunes of Glory (1960), The Young Ones (1961), The Punch and Judy Man (1963), The Shoes of the Fisherman (1968) and The Lady Vanishes (1979). Television work included The Sleeper, The Corsican Brothers and Gazette.

He also had roles in Free as Air and Ross and toured in the United States with the Old Vic and Boeing-Boeing. He toured the country in 2008 as the lead in Agatha Christie's And Then There Were None directed by Joe Harmston for producer Bill Kenwright. He also played one of the barristers in The Baccarat Scandal at Chichester Festival Theatre which starred Keith Michell.

Harper also presented radio programmes, including The Sunday Affair for Capital Radio in the 1970s. He starred in the radio serialisation of Prudence by Jilly Cooper in 1979, alongside Felicity Kendal. There was also a series of Saturday afternoon shows for BBC Radio 2 in the late 1980s and early 1990s, in which he played classic songs from the past and gave away bottles of champagne and chocolates. His opening phrase, usually spoken over the introduction of the first song, was "Hello....I'm Gerald Harper. Welcome to my Saturday selection". The radio show was resurrected for Talksport between 2002 and 2003, and re-titled Champagne and Roses.

== Personal life and death ==
Harper married actress Jane Downs in 1957. The marriage produced one child. The couple divorced in 1975. He married Carla Rabaiotti, a former Pan American air stewardess in 1976. The marriage produced one child. The couple divorced in 1983.

In 2001, when he was in his early seventies, he began a relationship with 30-year-old actress Sarah Alexander; the relationship ended when she left him for actor Peter Serafinowicz in 2002.

Harper died on 2 July 2025, at the age of 96, after being diagnosed with Parkinson's disease.

== Selected filmography ==
=== Film ===
Year	Title	Role	Notes
1955	The Dam Busters	Mocking RAF Officer	uncredited
1956	Tiger in the Smoke	Duds Morrison	
1956	Stars in Your Eyes	Dicky	
1956	The Extra Day	Police Constable	
1957	The Admirable Crichton	Ernest	
1958	A Night to Remember	3rd Officer, SS Carpathia	
1960	The League of Gentlemen	Captain Saunders	
1960	Tunes of Glory	Major Hugo Macmillan	
1961	The Young Ones	Watts	
1963	The Punch and Judy Man	1st Drunk	
1964	Wonderful Life	Sheik / Scotsman / Harold	
1965	Strangler's Web (Edgar Wallace Mysteries)	Inspector Murray	
1965	Up Jumped a Swagman	Publicity Man	
1968	The Shoes of the Fisherman	Brian	
1979	The Lady Vanishes	Todhunter	

=== Television ===
Year	Title	Role	Notes
1964	The Sleeper	Peter Dibden	6 episodes
1965	A Man Called Harry Brent	Detective Inspector Alan Milton	6 episodes
1966	A Game of Murder	Detective Inspector Jack Kerry	6 episodes
1966-1967	Adam Adamant Lives!	Adam Adamant	29 episodes
1968	City '68	Roy Swift	Episode: "The Jonah Site"
1968	Gazette	James Hadleigh	9 episodes
1968	The Champions	Croft	Episode: "The Fanatics"
1969-1976	Hadleigh	James Hadleigh	52 episodes
1975	Thriller	Greg Miles	Episode: "If It's a Man - Hang Up!"
1978	The Flockton Flyer	Master of Foxhounds	Episode: "A Question of Honour"
