= 1949 New York state election =

- November 8, 1949

The 1949 New York state election was held on November 8, 1949, to elect a judge of the New York Court of Appeals and a U.S. senator.

== Background ==
On November 18, 1948, Thomas D. Thacher resigned from the New York Court of Appeals. On January 14, 1949, Bruce Bromley was appointed by Governor Thomas E. Dewey to fill the vacancy temporarily.

On June 28, 1949, Robert F. Wagner resigned from the U.S. Senate, due to ill health. On July 7, John Foster Dulles was appointed by Governor Dewey to fill the vacancy temporarily.

== Nominations ==
The Republican State Committee nominated the incumbents Dulles and Bromley to succeed themselves.

The Democratic State Committee nominated Ex-Governor Herbert H. Lehman (in office 1933–1942) for the U.S. Senate and Supreme Court Justice Charles W. Froessel for the Court of Appeals.

The Liberal Party endorsed the Democratic nominees Lehman and Froessel.

The American Labor Party made no nominations and urged its members not to vote for any candidate.

== Result ==
The Democratic/Liberal ticket was elected. The incumbents Dulles and Bromley were defeated.

1949 state election result
Office	Democratic		Republican		Liberal	
Judge of the Court of Appeals	Charles W. Froessel	2,072,839	Bruce Bromley	2,004,726	Charles W. Froessel	352,975
U.S. Senator	Herbert H. Lehman	2,149,347	John Foster Dulles	2,377,641	Herbert H. Lehman	426,351

== See also ==
- New York state elections
- 1948 United States Senate elections
- 1949 New York City mayoral election

== Sources ==
- Official result: THE OFFICIAL COUNT: LEHMAN BY 198,057 in NYT on December 15, 1949 (subscription required)
