= Jeremy Kemp =

English actor (1935–2019)

- Born: Edmund Jeremy James Walker; 3 February 1935; Chesterfield, Derbyshire, England
- Died: 19 July 2019 (aged 84); London, England
- Education: Royal Central School of Speech and Drama
- Years active: 1958–1998
- Partner: Christopher Harter (female)

Edmund Jeremy James Walker (3 February 1935 – 19 July 2019), known professionally as Jeremy Kemp, was an English actor. He was known for his significant roles in the miniseries The Winds of War and War and Remembrance, the film The Blue Max, and the television series Z-Cars.

== Early life ==
Kemp was born 3 February 1935 in Chesterfield, Derbyshire, the son of engineer Edmund Reginald Walker and Elsa May, daughter of Dr. James Kemp, of Sheffield. Edmund Walker was of a Yorkshire landed gentry family that had owned at various times Aldwick Hall at Rotherham, Silton Hall at Northallerton, Ravensthorpe Manor, and Mount St John, at Thirsk. Kemp attended Abbotsholme School in Staffordshire from 1943 to 1953. He studied acting at the Central School of Speech and Drama.

== Career ==
As an actor, Kemp adopted his mother's maiden name as his surname. In 1958, he joined the Radio Drama Company by winning the Carleton Hobbs Bursary. He was an original cast member of Z-Cars, playing PC Bob Steele, but left after just over a year in the role. His other television credits include Colditz, Space: 1999, and a number of other series, such as Hart to Hart, The Greatest American Hero, The Fall Guy, The Adventures of Sherlock Holmes, Conan the Adventurer, Star Trek: The Next Generation, The Winds of War, War and Remembrance and Murder, She Wrote. He played King Leontes in the BBC Television production of The Winter's Tale (1981). He also appeared as Cornwall in the 1983 TV movie version of King Lear, opposite Laurence Olivier as Lear.

From the mid-1960s to the mid-1970s, Kemp had a prominent film career, usually appearing as second male leads or top supporting roles. His films include Dr. Terror's House of Horrors, Operation Crossbow, The Blue Max, Darling Lili, A Bridge Too Far, The Seven-Per-Cent Solution, Top Secret! and Four Weddings and a Funeral.

== Personal life and death ==
Kemp was an avid bird watcher. Private about his personal life, at various times he lived in Britain and California. Kemp's long-term partner was an American woman, Christopher Harter. Her parents, who had expected a boy, named her in honour of a family friend. Kemp was quoted as saying he found the idea of marriage to be "too tying." He died on 19 July 2019, aged 84, Harter having predeceased him.

== Partial filmography ==
- Cleopatra (1963) as Agitator
- Edgar Wallace Mysteries (1964 film) as Vince Howard - "Face of a Stranger" episode
- Dr. Terror's House of Horrors (1965) as Jerry Drake (segment 2 "Creeping Vine")
- Operation Crossbow (1965) as Phil Bradley
- Cast a Giant Shadow (1966) as Senior British Officer
- The Blue Max (1966) as Willi von Klugemann
- Assignment K (1968) as Hal
- The Strange Affair (1968) as Det. Sgt. Pierce
- A Twist of Sand (1968) as Harry Riker
- Eyewitness (1970) as Inspector Galleria
- Darling Lili (1970) as Colonel Kurt Von Ruger
- The Games (1970) as Jim Harcourt
- Pope Joan (1972) as Joan's Father
- The Belstone Fox (1973) as John Kendrick
- The Blockhouse (1973) as Grabinski
- Lips of Lurid Blue (1975) as George Stevens
- The Seven-Per-Cent Solution (1976) as Baron Karl von Leinsdorf
- The Rhinemann Exchange (1977, TV movie) as Geoffrey Moore
- A Bridge Too Far (1977) as R.A.F. Briefing Officer
- East of Elephant Rock (1977) as Harry Rawlins
- Leopard in the Snow (1978) as Bolt
- Caravans (1978) as Dr. Smythe
- The Treasure Seekers (1979) as Reginald Landers
- The Prisoner of Zenda (1979) as Duke Michael
- The Return of the Soldier (1982) as Frank
- The Greatest American Hero (1982, TV series, episode: "Divorce, Venusian Style") as Franz Zedlocker
- The Winds of War (1983, TV miniseries) as Brigadier General Armin Von Roon
- Uncommon Valor (1983) as Ferryman
- George Washington (1984, TV miniseries) as General Gates
- The Adventures of Sherlock Holmes (1984, episode: "The Speckled Band") as Dr. Grimesby Roylott
- Top Secret! (1984) as General Streck
- Peter the Great (1986, TV miniseries) as Col. Patrick Gordon
- Slip-Up (1986, TV movie) as Jack Slipper
- War and Remembrance (1988, TV miniseries) as Brigadier General Armin Von Roon
- When the Whales Came (1989) as Mr. Wellbeloved
- Summer's Lease (1989) as Buck Kettering
- Star Trek: The Next Generation (1990, TV series) as Robert Picard
- Prisoner of Honor (1991, TV movie) as General de Pellieux
- Four Weddings and a Funeral (1994) as Sir John Delaney
- Angels & Insects (1995) as Sir Harald Alabaster
