= William Schooling =

Sir William Schooling KBE FRAS FSS (16 December 1860 – 18 February 1936) was a British expert on insurance and statistics. He was named a CBE in the 1918 Birthday Honours and a KBE in 1920 for his work with the War Savings Committee.

Schooling was the editor of Bourne's Directory, a listing of British insurance companies, and the author of several books on insurance and on the history of the Hudson's Bay Company.

With Mark Barr, he also did pioneering work on the mathematics of the golden ratio.
