= William Rubenstein =

American legal scholar and professor (born 1960)

William B. Rubenstein (born 1960) is an American legal scholar and the Bruce Bromley Professor of Law at Harvard Law School. Professionally, he specializes in complex litigation and civil rights advocacy. He has advocated widely for the rights of gay, lesbian, and HIV-positive individuals. He teaches civil procedure and complex litigation classes.

== Early life and education ==
Rubenstein was born in 1960. He is originally from Pennsylvania, although he claims he never had an intent to stay. He attended Taylor Allderdice High School in Pittsburgh before receiving his B.A. magna cum laude from Yale College in New Haven in 1982. In 1986, he received his J.D. magna cum laude from Harvard Law School. After law school, he clerked for the Hon. Stanley Sporkin in the U.S. District Court for the District of Columbia for one year.

== Civil Rights work ==
In 1986, Rubenstein was awarded a Harvard Fellowship in Public Interest Law to help start an AIDS Project at the national office of the American Civil Liberties Union. Rubenstein served as Staff Attorney with the ACLU's National LGBT and the newly created AIDS Project from 1987-1990 and Director of those Projects from 1990-1995.

During this time, Rubenstein challenged the Reagan administration's response to the AIDS crisis. In 1987, he led the ACLU's lawsuit against the President's Commission on the HIV Epidemic's hearings, in which he defended the position that the commission's makeup was not representative of the group of people actually affected by AIDS. Rubenstein advocated for a larger and more inclusive commission and closer conformity with the terms of the Federal Advisory Committee Act. Rubenstein also litigated civil rights cases in state and federal courts throughout the country and oversaw the ACLU's national litigation docket on these issues. Rubenstein argued the landmark case, Braschi v. Stahl Associates, 544 N.E.2d 49 (N.Y. 1989), before New York's highest court, yielding the first decision in the United States recognizing an unmarried but cohabitating gay couple as a legal family. During the same years, Rubenstein also taught courses on sexual orientation and AIDS law at Harvard and Yale Law Schools. In conjunction with those courses, he authored the first law school casebook in the area, now entitled, Cases and Materials on Sexual Orientation and The Law (now with Carlos Ball and Jane Schacter, 4th ed. 2011).

Rubenstein has continued his work to further the rights of homosexual and HIV-positive people during his academic career. While at UCLA (1997-2007), Rubenstein founded the Williams Institute on Sexual Orientation Law and Public Policy, a think tank "dedicated to conducting rigorous, independent research on sexual orientation and gender identity law and public policy" In 2000, he was chosen as that year's Honoring with Pride honoree by the American Foundation for AIDS Research.

== Complex litigation ==
Besides his work with civil rights, Rubenstein is also an expert on Class action and Complex Litigation. He has written about how institutional lead plaintiffs request proposals from law firms seeking to represent them in securities class actions.

== Teaching career ==
While practicing with the ACLU (1987-1995), Rubenstein also taught courses on sexual orientation and AIDS law at Harvard and Yale Law Schools. In conjunction with those courses, he authored the first law school casebook in the area, now entitled Cases and Materials on Sexual Orientation and The Law (now with Carlos Ball and Jane Schacter, 4th ed. 2011).

From 1995-1997, Rubenstein was a visiting professor from practice at Stanford Law School; he was awarded the 1996-1997 John Bingham Hurlbut Award for Excellence in Teaching at Stanford Law School. From 1997-2007, Rubenstein taught at UCLA School of Law; he was awarded the 2001-2002 Rutter Award for Excellence in Teaching at UCLA.

William Rubenstein joined the Harvard faculty in 2007. In 2012, he was awarded the 2012 Albert M. Sacks-Paul A. Freund Award for Teaching Excellence at Harvard Law School. He is rated by his students as an exceptionally clear and helpful professor.

== Other activities ==
Rubenstein currently serves as director and advisor for several boards. He was chosen to be one of the advisors to the Project on the Principles of the Law of Aggregate Litigation, the American Law Institute's 2009 effort to re-think class action law.

He is co-chair of the Class Action Subcommittee of the ABA's Mass Torts Committee, which addresses current and emerging issues in management aspects of mass tort litigation, including joinder of multiple parties and the use of Alternative Dispute Resolution. He regularly serves as an expert witness in class action lawsuits.

He is a member of the Board of Directors of the ACLU of Southern California, the Board of Advisors of the HIV/AIDS Legal Services Alliance, and the Board of Advisors of the HIV Legal Check-Up Project, a Los Angeles-based program for people recently diagnosed with HIV/AIDS.

== Bar admissions ==
- Supreme Court, Pennsylvania, United States (1986, inactive)
- State Bar of California, California, United States (2004)
- Supreme Judicial Court, Massachusetts, United States (2008)
- District of Columbia Bar, District of Columbia, United States (1988, inactive)

== Selected works ==
Rubenstein's books about issues of sexuality and health include Cases and Materials on Sexual Orientation and the Law (1997); the co-authored work, The Rights of People Who Are HIV Positive (1996) (which received the 1997 American Bar Association Certificate of Merit); Lesbians, Gay Men, and the Law (1993); and AIDS Agenda: Emerging Issues in Civil Rights (1992), co-edited with Nan D. Hunter.

Since 2008, Rubenstein has been the sole author of Newberg on Class Actions and he is in the process of re-writing the entire eleven-volume treatise for its Fifth Edition.
