= Strangler's Web =

1966 British film by John Moxey

- Theatrical release poster
- Directed by: John Moxey
- Screenplay by: George Baxt
- Produced by: Jack Greenwood
- Starring: John Stratton; Pauline Munro; Griffith Jones
- Edited by: Derek Holding
- Production company: Merton Park Studios
- Distributed by: Anglo-Amalgamated
- Release date: 2 September 1966
- Running time: 52 minutes
- Country: United Kingdom
- Language: English

Strangler's Web is a 1966 British second feature film directed by John Moxey and starring John Stratton, Pauline Munro and Griffith Jones. It was written by George Baxt, and is part of the series of Edgar Wallace Mysteries films made at Merton Park Studios.

== Plot ==
Norma Brent is found murdered on Hampstead Heath, with her lover John Vichelski found at the scene holding the strangulation cord. Lewis Preston, his solicitor, discovers that accountant Amos Colfax was planning to marry Norma and share in an inheritance. Actor Jackson Delacorte, badly disfigured in a car accident and now a recluse, confesses to the murder of Norma, who was his bigamous wife, and who had been blackmailing him. But Delacorte is not guilty. The real murderer confesses.

== Cast ==
- John Stratton as Lewis Preston
- Pauline Munro as Melanie
- Griffith Jones as Jackson Delacorte
- Gerald Harper as Inspector Murray
- Maurice Hedley as Amos Colfax
- Michael Balfour as John Vichelski
- Pauline Boty as Nell Pretty
- Patricia Burke as Norma Brent
- Tony Wall as Constable Huntly
- Barry Jackson as Morton Bray
- Marianne Stone as Alicia Preston
- Patti Dalton as Elsie Lovett
- Gary Hope as Michael Olsen
- Rosamund Greenwood as Miss Pitts

== Critical reception ==
The Monthly Film Bulletin wrote: "This ragbag of clichés is directed and acted with enough competence to emerge, by British programme filler standards, as a reasonably entertaining thriller. Griffith Jones looks rather splendid as the faded and disfigured matinee idol."
