= Thomas Barr =

Thomas Barr may refer to:

- Thomas J. Barr (1812–1881), U.S. representative from New York
- Thomas D. Barr (1931–2008), lawyer at Cravath, Swaine & Moore
- Thomas Barr (athlete) (born 1992), Irish athlete
- Tommy Barr (born 1942), Scottish footballer
- Moe Barr (Thomas L. Barr, born 1947), American basketball player
