= Robert Barr (writer, born 1909) =

Scottish journalist, war correspondent, writer

- Born: 22 December 1909; Glasgow, Scotland
- Died: 30 January 1999 (aged 89)
- Occupations: Journalist, war correspondent, writer

Robert Barr (22 December 1909 – 30 January 1999) was a Scottish journalist, BBC war correspondent and writer.

== Biography ==
Barr was born 22 December 1909 in Glasgow. He started training as a chemist when he left school at 15, but not long after he swapped to journalism with a job as a court reporter. He married Janet Connell in 1936 with whom he had one daughter.

== Career ==
After his start at the Glasgow Bulletin as court reporter he moved onto being the editor of the Kilmarnock Herald when just 19. After a brief change in career working for Charles B. Cochran he returned to reporting with the Daily Mirror.

Barr was a writer for the Daily Mail before the outbreak of World War II when he started work as a war correspondent including working closely with Richard Dimbleby. He went to the Ardennes in December 1944 to do a story on troops preparing for Christmas. Expecting a quiet environment he found himself in the middle of the Battle of the Bulge during his thirty days on the story. Barr was one of four people chosen to follow Dwight D. Eisenhower reporting the war from the point of the allied commander from D-Day until the end of the war.

After the war Barr moved into writing for television when the BBC resumed broadcasting in 1946. His work included Germany under Control the first BBC documentary. He moved to Reading, Berkshire with his wife in 1949, to be closer to London that served as a better base for his television and radio writing. He wrote many documentaries as well as for TV shows such as Spycatcher, Z Cars and Softly Softly.

He won the Prix Italia television award for his documentary on medical services at sea provided by the Post Office called Medico.

Barr returned to the Ardennes in 1959 to contrast his war time visit in winter with a summer in the woods, and the piece on the contrast was released on the BBC as "After the Battle".

He wrote the script for the 1980 film Airey Neave: A Will of Steel about British politician and war hero Airey Neave.

Barr published several books including The Scotland Yard Story, The Dark Island and The Edge of the Forest.

After living in the Reading area for thirty years he moved back to his family home on the Isle of Bute off the west coast of Scotland.

== Works ==
- Germany Under Control (1946)
- Report on Germany (1948)
- H.G. Wells The Time Machine (BBC, 1949)
- The Blockade Ends (BBC, 1949)
- Medical Officer of Health (BBC, 1954)
- Flying Ambulance (BBC, 1958)
- Medico (BBC, 1959)
- Spycatcher (BBC, 1959-61)
- Moonstrike (BBC, 1963)
- Spy Trap (BBC, 1972-73; 1975)
- Z Cars (BBC, 1962-78)
- Softly Softly (BBC, 1966-70)
- Softly, Softly: Task Force (BBC, 1970-76)
- Barlow at Large (BBC, 1971; 1973)
- Gazette (ITV, 1968)
- Hadleigh (ITV, 1969-76)
