= The Admirable Crichton (1957 film) =

1957 film by Lewis Gilbert

- Original British cinema poster
- Directed by: Lewis Gilbert
- Written by: Lewis Gilbert (adaptation)
- Screenplay by: Vernon Harris
- Based on: The Admirable Crichton; 1902 play by J.M. Barrie
- Produced by: Ian Dalrymple
- Starring: Kenneth More; Diane Cilento; Cecil Parker; Sally Ann Howes
- Cinematography: Wilkie Cooper
- Edited by: Peter R. Hunt
- Music by: Douglas Gamley
- Color process: Technicolor
- Production company: Modern Screen Play
- Distributed by: Columbia Pictures
- Release date: 11 June 1957 (London)
- Running time: 94 minutes
- Country: United Kingdom
- Language: English
- Budget: £221,884
- Box office: $840,000 (UK)

The Admirable Crichton is a 1957 British satirical comedy romantic adventure film set in the South Seas. It is directed by Lewis Gilbert and starring Kenneth More, Diane Cilento, Sally Ann Howes, and Cecil Parker. The film was based on J.M. Barrie's 1902 stage comedy of the same name. It was released in the United States as Paradise Lagoon.

== Plot ==
In 1905, William Crichton is butler to the Earl of Loam and his family. Crichton knows his place in the highly class-conscious English society. The earl insists that all men are equal, and to prove it, he orders his daughters to treat the staff as guests during an uncomfortable afternoon tea. Lady Brocklehurst arrives and strongly disapproves of the arrangement, as does Crichton.

When Lady Catherine, one of the Earl's daughters, is arrested at a suffragette protest, Crichton recommends the family take a trip on the Earl's steam yacht to the South Seas until the scandal dies down. When the yacht's motors explode during a storm, all are forced to abandon ship. By the time Crichton rescues the still sleeping "tweeny" maid Eliza, the lifeboats have already departed. They jump into the water and are picked up by the wrong boat, reserved for the upper class.

Crichton, Eliza, the Earl, his daughters Mary, Catherine, and Agatha, clergyman John Treherne, and Lady Agatha's suitor Ernest Woolley land on a deserted island. The aristocrats prove to be helpless in their strange new surroundings. It is up to Crichton to start a fire, provide shelter, and find food.

When the abandoned yacht appears and drifts into an offshore rock formation, Crichton swims out to salvage what he can. Upon his return, the others order him to pick up unnecessary luxuries rather than vital supplies on his next trip. He reluctantly complies, but at dinner, he insists he must take charge. The Earl instead discharges him. Eliza throws in her lot with Crichton, and the two depart. The Earl and his party soon realise that they cannot do without Crichton and capitulate, Mary being the sole exception. She is eventually forced to give in as well.

After two years, the social order has been completely upended: Crichton, now affectionately known as "the Guv", is in charge, while his former betters are his servants. In fact, the aristocrats have toughened up admirably and are quite content with their lot. Romantically, the situation is in disarray, as everyone waits to see whether Crichton will choose Mary or "Tweeny" (as Eliza is now called), both of whom are deeply in love with him. All three of the other men are smitten with Tweeny.

Finally, Crichton chooses Mary. However, just as they are exchanging wedding vows, a ship is sighted. Mary begs the others not to light a signal fire, reminding them how happy they have been on the island, but in the end, Crichton does so. When a rescue party lands, he has put on his butler's uniform and resumed his servile duties, much to the discomfort of the others.

The castaways return to London. Woolley writes a book of their experiences, portraying himself as the saviour of the group. Lady Brocklehurst, suspecting that the work is full of lies, insists on questioning all of the party privately. Crichton tells the truth, but in such a way as to conceal everything. After Lady Brocklehurst leaves, Crichton tenders his resignation. When the Earl offers financial assistance for his plan to start a business, Crichton shows him a bag of valuable pearls acquired whilst on the island. Mary begs him to return there with her, but Crichton tells her they cannot fight civilisation. Tweeny offers to go with him, and is ecstatic when he accepts.

== Cast ==
- Kenneth More as Bill Crichton, the Butler /"The Guv"
- Diane Cilento as Eliza, also known as "Tweeny"
- Cecil Parker as Henry, Earl of Loam
- Sally Ann Howes as Lady Mary, Lord Loam's eldest daughter
- Martita Hunt as The Dowager Countess of Brocklehurst
- Jack Watling as Rev. John Treherne (suitor to Lady Catherine)
- Peter Graves as George, Earl of Brocklehurst
- Gerald Harper as The Hon. Ernest Woolley (suitor to Lady Agatha)
- Mercy Haystead as Lady Catherine, a daughter of Lord Loam
- Miranda Connell as Lady Agatha, a daughter of Lord Loam
- Miles Malleson as the local Vicar
- Eddie Byrne as the Captain of Lord Loam's yacht "Bluebell"
- Joan Young as Mrs. Perkins, the housekeeper at Loam Hall
- Brenda Hogan as Fisher, Lady Mary's maid
- Peter Welch as Rolleston, Lord Loam's valet
- Toke Townley as Lovegrove, the head gardener at Loam Hall
- John Le Mesurier (uncredited) as Monsieur Fleury, the chef at Loam Hall
- William Mervyn (uncredited) as a guest at the ball
- Bernard Horsfall as a lifeboatman
- Roland Curram as Thomas, a footman at Loam Hall

== Production ==
Rights to the play were originally owned by Paramount Pictures who made two films based on it. During World War II, Paramount transferred the rights to Alexander Korda. Korda began attempting to adapt the play in 1952, initially with Sidney Gilliat to direct and Rex Harrison to star. However, in January 1956 he optioned the film rights to Mike Todd, who intended to produce the film with Robert Newton and Cantinflas starring. A script was written by Michael Pertwee.

Then Korda, who had the actor Kenneth More under contract, convinced director Lewis Gilbert to make the film together as a follow up to Reach for the Sky. Korda died shortly afterwards, but Gilbert and More decided to proceed with the project. The film was produced by Alexander Korda's old company for distribution by Columbia Pictures.

Lewis Gilbert said the film:

Was freely adapted from the Barrie play to suit Kenny, and it was a very successful film. I don't think you owe total allegiance to the original text because you are, in a sense, making something that is very different. I was very fond of Kenny as an actor, although he wasn't particularly versatile. What he could do, he did very well. His strengths were his ability to portray charm; basically he was the officer returning from the war and he was superb in that kind of role. The minute that kind of role went out of existence, he began to go down as a box office star.

The film was shot from September to December 1956 on Bermuda and at London Film Studios in Shepperton, England. Claremont House is used as the location for Loam Hall.

Although Australian composer Douglas Gamley is credited with most of the film's score, Richard Addinsell - who was uncredited, supplied the original dance music, including a waltz, a polka, and a galop. These pieces were reconstructed, recorded, and released on CD in 2003. The original music was performed by the London Symphony Orchestra and was conducted by Muir Mathieson.

== Reception ==
=== Box office ===
The Admirable Crichton was the third most popular film at the British box office in 1957, after High Society and Doctor at Large. According to Kinematograph Weekly the film was "in the money" at the British box office in 1957 and the film was a "tremendous money spinner".

Variety estimated it earned $840,000 during its first commercial run.

=== Critical ===
Variety called it "a sound starrer for Kenneth More... film is well directed."

Filmink argued Sally Ann Howes "should have become a bigger star" after her work in this film.

== Our Man Crichton ==
The film was turned into a stage musical called Our Man Crichton which debuted in 1964 also starring Kenneth More. More was reluctant to take the part as he could not sing but he agreed because he was being paid £1,000 a week. Box office performance was poor - More attributes this in part to the death of Winston Churchill - but it still ran six months.

== References in other media ==
The character Kryten, a waiter-like robot, and one of the main characters in the science fiction comedy Red Dwarf, is a reference to Crichton.

== See also ==
- List of British films of 1957
- List of films that depict class struggle
