= Face of a Stranger =

1964 British film by John Moxey

- Theatrical release poster
- Directed by: John Moxey
- Screenplay by: John Sansom
- Based on: a story by Edgar Wallace
- Produced by: Jack Greenwood
- Starring: Jeremy Kemp; Bernard Archard; Rosemary Leach
- Cinematography: James Wilson
- Edited by: Derek Holding
- Production company: Merton Park Studios
- Distributed by: Anglo-Amalgamated
- Release date: 1964
- Running time: 53 minutes
- Country: United Kingdom
- Language: English

Face of a Stranger is a 1964 British film directed by John Moxey and starring Jeremy Kemp, Bernard Archard and Rosemary Leach. The screenplay was by John Sansom based on a story by Wallace. It is part of the series of Edgar Wallace Mysteries films made at Merton Park Studios.

== Plot ==
Vince Howard and John Bell are prison cellmates awaiting their release. When Bell is found with a knife his release is delayed by three months. He asks Howard to visit his wife Mary, who is blind. Once out of jail, Howard discovers that his own wife has left him. He starts to live with Mary. Knowing that Bell has money stashed away from a robbery, on his release Howard offers to drive him to get the stolen cash. Howard kills him and he returns with the money to Mary, who drugs him and makes to run off with her friend Michael Forrest. Howard recovers from the dope and kills Forest and then Mary.

== Cast ==
- Jeremy Kemp as Vince Howard
- Bernard Archard as Michael Forrest
- Rosemary Leach as Mary Bell
- Philip Locke as John Bell
- Elizabeth Begley as Mrs Holden
- Jean Marsh as Grace
- Ronald Leigh-Hunt as prison governor
- Mike Pratt as Harry
- Harry Longhurst as Peters
- Alec Bregonzi as garage proprietor
- Keith Smith as ticket collector
- Edward Dentith as prison officer
- Victor Charrington as chief prison officer

== Critical reception ==
Kine Weekly wrote: "This is a somewhat far-fetched story of double dealing and one which, in the first few reels at least, strikes some as preposterous. However, it has the Wallace surprises to bring it back on a saner level and the result is holding, and sometimes violent melodrama. ... Like all the pictures in this series it pours a pint into a half pint measure and this restriction of footage, while keeping the interest vibrantly alive, is an example of what may be achieved as opposed to the so often overlong film. Jeremy Kemp is good as a man whose morals obviously deteriorate at the thought of money while Bernard Archard is a disarming schemer, Rosemary Leach too, is quite convincing as the blind wife with deep laid plans for a future on her unfortunate husband's ill-gotten gains. Philip Locke, though a crook, is the one character to win a modicum of audience sympathy."
