= Peter Welch (actor) =

English actor (1922–1984)

- Welch as Morgan in The Android Invasion (1975)
- Born: Peter William Welch; 30 March 1922; St Pancras, London, England
- Died: 20 November 1984 (aged 62); Hammersmith, London, England
- Occupation: Actor
- Years active: 1955-1983

Peter William Welch (30 March 1922 – 20 November 1984) was a British actor who appeared in television programmes including Dixon of Dock Green, Z-Cars, Spy Trap, Softly, Softly, Doctor Who and Danger Man with Patrick McGoohan. He spent several years touring in the theatre with a repertory company he founded, and began playing character parts in films from the mid 1950s.

== Filmography ==
- Dial 999 (1955)
- The Long Arm (1956)
- Five Clues to Fortune (1957)
- The Admirable Crichton (1957)
- The Silent Enemy (1958)
- The House of the Seven Hawks (1959)
- The Secret Partner (1961)
- A Prize of Arms (1962)
- Calculated Risk (1963)
- The Secret of Blood Island (1964)
- Jude the Obscure (1971) - Policeman

== TV ==
- The Adventures of Robin Hood (1957–58) - Wounded Man/Sheriff's Servant/Ambassador/Lt. Howard (4 episodes)
- No Hiding Place (1959–67) - Joe Denham/McBride/Linker/Wilkie/Benny Gimbal (5 episodes)
- Maigret (1960 TV series) (1961) - Big Louis (1 episode, "The Golden Fleece")
- Hancock (1963 TV series) ('The Man on the Corner' episode) (1963) - P.C.Glover
- Dixon of Dock Green (1963–68) - Albert Fenwick/Jock/Sgt. Kelly/Harry Comer/Arnold Russell (5 episodes)
- Emergency-Ward 10 (1963) - Gunner Clarke (6 episodes)
- Spy Trap (1972–75) - Det. Supt. Clark (26 episodes)
- Doctor Who (1975) - Morgan (The Android Invasion)
- Emmerdale (1977) - Mr. Gunnarson (4 episodes)
