= James R. Barr =

Scottish engineer

James Robertson Barr A.M.I.E.E. (22 October 1884 – 5 December 1910) was a Scottish engineer and lecturer in Electrical Engineering at Heriot-Watt College, Edinburgh.

He was an apprentice to Bruce Peebles & Co. Ltd. and spent a year at the Leith Power Station. He then was designer to the Electric Construction Company and took some plant to West Africa for erection.

In October 1905 he was appointed assistant lecturer in Electrical Engineering at Heriot Watt College. He was elected associated member of the Institution of Electrical Engineers in 1906.

Despite his death by tuberculosis at the age of 26, his 1908 textbook Principles of Direct-Current Electrical Engineering was revised and reprinted until the 1950s. The companion volume The Design of Alternating Current Machinery was written but not yet revised for publication at the time of his death. Robert Archibald from Dundee Technical College revised and corrected the proofs for its publication in 1913.

He was awarded three medals for student achievement:

- Physics & Mathematics, 1900–1901 Session, Leith Technical College.
- Advanced Electricity & Magnetism, 1901–1902 Session, Heriot-Watt College.
- Mathematics Stage III, 1902–1903 Session, Heriot-Watt College.
