= James Barr (moderator) =

James Barr (1789–1861) was a minister of the Church of Scotland, who served as Moderator of the General Assembly in 1853.

== Life ==
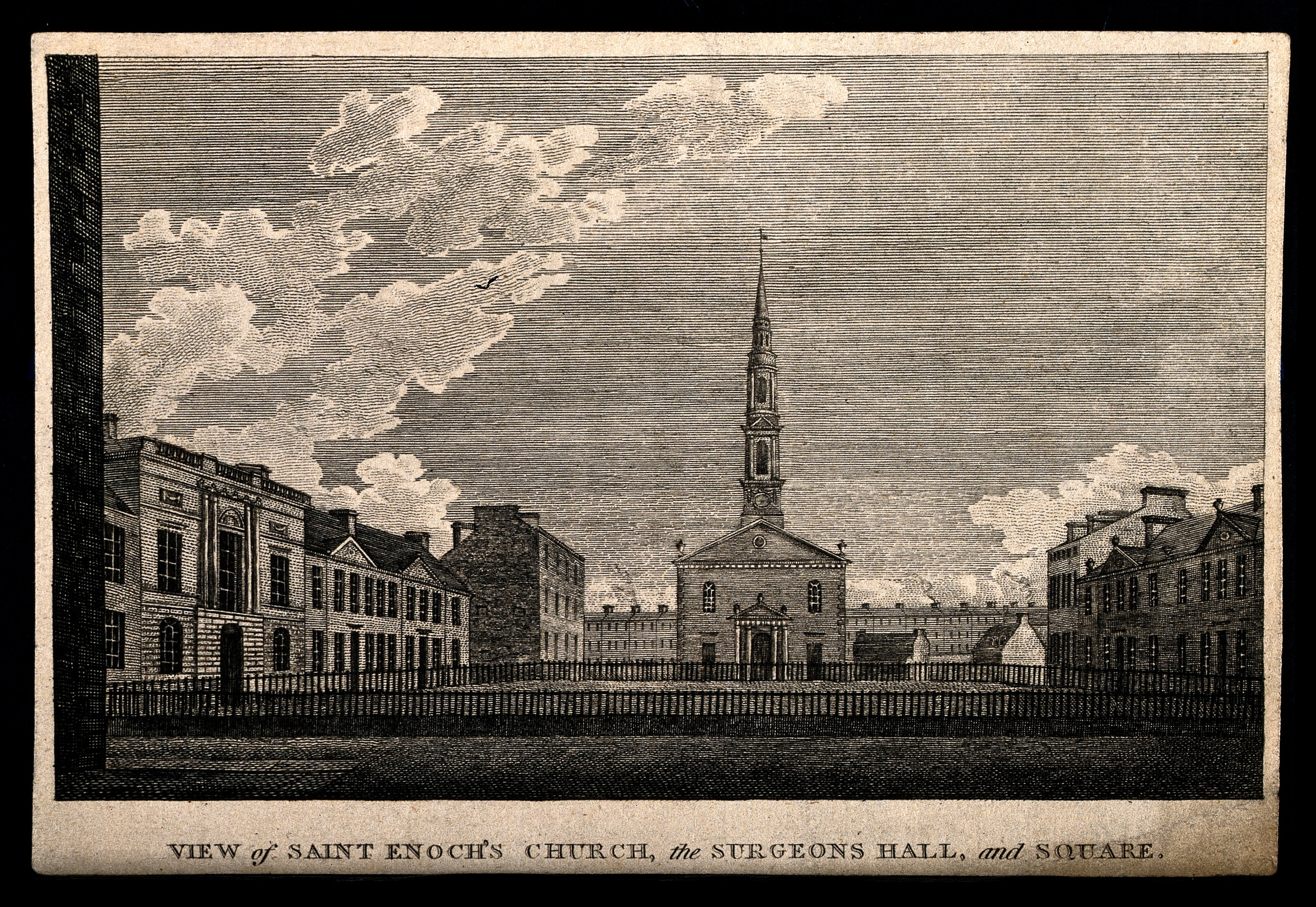
St. Enoch's Church (centre)

He was born in 1789 the fourth son of John Barr a farmer near Dunlop. He studied at Glasgow University and was licensed to preach by the Presbytery of Glasgow in December 1813.

In July 1815 he was ordained by the Presbyterian ministry of Liverpool as minister of Oldham Street Church in Liverpool. Glasgow University awarded him an honorary Doctor of Divinity in 1821. In February 1823 he became minister of Port Glasgow Parish Church. In October 1843 the Glasgow Town Council presented him to the congregation of St Enoch's Church and he translated to this new position in November 1843 in place of James Henderson who had joined the Free Church in the Disruption of 1843.

In 1853 he succeeded Lewis William Forbes as Moderator of the General Assembly of the Church of Scotland the highest position in the Scottish Church. He was succeeded in turn by James Grant.

He died on 16 December 1861. He was buried in the graveyard of St Enoch's. Both church and graveyard were destroyed in 1926 to make way for a bus station.

== Family ==
In June 1823 he married Sarah Jane Steele daughter of Matthew Steele of Liverpool. Their children included:

- Isabella (1824–1849)
- John (1825–1844)
- Marion (or Maria) Stevenson Barr (b. 1828) married John Wilson of Dundyvan
- Elizabeth Dunlop Barr (b. 1832)
- Edward Steele Barr (b. 1834)
- Jemima Jane

== Publications ==
- Account of the Parish of Newark
- Contending for the Faith (1845)
