= William Barr (disambiguation) =

William Barr (born 1950) is an American lawyer and government official.

William Barr may also refer to:

- William G. Barr (1920–1987), Illinois state representative and businessman
- William Barr (historian) (born 1940), Scottish historian at the University of Calgary, Canada
- William Barr (artist) (1867–1933), Scottish / Californian artist
- Billy Barr (footballer) (born 1969), English footballer and coach
- Billy Barr (naturalist), American amateur scientist, known for collecting climate change data
