= Floyd Covington =

American civil rights activist

Floyd C. Covington
- Born: March 29, 1901; Colorado Springs
- Died: April 16, 1989 (aged 88)
- Other names: Floyd Covington; Floyd C. Covington
- Education: Washburn College (BA); University of Pittsburgh (MA)
- Years active: ca. 1920–1970
- Movement: Civil Rights Movement
- Spouse: Willa Alma Covington (Married 1929-1989)
- Children: Floyd C. Covington, Jr.
- Parents: Lulu Jeltz Covington; Charles B. Covington

Floyd Cornelius Covington (March 29, 1901 - April 16, 1989) was an African American civil rights leader based in Los Angeles from the 1920s to 1970s.

== Early life and education ==
Floyd C. Covington was born to Lulu Jeltz Covington and Charles B. Covington. By the time Floyd was a toddler, Charles left Lulu to rear Floyd and his brother alone. He moved to Los Angeles after the death of his mother at 13, living with his second cousin, Lillian Jeltz Craw. Craw was a mother-figure to Covington, and empowered him to get his high school education in his 20s and further pursue a college education. In 1923, Floyd graduated from Washburn College in with a B.A. in sociology. He later graduated from the University of Pittsburgh in 1928 with a M.A. in sociology and economics.

== Career ==
Covington was affiliated with both the National Urban League and the local Los Angeles chapter, serving as Executive Secretary (1928–1953) and the Director (1931–1950) of Los Angeles Urban League. Serving as the Director during the Great Depression, he used a tactic that he titled "the Negro Market," where he used business statistics to persuade White business owners to end their discriminatory hiring practices. He was an advocate for labor rights and integration, helping to expand business initiatives in Los Angeles, assisting Black communities with employment integration.

He had affiliations with the NAACP, accompanying chief lobbyist Clarence Mitchell Jr. during interviews with leaders of the A-35 Boilermakers union across the United States. He presented an address on "the Boulder Dam" situation, which was of interest to the NAACP and National Bar Association. From 1950 to 1957, he served as the Racial Relations Advisor for the Federal Housing Administration, later becoming an Equal Opportunity Specialist for the Department of Housing and Urban Development.

== Personal life ==
Covington married Willa Alma Covington (née Greene) in 1929. They had one child, Floyd C. Covington Jr., who later also worked for the Los Angeles Urban League.

== Legacy and honors ==
In 1984, then Mayor Tom Bradley dedicated April 24 to Floyd and his wife as ""Floyd and Alma Covington Day.”

The University of Southern California offered the "Floyd Covington Fellowship" through the USC Libraries in 2022, 2023 for students to work with social-justice related library collections, named in honor of Covington and his work to advance civil rights.
