= Mike Barr =

Mike Barr may refer to:

- Mike Barr (basketball) (born 1950), retired American basketball player
- Mike Barr (American football) (born 1978), American football punter
- Mike Barr (tennis) (born 1956), tour tennis player in the late 1970s, early 1980s
- Mike W. Barr (born 1952), American comics writer

== See also ==
- Michael Barr (disambiguation)
