= Barr (placename element) =

Barr- is a pre-Indo-European linguistic root meaning 'wooded hill', 'natural barrier'.

In addition to the common noun bar, it explains many place names as:

- Barr, commune of Alsace, France
- Bar, commune of Corrèze, Limousin France
- Bar-sur-Aube and Bar-sur-Seine, communes of Aube, Champagne, France
- Bar-le-Duc, commune of Lorraine, France

but not Le Bar-sur-Loup, a former Albarn > Aubarn.

In the Alps, the word applies to rocky escarpments:

- la Barre des Écrins is a mountain in the French Alps.

This root should not be mistaken for the Basque root Bar- / ibar 'valley'.
