= Charles W. Froessel =

American lawyer and politician (1892–1982)

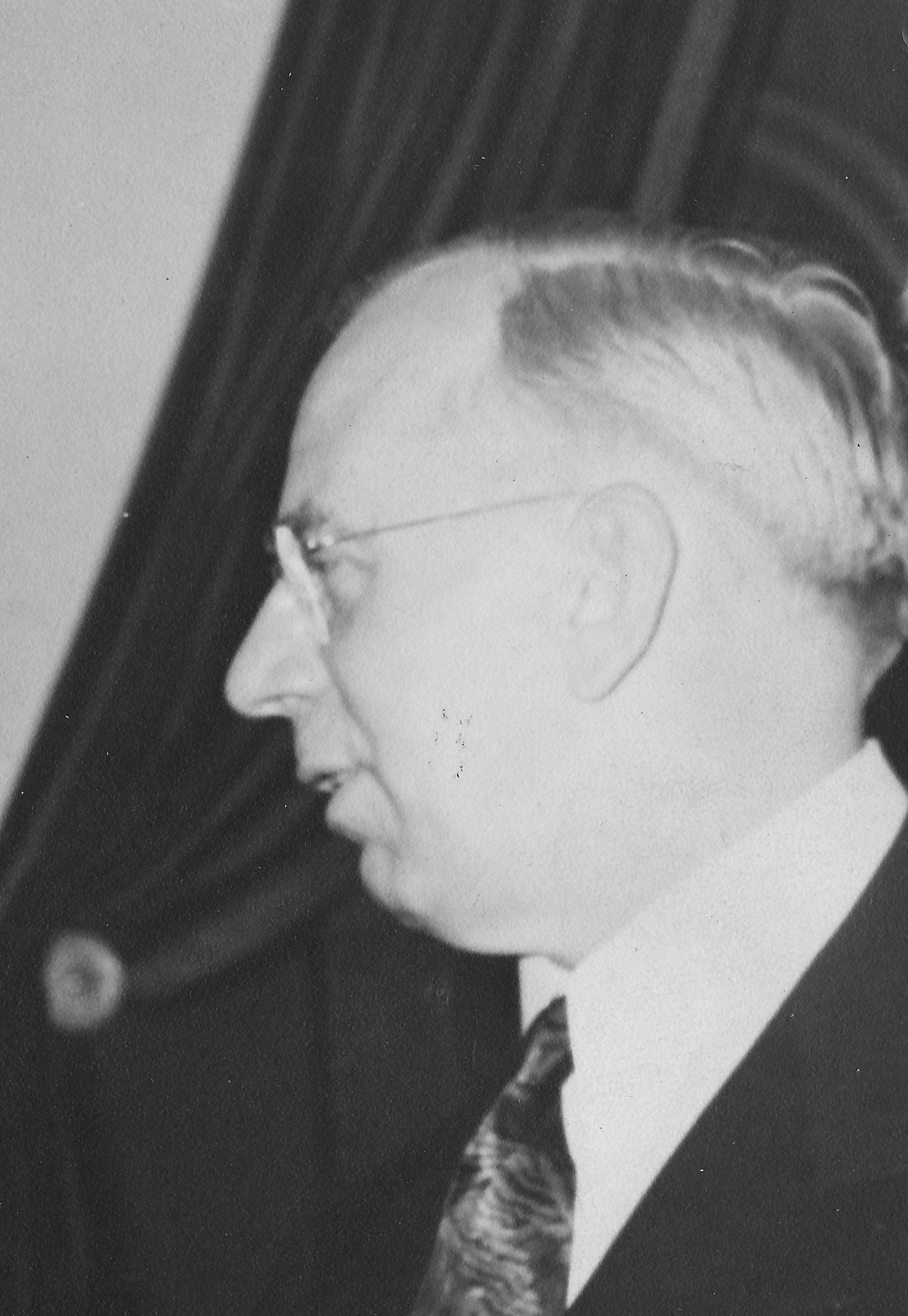
Charles William Froessel

Charles William Froessel (November 8, 1892, in Brooklyn, Kings County, New York – May 2, 1982, in Manhattan, New York City) was an American lawyer and politician.

== Early life ==
He was the son of Theodore Froessel and Barbara Froessel. He graduated with an LL.B. in 1913, and an LL.M. in 1914, from New York Law School. During World War I he served in the U.S. Navy with the rank of lieutenant.

== Career ==
He was Counsel to the Sheriff of Queens County from 1916 to 1920. He was Assistant District Attorney of Queens County from 1924 to 1930. On June 1, 1927, he married Elsie Stier (d. 1952). He was Special Assistant to the U.S. Attorney General in charge of slum clearance projects in New York City from 1935 to 1937.

In January 1937, he was appointed a justice of the City Court in Queens County. In November 1937, he was elected to the New York Supreme Court (2nd District).

An active Freemason, Froessel served as Grand Master of Masons in the State of New York for two terms, 1944 and 1945.

In 1949, he ran on the Democratic and Liberal tickets to the New York Court of Appeals and was elected. In 1951 he wrote a concurring opinion on school prayer, arguing that non-sectarian school prayer was constitutional, whereas daily school prayer was unconstitutional.

He retired from the bench at the end of 1962 when he reached the constitutional age limit of 70 years.

== Retirement and later life ==
In retirement, Froessel served on the board of trustees and as a dean at New York Law School.

He died on May 2, 1982, at St. Vincent's Hospital in Manhattan.

== Sources ==
- The History of the New York Court of Appeals, 1932-2003 by Bernard S. Meyer, Burton C. Agata & Seth H. Agata (page 23)
- Court of Appeals judges
- MRS. CHARLES FROESSEL His wife's obit in NYT on March 17, 1952 (subscription required)
