= George Barr =

George Barr may refer to:

- George Barr (artist) (1937–2025), American science fiction artist
- George Barr (soccer) (1915–2000), American soccer player
- George Barr (umpire) (1897–1974), American professional baseball umpire

== See also ==
- George Barr McCutcheon (1866–1928), American novelist and playwright
