= Michael Barr =

Michael Barr may refer to:

- Michael Barr (mathematician) (born 1937), Canadian mathematician
- Michael Barr (software engineer), American software engineer
- Michael Preston Barr (1927–2009), American pop music composer
- Michael Barr (U.S. official) (born 1965/6), American legal academic
- Michael Barr (died 2016), Irish murder victim
- Michael Barr, vocalist of the American metalcore band Volumes

== See also ==
- Mike Barr (disambiguation)
- Mick Barr, American guitarist
