= John Stratton (actor) =

British actor (1925–1991)

- Born: John Wilson Stratton; 7 November 1925; Clitheroe, Lancashire, England
- Died: 25 October 1991 (aged 65); Hampstead, London, England
- Occupation: Actor
- Years active: 1949–1991

John Wilson Stratton (7 November 1925 – 25 October 1991) was a British actor, born in Clitheroe, Lancashire, where he kept his permanent home.

He is perhaps best known for his early film roles during the fifties, where he played the young apprentice parts of Ferraby and Ward opposite Jack Hawkins in both The Cruel Sea (1953) and The Long Arm (1956) respectively. He played a similar role on television in the third Quatermass serial Quatermass and the Pit, essaying the role of Captain Potter opposite André Morell's Professor Bernard Quatermass.

Older and less boyish by the sixties, he emerged as character actor of some range, playing numerous roles in many television programmes of the decade including the part of alcoholic journalist Fred Blane in It's Dark Outside. Other TV appearances include Dixon of Dock Green, The Avengers, Armchair Theatre, The Man in Room 17, Public Eye, Mr. Rose, Z-Cars, Sherlock Holmes (playing Inspector Athelney Jones), Coronation Street, UFO ("E.S.P." episode), The Rivals of Sherlock Holmes, Hadleigh, The Forgotten Story, Softly, Softly, The Pallisers, Alan Plater's 1980 Yorkshire Television adaptation of J.B. Priestley's The Good Companions (in the central role of Jess Oakroyd), Fall of Eagles, Backs to the Land, The Professionals, Doctor Who (in the serial The Two Doctors), Juliet Bravo, The Trinity Tales and Lovejoy.

== Selected filmography ==
- The Small Back Room (1949) - Young Army Officer at Committee Meeting (uncredited)
- The Cure for Love (1949) - Sam
- Seven Days to Noon (1950) - Army Mechanic (uncredited)
- Appointment with Venus (1951) - 1st.R.A.F. Officer
- The Happy Family (1952) - David
- The Cruel Sea (1953) - Lieutenant Ferraby
- The Long Arm (1956) - Detective Sergeant Ward
- The Man in the Sky (1957) - Peter Hook
- Seven Waves Away (1957) - Jimmy 'Sparks' Clary
- The Challenge (1960) - Rick
- Strangler's Web (1966)
- Frankenstein and the Monster from Hell (1974) - Asylum Director
