= Richard at the Lee =

Robin Hood ally

Richard at the Lee (also referred to as Rychard at the Lea and Sir Richard of Verysdale) is a major character in the early medieval ballads of Robin Hood, especially the lengthy ballad A Gest of Robyn Hode, and has reappeared in Robin Hood tales throughout the centuries.

Sir Richard is said to have been a landowner, the lord of Verysdale. In many versions, Sir Richard appears as a sorrowful knight whose lands will be forfeited because he pledged them to an abbot to get a loan he can not repay; Robin assists him with the money. This is his first appearance in the Gest, although he is not named at that point. Later in the Gest, he reappears, now named, and gives Robin Hood and the Merry Men sanctuary from the Sheriff of Nottingham by hiding them in his castle, after they have nearly been caught in an archery tournament; this part of the tale features in fewer later versions.

== In A Gest of Robyn Hode ==
Richard is first introduced by name in fytte five of A Gest of Robyn Hode, and is presently revealed to be the unnamed knight mentioned in fytte one, who is connected with Wryesdale in fytte two. Richard came from a long line of knights and was a courteous man indeed. He had inherited a great castle at the wooded village of Lee in Verysdale in which he resided; a castle with thick fortified walls, surrounded by two ditches and with a drawbridge at the entrance.

Then was there a fayre castell
A lytell within the wode
Double-dyched it was about
And walled, by the rode.

And in there dwelled that gentyll knyght
Sir Richard at the Lee
That Robyn had lent his good
Under the grenë-wode tree.

— A Gest of Robyn Hode, Fytte V, 309-310 appended to

JC Holt considered the Manor of Wryesdale (comprising the villages of Over Wyresdale and Nether Wyresdale) as the likeliest candidate for Verysdale; if that is so, the likeliest candidate for "the Lee" in Holt's opinion is the hamlet of Lee in Wrysedale, at the spot where the road from Lancaster through the Trough of Bowland crosses the River Wyre. A family named Legh or de la Legh from Lancashire were involved in the management of Bowland Forest, although none are recorded as being named Richard. A Gilbert de la Legh was stock manager of the park of Ightenhill, and was kidnapped and held for a ransom of £20 at Holbeck, near Leeds; the stud farm was raided and stock worth £200 was driven away under the leadership of Nicholas Mauleverer, Constable of Skipton Castle.

Other significant disorders occurred in Sherwood Forest to the south, and could have been "woven in" to the developing Robin Hood tales by mixing in Lancashire-Yorkshire folk memories of disruptions of the king's peace, according to Holt. Holt considers that the career of Roger Godberd could have supplied many of the detail's of Robin's exploits in Sherwood, while the actions of Goodberd's protector Richard Foliot, a knight and former sheriff of Nottingham could have supplied some of the material, and the Christian name for Sir Richard at the Lee. When Foliot was accused of sheltering Goodberd and other accused felons, he had to surrender both his castle and his son to the sheriff of Yorkshire, who also seized Foliot's lands. Foliot's holdings comprised Fenwick, South Yorkshire, Walden Stubbs and Norton, Doncaster, which is six miles from Wentbridge. Holt points out that Guy of Gisborne, a character in another early Robin Hood ballad (Robin Hood and Guy of Gisborne, Child Ballad 118) takes his name from a village, (Gisburn), ten miles from Wryesdale east of the Bowland forest, in his opinion further bolstering the case for Lancashire and Yorkshire, especially the West Riding of Yorkshire supplying many of the personages and places mentioned in the A Gest of Robyn Hode.

In the first fytte, Robin and his men encounter an impoverished knight later to be revealed as Sir Richard. The knight claims that he has been in impoverished state for nearly two years. The knight relates that he lives in this castle with a small group of loyal servants, his lady fair, and a son whom he loves dearly. This son, aged twenty at the time, killed a knight and squire of Lancaster in a fair joust. In order to save his son, the knight was forced to mortgage all his goods and landholdings to raise the sum of four hundred pounds from the abbot of Saint Mary's Abbey.

'He slewe a knyght of Lancaster,
That shulde haue ben myn ayre,
Whanne he was twenty wynter olde,
In felde wolde iust full fayre.'

'My londes both sette to wedde, Robyn,
Vntyll a certayn day,
To a ryche abbot here besyde,
Of Seynt Mari Abbey.'

— A Gest of Robyn Hode, Fytte I, 52-3 in

Robin asks the knight what will happen to him if he cannot recover his land; the knight replies that he will become a sailor, and visit the Holy Land as a pilgrim. When asked why his friends do not help him, the knight replies that they have abandoned him. Robin and his men are moved by the knight's tale, and they offer him wine, the needed sum, tack and full livery befitting his station.

Meanwhile, in Barnsdale Forest, Robin Hood commanded some of his merry men to prepare a feast fit for a king, and to the others he commanded them to bring him a wealthy knight or nobleman to join him in his meal. The merry men were commanded by Robin to "walk up to the Saylis" and lie in wait there. (In 1852, this was identified by Joseph Hunter as a plantation that is today on the eastern side of the A1 fly-over, adjoining the village of Wentbridge. Now known as Sayles, it was once a small tenancy in the parish of Kirk Smeaton. Evidence on the ground shows that the author of the ballad knew this place well and realised that it was the perfect look-out point.) After finding nobody there, Little John, Will Scarlet and Much the miller's son lay in wait for the knight next to "Watlinge Strete". (This is actually a misnomer: the road in question was not the Romans' Watling Street (which ran from Kent to north Wales), but their Ermine Street, which stretched from Kent to York. It later became the Great North Road, and today is the A1.

There passed a poor-looking knight with a sad expression, and they brought him to Robin Hood's camp. He was treated with utmost respect and enjoyed a fine banquet of deer, fowls, swans, pheasants, bread, and fine wine. After the meal Robin Hood asked the knight to pay for his meal. However, the knight told Robin that he was poor and had no more than ten shillings in his trunk.

Robin Hood tested the knight's honesty. If there were no more than ten shillings in the trunk, as the knight said, then Robin would not touch a penny and indeed would assist the knight financially. However, if the knight had lied then Robin would take everything the knight had. The merry men opened up the trunk and indeed found it nearly empty with only ten shillings (half a pound) inside.

So, after finding the knight true, Robin listened to his entire story. This knight was Sir Richard of Verysdale; Robin felt sorry for him and, Richard having also seen nobility and honesty in Robin, the two men formed a close bond of friendship. As Sir Richard was travelling to York to see the abbot of Saint Mary's that very day, Robin lent Richard the four hundred pounds needed to pay back the abbot and told Richard that there was no obligation to pay it back in a hurry. And so Richard repaid his loan to the abbot, and kept his lands, courtesy of Robin Hood.

A variation of the tale is that Robin took the money back from the Sheriff of Nottingham and gave it to Richard at the Lee.

== Later adaptations ==
In other tales, he also travelled to the forests of Barnsdale and Sherwood occasionally, where the outlaws lived, and dined with them. Because of this he is sometimes considered a Merry Man himself.

In some tales, such as Alfred Lord Tennyson's play The Foresters, or Robin Hood and Maid Marian, he is said to be the father of Maid Marian. He appears as such (as Sir Richard of Leaford) in the television series Robin of Sherwood, played by George Baker.

Howard Pyle included the payment of mortgage in The Merry Adventures of Robin Hood. He also used Richard as a character in other portions, such as his retelling of Robin's escape from the king, after an archery tournament before him, and when Richard the Lion-Hearted visited the forest, the disguise was revealed when Richard arrived to warn the outlaws.

Sir Richard (Sir Richard of the Lee), played by Ian Hunter was a recurring character in the 1950s television series The Adventures of Robin Hood, appearing in seven episodes of the series.

The lovelorn knight, John of York, who appears in an episode of the second season of the 2006 BBC series Robin Hood is clearly based on Richard at the Lee. John was passing through Sherwood Forest on his way to pay an instalment of a debt to the Canon of Birkley when he was ambushed by Robin Hood and his men. Parallels to the story of Richard are that John claimed only to have 10 shillings, Robin tested his honesty and said he would assist him if he were telling the truth, and then gave him money to enable him to repay his debt.

Steven A. McKay's 2014 novella Knight of the Cross - a spin-off from the author's Forest Lord series - features Sir Richard-at-Lee battling ancient evil in medieval Rhodes.

== See also ==
- Robin Hood
- Verysdale
