= Joseph Barr =

Joseph or Joe Barr may refer to:

- Joseph M. Barr (1906–1982), Mayor of Pittsburgh
- Joseph W. Barr (1918–1996), U.S. Secretary of the Treasury
- Joe Barr (1944–2008), American editor and writer for the SourceForge sites, Linux.com, and the IT Managers Journal
- Joe Barr (footballer) (1868–1894), Scottish soccer player
- Joe Barr (born 1959), Northern Irish cyclist
