= Douglas Barr (cricketer) =

Scottish cricketer

Personal information
- Born: 1 February 1935 (age 91); Dalry, Edinburgh, Scotland
- Batting: Right-handed
- Bowling: Right-arm fast-medium

Career statistics
Competition	First-class
Matches	41
Runs scored	1,199
Batting average	19.65
100s/50s	0/6
Top score	86
Balls bowled	6,399
Wickets	88
Bowling average	31.21
5 wickets in innings	2
10 wickets in match	0
Best bowling	6/89
Catches/stumpings	34/0
- Source: CricketArchive

Douglas Barr (born 1 February 1935) is a former Scottish first class cricketer and a member of Cricket Scotland's Hall of Fame.

A fast bowler, Barr once took 10 for 24 when playing with Melville College. His 88 first class wickets for Scotland is second only to Jimmy Allan.
