= Jerry Booth =

English footballer

Personal information
- Place of birth: England
- Position: Defender

Senior career*
| Years | Team | Apps | (Gls) |
| 1903 | Burnley | 1 | (0) |
- * Club domestic league appearances and goals

Jerry Booth was an English footballer who played as a winger. He played one match in the Football League for Burnley in 1903.
