= Thomas D. Barr =

American lawyer (1911–2010)

- Historical photo of Thomas Barr
- Born: Thomas Delbert Barr; January 23, 1931; Kansas City, Missouri
- Died: January 24, 2008 (aged 77); Santa Barbara, California
- Education: Yale Law School; University of Missouri–Kansas City
- Occupation: Lawyer
- Employer: Cravath, Swaine & Moore
- Spouse: Cornelia Barr
- Children: Four

Thomas Delbert Barr (January 23, 1931 – January 24, 2008) was a prominent lawyer at the law firm of Cravath, Swaine & Moore.

== Early life ==
He was born in Kansas City, Missouri. He graduated from the University of Missouri–Kansas City in 1953 and Yale Law School, and served as an officer in the Marine Corps.

== Legal work ==
He joined Cravath, Swaine & Moore in 1958 and stayed with the firm for more than 40 years.

Barr is best known for representing the International Business Machines Corporation in a 13-year antitrust battle with the federal government, as well as satellite cases by competitors and the EEC. The government began the case in 1969 and dropped it in 1982. For his outstanding efforts and the scale of the case, Barr is credited as the father of big-case litigation. The case is described in details in The Partners by James B. Stewart and in IBM:The Rise and Fall and Reinvention of a Global Icon by James W Cortada.

Other major cases included Powell v. McCormack, over the attempt to exclude Adam Clayton Powell Jr. from taking his seat in the US House of Representatives; the defense of Time Magazine in the libel case brought by Ariel Sharon, relating to the Sabra and Shatila massacre; the effort to recover on behalf of holders of defaulted municipal bonds issued by Washington Public Power Supply System (WPPSS); and the prosecution on behalf of the Federal Deposit Insurance Corporation (FDIC) against Drexel Burnham Lambert and Michael Milken over fraudulent junk bonds. His major pro bono work included cases for the Lawyers' Committee for Civil Rights Under Law.

Barr was included in the article, "The Best Lawyers in New York" by Robin Pogrebin published by New York Magazine - March 20, 1993.

Barr was named one of America's top fourteen trial lawyers in, America's Top Trial Lawyers, by Donald E. Vinson.

== Other activities ==
In June 1968, President Lyndon Johnson formed The National Commission on the Causes and Prevention of Violence to study the rise in political, racial, and other criminal violence in America. Barr served on several of the Commission’s task forces including; The Task Force on Assassination and Political Violence, the Task Force on Firearms, and the Task Force on Law and Law Enforcement, among others. In the reports of these task forces, Barr is listed under Commission Staff Officers as the Deputy Director. Lloyd N. Cutler, Barr's colleague and friend, is listed as the Executive Director. Library of Congress Catalog Card Number: 74-603981

In August 1992, Barr along with his partners at Cravath, Swaine & Moore, David Boise and Evan R. Chesler participated in a mock trial of Lee Harvey Oswald at the annual meeting of The American Bar Association. Barr and his colleagues took the role of Oswald's defense. The mock trial took place over two days. A five member jury found Oswald not guilty with a vote of 3-2. A transcript of the mock trial was published as The Trial of the Century: America vs. Lee Harvey Oswald.

Barr was a member of the Board of Directors and a faculty member at the Salzburg Seminar in American Studies, now called the Salzburg Global Seminar. The Seminar, based at Schloss Leopldskron in Salzburg, Austria "was established in 1947 as a means of bringing together young intellectuals from nations recently at war to discuss topics of mutual interest." According to the List of Participants of the 1998 meeting of the Board of Directors, Barr was a Board Member from 1993-1996 and 1998-2001 and participated as faculty in four seminars. In 1993, Barr was faculty in a seminar called American Law and Legal Institutions, in which United States Supreme Court Justice Stephen Breyer, Lord Slynn of Hadley, and Lloyd N. Cutler also participated.

== Memorial ==
Barr was a friend and colleague of former United States Attorney General Nicholas Katzenbach. In 1969, Katzenbach became General Consul at IBM and together with Barr led IBM's defense in US vs. IBM. Katzenbach spoke at Barr's memorial saying,

"I worked closely with Tom Barr for more than fifteen years and I have never worked with a finer lawyer—or a finer person—before or since. Tom was a leader with a passion to excel and a willingness to do the work, which is the foundation of all excellence. He imbued that passion in all who worked with him, inspiring a team-sometimes a small army-to work on uncovering and understanding every factual detail, because that way led to success. For Tom, there was no such thing as being over prepared." April 4, 2008

== See also ==
- Bruce Bromley, his colleague and mentor at Cravath, Swaine & Moore
