= Robert Barr (field hockey) =

Scottish field hockey player

Personal information
- Born: 25 July 1978 (age 48)

Sport
- Sport: Field hockey
Senior career
| Years | Team | Caps | Goals |
| 2007–2017 | Grange | - | - |
National team
| Years | Team | Caps | Goals |
| – | Scotland | | - |

Robert Barr (born 25 July 1978) is a field hockey player who played for the Scotland men's national field hockey team.

== Biography ==
Barr was educated at the University of Edinburgh and played for Edinburgh University Hockey Club.

He plays his club hockey for Grange Hockey Club in Edinburgh in the Scottish Hockey National Leagues. Barr has also represented Scottish Universities and Edinburgh University Hockey Club. Barr has been captain of Grange for several seasons. Barr has represented Scotland in South Africa, Italy, Pakistan, Russia and Switzerland. During the 2009 season he was selected to represent the Highland Jaguars in the Great Britain Super League.

With his club side, Grange, he played in the 2007–08 and 2012–13 Euro Hockey Leagues. Grange were runners-up to Dinamo Elektrostal in the final of the 2009–10 EuroHockey Club Trophy.

Barr was a member of the Grange squad that won the 2015 Scottish Cup, the first time Grange had won the Cup in successive years. Grange defeated Edinburgh University 5–1 in the final.

In 2008, Barr and fellow Scotland International, Colin Clarke, set up Skoolsports, dedicated to introducing hockey to young children through courses and clinics, all over the UK.
