= Spycatcher (TV series) =

British television series

Spycatcher is a BBC television series, starring Bernard Archard, which ran from 1959 to 1961. It was based on the real-life activities of Dutch counterintelligence officer, Lieutenant-Colonel Oreste Pinto (once called "the greatest living authority on security"), who specialised in the interrogation of suspected spies during World War II and had later published his memoirs under the title Spy Catcher. Each episode showed Pinto (Archard) questioning refugees to England from Nazi-dominated Europe, and eventually exposing them as enemy agents (or, on two occasions, concluding that they were genuine refugees).

In 1960 a board game called Spycatcher inspired by the series was produced by J & L Randall under their Merit trading name.

There was also an earlier BBC Radio series, of 24 episodes, which covered the same cases in radio-drama form.

Unusual for BBC programming of the 1950s and early 60s, the series is thought to still exist, but has yet to be released publicly.
