= David Barr (English cricketer) =

English cricketer

Personal information
- Full name: David James Barr
- Born: 23 July 1970 (age 56); Coventry, Warwickshire, England
- Batting: Left-handed

Domestic team information
- Years: Team
- 2001–2002: Warwickshire Cricket Board
- 2003–2005: Buckinghamshire

Career statistics
Competition	List A
Matches	6
Runs scored	89
Batting average	14.83
100s/50s	0/1
Top score	51
Catches/stumpings	2/–
- Source: Cricinfo, 26 October 2010

David James Barr (born 23 July 1970) is an English cricketer. Barr is a left-handed batsman. He was born at Coventry, Warwickshire.

Barr represented the Warwickshire Cricket Board in List A cricket. His debut List A match came against the Leicestershire Cricket Board in the 2001 Cheltenham & Gloucester Trophy. From 2001 to 2002, he represented the Board in 4 List A matches, the last of which came against Herefordshire in the 1st round of the 2003 Cheltenham & Gloucester Trophy which was held in 2002.

In 2003, Barr joined Buckinghamshire. Barr made his Minor Counties Championship debut for the county against Lincolnshire in 2003. From 2003 to 2005, he represented the county in 11 Championship matches, the last of which came against Norfolk. He also represented the county in a single MCCA Knockout Trophy match against Suffolk in 2004.

He also represented Buckinghamshire in 2 List A matches. These were against Dorset in the 1st round of the 2004 Cheltenham & Gloucester Trophy which was held in 2003; and Lancashire in the 2005 Cheltenham & Gloucester Trophy. In his career total of 6 List A matches, he scored 89 runs at a batting average of 14.83, with a single half century high score of 51. In the field he took 2 catches.

He currently plays club cricket for Reading Cricket Club.

Following Barr's professional cricketing career he has taken up teaching. He has held various teaching posts in Reading, Nottingham and more recently in Hammersmith, London. Barr is known to have taught at The West London Free School having taken up the position of 'Assistant Head – Middle School and Communications' in June 2014.

In 2021, Barr began teaching Business Studies and Economics at Loughborough Schools Foundation.
