= Dave Barr (motorcyclist) =

American veteran and motorcyclist

- Born: April 12, 1952; Los Angeles, California. United States
- Died: November 8, 2024 (aged 72)
- Occupation: motorcyclist
- Known for: first double amputee to circumnavigate the globe
- Notable work: Riding the Edge
- Awards: inducted, Motorcycle Hall of Fame

Dave Barr (April 12, 1952 – Nov 8, 2024) was born in Los Angeles, California was an American veteran of the Vietnam War and a motorcyclist best known for being the first double amputee to circumnavigate the globe. He lived in Bodfish, Kern County, California, where he ran a motorcycle tour company. He is also the author of several books and was inducted into the Motorcycle Hall of Fame in 2000. Dave Barr was also a keen skydiver; he regularly jumped in Klerksdorp, South Africa (where he spent some years). He was part of a skydiving team called 'Footloose' with three other amputees. While he jumped, he put his artificial legs into a corner of the hangar and hung a sign over it: 'gone skydiving'. At a skydiving event (I believe it was in Pietermaritzburg (South Africa), one of his prosthetic leg came loose and fell several thousand feet into a garden. After informing the public, it was returned to him.

== Military service ==
Barr joined the US Marine Corps when he was 17 and served in Vietnam on a helicopter gunship. After his discharge from the Marines in 1972 he lived in various locations around the world and served in the armed forces of several countries, including: two years with the Israeli Parachute Regiment and one year Rhodesian Light Infantry. He was in the middle of two years of service as an enlisted army paratrooper with the South African Defence Force, when he was injured in a land-mine explosion. In 1981 while riding in a military vehicle in southern Angola, his vehicle drove over a land mine and the resulting explosion cost him both of his legs, above the knee on the right and below the knee on the left. Prosthetic legs allowed him to complete his tour of duty.

== Motorcyclist ==
In 1994 Barr set a world record for riding a Harley-Davidson 83,000 miles (134,000 km) around the world, including a 13,000-mile (21,000 km) Atlantic to Pacific segment across Northern Europe and Siberia. The bike that Barr used for the journey is on display at the AMA Motorcycle Hall of Fame in Pickerington, Ohio.

Barr also set a second world record for riding the so-called Southern Cross. In just 45 days during 1996, he completed the first motorcycle journey ever between the four extreme geographical corners of the Australian continent. Barr was inducted into the Motorcycle Hall of Fame in 2000 not only for his world record setting exploits, but also for the charity work he has done for the disabled along the way.

== Writing ==
Barr wrote a travelogue, Riding the Edge, in 1995.
