= Mark Barr =

English-American inventor and polymath (1871–1950)

James Mark McGinnis Barr (18 May 1871 – 15 December 1950) was an electrical engineer, physicist, inventor, and polymath known for proposing the standard notation for the golden ratio. Born in America, but with English citizenship, Barr lived in both London and New York City at different times of his life.

Though remembered primarily for his contributions to abstract mathematics, Barr put much of his efforts over the years into the design of machines, including calculating machines. He won a gold medal at the 1900 Paris Exposition Universelle for an extremely accurate engraving machine.

== Life ==
Barr was born in Pennsylvania, the son of Charles B. Barr and Ann M'Ginnis. He was educated in London, then worked for the Westinghouse Electric Company in Pittsburgh from 1887 to 1890. He started there as a draughtsman before becoming a laboratory assistant, and later an erection engineer. For two years in the early 1890s, he worked in New York City at the journal Electrical World as an assistant editor, at the same time studying chemistry at the New York City College of Technology, and by 1900, he had worked with both Nikola Tesla and Mihajlo Pupin in New York. However, he was known among acquaintances for his low opinion of Thomas Edison. Returning to London in 1892, he studied physics and electrical engineering at the City and Guilds of London Technical College for three years.

From 1896 to 1900, he worked for Linotype in England, and from 1900 to 1904, he worked as a technical advisor to Trevor Williams in London. Beginning in 1902, he was elected to the Small Screw Gauge Committee of the British Association for the Advancement of Science. The committee was set up to put into practice the system of British Association screw threads, which had been settled on but not implemented in 1884. More broadly, it was tasked with considering "the whole question of standardisation of engineering materials, tools, and machinery". In January 1916, Barr was given charge of a school for machinists in London, intended to supply workers to a nearby factory for machine guns for the war effort; the school closed that June, as the factory was unable to take on the new workers at the expected rate.

In the early 1920s, Barr was a frequent visitor to Alfred North Whitehead in Chelsea, London, but by 1924, he had moved back to New York. Hamlin Garland writes that, "after thirty years in London", Barr returned to America "in order that his young sons might become citizens". Garland quotes Barr as saying that, for him, "to abandon America would be an act of treason". In 1924, Harvard University invited Whitehead to join its faculty, with the financial backing of Henry Osborn Taylor. Barr, a friend of both Whitehead and Taylor, served as an intermediary in the preparations for this move. Whitehead, in subsequent letters to his son North in 1924 and 1925, writes of Barr's struggles to sell the design for one of his calculating machines to an unnamed large American company. In the 1925 letter, Whitehead writes that Barr's son Stephen was staying with him while Barr and his wife Mabel visited Elyria, Ohio, to oversee a test build of the device. However, by 1927, Barr and Whitehead had fallen out, Whitehead writing to North (amid much complaint about Barr's character) that he was "very doubtful whether he will keep his post at the business school here"; Barr was a "research assistant in finance" at Harvard Business School around this time.

Barr joined the Century Association in 1925, and in his later life it "became practically his home". He died in The Bronx in 1950.

== Contributions ==
=== Machining ===
At Linotype, Barr improved punch-cutting machines by substituting ball bearings for oil lubrication to achieve a more precise fit, and using tractrix-shaped sleeves to distribute wear uniformly. In an 1896 publication in The Electrical Review on calculating the dimensions of a ball race, Barr credits the bicycle industry for stimulating development of the perfectly spherical steel balls needed in this application.^{[B96]} The punch-cutters he worked on were, essentially, pantographs that could engrave copies of given shapes (the outlines of letters or characters) as three-dimensional objects at a much smaller scale (the punches used to shape each letter in hot metal typesetting). Between 1900 and 1902, with Linotype managers Arthur Pollen and William Henry Lock, Barr also designed pantographs operating on a very different scale, calculating aim for naval artillery based on the positions, headings, and speeds of the firing ship and its target.

=== Golden ratio ===
The Greek letter phi, symbol for the golden ratio

Barr was a friend of William Schooling, and worked with him in exploiting the properties of the golden ratio to develop arithmetic algorithms suitable for mechanical calculators. According to Theodore Andrea Cook, Barr gave the golden ratio the name of phi (Φ). Cook wrote that Barr chose Φ by analogy to the use of π for the ratio of a circle's circumference to its diameter, and because it is the first Greek letter in the name of the ancient sculptor Phidias. Although Martin Gardner later wrote that Phidias was chosen because he was "believed to have used the golden proportion frequently in his sculpture", Barr himself denied this, writing in his paper "Parameters of beauty" that he doubted Phidias used the golden ratio.^{[B29]} Schooling communicated some of his discoveries with Barr to Cook after seeing an article by Cook about phyllotaxis, the arrangement of leaves on a plant stem, which often approximates the golden ratio. Schooling published his work with Barr later, in 1915, employing the same notation. Barr also published a related work in The Sketch in around 1913, generalizing the Fibonacci numbers to higher-order recurrences.

=== Other inventions and discoveries ===
Around 1910, Barr built a lighting apparatus for painter William Nicholson, using filters and reflectors to mix different types of light to produce an "artificial reproduction of daylight". In 1914, as an expert in electricity, he took part in an investigation of psychic phenomena involving Polish medium Stanisława Tomczyk by the Society for Psychical Research; however, the results were inconclusive. At some point prior to 1916, Barr was a participant in a business venture to make synthetic rubber from turpentine by a bacterial process. However, after much effort in relocating the bacterium after exhausting the original supply (a barrel of vinegar from New Jersey), the process ended up being less cost-effective than natural rubber, and the business failed. With Edward George Boulenger of the London Zoo, he built a timer-operated electromechanical rat trap.

In preparation for a diving expedition to Haiti by William Beebe and the New York Zoological Society in early 1927, in which he participated as "physicist, master electrician, and philosopher", Barr helped develop an underwater telephone allowing divers to talk to a support boat, and a brass underwater housing for a motion picture camera.

== Selected publications ==
B96.	Barr, Mark (1896). "The ball race". The Electrical Review: 769–770.

B29.	Barr, Mark (1929). "Parameters of beauty". Architecture (NY). Vol. 60. p. 325. Reprinted: "Parameters of beauty". Think. Vol. 10–11. International Business Machines Corporation. 1944.

B30.	Barr, Mark (Winter 1930). "The Man and the Turtle". The Century. Vol. 120, no. 1. New York: The Century Company. pp. 18–28.
