= David Barr (Canadian Forces officer) =

Canadian Army officer

Colonel David Barr, CD, is a former commander of the Canadian Special Operations Forces Command.

== Biography ==
Barr's early military service included platoon command with the 3rd Battalion Princess Patricia's Canadian Light Infantry in Victoria, British Columbia (1980–84), and subsequently with the Canadian Airborne Regiment in Petawawa, Ontario (1984–87).

From 2007 to 2010, he was the chief of staff and deputy commander of Joint Task Force Games (JTFG), which provided support to secure Vancouver during the Vancouver 2010 Olympic and Paralympic Winter Games.

Barr was the first commander of CSOFC. During his tenure as commander, Barr also deployed to Afghanistan as commander of the Canadian special operations task force in Operation Enduring Freedom.
