= David Barr (playwright) =

American dramatist

David Barr III is an American writer and playwright of African descent.

== Career ==
As an actor, Barr received a Joseph Jefferson Citation for an Actor In A Principal Role for his portrayal of Philip Mbuso in the drama Victims at the Organic Theatre Greenhouse in 1992.

In 1994 he was a principal actor in the Chicago Theatre Company production of Pill Hill, which was the recipient of a Joseph Jefferson Award for Best Ensemble. Additional acting accolades that David has received include the Best Actor Award from the Association Of Theatre Artists & Friends in 1989 for his portrayal of Creon in the Stage Left production of Antigone.

Barr's first full-length play was The Death of the Black Jesus, which premiered at the Unicorn Theatre in Kansas City, Mo. in January 1995. (In the theater's pre-season booklet "21st Season of Plays," the title is given as Betrayal of the Black Jesus.) The success of this play led to an Illinois Arts Council Fellowship (1995) and the Black Theater Alliance Awards. The play was the winner of the National Playwriting Award sponsored by the Unicorn Theatre, and the winner of the Mixed Blood Versus America National Playwriting Contest sponsored by the Mixed Blood Theatre.

His adaptation of the Walter Mosley novel A Red Death had its world premiere in September 1997. It won the 1998 Edgar Allan Poe Award, sponsored by the Mystery Writers of America in the Best New Play category.

Barr's two-act drama, Black Caesar, was the winner of the 1997 Theodore Ward Contest for Playwriting, sponsored by Chicago's Columbia College. PerformInk, Chicago's entertainment trade paper, published Black Caesar in October 1999.

In January 1999, Barr received his second Illinois Arts Council Fellowship for Playwriting/Screenwriting. His play Ev'ry Time I Feel the Spirit, based on the life of Marian Anderson, was the winner of the 1999 Unicorn Theatre National Playwriting Award. It opened at the Unicorn Theatre in June 1999 and at Pegasus Players in November 2000.

In September 1999, his full-length play The Face of Emmett Till (formerly The State of Mississippi vs Emmett Till) debuted at Pegasus Players. The play was developed with Mrs. Mamie Till Mobley and is based on the life and tragic death of her son Emmett Till and was revived in the fall of 2003, again at Pegasus Players.

== 2000 To Present ==
Barr is a co-adapter of The Journal of Ordinary Thought, a stage adaptation of poems and monologues written by members of the Neighborhood Writing Alliance. The Journal of Ordinary Thought had its world premiere at the Chicago Theatre Company in September 1999. It was voted one of the best plays of 1999 by both the Chicago Tribune and the Chicago Sun-Times. In March 2000 it was named winner of the Festival of Emerging American Theatre (FEAT) National Playwriting Competition, sponsored by Phoenix Theatre Company in Indianapolis, and played there in the spring of 2000.

In 2001, Barr received his third Illinois Arts Council Fellowship for Playwriting/Screenwriting. His play Bronzeville opened at the Pegasus Players Theater, but reviews were negative.

Barr's screen adaptation of the Zora Neale Hurston short story "The Gilded Six Bits" was selected for the 2008 International Black Harvest Film Festival. The film was aired on the Chicago and Gary, Indiana PBS affiliates WTTW and WYIN. The movie was screened at several 2006 and 2007 film festivals across the United States and was named Best Picture at the 2006 Twin Cities Film Festival. It was screened at the annual "Zora Fest" in Eatonville, Florida earlier that same year.

Barr's play The Upper Room was performed at Truman College in 2005. http://www.btaawards.org/index.html His Civil Rights docudrama My Soul is a Witness, produced by The Jena Company, New York City toured nationally in 2005 and 2006 and a Pegasus Players production of the work was included in the Hindu MetroPlus Theatre Arts Festival in Chennai, India during the Summer of 2007. My Soul is a Witness subsequently played in the cities of Kolkata, New Delhi and Mumbai. His second engagement with The Jena Company was the biopic Jackie, Vi, and Lena which toured nationally during the Winter of 2007.

In the Spring 2006 he co-authored the vaudevillian production "Point Of Revue", a composite shot of African American through a collection of short plays and original songs, with several artists including Kia Corthron, Don Cheadle and Lynn Nottage.

Barr's screenplay Death of Innocence was co-written with Christopher Benson, Associate Professor of African American Studies, and Journalism at the University of Illinois, and with Oscar-winning director James Moll. It was adapted from a memoir co-written by Benson and the late, Civil Rights activist Mamie Till-Mobley. It was optioned for development by HBO Films in 2007.
