= Norman B. Barr =

Founder of children's camp

Norman Burton Barr (1868–1943) was an American Presbyterian minister who established a children's program at the Olivet Institute in Chicago.

== Biography ==
In September 1894, after graduating from the University of Nebraska, Barr entered the McCormick Theological Seminary of the Presbyterian Church in Chicago. On December 20, 1894, he married Minnie Dearstyne. Barr was ordained on May 10, 1897.

== Norman B. Barr Camp ==
After his ordination, Barr accepted his first pastoral assignment as the regular minister at Olivet Memorial Church in Chicago. The church was located at 665 Vedder Street on the near north side. When Rev. Barr arrived, he was given responsibility for all religious work connected with the church at Vedder and Penn streets. The general area was known as "Little Hell" due to issues with poverty, crime and unemployment, including families living doubled up in houses and brick tenements of four and five stories.

N. B. W. Gallwey had previously founded the Olivet Social Institute at the church.

In 1908, Rev. Barr was a speaker at a conference held at the YMCA camp (now Aurora University) on Geneva Lake in Wisconsin. During his visit, while on a work along a shore path past a piece of property advertised for sale by Alice B. Stockman, M.D, he allegedly immediately viewed the property as ideal for a permanent camp for the institute. He made a down payment using $50 borrowed from a colleague and purchased the land for approximately $9,000 in January 1909, naming it to the Olivet Institute Camp.

The housing at the camp consisted of tents and water was transported from a spring at neighboring Holiday Home; Kerosene was used for lighting and cooking. Food requiring refrigeration was stored in the ground until an ice house was later built. It was accessed by members of the Olivet Institute by train from Chicago to Williams Bay then by boat to the camp. Cottages were later built to replace the tents and the grounds were developed further, including building a sewer system and showers and adding electricity.

Barr did work to raise money for the camp and its children's programs, retiring from the Olivet Church in 1937; though, he remained active at the camp, most notably fighting to prevent a foreclosure of the property which would only be successful in late 1943 after he had died of a heart attack. In 1946, the camp became a non-profit corporation consisting entirely of volunteer workers and was renamed the Norman B. Barr Camp (NBBC).

The practice of weekly religious services at the camp continues today, held at the Bowman Chapel every Sunday during the summer season, and free Christian summer camp sessions continue to be offered to children in Chicago and surrounding areas.
