= Jon Laurimore =

English retired actor (born 1936)

- Born: Jon St. Alban Livermore; Between late March and 30 June 1936 (age 90); Southend-on-Sea, Essex, England
- Occupation: Actor
- Years active: 1959–2010
- Spouse(s): Zoe Hicks (m. 1959, divorced) Jill Simonson (m. 1968)
- Children: 2

Jon St. Alban Laurimore (born between late March and 30 June 1936) is an English retired actor, known for his television appearances.

== Early life ==
Originally, he planned to become a farmer and spent some years as an apprentice farmer manager for two-and-a-half years before joining the Royal Air Force, developing a love for flying and acting. While waiting three months before going to agricultural college, Laurimore joined a local theatre as an assistant stage manager. There, he fell in love with an actress and decided to change career path.

== Career ==
Beginning as Jon Livermore, he changed his surname to Laurimore in 1959.

His TV credits include The Avengers, The Prisoner, Z-Cars, Dixon of Dock Green, Public Eye, Warship, Sutherland's Law, The Onedin Line, Rock Follies, Space: 1999, Doctor Who (in the serial The Masque of Mandragora), I, Claudius, Target, Secret Army, Reilly, Ace of Spies, Minder, Dalziel and Pascoe and Jack the Ripper. He also appeared as police officers in the films A Touch of the Other (1970) and Die Screaming, Marianne (1971).

== Personal life ==
Jon married Zoe Hicks (the aforementioned actress) in 1959 and they later divorced. In 1968, he married Jill Simonson, who later became a television scriptwriter. They had two children, Sophie Laurimore and Dido Laurimore.

He now lives with his family in Suffolk, England.
