= Derek Newark =

British actor (1933–1998)

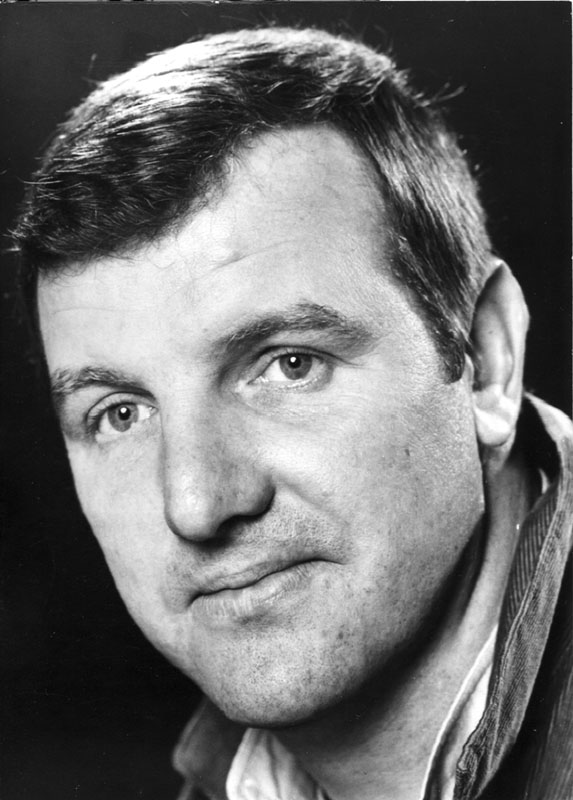
- Newark in the 1970s
- Born: Derek John Newark; 8 June 1933; Great Yarmouth, Norfolk, England
- Died: 11 August 1998 (aged 65); Hammersmith, London, England
- Education: Royal Academy of Dramatic Art
- Occupation: Actor
- Years active: 1961–1996
- Spouse: Jean Thornhill (m. 1958; div. 1988)
- Children: 2

Derek John Newark (8 June 1933 – 11 August 1998) was an English actor in television, film and theatre.

== Early life and military service ==
Derek Newark was born in Great Yarmouth, Norfolk, in 1933, the youngest of three sons to George William Newark (1894-1972) and Ella Marie (née Finch) (1897-1962).

Newark began his working life with the Merchant Navy in 1949 and later joined the Union-Castle Line as a trainee steward. In the early 1950s he attempted to launch a career in comedy, appearing in several small shows and talent competitions in London, while working as an assistant salesman at a tailor's shop.

In 1953 Newark received his National Service papers, and he subsequently served in the Coldstream Guards. In March 1955 he was appointed to a three year short service commission with the Royal Army Service Corps, eventually being promoted to Lieutenant. While stationed in Malaya, Newark was a regular contributor to the Gurkhas’ Forces Radio, developing the on-air character of "Jackie Styles".

== Stage career ==
At the end of his three year commission, Newark returned to England in 1958. He subsequently began studying at the Royal Academy of Dramatic Art, and graduated in 1960.

Newark was one of several members of the RADA class of 1960 who participated in a 10-week season of performances in Bangor, Northern Ireland, organised by the Council for the Encouragement of Music and the Arts (CEMA) and Bangor Borough Council, starting in July 1960. The group presented performances of Mr. Kettle and Mrs. Moon, Agatha Christie's The Hollow, and Ben Travers's Rookery Nook.

In early 1961, Newark joined the English Stage Company, appearing in several productions at the Royal Court Theatre, which the company had purchased in 1956. In February, he played Jasperino in the Jacobean tragedy The Changeling; the first staging of the play since the 17^{th} century. Following this, in April, Newark was among the cast for an English translated production of Jean-Paul Satre’s The Condemned of Altona, retitled simply to Altona, at the Royal Court, preceded by a short tour to cities like Liverpool and Newcastle.

From the summer of 1961 until early 1962, Newark was a member of the resident company of the Belgrade Theatre, Coventry, first appearing in a two week run of J. B. Priestley's When We Are Married, as well as productions of Harold Pinter's The Caretaker, and A. A. Milne's Toad of Toad Hall. Among Newark's contemporaries at this time were Bridget Turner, Mark Eden, and Ian McKellen.

In the 1970s, Newark became involved with the Royal National Theatre. While there he was part of the company that opened its current South Bank home and was a cornerstone of the residential company that worked in the smaller Cottesloe Theatre under Bill Bryden's direction. His most important roles there were Bottom in A Midsummer Night's Dream and the world premiere of David Mamet's Glengarry Glen Ross where he played Shelley Levene (a role later played on screen by Jack Lemmon). At the National he also appeared as Malcolm in Alan Ayckbourn's Bedroom Farce, which transferred to the West End and then Broadway. He also created the role of Roote in Harold Pinter's play The Hothouse which premiered in 1980 in a production directed by the playwright.

== Film and television career ==
Newark appeared in a large number of film and television roles, his first being a 1961 production of Sergeant Musgrave's Dance for ITV's Play of the Week. Between 1964 and 1975 he appeared in series including The Baron (1967), The Avengers (three episodes in the 1960s), Department S, Z-Cars (six episodes between 1969 and 1972), Barlow in the regular role of Det. Insp. Tucker (1974–1975) and various other minor roles. He appeared in episodes two to four of the first Doctor Who story An Unearthly Child in 1963, and later appeared opposite Jon Pertwee in the 1970 story Inferno. Newark also played the role of Spooner, an ill-tempered former Red Devil turned professional wrestler in the series Rising Damp.

Amongst later work on television, he starred in the second series of Juliet Bravo as Councillor Jack Winterbottom. In 1982, Newark played Martin Bormann in the TV series Inside the Third Reich. He appeared as W. C. Fields with Caroline Quentin in the 1983 Channel 4 play Hollywood Hits Chiswick. His final TV role was in an episode of The Bill, broadcast in October 1996.

In the cinema Newark appeared opposite Oliver Reed in Michael Winner's The System (1964), as well as Jessard, sidekick to Sgt. Johnson (Sean Connery) in the police drama The Offence (Sidney Lumet, 1972).

== Personal life and death ==
Newark met his future wife, Jean, while she was stationed in Singapore as a teacher with the Royal Army Educational Corps, and they were married after he returned to the UK in 1958. They divorced in 1988.

Newark died of a heart attack, brought on by liver failure after years of alcoholism, on 11 August 1998 at Charing Cross Hospital, aged 65. His remains were cremated, and his ashes were scattered into the River Thames outside the Royal National Theatre.

== Filmography ==
=== Film ===
Year	Title	Role	Notes
1964	The System	Alfred	Uncredited
1964	The Black Torment	Coachman Tom	
1965	City Under the Sea	Dan	
1965	The Little Ones	Det. Wilson	
1966	The Blue Max	Ziegel	
1968	Where Eagles Dare	German Major	Uncredited
1969	Oh! What a Lovely War	Shooting Gallery Proprietor	
1970	Fragment of Fear	Sergeant Matthews	
1970	The Breaking of Bumbo	C.S.M Peters	
1971	Dad's Army	Regimental Sergeant Major	
1971	Venom	Johann	
1973	The Offence	Jessard	
1974	The Black Windmill	Monitoring Policeman	
1976	Escape from the Dark	Unknown	
1987	Bellman and True	Guv'nor	

=== Television ===
Year	Title	Episode(s)	Role	Network	Archive status
1961	ITV Play of the Week	Series 7, Episode 8: Serjeant Musgrave's Dance	Dragoon Sjt.	ITV (Granada)	Exists
1961	Deadline Midnight	Series 3, Episode 11: The Tenpenny Scandal	Mechanic	ITV (ATV)	Exists
1962	Probation Officer	Series 4, Episode 12	Customs officer	ITV (ATV)	Exists
1962	Out of this World	Episode 8: Vanishing Act	Insp. Wright	ITV (ABC)	Missing
1962	The Caucasian Chalk Circle	All 4 episodes	Trooper	BBC Television	Partial (episodes 1 & 4 survive)
1962	Harpers West One	Series 2, Episode 15: The Fur Coat In the Sale	Jerry Barker	ITV (ATV)	Missing
1963	The Birth of a Private Man	TV Movie	Jack	BBC Television	Missing
1963	The Plane Makers	Series 1, Episode 4: The Blunt Approach	Alf Skinner	ITV (ATV)	Missing
1963	The Sunday Play	Series 4, Episode 40: You Can't Throw Your Mates	George	BBC Television	Missing
1963	ITV Play of the Week	Series 8, Episode 46: End of Conflict	Private Varley	ITV (Anglia)	Exists
1963	The Sunday Play	Series 4, Episode 48: Plain Jane	Fred	BBC Television	Missing
1963	Doctor Who	Series 1: An Uneartly Child (3 episodes)	Za	BBC Television	Exists
1964	The Avengers	Series 3, Episode 20: Trojan Horse	Johnson	ITV (ABC)	Exists
1964	No Hiding Place	Series 6, Episode 5: Line of Fire	Sgt. Wallis	ITV (Rediffusion)	Missing
1964	The Villains	Series 2, Episode 3: Victim	D.S. Brough	ITV (Granada)	Exists
1964	Redcap	Series 1, Episode 1: It's What Comes After	Mess Sergeant	ITV (ABC)	Exists
1964	The Wednesday Play	Episode 1: A Crack in the Ice	Private Postnikov	BBC One	Exists
1964	The Chimney Boy	TV Movie	Sailor	BBC One	Exists
1965	ITV Play of the Week	Series 10, Episode 19: Women Beware Women	Ward	ITV (Granada)	Exists
1965	The Human Jungle	Series 2, Episode 11: Wild Goose Chase	Police officer	ITV (ABC)	Exists
1965	Front Page Story	13 episodes	Joe Harwood	ITV (ATV)	Exists
1965	Serjeant Musgrave's Dance	All 3 episodes	Private Hurst	BBC One	Exists
1965	Knock On Any Door	Series 1, Episode 7: There's Always an Angle	Flynn	ITV (ATV)	Exists
1966	Softly, Softly	Series 1, Episode 4: It Doesn’t Grow on Trees	Alec Bridges	BBC One	Partial (approx. half survives)
1966	The Likely Lads	Series 3, Episode 7: Love and Marriage	Duggie	BBC Two	Missing
1966	No Hiding Place	Series 9, Episode 12: A Home Posting	Sgt. Black	ITV (Rediffusion)	Exists
1966	Coronation Street	Episodes 604 & 605	Det. Bill Sharp	ITV (Granada)	Exists
1966	The Baron	Series 1, Episode 3: Something for a Rainy Day	Lucas	ITV (ITC)	Exists
1966	Blackmail	Series 2, Episode 7: The Haunting of Aubrey Hopkiss	Arthur Clegg	ITV (Rediffusion)	Exists
1966	Drama '66	Series 6, Episode 3: Conduct to the Prejudice	Sgt. Dangerfield	ITV (ATV)	Exists
1967	The Baron	Series 1, Episodes 15-16	Calvin Baggio	ITV (ITC)	Exists
1967	The Avengers	Series 5, Episode 1: From Venus With Love	Crawford	ITV (ABC)	Exists
1967	The Saint	Series 5, Episode 20: The Counterfeit Countess	Carl	ITV (ITC)	Exists
1967	Emergency Ward 10	Series 3, Episode 16: Mock Flight	Capt. Leo Baring	ITV (ATV)	Missing
1967	Theatre 625	Series 4, Episde 24: Firebrand	Col. Karl Ernst	BBC Two	Exists
1967	Callan	Series 1, Episode 6: You Should Have Got Here Sooner	Loder	ITV (ABC)	Exists
1967	The White Rabbit	Episodes 1 and 3	Prison guard/the barker	BBC Two	Missing
1967	ITV Playhouse	Series 1, Episode 5: The Thorn in the Flesh	Sgt. Huber	ITV (Granada)	Exists
1967	Man in a Suitcase	Series 1, Episode 10: All That Glitters	Rudy	ITV (ITC)	Exists
1967	Vanity Fair	Series 1, Episode 5: Vanitas Vanitatum	McMurdo	BBC Two	Exists
1968	Look at Life: Deer Hunters	Documentary	Narrator	Rank Org.	Unknown
1968	The Gamblers	Series 1, Episode 1: Read 'em and Weep	Redgrave	ITV (Rediffusion)	Missing
1968	Half Hour Story	Series 2, Episode 4: Out of the Playground	Bill Bolton	ITV (Rediffusion)	Missing
1968	Man in a Suitcase	Series 1, Episode 20: Blind Spot	Maurice	ITV (ITC)	Exists
1968	Coronation Street	Episodes 797 & 798	Det. Bill Sharp	ITV (Granada)	Exists
1968	The Caesars	Series 1, Episode 1: Augustus	Agrippa Postumus	ITV (Granada)	Exists
1968	Thirty-Minute Theatre	Series 4, Episode 4: The Chequers Manoeuvre	Bert Gregson	BBC Two	Exists
1968	Z-Cars	Series 6, Episodes 165-166: Vigilance Part 1/2	Dunnock	BBC One	Missing
1968	Mr. Rose	Series 3, Episode 5: Free and Easy	Thomas Lundy	ITV (Granada)	Exists
1968	NET Playhouse	Series 3, Episode 9: A Crack in the Ice	Private Postnikov	NET	Unknown
1968	The Saint	Series 6, Episode 14: Where the Money Is	German	ITV (ITC)	Exists
1969	The Avengers	Series 6, Episode 20: Wish You Were Here	Vickers	ITV (Thames)	Exists
1969	The Champions	Series 1, Episode 28: The Final Countdown	Kruger	ITV (ITC)	Exists
1969	Judge Dee	Series 1, Episode 6: The Curse of the Lacquer Screen	Corporal	ITV (Granada)	Missing
1969	Z-Cars	Series 6, Episodes 238-239: You've Got to Keep Them Talking	Matt Colley	BBC One	Missing
1970	Manhunt	Series 1, Episode 2: Break-Up	Henri	ITV (LWT)	Exists
1970	Department S	Series 2, Episode 12: The Last Train to Redbridge	Clark	ITV (ITC)	Exists
1970	Doctor Who	Series 7, Episodes 19-25: Inferno	Greg Sutton	BBC One	Exists
1970	Big Brother	Series 1, Episode 4: There's Always a First Time	Miller	ITV (LWT)	Exists
1971	The Ten Commandments	Series 1, Episode 3: Be Lucky	Bernard Williams	ITV (Yorkshire)	Exists
1971	Budgie	Series 1, Episode 13: And in Again	Det. Insp. Bryant	ITV (LWT)	Exists
1971	Paul Temple	Series 4, Episode 6: The Quick and the Dead	Det. Insp. Hilton	BBC One	Exists
1971	ITV Sunday Night Theatre	Series 4, Episode 1: The Wedding Gift	Pete	ITV (LWT)	Exists
1971	Coronation Street	Episodes 1110 & 1111	Det. Insp. Bill Sharp	ITV (Granada)	Exists
1971	Thirty-Minute Theatre	Series 7, Episode 3: Gun Play	Dolan	BBC Two	Missing
1971	Dixon of Dock Green	Series 18, Episode 2: The Fighter	Eddie Brown	BBC One	Missing
1971	Jason King	Series 1, Episode 8: A Red Red Rose Forever	Hartman	ITV (ITC)	Exists
1971	The Persuaders!	Series 1, Episode 12: That's Me Over There	Lloyd	ITV (ITC)	Exists
1972	Thirty-Minute Theatre	Series 7, Episode 18: They Don't All Open Men's Boutiques	Wilf Hardiman	BBC Two	Missing
1972	Budgie	Series 2, Episodes 4-5: The Jump Up Boys / Our Story So Far	Det. Insp. Bryant	ITV (LWT)	Exists
1972	Z-Cars	Series 7, Episodes 64-65: Forget It Pts. 1 & 2	Harry Hayes	BBC One	Partial (Part 1 only)
1972	The Edwardians	Episode 5: Baden-Powell	Meadows	BBC Two	Exists
1972	Lord Peter Wimsey	The Unpleasantness at the Bellona Club; Episodes 6-7, 9	Bunter	BBC One	Exists
1972	The Adventures of Black Beauty	Series 1, Episode 21: Two of a Kind	Bellowes	ITV (LWT)	Exists
1973	Justice	Series 2, Episode 7: After All, What Is a Lie?	Tom Bradley	ITV (Yorkshire)	Exists
1973	Crown Court	Series 2, Episodes 47-48: The Gilded Cage Pts. 1 & 2	Robert Scard	ITV (Granada)	Exists
1973	New Scotland Yard	Series 3, Episode 1: Where's Harry?	Harry Logan	ITV (LWT)	Exists
1973	General Hospital	Episode 87: Dr Leigh Gets a New Shock About Ann	Ronnie Singer	ITV (ATV)	Missing
1973	Spy Trap	Series 2, Episode 2: Anything Lethal Considered	Colonel Kretmar	BBC One	Missing
1973	The Adventures of Black Beauty	Series 2, Episode 4: Good Neighbours	Fletcher	ITV (LWT)	Exists
1973	Crown Court	Series 2, Episodes 125-126: Hit and Miss Pts. 2 & 3	Leonard Hooper	ITV (Granada)	Exists
1974	Barlow	Series 3, all 8 episodes	D.I. Eddie Tucker	BBC One	Exists
1974	The Protectors	Series 2, Episode 19: The Tiger and the Goat	Reece	ITV (ATV)	Exists
1974	The Wonderful World of Disney	US TV broadcast of Diamonds on Wheels, split into 3 parts	Mercer	Disney	Exists
1974	QB VII	Episode 2	Mr. Graham	ABC	Exists
1974	My Name Is Harry Worth	Series 1, Episode 4: Don't Bank on It	Mick	ITV (Thames)	Exists
1974	A Little Bit of Wisdom	Series 1, Episode 6: And I Mean That Most Sincerely	Security guard	ITV (ATV)	Missing
1974	Rising Damp	Series 1, Episodes 3 & 5: A Night Out / All Our Yesterdays	Spooner	ITV (Yorkshire)	Exists
1975	The Two Ronnies	Series 4, Episode 1	D.I. Eddie Tucker	BBC One	Exists
1975	Barlow	Series 4, all episodes	D.I. Eddie Tucker	BBC One	Partial (3 episodes survive)
1975	Churchill's People	Episode 13: The Whip of Heaven	Sir John Dudley	BBC One	Exists
1978	Rumpole of the Bailey	Series 1, Episode 6: Rumpole and the Heavy Brigade	Basil Delgado	ITV (Thames)	Exists
1978	Born and Bred	Series 1, Episode 5: Ever So Goosey	Dawson	ITV (Thames)	Exists
1978	Some Mothers Do 'Ave 'Em	Series 3, Episode 5: King of the Road	Mr. Hunt	BBC One	Exists
1979	Return of the Saint	Series 1, Episode 20: The Obona Affair	Wright	ITV (ITC)	Exists
1979	Citizen Smith	Series 3, Episode 3: The Big Job	Car dealer	BBC One	Exists
1979	Just Watch It	Merchant Navy promo film	Unknown	Unknown	Unknown
1980	Bedroom Farce	TV Movie	Malcolm	ITV (Granada)	All programmes exist from this point
1981	Masada	Episodes 3-4	Engineering officer	ABC	All programmes exist from this point
1981	Private Schulz	Series 1, Episode 3	Publican	BBC Two	All programmes exist from this point
1981	Only Fools and Horses	Series 1, Episode 6: The Russians Are Coming	Eric the policeman	BBC One	All programmes exist from this point
1981	Juliet Bravo	Series 2, Episode 9: Gorgeous	Jack Winterbottom	BBC One	All programmes exist from this point
1981	Seconds Out	Series, Episode 1: Round 7	Joe Brindle	BBC One	All programmes exist from this point
1982	The Hothouse	TV Movie	Roote	BBC Two	All programmes exist from this point
1982	Inside the Third Reich	TV Movie	Martin Bormann	ABC	All programmes exist from this point
1982	Crown Court	Series 11, Episodes 29-30: Soldier, Soldier Pts. 2-3	Sergeant Waxloe	ITV (Granada)	All programmes exist from this point
1983	Reilly, Ace of Spies	Episode 2: Prelude to War	General Stoessel	ITV (Thames)	All programmes exist from this point
1983	Hollywood Hits Chiswick	TV Movie	W. C. Fields	Channel 4	All programmes exist from this point
1983	Dramarama	Series 1, Episode 4: Jack and the Computer	Mr. Bateston	ITV (TVS)	All programmes exist from this point
1984	Just Good Friends	Series 2, Episodes 2 and 8	Eddie Brown	BBC One	All programmes exist from this point
1984	Travelling Man	Series 1, Episodes 1 and 6	D.C.S. Sullivan	ITV (Granada)	All programmes exist from this point
1985	Hitler's SS: Portrait in Evil	TV Movie	Theodor Eicke	NBC	All programmes exist from this point
1985	The Mysteries	All 3 episodes	Abraham/First Soldier	Channel 4	All programmes exist from this point
1986	Lytton's Diary	Series 2, Episode 2: Rules of Engagement	Charlie Rigby	ITV (Thames)	All programmes exist from this point
1986	Chance in a Million	Series 2, Episode 3: The Lost Weekend	Arthur	Channel 4	All programmes exist from this point
1986	The Holy City	TV Movie	Stiles	BBC One	All programmes exist from this point
1986	Four to One	TV Movie	Len	BBC One	All programmes exist from this point
1986	The Deliberate Death of a Polish Priest	TV Movie	Colonel Pietruska	Channel 4	All programmes exist from this point
1986	Dempsey and Makepeace	Series 3, Episode 10: Guardian Angel	Corman	ITV (LWT)	All programmes exist from this point
1987	Sunday Premiere	Episode: Harry's Kingdom	Bob Roberts	BBC One	All programmes exist from this point
1987	Alas Smith & Jones	Series 4, Episode 2	Police sergeant	BBC One	All programmes exist from this point
1988	Singles	Series 1, Episode 4: Money, Money, Money	Mr. Broadbent	ITV (Yorkshire)	All programmes exist from this point
1988	Tickets for the Titanic	Series 2, Episode 1: Pastoral Care	Brock	Channel 4	All programmes exist from this point
1988	ScreenPlay	Series 3, Episode 10: Starlings	Mr. Vernon	BBC Two	All programmes exist from this point
1988	A Taste for Death	Series 1, Episode 3	Gordon Halliwell	ITV (Anglia)	All programmes exist from this point
1988	War and Remembrance	Episode 2	SS Sgt. Maj. Klinger	ABC	All programmes exist from this point
1989	Shadow of the Noose	Series 1, Episode 4: Beside the Sea	Van der Hogh	BBC Two	All programmes exist from this point
1989	The Nineteenth Hole	All 7 episodes	Bennett	ITV (Central)	All programmes exist from this point
1989	The Bill	Series 5, Episode 77: Greig vs. Taylor	Eric Taylor	ITV (Thames)	All programmes exist from this point
1989	Saracen	Series 1, Episode 8: Crossfire	Metcalf	ITV (Central)	All programmes exist from this point
1989	The Paradise Club	Series 1, Episode 7: Short Story	Bobby Mulgrew	BBC One	All programmes exist from this point
1991	Madness	Episodes 1 and 2	Reenactments	BBC Two	All programmes exist from this point
1991	An Actor's Life for Me	Series 1, Episode 5: Night of the Living Dead	Bill Mortimer	BBC One	All programmes exist from this point
1992	Screen One	Series 4, Episode 5: Seconds Out	Jimmy	BBC One	All programmes exist from this point
1993	The Bill	Series 9, Episode 138: Cutting Edge	Jim Whatley	ITV (Thames)	All programmes exist from this point
1994	99-1	Series 1, Episode 4: Where the Money Is	Hicks	ITV (Carlton)	All programmes exist from this point
1996	The Bill	Series 12, Episode 130: Telling Tales	Mike Walker	ITV (Thames)	All programmes exist from this point

== Theatre work ==
- Bedroom Farce (1977)
- The Hothouse (1980)
- A Midsummer Night's Dream (1982)
- The Mayor of Zalamea (1982)
- Glengarry Glen Ross (1983)
- Golden Boy (1984)
