= Elwyn Jones (writer) =

Welsh television writer and producer (1923–1982)

- Jones in 1965
- Born: Elwyn John Jones; 4 May 1923; Cwmaman, Aberdare, Glamorgan, Wales
- Died: 19 May 1982 (aged 59); Llandysul, Cardiganshire, Wales
- Education: LSE
- Occupations: Writer, producer
- Spouse: Nancy Acly (m. 1975; died 1982)
- Children: 1

Elwyn John Jones (4 May 1923 – 19 May 1982) was a Welsh television writer and producer, who co-created the police drama series Z-Cars for BBC Television in 1962. Later, he devised Softly, Softly (1966–69), Softly, Softly: Taskforce (1969–76), Barlow at Large/Barlow (1971, 1973–75), Jack the Ripper (1973) and Second Verdict (1976). A prolific television drama writer from the early 1960s until the late 1970s; from 1963 to 1966, he was Head of Drama (Series) at the BBC, under Head of Drama Group Sydney Newman, the first person to hold that post after Newman divided the drama group into Series, Serials and Plays divisions.

== Early life and education ==
Jones was born on 4 May 1923, in Cwmaman, Aberdare. His father, Evan Jones, was a local councillor and checkweigher. He attended Cwmaman Boys Council Elementary School from 1930 to 1935, and then Aberdare Boys County School from 1935 to 1942. Afterwards, he studied at the London School of Economics, leaving in 1944.

== Career ==
Jones began his career in journalism; firstly with New Review as a reporter, and then later as features editor. He was there for six years, until the magazine ceased publication in 1950. It was in the 1950s, when he started his association with the BBC, as assistant to the literary editor of the Radio Times, and latterly as Television Editor to 1957.

Between 1957 and 1966, he became a prolific screenwriter and producer, his first production being screened in Sunday Night Theatre in 1959. In 1963, he was made Head of Drama (Series), holding the position for the next three years. Before this, in 1961, he had co-created Z-Cars, which was seen as a more realistic alternative to Dixon of Dock Green. He wrote several scripts for Z-Cars, the spin-off Softly, Softly, the subsequent revamp Softly, Softly: Taskforce, and Barlow at Large, another co-creation of his. Further spinoffs featuring the character Barlow were aired in 1973, with Jack the Ripper, and in 1976, with Second Verdict.

Jones became a freelance writer from 1965 until his death in 1982. He wrote regularly for The Sunday Telegraph, and was the author of several true crime novels including The Last Two to Hang (1966; for which he won the Edgar Allan Poe Award from the Mystery Writers of America), The Ripper File (1973; co-written with John Lloyd), On Trial: Seven Intriguing Cases of Capital Crime (1978); The Deep Concern (1979) and Death Files (1981).

== Personal life ==
In 1975, Jones married Nancy Acly. Together, the couple had a daughter. On 19 May 1982, Jones died suddenly at his home near Llandysul, Cardiganshire.
