= Softly, Softly: Task Force =

British police procedural TV series (1969–1976)

- Created by: Troy Kennedy Martin; Elwyn Jones
- Starring: Stratford Johns; Frank Windsor; Terence Rigby; Norman Bowler; Walter Gotell; David Lloyd Meredith
- Country of origin: United Kingdom
- No. of series: 8
- No. of episodes: 149 (list of episodes)

Production
- Running time: 50 minutes

Original release
- Network: BBC1
- Release: 20 November 1969 – 15 December 1976

Softly, Softly: Task Force is a police procedural series which ran on BBC1 from 1969 to 1976. It was a revamp of Softly, Softly, itself a spin-off from Z-Cars. The change was made partly to coincide with the coming of colour broadcasting to the BBC's main channel BBC1. The programme was due to be called simply Task Force, but reluctant to sacrifice a much-loved brand the BBC compromised this so it became Softly, Softly: Task Force.

== Outline ==
At the end of Softly Softly, the main characters – Detective Chief Superintendent Barlow (Stratford Johns) and Detective Inspector Watt (Frank Windsor) – both applied for the role of head of CID at the newly formed police force, the fictional Thamesford Constabulary, which was said to be a product of amalgamations carried out during a recent reorganisation of the British police and is referred to as the third largest force in Britain.

Barlow is appointed to the role, which though more prestigious because of the size of Thamesford Constabulary, carries the same rank (chief superintendent) as his current role as deputy co-ordinator of the Southwest Regional Crime Squad. There is also a vacancy for a deputy head of CID and Watt as runner up is appointed gaining the rank of detective superintendent. Upon arrival in Thamesford, Barlow recommends the formation of two task forces. These are set up and Watt is made commander of Number One Task Force in addition to his duties as deputy head of CID. Harry Hawkins (Norman Bowler), seen as a detective sergeant in the South West Regional Crime Squad in Softly Softly, has become a uniformed inspector at Thamesford and is quickly made a detective inspector in Number One Task Force.

Although there is said to be a Number Two Task Force, the series centres on the activities of Number One Task Force usually referred to simply as "the task force". The task force contains a mixture of CID and uniform personnel and is meant to provide a resource for use in big operations. Though at times the task force has roles such as policing a football match, providing security for a visiting senator and responding to a terrorist incident at an airport, they are mostly shown assisting Barlow and Watt to solve murders and other crimes. This CID bias makes most episodes quite reminiscent of those in the previous series.

The stories were set in the fictional south-eastern English borough of Kingley (played by Rochester and the Medway area of Kent), where the team were under the baleful eye of Chief Constable Cullen (Walter Gotell).

The story saw Barlow widowed in 1972, after which he was headhunted by the Home Office to work on special cases (this became the series Barlow at Large). This left the way clear for Watt to come out of Barlow's shadow and take command in his own right, with the reliable assistance of Hawkins. Regulars included Terence Rigby as dog handler PC Snow with his dogs Inky and Radar, David Lloyd Meredith (Sgt Evans) and Walter Gotell (Chief Con. Cullen).

== Series overview ==
Series	Episodes	Originally released	
Series	Episodes	First released	Last released
1	16	20 November 1969	12 March 1970
2	26	16 September 1970	10 March 1971
3	26	6 October 1971	29 March 1972
4	20	13 September 1972	31 January 1973
5	18	12 September 1973	16 January 1974
6	13	4 September 1974	27 November 1974
7	15	27 August 1975	3 December 1975
8	15	8 September 1976	15 December 1976

== Cast ==
Actor	Character	Years active	Series active	Episode count
Stratford Johns	DCS Charlie Barlow	1969–1972	1–4	56
Frank Windsor	D Sup./DCS John Watt	1969–1976	1–8	123
Norman Bowler	Insp./DI/CI/DCI Harry Hawkins	1969–1976	1–8	113
Walter Gotell	Chief Con. Arthur Cullen	1969–1975	1–7	55
David Lloyd Meredith	Sgt./DS/DI Bob Evans	1969–1976	1–8	106
David Allister	Sgt./Insp Richard Jackson	1969–1971	1–2	22
Susan Tebbs	P/W DC Betty Donald	1969–1971	1–2	26
Terence Rigby	PC Henry Snow	1969–1976	1–8	83
Inky (police dog)	Inky	1969–70	1	N/A
Gay Hamilton	Dr. Jean Morrow/Watt	1970–1974	1–4, 6	12
Radar (police dog)	Radar	1970–72	2–3	N/A
Brian Hall	PC Ted Drake	1971–1972	3	16
Martin C. Thurley	PC Knowles *	1972–1974	4–5	23
Grahame Mallard	PC Terry Nesbitt	1972–1974	4–6	29
Nigel Humphreys	PC Pete Dodds	1974–1975	6–7	20
Malcolm Rennie	PC Ted Perry	1975	7	12
Philippa Howell	WPC Betty Arthur	1975–1976	7–8	12
Peter Clough	PC Joe Lincoln	1975–1976	7–8	17
Peter Childs	DS Don Grant	1976	8	15
John Flanagan	PC Will Pearson	1976	8	15

Others

Actor	Character	Years active	Series active	Episode count
Terrence Hardiman	Insp. Thomas Armstrong	1971	2	7
Peter Sallis	Lodge, Professor Dowell, Edward Letheridge	1971-1976	2, 7, 8	3
Julie Hallam	P/W DC Maggie Forest	1971–1972	2	9
Heather Stoney	P/W DS Mary Green	1971–1973	2-3	9
Jenny Hanley	Sara Jameson/Hawkins	1972–1975	4–7	8
John Franklyn-Robbins	CI/D Sup. Bill Adler	1972–1973	4	9
Warren Clarke	DS Jack Stirling	1973	5	4

* PC Knowles is never given a first name on-screen.

== Archive status ==
All but one episode of Task Force survive in the BBC Archives in their original format (either 2" Quad VT or 16 mm colour film, depending on the episode). The one exception is 1972's "Welcome to the Club", which only survives as a black and white copy of the originally colour episode. This one black and white episode survives on 16 mm film.

== Reception ==
=== Critical response ===
Laurence Marcus of Television Heaven described the series as a "well-executed police procedural", that successfully carried forward the legacy of Z-Cars and its first spin-off.

Jo Bayne of the Western Daily Press called it "one of the best police dramas on the box" and said that it was rarely violent for the sake of dramatic effect.

Jon E. Lewis and Penny Stempel described Softly, Softly and Softly, Softly: Task Force as a "successful" top‑ten spin‑off that always delivered "quality scripts", while noting that Barlow's departure left a "disconcerting black hole" at the heart of the series.

== DVD release ==
Series 1 received a Region 2 DVD release from Simply Media. This was released on 18 November 2013.

Simply Media released Series 2 on Region 2 DVD on 26 September 2016.

== Series development ==
Barlow and Watt appeared again in a six-part series in 1973, which saw the characters re-appraising the Jack the Ripper murders. The pair would state all the known facts and with the aid of specially staged reconstructions, attempt to work out how the crimes were committed, though usually nothing new was conclusively proven.

They were spun off into one further outing, Second Verdict. Over six weeks, they re-investigated some of the most baffling historic criminal cases, including the Lindbergh kidnapping and the murders of the Princes in the Tower by King Richard III. The characters sparred off each other to get to the truth made for entertaining television, but with the exception of the final episode, it was hampered by a lack of actual evidence to offer real 'second verdicts'. A comparable ITV series Killers featuring detailed reconstructions of notorious crime trials used much dialogue based on actual transcripts, which at the time did not help Second Verdict. In a contemporary interview, Stratford Johns remarked that: "I did not like the title. It was too limiting. I would have preferred 'Second Opinion'".

The character of John Watt would see one final solo appearance in the last ever Z-Cars, in September 1978.

== Book ==
In 1973 a tie-in book based on the series titled Softly Softly Murder Casebook, was also released. It was written by Arnold Yarrow and Robert Barr, and published by Pan Books.
