= Arnold Yarrow =

British actor, screenwriter and novelist (1920–2024)

- Born: Arnold Stein; 17 April 1920; London, England
- Died: 9 December 2024 (aged 104); Herne Bay, Kent, England
- Occupations: Actor; screenwriter; novelist
- Years active: 1948–1994 • 2012
- Known for: EastEnders; Doctor Who
- Height: 1.60 m (5 ft 3 in)

Arnold Yarrow (born Arnold Stein; 17 April 1920 – 9 December 2024) was a British actor, screenwriter and novelist best known for his brief role as bricklayer Benny Bloom in television soap opera EastEnders. Like the character, he was Jewish. Yarrow's other scriptwriting work included episodes of Crown Court, Warship and Softly, Softly: Task Force.

== Early life ==
Arnold Stein was born on 17 April 1920 in Mile End, London, to furrier father Jack Stein and mother Leah (née Montlake). His father died in 1928 and his mother subsequently married Philip Yarrow, a doctor. After the marriage, Arnold, along with his three brothers and sister, changed their surname to Yarrow. The family lived in East London, and after leaving school aged 14, Yarrow embarked on a career in advertising.

On the outbreak of the Second World War, he served as an infantryman and travelled to India and China, becoming an officer in the Royal Corps of Signals. After the war, Yarrow was posted to Germany, and became the administrator of a small theatre. He directed plays and ran the company as a weekly repertory.

== Career ==
Yarrow returned to the UK and enrolled at the Northern Theatre School in Bradford, West Yorkshire, under the direction of Esme Church. He became a professional actor in 1948. He worked with York repertory company and toured Shakespeare with the Dolphin theatre company. Yarrow then joined Bernard Miles' Mermaid theatre in London, in 1953. His roles included Adam in As You Like It and the Porter in Macbeth. In 1955, he spent a year working as an administrator and senior stage manager at the Library theatre, Manchester.

After a brief spell in Manchester, Yarrow moved back to London, winning Tavistock Rep's playwriting competition for his play Ripple in Texas. The production was professionally produced by Oldham Coliseum repertory theatre and later dramatised for the Home Service. In 1958, he made his West End debut with the Repertory Players at the Lyric, Shaftesbury Avenue, London.

In 1959, he won the ATV drama award, winning £500 and the broadcast of his play The Tip-Off, which was broadcast in 1960. In 1968, Yarrow became script editor for the series Softly, Softly. He then wrote episodes of Softly, Softly: Task Force from 1969 to 1976, Barlow at Large in 1971, and then Crown Court in 1974 and Warship in 1976 among others.

In front of the camera, Yarrow was also known to Doctor Who fans for his portrayal of diminutive Exxilon leader Bellal in the 1974 serial Death to the Daleks. He remains the longest lived person associated with the Whoniverse. In 1988, he appeared in EastEnders as Benny Bloom, a retired bricklayer and love interest to Ethel Skinner. Yarrow subsequently wrote ten episodes of the soap opera between 1992 and 1994.

His other television appearances included roles in Crane, Ghost Squad, Coronation Street, Dr. Finlay's Casebook, The Onedin Line and London's Burning, as well as a part in the 1993 film Son of the Pink Panther.

Yarrow also wrote radio plays including After Moscow in 1980 and His Master’s Voice in 1983. In 1984, he was part of a European tour of School for Scandal starring Donald Sinden and Dulcie Gray. For the remainder of the 1980s, Yarrow joined the Royal Shakespeare Company, taking parts such as Justice Shallow in The Merry Wives of Windsor to Verges in Much Ado About Nothing. In 1986, he performed a four-hour recital of all of Shakespeare’s sonnets to secure funding for his own play, Stitch, about an exploitative East End sweatshop.

As well as acting and scriptwriting, Yarrow wrote numerous books such as TV tie–ins like Softly Softly Casebook and Softly Softly Murder Casebook as well as his own novels Death is a Z and The Grease–Paint Monkey.

== Personal life and death ==
Yarrow had moved from London to Faversham, Kent by the 1980s. He was involved in the Marlowe theatre, Canterbury, and ran drama classes for the Workers’ Educational Association.

Yarrow subsequently moved to Herne Bay, Kent. He was Jewish. He turned 100 in April 2020, and died in Herne Bay on 9 December 2024, aged 104.

== Filmography ==
=== As story editor ===
Year	Title	Notes
1976	Second Verdict	6 episodes

=== As script editor ===
Year	Title	Notes
1968–1969	Softly Softly	37 episodes
1969–1971	Softly Softly: Task Force	42 episodes
1971	Barlow at Large	3 episodes

=== As writer ===
Year	Title	Notes
1960	Suspense	Season 1 Episode 1: "The Tip Off"
1962	Forræderiet	TV film
1970–1976	Softly Softly: Task Force	20 episodes
1973–1974	Barlow at Large	3 episodes
1974	Crown Court	3 episodes
1976	Warship	Season 3 Episode 10: "The Buccaneer"
1976	Second Verdict	Season 1 Episode 3: "The French Bluebeard"
1992–1994	EastEnders	10 episodes

=== As actor ===
==== Film ====
Year	Title	Role	Notes
1974	Mahler	Grandfather	
1993	Son of the Pink Panther	Uncle Idris	
1993	Genghis Cohn	Synagogue Warden	

==== Television ====
Year	Title	Role	Notes
1956	Without Vision	Emrys	TV film
1956	Nom–de–Plume	Sentry	Season 1 Episode 17: "The Free Air"
1956	Over to William	Mr. Carroway	Season 1 Episode 8: "William's Lucky Day"
1957	Television World Theatre	Le Fer	Season 1 Episode 1: "The Life of Henry V"
1957	ITV Television Playhouse	Shayk of the Labourers	Season 2 Episode 47: "Desert Patrol"
1958	Macbeth	First Witch	2 episodes
1958	Doomsday for Dyson	Scientist	TV film
1958	Dial 999	Sammy Wilson	Uncredited; Season 1 Episode 12: "The Big Fish"
1959	The Vise	Blake	Season 6 Episode 21: "Dilemma for Harry"
1959	Glencannon	Truck Driver	Season 1 Episode 13: "Crocodile Tears"
1959	ITV Play of the Week	M. Greville	Season 4 Episode 36: "The Age of Juliet"
1960	ITV Television Playhouse	Luigi Bonasera	Season 5 Episode 22: "The English Captain"
1960	Hotel Imperial	Little man	Season 2 Episode 8: "The Leopardess in 424"
1960	Man from Interpol	Mayli	Season 1 Episode 10: "The Doll Maker"
1960	The Roving Reasons	Unknown	Season 1 Episode 10: "The Gibbering Gibraltarian"
1960	The Haunted House	Misargyrides	Season 1 Episode 1: "Part 1"
1960	Barnaby Rudge	Tailor	Season 1 Episode 10
1960	Armchair Theatre	Bates	Season 4 Episode 15: "Rain"
1961	Armchair Theatre	Manager	Season 4 Episode 30: "The Hero"
1961	Colonel Trumper's Private War	Unknown	Season 1 Episode 1: "Operation Lubenski"
1962	The Andromeda Breakthrough	President of Azaran	3 episodes
1962	ITV Play of the Week	Bilton	Season 8 Episode 8: "Major Barbara"
1963	ITV Play of the Week	Luigi	Season 8 Episode 19: "Darkness at Noon"
1963	Ghost Squad	Dr. Malik	Season 2 Episode 5: "Death of a Sportsman"
1963	BBC Sunday–Night Play	Nikifor	Season 4 Episode 20: "The Fall of Mendel Krick"
1963	Crane	Louis Barreto	Season 1 Episode 4: "My Deadly Friend"
1963	Festival	Doctor of Philosophy	Season 1 Episode 9: "The Fire Raisers"
1963	Boyd Q.C.	Unknown	Season 6 Episode 13: "Fishy Story"
1963	Story Box	Tram Conductor	Episode: "Emil and the Detectives"
1964	Story Box	Balin	Episode: "Books – The Hobbit"
1965	Front Page Story	Claude Dupuis	Season 1 Episode 14: "Background Only: Not for Publication"
1965	Coronation Street	Surveyor	Season 1 Episode 493
1965	For Whom the Bell Tolls	Miguel	Season 1 Episode 4: "The Bridge"
1966	The Man in the Mirror	Waldo	6 episodes
1967	Vacant Lot	Unknown	Season 1 Episode 7: "Criminal Negligence"
1967	Theatre 625	Stevo	Season 5 Episode 6: "The Single Passion"
1968	Dr. Finlay's Casebook	The Pope	Season 6 Episode 22: " 'Is there anybody there ?' Said the traveller"
1968	Life with Cooper	Various Roles	Season 2 Episode 6: "The Second Holiday"
1968	The Revenue Men	Louie Fisher	Season 1 Episode 4: "I'd Rather Be in Philadelphia"
1969	Armchair Theatre	Enrico	Season 9 Episode 3: "What's a mother for ?"
1974	Doctor Who	Bellal	3 episodes; serial: Death to the Daleks
1980	The Onedin Line	Mishin	Season 8 Episode 2: "Revenge"
1980	Wainwrights' Law	Inspector	Season 1 Episode 6: "The Party of the First Part"
1980	A Little Silver Trumpet	Mr. Hynes	Season 1 Episode 3
1982	The Chinese Detective	Old man	Season 2 Episode 5: "Bounty Hunter"
1983	Jemima Shore Investigates	Dr. Otto Hahn	Season 1 Episode 5: "Dr. Ziegler's Casebook"
1984	Cold Warrior	Graarud	Season 1 Episode 5: "The Immigrants"
1987	One by One	Dr. Breen	Season 3 Episode 5: "The Monkey in Between"
1988–1989	EastEnders	Mr. Bloom	16 episodes
1989	EastEnders	Benny	Season 1 Episode 413
1993	London's Burning	Shopkeeper	Season 6 Episode 5
2010	The Sarah Jane Adventures	Bellal	Uncredited; archive footage; Series 4 Episode 6: "Death of the Doctor: Part Two"
2012	Beneath the City of the Exxilons	Himself	Short documentary
