= Z-Cars =

British police TV series, 1962–1978

- Created by: Troy Kennedy Martin; Allan Prior
- Starring: James Ellis; Brian Blessed; Stratford Johns; Frank Windsor; Jeremy Kemp; Joseph Brady; Colin Welland
- Country of origin: United Kingdom
- Original language: English
- No. of series: 12
- No. of episodes: 801 (462 missing) (list of episodes)

Production
- Running time: 25 minutes & 45 minutes

Original release
- Network: BBC1
- Release: 2 January 1962 – 20 September 1978

Related
- Softly, Softly; Softly, Softly: Task Force; Barlow at Large/Barlow; Jack the Ripper; Second Verdict

Z-Cars or Z Cars (pronounced "zed cars") is a British television police procedural series centred on the work of mobile uniformed police and CID detectives in the fictional town of Newtown, based on Kirkby, near Liverpool. Produced by the BBC, it debuted in January 1962 and ran until September 1978.

Z-Cars ran for 801 episodes, of which fewer than half have survived. Regular stars included Stratford Johns (Detective Inspector Barlow), Frank Windsor (Det. Sgt. Watt), James Ellis (Bert Lynch), and Brian Blessed ("Fancy" Smith). Barlow and Watt were later spun into a separate series Softly, Softly.

== Origin of the title ==
The title comes from the radio call signs allocated by Lancashire Constabulary. Lancashire police divisions were lettered from north to the south: "A" Division (based in Ulverston) was the detached part of Lancashire at the time around Barrow-in-Furness, "B" Division was Lancaster, and so on (see Home Office radio). The TV series took the non-existent signs Z-Victor 1 and Z-Victor 2. The title does not, as sometimes suggested, come from the cars used, Ford Zephyr and Ford Zodiac. The Zephyr was the standard traffic patrol car used by Lancashire and other police forces, while the Zodiac was only used for specialist tasks such as traffic duty. Also, the term "Z-car" was used commonly by British newspapers to refer to any type of police vehicle.

== Concept and principal characters ==
Z Cars as an idea came to creator Troy Kennedy Martin as he listened to police messages on his radio while trying to relieve the boredom of being ill in bed with mumps. It was set in the fictional Newtown, loosely based on the real-life modern suburb of Kirkby, one of many housing estates that had sprung up across Britain in the post-war years, and its ageing neighbour Seaport.

The stories revolve around pairs of officers patrolling that week. Riding on changing social attitudes and television, the social realism, with interesting stories, garnered popularity for Z Cars. It was initially somewhat unpopular with real-life police, who disliked the sometimes unsympathetic characterisation of officers. Being set in Northern England helped give Z Cars a regional flavour when most BBC dramas were set in Southern England. It directly challenged the BBC's established police drama Dixon of Dock Green, which at that point had been running for seven years but which some considered 'cosy'.

The one character present throughout the entire run (though not in every episode) was Bert Lynch, played by James Ellis (though John Phillips as Det. Chief Supt. Robins reappeared sporadically during the show's run – by the end of the series he had become Chief Constable). Other characters in the early days were Stratford Johns (Det. Chief Inspector Barlow), Frank Windsor (Det. Sgt. Watt), Robert Keegan (Sgt. Blackitt), Joseph Brady (PC "Jock" Weir), Brian Blessed ("Fancy" Smith) and Jeremy Kemp (Bob Steele). Also in 1960s episodes as David Graham was Colin Welland, later a screenwriter. Other British actors who played regular roles in the early years included Joss Ackland. Although he played no regular role in the series, future Monkee Davy Jones appeared in three separate episodes (in 1962), and 1963 saw two future well-known faces join the regulars – Leonard Rossiter played DI Bamber in eight episodes, and John Thaw, later known for his roles in The Sweeney and Inspector Morse, appeared in four as a detective constable who had to leave the force because he had a "glass head" – he could not drink alcohol when socialising and mixing with the criminal fraternity, very much part of a detective's job.

== Episodes ==
Z-Cars ran for 801 episodes.

The original run ended in 1965; Barlow, Watt and Blackitt were spun off into a new series Softly, Softly. When the BBC was looking for a twice-weekly show to replace a series of failed 'soaps' (one example being United!), Z Cars was revived. The revival was produced by the BBC's serials department in a twice-weekly soap opera format of 25-minute episodes, and only James Ellis and Joseph Brady remained from the original show's run. It was shown from March 1967, both 25-minute segments each week comprising one story.

It ran like this until the episode "Kid's Stuff" (broadcast on 30 March 1971), shown as a single 50-minute episode for the week, proved the longer format would still work. Thereafter, Z Cars was shown in alternating spells of either two × 25-minute episodes or the single 50-minute episode each week over the next 16 months. This arrangement ended with the showing of the final two-parter, "Breakage" (Series 6, parts 74 and 75, on 21 and 22 August 1972 respectively), after which the series returned permanently to a regular pattern of one 50-minute episode per week.

=== Lost episodes ===
Like many series of its era, Z-Cars is incomplete in the archives. The period 1962–65 is reasonably well represented; though with big gaps. With the 1967–71 sixth series, when the programme was shown almost every week, material becomes more patchy still. Of the 416 episodes made for this series, only 108 survive: a few episodes each from 1967, 1969, and 1970, but there are no surviving episodes from 1968 or 1971. About 40% of the total 801 episodes are preserved.

The original series was one of the last British television dramas to be screened as a live production. With videotaping becoming the norm and telerecording a mature method of preserving broadcasts, the practice of live broadcasting drama productions was rare by the time the programme began in 1962. Going out "live" was a preference of the series' producer David Rose, who felt it helped immediacy and pace and gave it an edge. As a result, episodes were still not being pre-recorded as late as 1965. Most were videotaped for a potential repeat, although the tapes – costed as part of a programme's budget – were normally wiped for re-use. The transfer of a live or videotaped programme to film greatly enhanced its chances of surviving.

In the 1980s, the telerecording of the pilot episode "Four of a Kind" was returned to its writer Allan Prior by an engineer. He had taken it home to preserve it because his children had enjoyed the programme and as a result he could not bring himself to destroy it. This and two other early editions were released on a BBC Video in 1993. Two further episodes were returned in 2004 after turning up in a private collection; there have been other occasional returns of individual early episodes in more recent years.

The return of the 50-minute format into regular use coincided with an increase in the survival rate, and all episodes from the 1975–1978 period are preserved in the archives. BBC Archive Treasure Hunt was a drive to seek out missing episodes and is still open to information regarding missing editions of lost BBC television programmes. British vintage television enthusiast organisation Kaleidoscope is also interested in the recovery of lost television shows, regardless of their original maker or broadcaster.

== Theme music ==
The Z-Cars theme tune was arranged by Fritz Spiegl and his then wife, composer Bridget Fry, from the traditional Liverpool folk song "Johnny Todd". It was released on record in several versions in 1962. Johnny Keating's version (Piccadilly Records, 7N.35032) sold the best, reaching No. 8 on the Record Retailer chart and as high as No. 5 on some UK charts, while the Norrie Paramor Orchestra's version, on Columbia DB 4789, peaked at No. 33. A vocal version of the theme, using the original ballad's words, was released by cast member James Ellis on Philips Records PB 1230; this missed the charts.

The song in Spiegl and Fry's arrangement is used as an anthem by English football clubs Everton and Watford, playing as the teams enter the pitch for their home games, at Hill Dickinson Stadium and Vicarage Road respectively. It is also used for similar purposes at the Borough Park home of Workington A.F.C.

The tune has also been used as music for the hymn "Father, Hear the Prayer We Offer".

== After Z-Cars ==
Softly, Softly, a 1965 spin-off, focused on the regional crime squad, and ran until 1969, when it was again revised and became Softly, Softly: Task Force, running until 1976. The character of Barlow (Stratford Johns) was one of the best-known figures in British television in the 1960s and 1970s. He was given four seasons of his own solo series, Barlow at Large (later Barlow) which ran from 1971 to 1975. Barlow joined Watt (Frank Windsor) for the 1973 serial Jack the Ripper. The serial's success led to a further spin-off titled Second Verdict in which Barlow and Watt looked into unsolved cases and unsafe convictions.

Windsor made a final appearance as Watt in the last episode of Z-Cars, "Pressure", in September 1978, with Robins (John Phillips), the detective chief superintendent from the original series who had risen to chief constable. Jeremy Kemp, Brian Blessed, Joseph Brady and Colin Welland also appeared, though not as their original characters.

In 1976, John Swindells joined the cast of the Canadian police drama Sidestreet as Ted Bowman, the same character he had previously played in Z-Cars earlier in the decade.

== Recognition ==
In a 2000 poll to find the 100 Greatest British Television Programmes of the 20th century conducted by the British Film Institute, Z-Cars was voted 63rd. It was also included in television critic Alison Graham's alphabetical list of 40 "all-time great" TV shows published in Radio Times in August 2003.

== Cast ==
=== Main cast ===
(1962–1965 and 1967–1978: 12 series, 801 episodes)

Character	Portrayed by	Years active	Series active	Episode count
DCI Charlie Barlow	Stratford Johns	1962–1965	1–5	126
DS John Watt	Frank Windsor	1962–1965, 1978	1–5, 12	130
PC John "Jock" Weir	Joseph Brady	1962–1965, 1967, 1978	1–6	165
PC / DC / Sgt. / Insp. Bert Lynch	James Ellis	1962-1965, 1967-1978	1–12	629
PC William "Fancy" Smith	Brian Blessed	1962–1965	1–5	113
PC Bob Steele	Jeremy Kemp	1962–1963	1–2	34
Sgt. Percy Twentyman	Leonard Williams	1962	1–2	30
PC Ian Sweet	Terence Edmond	1962–1964	1–3	78
DC Glyn Hicks	Michael Forrest	1962–1964	2–3	36
PC David Graham	Colin Welland	1962–1965	2–5	85
Sgt. Bob Blackitt	Robert Keegan	1962–1965	2–5	108
PC Ken Baker	Geoffrey Whitehead	1964–1965	4	29
PC Taylor	Marcus Hammond	1964–1965	4	20
Paula Poulton (BD Girl) (Note: Radio operator, using Lancashire Police's call-sign BD)	Sara Aimson	1965	4–5	23
PC Ray Walker	Donald Gee	1965	4–5	18
DI / DCI Sam Hudson	John Barrie	1967, 1968	6	32
DS Tom Stone	John Slater	1967–1974	6–9	431
PC Owen Culshaw	David Daker	1967–1968	6	82
PC Steve Tate	Sebastian Breaks	1967	6	34
PC Alec May	Stephen Yardley	1967–1968	6	68
WPC Susan Parkin	Pauline Taylor	1967–1969	6	58
PC Bill Newcombe	Bernard Holley	1967–1971	6	292
BD Girl (name N/A)	Jennie Goossens	1967–1971	6–7	146
DI Todd	Joss Ackland	1967–1968	6	40
PC Jackson	John Wreford	1967–1968	6	32
DI Alan Witty	John Woodvine	1968–1969	6	62
PC Doug Roach	Ron Davies	1968–1969	6	60
PC Bruce Bannerman	Paul Angelis	1968–1969	6	128
PC / Sgt. Alec Quilley	Douglas Fielding	1969–1978	6–12	345
DI / Mr. Neil Goss	Derek Waring	1969–1973	6–8	226
PC / DC Joe Skinner	Ian Cullen	1969–1975	6–9	226
PC Reg Horrocks	Barry Lowe	1970–1975, 1977	6–9, 11	29
PC / Sgt. Ted Bowman	John Swindells	1970–1973	6–7	40
DS Cecil Haggar	John Collin	1971–1976, 1978	6–7, 9–10,12	51
DC Dave Scatliff	Geoffrey Hayes	1971–1974	6–8	27
PC Shaun Covill	Jack Carr	1971–1972	6–7	39
PC Fred Render	Allan O'Keefe	1971–1978	6–12	65
DS / DI Terry Moffat	Ray Lonnen	1972–1977	7–11	25
DS Wilf Miller	Geoffrey Whitehead	1972–1975	6–9	22
DC Jim Braithwaite	David Jackson	1972–1978	7–12	22
Sgt. Gilbert Chubb	Paul Stewart	1974–1978	9–12	25
DC / DS Bernard Bowker	Brian Grellis	1974–1978	9–12	19

=== Recurring cast ===
Character	Portrayed by	Years active	Series active	Episode count
Janey Steele	Dorothy White	1962–1963	1–2	14
Sgt./ Insp. Barnes	Frank Hawkins	1962–1963	N/A	20
DCS / ACC / Chief Con. Robins	John Phillips	1962–1965, 1967, 1969, 1973, 1978	Series 1–4, 6–7, 12	14
Katy Hoskins (BD Girl)	Virginia Stride	1962–1964	1–3	18
WPC Jenny Stacey	Lynn Furlong	1962–1965	1–4	24
DC Bob "Lofty" Smithers – Police Photographer	Ken Jones	1962–64	1–3	8
DI / Supt. Jim Dunn	Dudley Foster	1962, 1964	1, 3	13
DCS Miller	Leslie Sands	1962–63, 1965, 1967, 1969	Series 1–4, 6	12
Sally Clarkson (BD Girl)	Diane Aubrey	1962	1–2	24
Sgt. Michaelson	James Cossins	1962–1963	2	11
Joan Longton (BD Girl)	Hilary Martyn	1962–1963	2	13
DI Bamber	Leonard Rossiter	1963	2	8
Betty Clayton (BD Girl)	Sidonie Bond	1963	2	16
DC Terry Elliot	John Thaw	1963	3	4
Seaton, Williams	Peter Sallis	1963–1964	3–4	2
Shirley Burscough (BD Girl)	Kate Brown	1963	3	16
Mr. Healey, Mr. Brooke, McKinley, Mr. Blacker, Timmy Cater, Dicky Green, Thurley, Byrne, Det. Supt. Ramsden	Derek Benfield	1963–1978	3–4, 6–7, 13	12
Pamela Earnshaw (BD Girl)	Kate Allitt	1964	3	12
Ann Fazakerley (BD Girl)	Lynn Farleigh	1964	3–4	17
WPC Nelson	Susan Jameson	1965, 1975	Series 4,9	6
PC Bob Foster	Donald Webster	1965	4	8
WPC Jane Shepherd	Luanshya Greer	1967	6	6
BD Girl (name N/A)	Anjula Harman	1967, 1969	6	15
DC Kane	Christopher Coll	1967–1968	6	20
Betty Culshaw	Doreen Aris	1967–1968	6	8
DI Brogan	George Sewell	1967	6	6
Sally Stone	Thelma Whiteley	1967, 1969–1970	6	8
Sgt. Potter	Victor Brooks	1968–1969	6	10
D Supt. Oakley	William Dexter	1968–1971	6	6
PC Stack	John Livesey	1969	6	13
WPC/WP Sgt. Lorna Cameron	June Watson	1970, 1973–1975	6, 8–9	8
Supt./D Supt. Roy Richards	Jerome Willis	1971–1973	6–7	4
WPC Anne Howarth	Stephanie Turner	1971–1975	7–9	15
PC Lindsay	James Walsh	1971–1974	7–9	10
Sgt. Frank Culshaw	John Challis	1972–1975	7–9	13
DI Fred Connor	Gary Watson	1972–1974	7–8	11
PC Jeff Yates	Nicholas Smith	1972–1975	7–9	9
Insp./ CI Logie	Kenton Moore	1972–1974	7–8	4
DI Gerry Madden	Tommy Boyle	1978	12	8
WPC Jane Beck	Victoria Plucknett	1978	12	3

== See also ==
- Z-car (disambiguation)
