= List of Softly, Softly: Task Force episodes =

This is an episode list for the British television series Softly, Softly: Task Force. The series aired on BBC1 between 1969 and 1976. Unlike its predecessor Softly, Softly, all 149 episodes have survived although series 4, episode 11, "Welcome to the Club" exists as a black and white telerecording when it was originally recorded on 2" colour videotape.

== Series overview ==
Series	Episodes	Originally released	
Series	Episodes	First released	Last released
1	16	20 November 1969	12 March 1970
2	26	16 September 1970	10 March 1971
3	26	6 October 1971	29 March 1972
4	20	13 September 1972	31 January 1973
5	18	12 September 1973	16 January 1974
6	13	4 September 1974	27 November 1974
7	15	27 August 1975	3 December 1975
8	15	8 September 1976	15 December 1976

== Series 1 (1969–70) ==
No. Overall	No. In Series	Original air date (UK)	Episode title
1	1	20 November 1969	Arrival
2	2	27 November 1969	Exercise
3	3	4 December 1969	Diversion
4	4	11 December 1969	The Spoilt Ones
5	5	18 December 1969	To Protect the Innocent…
6	6	1 January 1970	Any Other Night
7	7	8 January 1970	The Aggro Boy
8	8	15 January 1970	Standing Orders
9	9	22 January 1970	Private Mischief
10	10	29 January 1970	Open and Shut
11	11	5 February 1970	Sprats and Mackerels
12	12	12 February 1970	Like Any Other Friday…
13	13	19 February 1979	Power of the Press
14	14	26 February 1970	Trust a Woman
15	15	5 March 1970	The Hermit
16	16	12 March 1970	Escort

== Series 2 (1970–71) ==
No. Overall	No. In Series	Original air date (UK)	Episode title
17	1	16 September 1970	Baptism
18	2	23 September 1970	Sunday, Sweet Sunday
19	3	30 September 1970	Safe in the Streets?
20	4	7 October 1970	Good Listener
21	5	14 October 1970	Time Expired
22	6	21 October 1970	Lessons
23	7	28 October 1970	Without Favour
24	8	4 November 1970	Never Hit a Lady
25	9	11 November 1970	It's Ugly Head
26	10	18 November 1970	Who Wants Pride…?
27	11	25 November 1970	Collation
28	12	2 December 1970	Do Me a Favour
29	13	9 December 1970	Sweet Are the Uses of Adversity
30	14	16 December 1970	Bearings
31	15	23 December 1970	A World Full of Rooms
32	16	30 December 1970	The Lie Direct
33	17	6 January 1971	Ground Level
34	18	13 January 1971	Company Business
35	19	20 January 1971	Kick Off
36	20	27 January 1971	Final Score
37	21	3 February 1971	Something Big
38	22	10 February 1971	Games
39	23	17 February 1971	In the Public Gaze
40	24	24 February 1971	Held for Questioning
41	25	3 March 1971	Black Equals White
42	26	10 March 1971	Cash and Carry

== Series 3 (1971–72) ==
No. Overall	No. In Series	Original air date (UK)	Episode title
43	1	6 October 1971	Once Bitten
44	2	13 October 1971	Hostage
45	3	20 October 1971	The Floater
46	4	27 October 1971	Aberration
47	5	3 November 1971	Moving On
48	6	10 November 1971	An Inside Job
49	7	17 November 1971	The Bounty Hunter
50	8	24 November 1971	Marksman
51	9	1 December 1971	Copper Wire
52	10	8 December 1971	Man of Peace
53	11	15 December 1971	Good Touches
54	12	22 December 1971	Better Than Doing Porridge
55	13	29 December 1971	The Removal
56	14	5 January 1972	Priorities
57	15	12 January 1972	Resolution
58	16	19 January 1972	The Amateur
59	17	26 January 1972	Anywhere in the Wild World
60	18	2 February 1972	Flight
61	19	9 February 1972	The Big Tip-Off
62	20	16 February 1972	Woman's World
63	21	23 February 1972	A Policeman's Lot: Part 1: The Row on the Stairs
64	22	1 March 1972	A Policeman's Lot: Part 2: You Pays Your Money
65	23	8 March 1972	A Policeman's Lot: Part 3: It Depends Where You're Standing
66	24	15 March 1972	Set Us Alight
67	25	22 March 1972	The Easy Job
68	26	29 March 1972	Conclusion

== Series 4 (1972–73) ==
No. Overall	No. In Series	Original air date (UK)	Episode title
69	1	13 September 1972	Spit and Polish
70	2	20 September 1972	Killer
71	3	27 September 1972	Surveillance
72	4	4 October 1972	Dog Eat Dog
73	5	11 October 1972	Bank Rate
74	6	18 October 1972	On the Third Day
75	7	25 October 1972	The Witness
76	8	1 November 1972	Run for Your Money
77	9	8 November 1972	New Broom
78	10	15 November 1972	Paper Chase
79	11	22 November 1972	Welcome to the Club
80	12	29 November 1972	Justice
81	13	6 December 1972	Conversion
82	14	13 December 1972	Needle
83	15	20 December 1972	Execution
84	16	3 January 1973	Time-Table
85	17	10 January 1973	Conspiracy
86	18	17 January 1973	Money for Sale
87	19	24 January 1973	For Love or Money
88	20	31 January 1973	Little Acorns

== Series 5 (1973–74) ==
No. Overall	No. In Series	Original air date (UK)	Episode title
89	1	12 September 1973	Errors
90	2	19 September 1973	Signed Off
91	3	26 September 1973	A Quiet Man
92	4	3 October 1973	No Way
93	5	10 October 1973	No Life for a Woman
94	6	17 October 1973	Twenty-Seven Pieces of Porcelain
95	7	24 October 1973	Night-Watch
96	8	31 October 1973	Catch as Catch Can
97	9	7 November 1973	The Loudmouth
98	10	14 November 1973	Interrogation
99	11	21 November 1973	Slip of the Tongue
100	12	28 November 1973	Trial
101	13	5 December 1973	Skipper's Walk
102	14	12 December 1973	Cover
103	15	19 December 1973	Observation
104	16	2 January 1974	Trouble-Maker
105	17	9 January 1974	The Raider
106	18	16 January 1974	Victim

== Series 6 (1974) ==
No. Overall	No. In Series	Original air date (UK)	Episode title
107	1	4 September 1974	Alert
108	2	11 September 1974	You Don't Have to Shout, I'm Leaving
109	3	18 September 1974	Worth a Million
110	4	25 September 1974	Domestic Incident
111	5	2 October 1974	Pop Goes the Weasel
112	6	9 October 1974	Cat Among the Pigeons
113	7	16 October 1974	Pardon
114	8	23 October 1974	Little Boy Blue
115	9	30 October 1974	A Day's Work
116	10	6 November 1974	Paperwork
117	11	13 November 1974	See What You've Done
118	12	20 November 1974	We're in This Together
119	13	27 November 1974	Temptation

== Series 7 (1975) ==
No. Overall	No. In Series	Original air date (UK)	Episode title
120	1	27 August 1975	Feedback
121	2	3 September 1975	High Life
122	3	10 September 1975	Protection
123	4	17 September 1975	Grass
124	5	24 September 1975	Bargains
125	6	1 October 1975	The Talking Doll
126	7	8 October 1975	And with What Measure?
127	8	15 October 1975	Female of the Species
128	9	22 October 1975	A Person Unknown
129	10	29 October 1975	Homicide
130	11	5 November 1975	Dorothy's Birthday
131	12	12 November 1975	Whose Side Are You On?
132	13	19 November 1975	Choirboy
133	14	26 November 1975	On Call
134	15	3 December 1975	Blind Alley

== Series 8 (1976) ==
No. Overall	No. In Series	Original air date (UK)	Episode title
135	1	8 September 1976	Not with a Bang…
136	2	15 September 1976	There's Always Tomorrow
137	3	22 September 1976	Say It with Flowers
138	4	29 September 1976	The Trojan Horse
139	5	6 October 1976	Now You See It, Now You Don't
140	6	13 October 1976	As Good Cooks Go…
141	7	20 October 1976	The Visitor
142	8	27 October 1976	Baked Beans
143	9	3 November 1976	The Climber
144	10	10 November 1976	At Risk
145	11	17 November 1976	Got Him!
146	12	24 November 1976	Just a Whisper?
147	13	1 December 1976	A Shot in the Dark
148	14	8 December 1976	Communication
149	15	15 December 1976	Alarums and Excursions
