= David Lloyd Meredith =

English actor (1933–2008)

- Born: 30 October 1933; London, England, UK
- Died: 22 October 2008 (aged 74); Chester, Cheshire, England, UK
- Occupation: Actor
- Spouse: Daphne Lloyd Meredith

David Lloyd Meredith (30 October 1933 – 22 October 2008) was an English actor. He came from a Welsh family background, but was born in London.

His best known role was as uniform Sergeant, then Detective Sergeant (finally Detective Inspector) Bob Evans in Softly, Softly: Task Force for its entire run from 1969 to 1976, although he only appears in one episode of the final series having been pensioned off following injury in the previous years finale. He also played small roles in films such as That Summer!, Henry V and The Englishman Who Went Up a Hill But Came Down a Mountain.

He also trained and worked as an osteopath.

== Filmography ==
Year	Title	Role	Notes
1979	That Summer!	Beachfloat Man	
1979	The Famous Five	Red Tower	Episode: Five Fall Into Adventure
1989	Henry V	Governor of Harfleur	
1995	The Englishman Who Went Up a Hill But Came Down a Mountain	Jones the JP	(final film role)
