= Stratford Johns =

British actor (1925–2002)

- Born: Alan Edgar Stratford Johnson; 22 September 1925; Pietermaritzburg, Union of South Africa
- Died: 29 January 2002 (aged 76); Heveningham, Suffolk, England
- Occupation: Actor
- Years active: 1955–1998
- Known for: Z-Cars
- Notable work: Doctor Who: Four to Doomsday; The Lair of the White Worm
- Spouse: Nanette Ryder (m. 1955)
- Children: 4

Alan Edgar Stratford Johnson (22 September 1925 – 29 January 2002) known as Stratford Johns, was a South African-born British stage, film and television actor known for playing the role of senior CID officer Charlie Barlow, a character he originated in the long-running BBC police series Z-Cars, and continued to play in several spin-off series in the 1960s and 1970s.

== Early life ==
Johns was born and grew up in Pietermaritzburg, South Africa. After serving as a deckhand in the South African Navy during World War II, he worked for a time in accountancy before becoming involved in amateur theatre.

== Career ==
In 1948, Johns bought a one-way ticket to Britain and learned his craft working in repertory theatre at Southend-on-Sea for almost five years. He began to appear in British films from the mid-1950s, including a bit part in the classic Ealing comedy The Ladykillers (1955). He ran a small hotel in London during the 1950s, and was a member of the English Stage Company at the Royal Court Theatre during the Angry Young Men period when new playwrights, including John Osborne, introduced new themes to British theatre. His most famous character, Barlow, was noted for his hard edges, owing much to the changes in characterisation pioneered at the Royal Court.

In 1961, he appeared in The Avengers Season One episode "The Frighteners" in the role of Sir Thomas Weller. In 1968 he was in the spy-fi series Department S in the first filmed episode "The Man in the Elegant Room."

In 1962, he was cast in the role of Barlow in Z-Cars . During the run (1962–1978) of Z-Cars, he transferred his character to the spin-off series, Softly, Softly (1966–1969), and later Softly, Softly: Task Force (1969–1972). He also played the voice of the mysterious "Guvnor" in The Great St Trinian's Train Robbery (1966).

He was the subject of This Is Your Life in October 1963 when he was surprised by Eamonn Andrews at BBC Television Centre.

In the 1970s, he starred in a third spin-off series, Barlow at Large (1971, 1973), which saw the character transferred to British Intelligence: it was later retitled simply Barlow (1974–1975). Although the Barlow character remained popular (and appeared in another spin-off, in which he investigated the Jack the Ripper murders), ratings for these solo spin-offs declined, and the final series ended in 1975. Barlow was seen once more in 1976, in the series Second Verdict.

Johns appeared as President of the Council Bradshaw in the 1970 award-winning film Cromwell with Richard Harris in the role of Cromwell and Sir Alec Guinness as King Charles I.

In 1973, Johns was named BBC TV Personality of the Year by the Variety Club of Great Britain. He portrayed the apartheid-supporting Namib mine superintendent Mr. Zimmerman in two episodes of the 1985 mini-series Master of the Game.

Johns later appeared in the Ken Russell films Salome's Last Dance and The Lair of the White Worm (both 1988), followed by the mid-1980s Channel 4 series Brond, in which he played the title character.

His many stage credits include Daddy Warbucks in the original West End run of Annie – he can be heard on the original London cast album – and the Ghost of Christmas Present in the original Birmingham cast of the stage adaptation of the film musical Scrooge (1970), on the recording of which he can also be heard. His guest appearances on TV include The Avengers, Department S, Neverwhere, the Doctor Who serial Four to Doomsday (1982) and the Blake's 7 episode "Games". He had a prominent role as Calpurnius Piso in the BBC's acclaimed adaptation of Robert Graves' I, Claudius (1976); he played Magwitch in the BBC's 1981 adaptation of Dickens' Great Expectations, and the jailer in The Jail Diary of Albie Sachs. Johns appeared in the 1984 pop video for Young at Heart recorded by The Bluebells. With him were veteran Scottish actress Molly Weir and Scots singer/actress Clare Grogan. In 1993, Johns appeared in the BBC period drama Scarlet and Black alongside a young Ewan McGregor and Rachel Weisz.

Johns played the role of Cyril Isaiah Greengrass, the conniving brother of Claude Jeremiah Greengrass in the nostalgic Yorkshire Television series, Heartbeat.

He was also the author of the children's book Gumphlumph; in the mid-1960s, at the height of his fame as Barlow, he read it on the children's television series Jackanory. Gumphlumph would be revived, again with Johns narrating, for the TV-am children's programme Rub-a-Dub-Tub in the 1980s.

== Personal life ==
He married Nanette Ryder in 1955; they had four children. He ran the small hotel in St Martins Lane called the St Martins Hotel; it was managed by Elizabeth Kissick-Jones, formerly Hartnell, who was the aunt of his wife Nanette. The hotel was popular with actors and he ran it until 1976.

After several years of poor health, Johns died from heart disease in 2002, aged 76.

== Selected filmography ==
=== Film ===
- Burnt Evidence (1954) - 2nd Fireman (uncredited)
- The Night My Number Came Up (1955) - Sergeant (uncredited)
- The Ship That Died of Shame (1955) - Garage Worker (uncredited)
- The Ladykillers (1955) - Security Guard (uncredited)
- Who Done It? (1956) - P.C. Coleman
- Women Without Men (1956) - 1st Reveller (uncredited)
- The Long Arm (1956) - Constable (uncredited)
- Tiger in the Smoke (1956) - Police Constable
- Across the Bridge (1957) - Detective in Schaffner's Office (uncredited)
- The One That Got Away (1957) - Second Detective (uncredited)
- Violent Playground (1958) - (uncredited)
- Indiscreet (1958) - Waiter (uncredited)
- Law and Disorder (1958) - Driver of Prison Van (uncredited)
- A Night to Remember (1958) - Crewman on Upturned Lifeboat (uncredited)
- The Professionals (1960) - Lawson
- Hand in Hand (1960)
- Two Letter Alibi (1962) - Bates
- The Great St Trinian's Train Robbery (1966) - The Voice/Guvnor (voice)
- Rocket to the Moon (1967) - Royal Engineer Sergeant
- The Plank (1967) - Warrant Officer
- Cromwell (1970) - President Bradshaw
- The Strange Case of the End of Civilization as We Know It (1977) - Chief Commissioner Blocker
- The Fiendish Plot of Dr. Fu Manchu (1980) - Ismail
- George and Mildred (1980) - Harry Pinto
- Dance with a Stranger (1985) - Morrie Conley
- Wild Geese II (1985) - Mustapha El Ali
- Car Trouble (1986) - Reg Sampson
- Foreign Body (1986) - Mr. Plumb
- Salome's Last Dance (1988) - Herod / Alfred Taylor
- The Lair of the White Worm (1988) - Peters
- The Fool (1990) - Arthur Shillibeer
- Splitting Heirs (1993) - Butler

=== Television ===
- The Flying Doctor (1959) - Police Sergeant (episode "The Riddle")
- Probation Officer (1959-1960) - CID Sergeant / Mr. Cordner / Reverend Charles Clifford
- International Detective (1960) - The Registrar (episode "The Dennison Case")
- Interpol Calling (1960) - Inspector Chaubin (episode "A Foreign Body")
- Deadline Midnight (1960) - Dalkin
- Biggles (1960) - Warren (episode "Biggles Turns the Scale")
- No Wreath for the General (1960) - Beattie
- The Avengers (1961) - Sir Thomas Weller (episode "The Frighteners")
- Maigret (1961, 1962) - Keller (episodes "The Cactus" and "Murder on Monday")
- Z-Cars (1962–1965) - Barlow
- This Is Your Life (1963) - self
- Softly, Softly (1966–1969) - Barlow
- The Avengers (1968) - Mr. Street (episode "Legacy of Death")
- Department S (1968) - Paul Trenton (episode "The Man in the Elegant Room")
- Softly, Softly: Task Force (1969–1972) - Barlow
- Barlow at Large (1971, 1973) - Barlow
- Jack the Ripper - Barlow
- Barlow (1974–1975) - Barlow
- Second Verdict (1976) - Barlow
- I, Claudius (1976) - Calpurnius Piso
- Moynihan (1976) - (episode "The Going Rate")
- Great Expectations (1981) - Abel Magwitch
- The Jail Diary of Albie Sachs (1981) - Warrant Officer Snyman
- Blake's 7 (1981) - Belkov (episode "Games")
- Four to Doomsday (1982) - Monarch (Doctor Who serial in 4 episodes, part of series 19)
- Master of the Game (1984) - Zimmerman
- Brond (1987) - Brond
- The Secret Agent (1992) - The Home Secretary
- Scarlet and Black (1993) - Abbé Pirard
- Minder (1994) - Knowles (episode "Bring Me the Head of Arthur Daley")
- Neverwhere (1996) - Mr. Stockton (episode "Earl's Court to Islington")
- Heartbeat (1998) - Cyril Isiah Greengrass
