= List of Softly, Softly (TV series) episodes =

This is an episode list for the British television series Softly, Softly. The series aired on BBC1 between 1966 to 1969. Out of the 120 episodes broadcast, 81 are missing, 2 are incomplete and 37 survive.

== Series overview ==
Series	Episodes	Originally released		Status
Series	Episodes	First released	Last released	Status
1	26	5 January 1966	29 June 1966	23 missing, 1 incomplete
2	31	2 November 1966	31 May 1967	29 missing
3	26	4 October 1967	April 1968	20 missing
4	27	12 September 1968	13 March 1969	4 missing, 1 incomplete
5	10	11 September 1969	13 November 1969	5 missing

== Series 1 (1966) ==
No. Overall	No. In Series	Original air date (UK)	Episode title	Episode status
1	1	5 January 1966	Off Beat	Missing
2	2	12 January 1966	The Local Touch	Missing
3	3	19 January 1966	The Misinformer	Missing
4	4	26 January 1966	It Doesn't Grow on Trees	Incomplete
5	5	2 February 1966	Talk to Me…	Exists
6	6	9 February 1966	Screws and Drivers	Missing
7	7	16 February 1966	Take Over	Missing
8	8	23 February 1966	Over Take…	Missing
9	9	2 March 1966	Don't Push Too Hard	Missing
10	10	9 March 1966	The Key	Missing
11	11	16 March 1966	Tickle on Wheels	Missing
12	12	23 March 1966	A Spot of Leave	Missing
13	13	30 March 1966	A to Z	Exists
14	14	6 April 1966	Blind Man's Bluff	Missing
15	15	13 April 1966	All the Flowers	Missing
16	16	20 April 1966	Do You Believe in Ghosts?	Missing
17	17	27 April 1966	There's a Lot of It About	Missing
18	18	4 May 1966	The Gentle Touch	Missing
19	19	11 May 1966	The Short Cut	Missing
20	20	18 May 1966	Made in Britain	Missing
21	21	25 May 1966	Round Trip	Missing
22	22	1 June 1966	Extraction	Missing
23	23	8 June 1966	Best Out of Three	Missing
24	24	15 June 1966	I Know What I Said	Missing
25	25	22 June 1966	Conspiracy: Part 1: To Rob	Missing
26	26	29 June 1966	Conspiracy: Part 2: To Caught	Missing

== Series 2 (1966–67) ==
No. Overall	No. In Series	Original air date (UK)	Episode title	Episode status
27	1	2 November 1966	Inside Out	Missing
28	2	9 November 1966	All That Glitters	Missing
29	3	16 November 1966	The Jackpot	Missing
30	4	23 November 1966	Murder Reported	Missing
31	5	30 November 1966	Sleeping Dogs	Exists
32	6	7 December 1967	Heart of Brass	Missing
33	7	14 December 1966	Find the Lady	Exists
34	8	21 December 1966	Barlow Was There: Part 1: Allegation	Missing
35	9	28 December 1966	Barlow Was There: Part 2: Enquiry	Missing
36	10	4 January 1967	Barlow Was There: Part 3: Mischief	Missing
37	11	11 January 1967	Sing a Song of Friendship	Missing
38	12	18 January 1967	James McNeill, Aged 23	Missing
39	13	25 January 1967	The Next Voice You Hear	Missing
40	14	1 February 1967	An Eye for an Eye	Missing
41	15	8 February 1967	What Colour a Wolf?	Missing
42	16	15 February 1967	Somebody Important	Missing
43	17	22 February 1967	The Informant: Part 1: Rough Justice	Missing
44	18	1 March 1967	The Informant: Part 2: The Man Inside	Missing
45	19	8 March 1967	The Same the Whole World Over	Missing
46	20	15 March 1967	Selection	Missing
47	21	22 March 1967	Appointment in Wyvern	Missing
48	22	29 March 1967	The Investors	Missing
49	23	5 April 1967	A Piece of Waste Ground	Missing
50	24	12 April 1967	Proof Positive	Missing
51	25	19 April 1967	Cash on Deliverance	Missing
52	26	26 April 1967	On the Side of the Law	Missing
53	27	3 May 1967	The Linkman	Missing
54	28	10 May 1967	Blackitt's Round	Missing
55	29	17 May 1967	See You Tomorrow	Missing
56	30	24 May 1967	The Hole: Part 1: In the Road	Missing
57	31	31 May 1967	The Hole: Part 2: In the Head	Missing

== Series 3 (1967–68) ==
No. Overall	No. In Series	Original air date (UK)	Episode title	Episode status
58	1	4 October 1967	The Target: Part 1: Sighted	Missing
59	2	11 October 1967	The Target: Part 2: Point Blank	Missing
60	3	18 October 1967	Material Evidence	Missing
61	4	25 October 1967	Pieces of Silver	Missing
62	5	8 November 1967	Something Unusual	Missing
63	6	15 November 1967	Never Forget a Face	Missing
64	7	22 November 1967	Inducement	Missing
65	8	29 November 1967	The Mind of the Beholder	Missing
66	9	6 December 1967	The Hunt	Exists
67	10	13 December 1967	Measure of Tolerance	Exists
68	11	20 December 1967	Who's Mr. Smith?	Missing
69	12	27 December 1967	The Bombay Doctor	Exists
70	13	4 January 1968	Cause of Death	Missing
71	14	11 January 1968	In Bulk	Missing
72	15	18 January 1968	Complaint	Missing
73	16	25 January 1968	Landing Whispers	Exists
74	17	1 February 1968	Major Incident	Missing
75	18	8 February 1968	Quicker by Rail	Missing
76	19	15 February 1968	The Good Girl	Exists
77	20	22 February 1968	Identity Unknown	Missing
78	21	29 February 1968	Unfinished Business	Exists
79	22	7 March 1968	Finger of Suspension	Missing
80	23	14 March 1968	If I Can Help Somebody	Missing
81	24	21 March 1968	Don't Tell Me, Let Me Guess	Missing
82	25	28 March 1968	Fortune on the Move: Part 1: Payment	Missing
83	26	4 April 1968	Fortune on the Move: Part 2: Refund	Missing

== Series 4 (1968–69) ==
No. Overall	No. In Series	Original air date (UK)	Episode title	Episode status
84	1	12 September 1968	Theory	Exist
85	2	19 September 1968	Proof	Missing
86	3	26 September 1968	Bird of Passage	Missing
87	4	3 October 1968	See the Rabbit	Missing
88	5	10 October 1968	Take Them in Singles	Exists
89	6	17 October 1968	Red Herring	Exists
90	7	24 October 1968	Five Pair O' Hands	Exists
91	8	31 October 1968	Minor Incident	Incomplete
92	9	7 November 1968	An Old Song	Exists
93	10	14 November 1968	Big Boats, Little Boats	Missing
94	11	21 November 1968	For a Rainy Day	Exists
95	12	28 November 1968	Assistance	Exists
96	13	5 December 1968	Equal Status	Exists
97	14	12 December 1968	Obstruction	Exists
98	15	19 December 1968	Going Quietly	Exists
99	16	27 December 1968	On Christmas Day in the Morning	Exists
100	17	2 January 1969	Departure	Exists
101	18	9 January 1969	Cross Reference	Exists
102	19	16 December 1969	Run for the Hills	Exists
103	20	23 January 1969	Pressure	Exists
104	21	30 January 1969	A Quantity of Gelignite	Exists
105	22	6 February 1969	Critical Path	Exists
106	23	13 February 1969	Persistence	Exists
107	24	20 February 1969	Second Chance	Exists
108	25	27 February 1969	How's the Wife, Then?	Exists
109	26	6 March 1969	Right to Search	Exists
110	27	13 March 1969	Proved Connection	Exists

== Series 5 (1969) ==
No. Overall	No. In Series	Original air date (UK)	Episode title	Episode status
111	1	11 September 1969	Recovery	Exists
112	2	18 September 1969	Flash Point	Missing
113	3	25 September 1969	In at the Death	Exists
114	4	2 October 1969	Error of Judgement	Exists
115	5	9 October 1969	Dead Aboard	Exists
116	6	16 October 1969	One Thing Leads to Another	Missing
117	7	23 October 1969	General Post	Missing
118	8	30 October 1969	Wild Goose	Missing
119	9	6 November 1969	We Shall Miss You	Missing
120	10	13 November 1969	Write Off	Exists
