= Trojan Horse (The Avengers) =

- The Avengers episode
- Episode no.: Season 3 Episode 20
- Directed by: Laurence Bourne
- Written by: Malcolm Hulke
- Production code: 3621
- Original air date: 8 February 1964

Guest appearances
- Basil Dignam; T. P. McKenna; Derek Newark; Arthur Pentelow; Geoffrey Whitehead

Episode chronology
← Previous "The Secrets Broker"	Next → "Build a Better Mousetrap"

"Trojan Horse" is the twentieth episode of the third series of the 1960s cult British spy-fi television series The Avengers, starring Patrick Macnee and Honor Blackman. It was first broadcast by ABC on 8 February 1964. The episode was directed by Laurence Bourne and written by Malcolm Hulke.

== Plot ==
Steed and Cathy face horse racing jockeys that are acting as assassins armed with binoculars firing poison darts.

== Cast ==
- Patrick Macnee as John Steed
- Honor Blackman as Cathy Gale
- Basil Dignam as Major Ronald Pantling
- T. P. McKenna as Tony Heuston
- Derek Newark as Johnson
- Arthur Pentelow as George Meadows
- Geoffrey Whitehead as Right Honorable Lucien Ffordsham
- Lucinda Curtis as Ann Meadows
- John Lowe as Lynton Smith
- James Donnelly as Kirby
