= Barlow at Large =

British TV police procedural drama series (1971–1972)

- Also known as: Barlow
- Created by: Troy Kennedy Martin, Elwyn Jones
- Starring: Stratford Johns; Norman Comer; Neil Stacy; Derek Newark
- Theme music composer: Anthony Isaac
- Country of origin: United Kingdom
- No. of series: 4
- No. of episodes: 29 (5 missing)

Production
- Running time: 50 minutes

Original release
- Network: BBC1
- Release: 15 September 1971 – 26 February 1975

Barlow at Large, later Barlow, is a British police procedural television programme starring Stratford Johns in the titular role. A total of 29 episodes over 4 series were produced, and were broadcast on BBC1 between 1971 to 1975.

== Background ==
Johns had previously played Barlow in the Z-Cars, Softly, Softly and Softly, Softly: Task Force series on BBC television during the 1960s and early 1970s. Barlow at Large began as a three-part self-contained spin-off from Softly, Softly: Taskforce in 1971 with Barlow co-opted by the Home Office to investigate police corruption in Wales. Johns left Softly, Softly for good in 1972, but returned for a further series of Barlow at Large in the following year, Barlow having gone on full-time secondment to the Home Office. This second series, rather than telling one story in serial form, as the 1971 series had, was instead ten 50-minute episodes, each with a self-contained story (this would be the format of all subsequent series). In this series, Barlow was supported by Norman Comer as Detective Sergeant Rees, who had been helpful to him during the first series. He also had to deal with the political machinations of the senior civil servant Fenton (Neil Stacy).

In 1974 the series was retitled Barlow and a further two series of eight episodes each followed, introducing the character of Detective Inspector Tucker, played by Derek Newark. In 2015 BBC's Genome Blog noted that as well as a new title the final two series also saw an effort to make the series "more action-packed and modern" including by giving it a "new title sequence and theme tune". The final episode was transmitted in February 1975.

The BBC's Genome Blog argued that the series suffered from the fact that "the concentration on Barlow alone" did not have the same appeal as the earlier series featuring Barlow noting that "the long-running sparring with Watt was hard to replicate".

The Barlow character was seen again in the series Second Verdict in which he, along with his former colleague John Watt (Frank Windsor), looked into unsolved cases and unsafe convictions from history.

== Cast ==
- Stratford Johns – (DCS Charlie Barlow /... 1971, 1973-1975 / Series 1-4 / 29 episodes)
- Norman Comer – (DS David Rees /... 1971, 1973-1974 / Series 1-3 / 13 episodes)
- Neil Stacy – (A. G.(Anthony Gordon) Fenton /... 1973-1975 / Series 2-4 / 18 episodes)
- Derek Newark – (DI Eddie Tucker /... 1974-1975 / Series 3-4 / 15 episodes)

Others:

- Tenniel Evans – (Chief Con. James 1971 / Series 1 / 2 episodes)
- Philip Madoc – (Rizzi 1973-1975 / Series 2-4 / 3 episodes)
- Noel Willman – (Sir Hugh Anderson 1973-1974 / Series 2-3 / 2 episodes)
- Ray McAnally – (Commander Benson 1973-1974 / Series 2-3 / 2 episodes)
- Peter Sallis – (Joseph Miller 1974 / Series 3 / 1 episode)

== Episodes ==
Episodes were 50 minutes in length and were filmed in colour:

- Series 1: 15 – 29 September 1971, 3 episodes
- Series 2: 7 February – 11 April 1973, 10 episodes
- Series 3: 23 January – 13 March 1974, 8 episodes
- Series 4: 8 January – 26 February 1975, 8 episodes

=== Series 1 (1971) ===
No. overall	No. in Series	Title	Air Date	Directed By	Written By	Archival Status	Media
1	1	"A Welcome in the Hillside"	15 September 1971	Simon Langton	Elwyn Jones	Exists	16mm colour film
2	2	"Come to Dust"	22 September 1971	Michael Simpson	Elwyn Jones	Exists	16mm colour film
3	3	"Heat of the Sun"	29 September 1971	Leonard Lewis	Elwyn Jones	Exists	16mm colour film

=== Series 2 (1973) ===
No. overall	No. in Series	Title	Air Date	Directed By	Written By	Archival Status	Media
4	1	"Strays"	7 February 1973	Gilchrist Calder	Elwyn Jones	Exists	PAL 2" colour videotape
5	2	"Wanted"	14 February 1973	Michael Hayes	Elwyn Jones	Exists	16mm colour film
6	3	"Review"	21 February 1973	Frank Cox	Robert Barr	Exists	PAL 2" colour videotape
7	4	"Publicity"	28 February 1973	Michael Hayes	Allan Prior	Exists	PAL 2" colour videotape
8	5	"Wheelbarrows"	7 March 1973	Gilchrist Calder	Arnold Yarrow	Exists	16mm t/r
9	6	"Informant"	14 March 1973	Frank Cox	James Doran	Exists	16mm t/r
10	7	"Trespass"	21 March 1973	Roderick Graham	Arnold Yarrow	Exists	16mm t/r
11	8	"Assessor"	28 March 1973	Gilchrist Calder	Allan Prior	Exists	16mm t/r
12	9	"Treasure"	4 April 1973	Elwyn Jones	Keith Williams	Exists	16mm colour film
13	10	"Confidence"	11 April 1973	Geraint Morris	Elwyn Jones	Exists	16mm t/r

=== Series 3 (1974) ===
No. overall	No. in Series	Title	Air Date	Directed By	Written By	Archival Status	Media
14	1	"Big Deal"	21 January 1974	George Spenton-Foster	Brian Hayles	Exists	PAL 2" colour videotape
15	2	"Snatch"	28 January 1974	Paul Ciappessoni	Allan Prior	Exists	PAL 2" colour videotape
16	3	"Plunder"	6 February 1974	Michael Hayes	Arnold Yarrow	Exists	PAL 2" colour videotape
17	4	"Hit"	13 February 1974	Gilchrist Calder	Allan Prior	Exists	16mm t/r
18	5	"Corruption"	20 February 1974	Martin Friend	Ian Curteis	Exists	16mm t/r
19	6	"Restitution"	27 February 1974	David Proudfoot	Elwyn Jones	Exists	PAL 2" colour videotape
20	7	"Snookered"	6 March 1974	Paul Ciappessoni	Elwyn Jones	Exists	PAL 2" colour videotape
21	8	"Sect"	13 March 1974	George Spenton-Foster	Jack Ronder	Exists	PAL 2" colour videotape

=== Series 4 (1975) ===
No. overall	No. in Series	Title	Air Date	Directed By	Written By	Archival Status	Media
22	1	"Vindication"	8 January 1975	Michael Hayes	Elwyn Jones	Missing	n/a
23	2	"Away"	15 January 1975	Michael Hayes	Allan Prior	Exists	PAL 2" colour videotape
24	3	"Bullion"	22 January 1975	Ben Rea	Ian Curteis	Missing	n/a
25	4	"Rat Run"	29 January 1975	Terrence Williams	Ian Curteis	Missing	n/a
26	5	"Asylum"	5 February 1975	Paul Ciappessoni	Allan Prior	Exists	PAL 2" colour videotape
27	6	"Contessa"	12 February 1975	Ben Rea	Jack Ronder	Missing	n/a
28	7	"Nemesis"	19 February 1975	Paul Ciappessoni	Allan Prior	Missing	n/a
29	8	"Protection"	26 February 1975	Geraint Morris	Elwyn Jones	Exists	PAL 2" colour videotape

== Archival Status ==
Due to the BBC's wiping policy at the time, 5 episodes all from Series 4 are missing from the archives. Of its entire run, only 12 episodes survive on 2" PAL Colour Videotape, while a further 7 episodes exist as b&w 16mm telerecordings. All of the episodes shot entirely on film also survive, this includes the whole of Series 1 and the Series 2 episodes "Wanted" and "Treasure" respectively.
