= Loophonium =

Humorous brass instrument

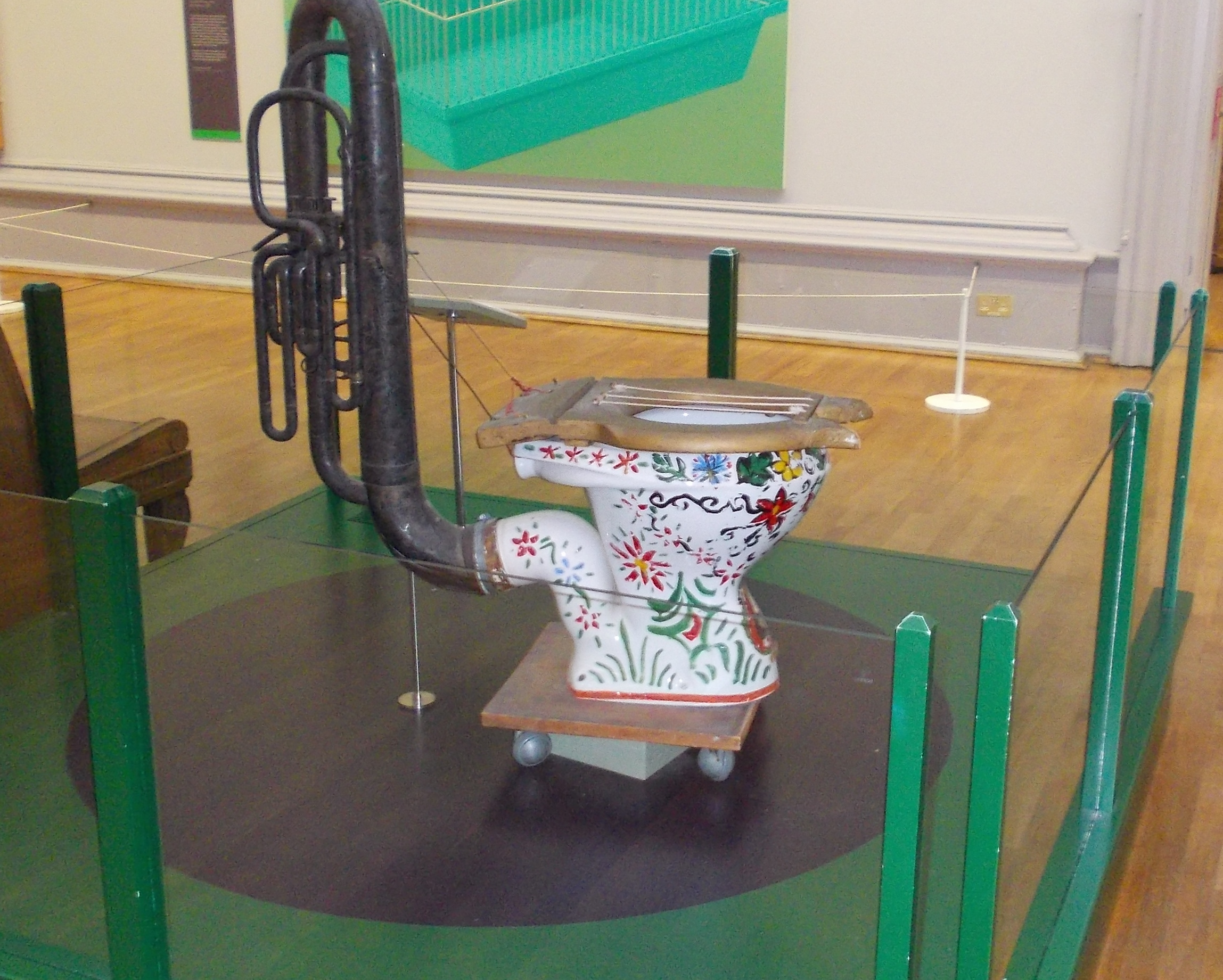
- The Loophonium at the Walker Art Gallery, Liverpool

Brass instrument
- Other names: Harpic-cord
- Classification: Aerophone
- Inventor: Fritz Spiegl
- Developed: 20th century

Related instruments
- Euphonium

The Loophonium is a brass instrument created by Fritz Spiegl. Designed in 1960, it is a cross between a euphonium and a toilet. It is in the Walker Art Gallery.

== Etymology ==
The Loophonium is a portmanteau of loo, a British name for a toilet, and euphonium. The Loophonium's alternative name, the Harpic-cord (or Harpic-phone), is a play both on the harpsichord instrument and the Harpic brand of toilet cleaner.

== Origins ==
The Loophonium was designed and fabricated by Fritz Spiegl in Liverpool in 1960. Spiegl was known for his musical jokes; he had previously composed music such as a Concerto for Two Tuning Forks and the Motor Horn Concerto. The instrument was made to use for concerts held by the Royal Liverpool Philharmonic on April Fools' Day at the Philharmonic Hall. Spiegl had been holding these concerts since 1952. During this time, Spiegl was the principal flautist of the orchestra (1948–1963).

== Design ==
The Loophonium consists of two parts: a silver-plated euphonium with Perinet valves connected at the bell to a mock-Victorian toilet. The toilet was painted with flower designs by Spiegl's eight-year-old daughter, Emily. The toilet seat is in the shape of a golden three-stringed lyre.

== Usage ==
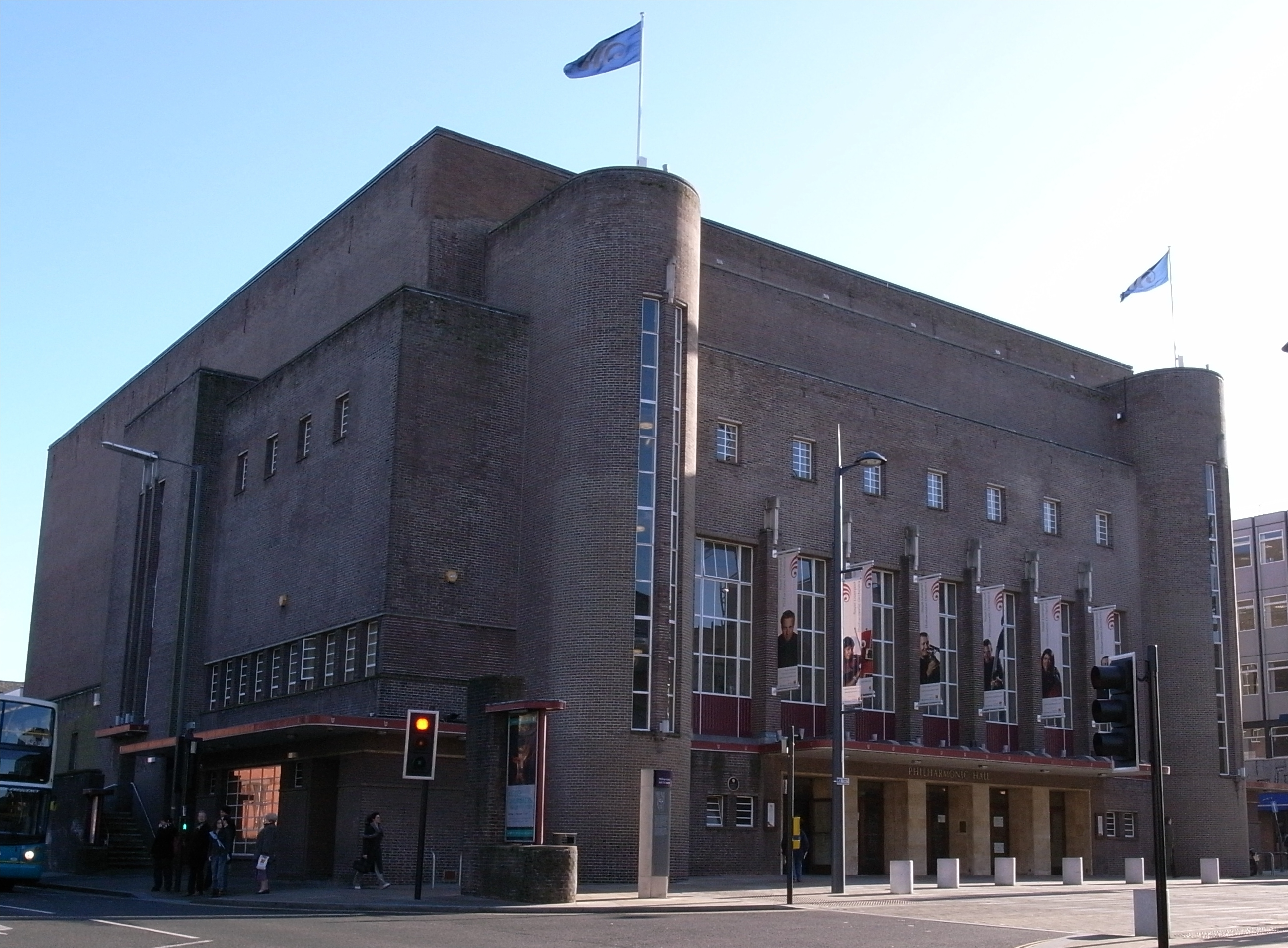
Philharmonic Hall, home to the Royal Liverpool Philharmonic

The Loophonium was played by Spiegl at the Royal Liverpool Philharmonic's April Fools' Day and "Nuts in May" concerts. When the national anthem was played at concerts involving the Loophonium, the toilet seat would be raised as if to salute. It was also used once by the City of Birmingham Symphony Orchestra, where it was played by the principal tuba.

The Loophonium resided at the house of Peter Spaull, a classical music journalist, for two years. It was played on New Year's Eve by Spaull to bring in the new year.

After Spiegl's death in 2003, the Loophonium was sold to the Walker Art Gallery in Liverpool for a price of £2,640. It was sold at Sotheby's Bond Street auction house on 23 November in a lot of 103 instruments. The sale also included a copy of Spiegl's Music Through the Looking Glass. After a repair in 2004 at the National Conservation Centre, the Loophonium was put on display in 2006 at the William Brown Street gallery. The display includes a speaker that plays a recording of Frère Jacques on the Loophonium. The absurdity of the instrument makes it very popular with children.
