= Theme from Z-Cars =

Television theme song

Single by John Keating and His Orchestra
- B-side: "Lost Patrol"
- Released: 1962
- Genre: Theme tune
- Length: 2:13
- Label: Piccadilly
- Songwriters: Fritz Spiegl; Bridget Fry

"Theme from Z-Cars" was the theme tune to the long-running BBC television drama Z-Cars. It was based on the traditional folk song "Johnny Todd", which appeared in Frank Kidson’s 1891 collection Traditional Tunes: A Collection of Ballad Airs. Kidson described "Johnny Todd" as a children’s rhyme and game heard among Liverpool children, noting that the words seemed old but were partially reconstructed due to gaps in the reciter’s memory. The song also appears in Songs of Belfast, edited by David Hammond, who learned it from Mrs. Walker of Salisbury Avenue, Belfast, who claimed it dated from around 1900. A version of the song is also mentioned in the first of the Para Handy stories, written in Scotland in 1905, which stated that the tune had been popular about thirty years earlier.

The Z-Cars theme was arranged for commercial release by Fritz Spiegl and Bridget Fry, and performed by John Keating and his Orchestra. The single reached number 8 in the Record Retailer chart in April 1962, and as high as number 5 in other charts. The original television theme was arranged and conducted by Norrie Paramor with his orchestra. Episode credits from at least three of the 1962 broadcasts include the line "Music arranged by / BRIDGET FRY / and FRITZ SPIEGL".

== Football ==
The tune was adopted by supporters of Everton F.C., a First Division association football club based in Liverpool. It was initially played in honour of actor Leonard Williams, who attended a match while appearing in the series. Following Williams’s death five days later, Everton played the theme again as a tribute at the next home match. Everton went on to win the League Championship in 1963, ending a 26-year wait. After fans associated the tune with subsequent victories, it became a regular feature before home games. The theme continues to be played as the team enters the pitch at both Hill Dickinson Stadium and their previous home of Goodison Park, and it is also used in the club’s official podcasts.

In 1964, Watford F.C. adopted the tune at the request of then-manager Bill McGarry, who was a fan of the television programme. The tune has been played as the players enter the pitch since that time, becoming associated with the club’s rise under manager Graham Taylor in the 1970s and 1980s. Sunderland A.F.C. also used the song as entrance music for players at their former ground, Roker Park, and it has similarly been played at Borough Park, the home of Workington A.F.C.
