= Z-car (disambiguation) =

Z-car is the Nissan Z-car, a series of sports cars.

Z-car/Z-Cars, zed-car or zee-cars may also refer to:

== Automobiles ==
- Ford Zephyr, an executive car by Ford of Britain from 1950 to 1972
- BMW Z, a line of roadsters
  - BMW Z1, a two-seat roadster
  - BMW Z3, the first modern mass-market roadster produced by BMW
  - BMW Z4, a rear-wheel drive sports car
    - BMW Z4 (E85)
    - BMW Z4 (E89)
    - BMW Z4 (G29)
  - BMW Z8, limited edition high-performance rear wheel drive sports car
- Mitsubishi Z platform, a series of small cars on a shared platform built by Mitsubishi Motors and DaimlerChrysler
- Lincoln Z, a Chinese mid-size luxury sedan produced since 2022 onwards by Changan Ford
- HiPhi Z, a Chinese executive car produced since 2022 onwards by HiPhi
- Denza Z, a Chinese coupe and convertible to be produced from 2026 by BYD Auto

=== Police cars ===
- Z-Car, specific models of mid-20th century or generally police vehicles in the United Kingdom
  - Z-Cars, a British 1960s and 1970s television police drama series

=== Military vehicles ===
- Z (military symbol), a nickname for Russian military vehicles hence the z-logo used in the Russo-Ukrainian war.

== See also ==
- Panda car, a small or medium-sized marked British police car
- Honda Z, a two-door hatchback car by Honda from 1970 until 1974
