= Joseph Brady (actor) =

Scottish actor (1928–2001)

- Born: 9 October 1928; Glasgow, Lanarkshire, Scotland
- Died: 12 June 2001 (aged 72); London, England
- Occupation: Actor

Joseph Brady (9 October 1928 – 12 June 2001) was a Scottish actor. He starred in a number of television shows, notably as PC Jock Weir in Z-Cars (1962–67, returning for a cameo in the final episode in 1978), as Kenny McBlane in the third series of The Fall and Rise of Reginald Perrin (1978–79) and as Gramps in the 1993 Rab C. Nesbitt episode "Right".

He also made appearances in films such as The Fourth Protocol and played the part of the ship's purser in Brideshead Revisited.

== Theatre ==
Year	Title	Role	Company	Director	Notes
1972	Willie Rough	Pat Gatens	Lyceum Theatre, Edinburgh	Bill Bryden	
1972	Kidnapped	James of the Glens	Lyceum Theatre, Edinburgh	Bill Bryden	adaptation by Keith Dewhurst
1990	The Ship	Gus	The Ship's Company, Govan	Bill Bryden	play by Bill Bryden staged at Harland and Wolff, Govan

== Filmography ==
Year	Title	Role	Notes
1964	Father Came Too!	Guy Fawkes	
1975	The Firefighters	Det. Sgt. Carter	
1980	Lady Killers	Mr. Beattie	
1981	If You Go Down in the Woods Today	Father Williams	
1987	The Fourth Protocol	Carmichael	
