= Jack the Ripper (1973 TV series) =

- Created by: Troy Kennedy Martin; Elwyn Jones
- Written by: Elwyn Jones; John Lloyd
- Starring: Stratford Johns; Frank Windsor
- Country of origin: United Kingdom
- No. of series: 1
- No. of episodes: 6

Production
- Running time: 50 minutes

Original release
- Network: BBC1
- Release: 13 July – 17 August 1973

Jack the Ripper is a six-part BBC police procedural made in 1973, in which the case of the Jack the Ripper murders is reopened and analysed by Detective Chief Superintendents Barlow and Watt (Stratford Johns and Frank Windsor, respectively). These characters were hugely popular with UK TV viewers at the time from their appearances on the long-running police series Z-Cars and its sequels Softly, Softly and Barlow at Large. The programme was presented partly as a discussion between the two principals in the present day, interspersed with dramatised-documentary scenes set in the 19th century. The series discusses suspects and conspiracies, but concludes there is insufficient evidence to determine the true identity of Jack the Ripper. The experiment was seen to be a success, and the formula was repeated in 1976 with Second Verdict, in which Barlow and Watt cast their gaze over miscarriages of justice and unsolved mysteries from the past.

== Cast ==
- Stratford Johns as DCS Charlie Barlow
- Frank Windsor as DCS John Watt
- Gordon Christie as Inspector Abberline
- Hugo De Vernier as Albert Cadoche
- Christopher Fenwick as John Richardson
- Chris Gannon as Timothy Donovan
- Gabrielle Hamilton as Mrs. Richardson
- Basil Henson as Sir Charles Warren
- Julie May as Mrs Fiddymont
- Geoffrey Rose as Dr. Bagster Phillips
- Rosalind Ross as Elizabeth Long
- Hilary Sesta as Catherine Eddowes
- Peter Spraggon as Sergeant Thicke
- Varley Thomas as Emily Holland
- Kenneth Thornett as PC Neil
- Gabor Vernon as Louis Diemschütz
- Wendy Williams as Mrs Barnett
- Geoffrey Lumsden as editor of the Daily Telegraph
- Simon Cuff as John Saul

== Episodes ==
No.	Title	Directed by	Written by	Original release date
1	"The First Two"	Leonard Lewis	Elwyn Jones and John Lloyd	13 July 1973
2	"Double Event"	Gilchrist Calder	Elwyn Jones and John Lloyd	20 July 1973
3	"Butchery"	David Wickes	Elwyn Jones and John Lloyd	27 July 1973
4	"Panic"	Leonard Lewis	Elwyn Jones and John Lloyd	3 August 1973
5	"Suspects"	Gilchrist Calder	Elwyn Jones and John Lloyd	10 August 1973
6	"The Highest in the Land?"	David Wickes	Elwyn Jones and John Lloyd	17 August 1973

== Release ==
Jack the Ripper was made available for syndication. It was first distributed by 20th Century-Fox Television, in cooperation with Metromedia.

When televised in the United States, it featured Sebastian Cabot as host-narrator, and was broadcast variably using the title The Whitechapel Murders or the original Jack the Ripper.

The series was also adapted into a book titled The Ripper File, authored by series script writers Elwyn Jones and John Lloyd. The 1979 film Murder by Decree, starring Christopher Plummer as Sherlock Holmes investigating the Whitechapel murders, was based on The Ripper File.
