= Inky (police dog) =

Fictional police dog

Inky was a police dog who appeared in the British police drama Softly, Softly: Task Force during 1969–70. His handler was PC Snow, played by Terence Rigby. He is remembered for a minor stir he caused on British television.

The scriptwriter wanted to show something of the dangers police officers sometimes faced in their work, but thought it might upset the viewers if one of the characters was killed, so he wrote an episode where the police dog was shot and killed by a gunman. The episode was "Escort", the sixteenth and last in series 1 (transmitted 12 March 1970). Some viewers were upset by this episode, and shortly after Inky appeared on the children's programme Blue Peter to assure children who had seen the programme that he was all right.

Inky's replacement on the programme was Radar. Radar died between series and members of the cast were pressured by the BBC to attend the dog's funeral.

== See also ==
- List of individual dogs
