= That Summer! =

1979 British drama film

- Film poster
- Directed by: Harley Cokeliss
- Written by: Tony Attard; Jane Preger
- Produced by: Davina Belling
- Starring: Ray Winstone; Tony London; Emily Moore; Julie Shipley
- Music by: Ray Russell
- Distributed by: Columbia-EMI-Warner Distributors
- Release date: 3 August 1979 (United Kingdom)
- Running time: 94 minutes
- Country: United Kingdom
- Language: English

That Summer! is a 1979 British drama film directed by Harley Cokeliss and starring Ray Winstone, Tony London, Emily Moore and Julie Shipley. It was Ray Winstone's theatrical film debut, playing the character Steve Brodie. Both Ray Winstone and Tony London had previously appeared together in Alan Clarke's Scum alongside John Judd.

== Plot ==
It is the story of a 21-year-old named Steve Brodie who goes to the Devon seaside resort of Torquay after leaving borstal where he is seen easily winning in a swimming race. He befriends the son of a butcher from London named Jimmy and they start dating two girls from Northern England. Steve works in a pub, Jimmy hires skiffs on the beach and the girls are employed as chambermaids at a hotel. Three loutish Scottish youths have some confrontations with Steve and then frame him for a robbery at a chemist shop. This leads to his arrest just before the start of a 'round the bay' swimming race in which he is due to compete against one of them.

== Cast ==
- Ray Winstone – Steve Brodie
- Tony London – Jimmy
- Emily Moore – Carole
- Julie Shipley – Angie
- Andrew Byatt – Georgie
- Jon Morrison – Tam
- Ewan Stewart – Stu
- John Junkin – Mr Swales
- John Judd – Swimming coach
- David Daker – Pub landlord
- Jo Rowbottom – Pub landlady
- Stephanie Cole – Mrs Mainwaring
- Nicholas Donnelly – Detective
- Nick Stringer – Policeman
- Michael Crolla – Barman in Disco
- Colin Higgins – Probation officer
- Ben Howard – Borstal officer
- Michael J. Jackson – Hotel clerk
- David Lloyd Meredith – Beach skiff man
- David Pratt – Coach Driver

== Award ==
Winstone received a BAFTA nomination as Best Newcomer for his performance in the film and he met his wife-to-be Elaine when shooting it in Torquay.

== Music ==
Songs by new wave groups including Elvis Costello and The Attractions, Ian Dury, The Undertones and the Ramones can be heard in the background during beach and pub scenes and a soundtrack was released on Arista Records. The soundtrack was produced as an LP with several punk/new wave bands. The album was available on unique yellow vinyl.
