= Fritz Spiegl =

Austrian writer (1926–2003)

Fritz Spiegl (27 January 1926 – 23 March 2003) was an Austrian-born English musician, journalist, broadcaster, humorist and collector who lived in Britain from 1939. His works include compiling the Radio 4 UK Theme in 1978.

== Early life ==
Spiegl was born near the Hungarian border in the village of Zurndorf, Burgenland, Austria, where his father was a businessman manufacturing among other things carbonated water. Spiegl attended the Gymnasium in Eisenstadt but, as the family were Jewish, they were persecuted by the Nazis in the wake of the Anschluss of 1938. All their property having been confiscated, Fritz's parents succeeded in leaving the country in 1939, eventually escaping to Bolivia while sending Fritz and his older sister Hanny (born 1923) to Northamptonshire, England.

On arrival in Britain, Spiegl was sent to Magdalen College School, Brackley, where he learned little beyond "rugger, plane-spotting and a bit of Latin". Eventually he went to London to work for an advertising agency. But he soon switched to music, taught himself to play the flute, enrolled at the Royal Academy of Music and, within a short time, became principal flautist with the Royal Liverpool Philharmonic Orchestra, a position he kept for more than a decade. Ear damage appears to have played a part in his exit from professional playing, as in later years he would occasionally refer to having been "invalided out by the brass section".

== Career ==
A resident of Liverpool, he organised annual Nuts in May concerts, featuring the Loophonium, a "Liszt Twist" and other parody items. This approach helped draw new young audiences into concert halls. Less attracted to pop music, Spiegl once called the Beatles phenomenon "the greatest confidence trick since the Virgin Birth". His name was often misspelt, including Spiegel, Spiegle, Speigl, Speigel or Speigle. He was a supporter of Liverpool Football Club.

A native speaker of German, Fritz Spiegl did not speak a word of English when he moved to Britain as a 13-year-old—a fact which has often been regarded as the trigger for his preoccupation with language phenomena such as, say, malapropisms and for the biting yet humorous linguistic purism of his later years. As one commentator remarked, Spiegl

...soon knew a great deal more about the language than most English people do. And cared more too. One can understand this. It's galling, when you've taken the trouble to learn that "an alibi" is not the same as "an excuse", to find that the natives themselves seem to have forgotten the difference.

Fritz Spiegl died suddenly aged 77 during a Sunday lunch in Liverpool with his wife, Ingrid Frances Spiegl, and some friends.

== Works ==
=== Compositions ===
As a composer, Spiegl scored a popular success with the original theme from the TV series Z-Cars, based on "Johnny Todd", a Liverpool sea shanty. He also composed the original theme for the Z Cars spin-off series Softly, Softly; the song was also released as a single on Andrew Loog Oldham's Immediate record label in 1966. Another signature tune was 'Conversation Piece' for In the Psychiatrist's Chair, which was based on music from Mozart's Les Petits Riens transcribed for wind instruments.

His BBC Radio 4 UK Theme, in which national songs from each of the four constituent countries of the United Kingdom are combined, was heard on Radio 4 at the beginning of each morning's broadcasting from November 1978 until April 2006. His Eine kleine Beatlemusic was performed in London and later recorded, as was Valkyrie And The Rhine Maidens - On The Bayreuth Beat.

=== Selected books ===
- The Black On White Misprint Show (More Clangers & Other Disasters In Cold Print) (1966)
- How to Talk Proper in Liverpool (Lern Yerself Scouse S.) (1966)
- What the Papers Didn't Mean to Say (1966)
- A Small Book of Grave Humour (1971) ISBN 978-0330028714
- Dead Funny: Another Book of Grave Humour (1982) ISBN 978-0330268288
- Keep Taking the Tabloids. What the Papers Say and How They Say It (1983)
- Music Through the Looking-Glass subtitled 'A very personal kind of Dictionary of Musicians' Jargon, Shop-Talk and Nicknames; and a Mine of Information about Musical Curiosities, Strange Instruments, Word Origins, Odd Facts, Orchestral Players' Lore and Wicked Stories about the Music Profession' (1984) Routledge & Kegan Paul. ISBN 0-7102-0401-9
- The Joy of Words. A Bedside Book for English Lovers (1986)
- Fritz Spiegl's Book of Musical Blunders and other Musical Curiosities (1996) Robson Books Ltd. ISBN 1-86105-075-5
- The Lives, Wives and Loves of the Great Composers (1997) Marion Boyars Publishers Ltd. ISBN 0-7145-2917-6
- An Illustrated Everyday History of Liverpool and Merseyside (1998)
- MuSick Notes: A Medical Songbook (2001)
- Contradictionary: Of Confusibles, Lookalikes and Soundalikes (published posthumously in 2003)

== See also ==
- List of Austrian writers
