= Frank Windsor =

English actor (1928–2020)

- Born: Frank Windsor Higgins; 12 July 1928; Walsall, Staffordshire, England
- Died: 30 September 2020 (aged 92); London, England
- Education: Royal Central School of Speech and Drama
- Occupation: Actor
- Years active: 1959–2004
- Spouse: Mary Corbett (m. 1959)
- Children: 2

Frank Windsor Higgins (12 July 1928 – 30 September 2020), known professionally as Frank Windsor, was an English actor, primarily known for his roles on television, especially policeman John Watt in Z-Cars and its spin-offs.

== Early life ==
Windsor attended Queen Mary's Grammar School, Walsall, and studied speech training and drama at the Central School of Speech and Drama, then based at the Royal Albert Hall, London.

== Career ==
Windsor played Detective Sergeant John Watt in Z-Cars from 1962 to 1965, and thereafter its spin-offs Softly, Softly (1966–1969), Softly, Softly: Task Force (1969–1976), Jack the Ripper (1973), and Second Verdict (1976). He also returned as Watt for the final episode of Z-Cars itself in 1978.

In 1969, Windsor appeared in the pilot episode of Randall and Hopkirk (Deceased) in the episode "My Late Lamented Friend and Partner" as Sorrensen, a wealthy businessman with a murderous streak. His lighter side was demonstrated in the pilot episode of the situation comedy The Dustbinmen in 1968, and as Scoutfinder General in an episode of The Goodies. He also appeared as "Tobin" in Series 6, Episode 9 of The Avengers.

From 1987 to 1989, Windsor starred in the comedy drama Flying Lady written by Brian Finch. He also starred as a rather old-fashioned headmaster grappling with problems in education in Headmaster, which started as a single play in Play for Today in 1974. It was expanded into a six-part series in 1977.

Windsor had regular roles in the BBC drama Casualty and the ITV drama Peak Practice, and played Major Charlie Grace in EastEnders (1992). He appeared twice in Doctor Who; and had various stage roles. In his later years he appeared in television commercials advertising life-assurance policies for people over 50. He was the subject of This Is Your Life on 3 December 1975 when he was surprised by Eamonn Andrews at the Metropolitan Police Sports Club in East Molesey.

== Personal life ==
Windsor was married to Mary Corbett from October 1959 until his death. They had two children.

Windsor died at his home in London in September 2020, at the age of 92.

== Partial filmography ==
- This Sporting Life (1963) – Dentist
- The Jokers (1967) – Policeman in Court (uncredited)
- Randall and Hopkirk (Deceased) (1968) S1:E1
- Spring and Port Wine (1969) – Ned Duckworth
- Dropout (1970)
- Sunday Bloody Sunday (1971) – Bill Hodson
- Assassin (1973) – John Stacy
- Barry McKenzie Holds His Own (1974) – Police Sergeant
- Who Is Killing the Great Chefs of Europe? (1978) – Blodgett
- The London Connection (1979) – McGuffin
- Coming Out of the Ice (1982) – Sam Herman
- Doctor Who – serials The King's Demons (1983) and Ghost Light (1989)
- The Shooting Party (1985) – Glass
- Revolution (1985) – Gen. Washington
- Out of Order (1987) – Traffic Warden
- All Creatures Great and Small (1989) – David Rayner in episode "Mending Fences"
- Lovejoy (1991) – Ralph Peagram in episode "Raise the Hispanic"
- EastEnders (1 episode in 1992) – Major Grace
- Midsomer Murders (1999) – George Meakham in S2:E2 "Strangler's Wood"
- Between Two Women (2000) – Mr Walker (final film role)
- Judge John Deed (2002–3) – Sir James Valentine in episodes "Abuse of Power", "Everyone's Child" and "Health Hazard"
