= Johnny Keating =

Scottish songwriter, arranger and trombonist (1927–2015)

John Keating (10 September 1927 – 28 May 2015) was a Scottish musician, songwriter, arranger and trombonist.

== Biography ==
Keating was born in Edinburgh, Scotland. After studying piano and trombone, he taught himself how to arrange and compose in his teens. From 1952, he worked with British big band leader Ted Heath as a trombonist, but within two years Heath asked him to become his primary arranger. In the early 1960s, he and songwriter Johnny Worth (writing as Les Vandyke) masterminded the career of a minor British pop star, Eden Kane. The team wrote and produced a string of British top 10 hits for Kane in 1961–63. In addition he wrote, produced or arranged hits by Adam Faith, Petula Clark, Anthony Newley, Shani Wallis, Caterina Valente, and Sammy Davis Jr. among others.

Keating arranged and conducted a series of albums for London Records' Phase 4 series, notable for its use of synthesiser technology such as the Moog synthesizer and the EMS VCS 3. The records were often used as demonstration discs in the 1970s in Hi-Fi stores because of their quality. Much of his work was rereleased following the Lounge music revival of the mid-1990s and its use as breakbeats.

His "Theme from Z-Cars", a #8 hit in the 1962 UK Singles Chart, was adopted by Everton F.C. as their theme song. Additionally he composed the scores for the films Hotel (1967), Robbery (1967), and Innocent Bystanders (1972). His song "Bunny Hop" was also featured in the Tim Burton film, Ed Wood (1994).

As founder and principal of the Johnny Keating School of Music, Edinburgh, he was directly responsible for the musical education of many students who later became successful professionals.

In 1999, he completed a four–volume academic reference book dedicated to the art of professional songwriting: Principles of Songwriting: A Study in Structure and Technique.

Keating died in London, England, on 28 May 2015 at the age of 87.

== Album discography ==
- English Jazz - 1956 - Bally
- Swinging Scots - 1957 - Dot
- Percussive Moods SP44005 - 1963 - London Phase 4 Stereo
- Temptation SP44019 - 1963 - London Phase 4 Stereo
- Swing Revisited SP44034 - 1963 - London Phase 4 Stereo
- Johnny Keating and 27 Men-The Keating Sound SP44058 - 1966 - London Phase 4 Stereo
- Keating...Straight Ahead SP44072 - 1966 - London Phase 4 Stereo
- This Bird Has Flown WS1638 - 1966 - Warner Bros.
- Here's Where It Is WS1666 - 1966 - Warner Bros.
- Sounds Galactic - An Astromusical Odyssey SP44154 - 1971 - London Phase 4 Stereo
- Space Experience CQ 32382 - 1972 - Columbia Records (Quadraphonic)
- John Keating Conducts the London Symphony Orchestra - 1972
- Songs of Love - John & Thelma Keating with the London Symphony Orchestra (1973)
- John Keating Conducts the Electronic Philharmonic Orchestra - 1974 - EMI

- "Fanfare for the Common Man"
- "Sabre Dance"
- "Tristan und Isolde: Prelude, Act III"
- "Lohengrin: Prelude, Act III"
- "Hebridean Impressions" (written by Keating)

- Space Experience, Vol. 1 & 2 - 1998 - EMI (Vol. 1 contains the LP Space Experience)
- Temptation & Percussive Moods - 2004 - Vocalion
- Swing Revisited - 2004 - Dutton Vocalion
- British Jazz - 2005 - Harkit
- British Jazz and Swinging Scots - 2008 - British Jazz

== Songwriting credits ==
- "A Little Waltzin'"
- "Barber Shop Jump" - Ted Heath
- "Come Live With Me" - Carmen McRae
- "Headin' North"
- "It's Not Going That Way" - Carmen McRae, Vic Lewis
- "Merry Merry-Go-Round (Theme from 'The Jean Arthur Show')"
- "On With the Don" - Ted Heath
- "Same Old Moon" - Percy Faith
- "Send for Henry" - Heinz Schonberger, Henry Main
- "The Clown"
- "This Hotel" a.k.a. "Hotel" - Carmen McRae, Percy Faith, Shirley Horn, Nancy Wilson, Stan Kenton, Todd Gordon
