= Home Office radio =

Communications service for UK prisons and emergency services

Home Office radio was the VHF and UHF radio service provided by the British government to its prison service, emergency service (police, ambulance and fire brigade) and Home Defence agencies from around 1939. The departmental name was the Home Office Directorate of Telecommunications, commonly referred to as DTELS.

Prior to this, contact by emergency service personnel with their control rooms was made by telephone. Then in 1922 the Metropolitan Police began to install radio receivers in their vehicles. Due to telegraphy only being one way, take up was slow. By the 1970s most police and fire services had their own dedicated radio setups, and personal radios (referred to as PRs) were beginning to be rolled out to the police in most towns and cities. Home Office radio was furthered towards the end of the Cold War, with having a communications network that was independent of the then Post Office deemed a necessity should Britain come under attack from nuclear weapons.

Radio schemes run by DTELS consisted of ten wireless depots throughout England, Scotland and Wales, supplemented further by around sixty outstations. Ten regions were designated along the same regional boundaries as the Home Defence were, and within each region was a wireless telegraph station. The Home Office allocated four-character call signs beginning with M2 to every police and fire service, with respective control rooms starting and ending every transmission with said call sign. An oddity of the system was that call signs were often spoken as letters rather than phonetically: "MP" would be said as "Em-Pee" rather than "Mike Papa". This varied between regions.

== Regions ==
England - Regions 2 to 10 excluding 8,

Scotland - Region 1,

Wales - Region 8.

== Police radio codes ==
PNC code	HO Radio code	Police force
52	QP	Avon and Somerset Constabulary
40	VA	Bedfordshire Police
93	BX	British Transport Police
35	VB	Cambridgeshire Constabulary
84	AH	Police Scotland (formerly Central Scotland Police)
07	BA	Cheshire Constabulary
48	CP	City of London Police
17	LZ	Cleveland Police
03	BB	Cumbria Constabulary
30	NA	Derbyshire Constabulary
50	QB	Devon and Cornwall Constabulary
55	QC	Dorset Police
70	AJ	Police Scotland (formerly Dumfries & Galloway Constabulary)
11	LA	Durham Constabulary
63	WH	Heddlu Dyfed Powys Police
42	VG	Essex Police
78	ZT	Police Scotland (formerly Fife Constabulary)
53	QL	Gloucestershire Constabulary
82	UB	Police Scotland (formerly Grampian Police)
06	CK	Greater Manchester Police
61	WO	Heddlu Gwent Police
44	HC	Hampshire & Isle of Wight Constabulary
41	VH	Hertfordshire Constabulary
16	XH	Humberside Police
46	KA	Kent Police
04	BD	Lancashire Constabulary
33	NL	Leicestershire Constabulary
32	NC	Lincolnshire Police
76	ZH	Police Scotland (formerly Lothian & Borders Police)
05	CH	Merseyside Police
01	MP	Metropolitan Police (also 02)
02	GT	Metropolitan Police (special events)
24	MD	Ministry of Defence Police
36	VK	Norfolk Constabulary
34	NG	Northamptonshire Police
10	LB	Northumbria Police
12	XN	North Yorkshire Police
60	WA	Heddlu North Wales Police
31	NH	Nottinghamshire Police
62	WL	Heddlu South Wales Police
14	XS	South Yorkshire Police
21	YF	Staffordshire Police
74	AS	Police Scotland (formerly Strathclyde Police)
37	VL	Suffolk Constabulary
45	HJ	Surrey Police
47	KB	Sussex Police
80	ZS	Police Scotland (formerly Tayside Police)
43	HB	Thames Valley Police
23	YJ	Warwickshire Police
22	YK	West Mercia Police
20	YM	West Midlands Police
13	XW	West Yorkshire Police
54	QJ	Wiltshire Police

== Airwave ==
In 1991 the Directorate of Telecommunications officially changed its name to DTELS and four years later became a private sector company following a trade sale to National Transcommunications Limited (NTL).

By the last quarter of 2006 police forces had migrated radio networks from the UHF frequencies to TeTRa on the Airwave network, followed by ambulance services in 2007 and fire services in 2010. Airwave now has a nationwide network of more than 3,000 sites and provides secure voice and data communications to over 300 public safety organisations.
