= Second Verdict =

1976 British television series

- Created by: Troy Kennedy Martin; Elwyn Jones
- Starring: Stratford Johns; Frank Windsor
- Country of origin: United Kingdom
- Original language: English
- No. of episodes: 6

Production
- Running time: 50 minutes

Original release
- Network: BBC1
- Release: 27 May – 1 July 1976

Second Verdict is a six-part BBC television series from 1976. It combines the genres of police procedural and docudrama, with dramatised documentaries in which classic criminal cases and unsolved crimes from history were re-appraised by fictional police officers. In Second Verdict, Stratford Johns and Frank Windsor reprised for a final time their double-act as Detective Chief Superintendents Barlow and Watt, hugely popular with TV audiences from the long-running series Z-Cars, Softly, Softly and Barlow at Large. Second Verdict built on the formula of their 1973 series Jack the Ripper in which dramatised documentary was drawn together with a discussion between the two police officers which formed the narrative. Second Verdict also allowed for some location filming and, when the case being re-appraised was within living memory, interviews with real witnesses.

The episodes were:

- "The Lindbergh Kidnapping" (27 May 1976)
- "Who Killed the Princes in the Tower?" (3 June 1976)
- "The French Bluebeard" (10 June 1976)
- "Murder on the 10.27" (17 June 1976)
- "Lizzie Borden" (24 June 1976)
- "Who Burned the Reichstag?" (1 July 1976).

In 2015 BBC's Genome Blog described Second Verdict as "An odd and jarring mixture of drama and documentary" which "never really excited much interest".

Although this was the last time Barlow and Watt would be seen together on British TV (and the last time Barlow would be seen at all), the Watt character would appear again later in the year in the final series of Softly, Softly: Task Force and then make one final appearance in the last episode of Z-Cars in September 1978.

== Cast ==
- Stratford Johns - (DCS Charlie Barlow)
- Frank Windsor - (DCS John Watt)

== See also ==
- Julian Fellowes Investigates: A Most Mysterious Murder
- Murder, Mystery and My Family
