= Softly, Softly (TV series) =

British TV police procedural drama series (1966–1969)

- Created by: Troy Kennedy Martin
- Starring: Stratford Johns; Frank Windsor
- Country of origin: United Kingdom
- No. of series: 5
- No. of episodes: 120 (81 missing, 2 incomplete) (list of episodes)

Production
- Producers: David Rose; Leonard Lewis
- Running time: 50 minutes

Original release
- Network: BBC1
- Release: 5 January 1966 – 13 November 1969

Softly, Softly is a British television police procedural series produced by the BBC and screened on BBC1 from January 1966. It was created as a spin-off from the series Z-Cars, which ended its fifth series run in December 1965. The series took its title from the proverb "Softly, softly, catchee monkey", the motto of Lancashire Constabulary Training School.

== Series outline ==
Softly, Softly centred on the work of regional police crime squads, plainclothes CID officers based in the fictional region of Wyvern, supposedly in the Bristol area of England. It was designed as a vehicle for Detective Chief Inspector Charles Barlow and Detective Inspector John Watt (played by Stratford Johns and Frank Windsor, respectively) from the police series Z-Cars, which had just finished its original run in December 1965 (no new episodes were produced in 1966 but it was revived in a different format the following year). Joining them in the early series was Robert Keegan as Blackitt, the police station sergeant from Z-Cars, now retired and acting as a freelance helper. Another Z-Cars regular, James Ellis's Bert Lynch, appeared in the 1967 episode "Barlow Was There: Part 3: Mischief". The 1968 episode "Unfinished Business" saw Barlow reunited with his former boss from Z-Cars Detective Chief Superintendent Robins (John Phillips). The first two series continued the trend set by producer David Rose with Z-Cars and transmitted the majority of episodes live. This was one of the last long-running British TV series to do this. From series three onwards all episodes were recorded.

== Theme music ==
The original theme music was, like Z-Cars, a folk-song arrangement by Fritz Spiegl. It was released as a single (credited to the London Waits) on Andrew Loog Oldham's Immediate record label in 1966.

== Series rundown ==
Series	Date from	Date to	Episode count	Duration
1	5 January 1966	29 June 1966	26	50 minutes
2	2 November 1966	31 May 1967	31	50 minutes
3	4 October 1967	4 April 1968	26	50 minutes
4	12 September 1968	13 March 1969	27	50 minutes
5	11 September 1969	13 November 1969	10	50 minutes

== Cast ==
=== Main/regular ===
Actor	Character	Years active	Seasons active	Episode count
Stratford Johns	DCS Charlie Barlow	1966–1969	1–5	91
Frank Windsor	DI/DCI John Watt	1966–1969	1–5	84
Robert Keegan	Mr Bob Blackitt	1966–1967	1–2	42
John Welsh	ACC Bill Calderwood	1966–1967	1–2	24
Garfield Morgan	DCI Gwyn Lewis	1966	1	19
Norman Bowler	DS Harry Hawkins	1966–1969	1–5	75
Gilbert Wynne	DC Reg Dwyer	1966–1967	1–3	43
Cavan Kendall	PC Greenly	1966	1	14
Dan Meaden	DC Ben Box	1966–1968	1–4	49
Eric McCaine	Insp./CI Andy Laird	1966–1969	1–4	18
John Barron	ACC Austin Gilbert	1966–1969	2–5	52
David Quilter	PC Tanner	1966–1968	2–3	29
Chrys Salt	Gwenda Lloyd	1967–1968	3	15
Peggy Sinclair	P/W DS Barbara Allin	1967–1969	3–5	38
Philip Brack	DI Jim Cook	1968–1969	3–5	29
Gavin Campbell	PC/DC William Digby	1968–1969	3–5	25
Howell Evans	DC Davie Morgan	1968–1969	4–5	15

Others

Actor	Character	Years active	Series active	Episode count
Alexis Kanner	DC Matt Stone	1966	1	9
Colin Douglas	DCI Chris Rawlings	1966	1	3
Barry Letts	DS Reed	1966	1	4
Glyn Houston	D Supt Arthur Jones	1966–1969	2, 4	7
Derek Benfield	Palmer, Moxham	1967-1968	2-3	2
Gay Hamilton	Dr Jean Morrow	1969	4–5	5
Walter Gotell	Chief Con. Arthur Cullen	1969	5	1

== Archive status ==
Many of the original Softly, Softly broadcasts are believed lost, especially from the first two series, the majority of which were transmitted live. As a result, 81 episodes are currently missing from the archives and 2 episodes are currently incomplete. (By comparison, all episodes of the follow-up, Taskforce, survive.)

== Reception ==
=== Critical response ===
Jon E. Lewis and Penny Stempel described Softly, Softly and Softly, Softly: Task Force as a "successful" top‑ten spin‑off that "always" delivered "quality scripts", while noting that Barlow's departure left a "disconcerting black hole" at the heart of the series.

== Series and character development ==
In 1969, to coincide with the BBC's move to colour broadcasting on BBC1, Softly Softly ended. The characters of Barlow, Watt and Hawkins were promoted and moved to the Southeast of England in a new series set in the fictitious town of Thamesford. Here, as a result of changes in criminal activities, the police force needed to develop a new approach. Taskforces were set up: these were groupings of police expertise and manpower drawn together for special operations in the region. This was a new series in its own right and it was simply going to be called Taskforce. However, as it starred three strong characters from a popular "brand" that the BBC was reluctant to drop, this new series was retitled Softly, Softly: Task Force.

Stratford Johns left the Taskforce series in 1972 (Barlow had his own spin-off series, Barlow at Large) and it continued until 1976 with Watt in command.

During the '70s Windsor also appeared as Watt in Jack the Ripper, in which he and Barlow reopened the Jack the Ripper murder casebook, and a similar series, Second Verdict, in which they looked into unsolved mysteries and miscarriages of justice.
