= Love in Amsterdam =

Love in Amsterdam may refer to:

- Love in Amsterdam, a.k.a. Death in Amsterdam, a 1962 Van der Valk series novel by Nicolas Freeling
- Amsterdam Affair, a.k.a. Love in Amsterdam, a 1968 British crime film, based on the 1962 novel by Nicolas Freeling
