= Woolgar =

Woolgar is a surname. Notable people with the surname include:

- Fenella Woolgar (born 1969), English actress
- Jack Woolgar (1913–1978), British actor
- Matthew Woolgar (born 1976), English footballer
- Sarah Woolgar (1824–1909), English actress
- Steve Woolgar (born 1950), British sociologist
- Tim Woolgar, British chess boxer
