= List of alumni of the Royal Academy of Dramatic Art =

This is a list of alumni of the Royal Academy of Dramatic Art. It is not exhaustive of all attendees diploma of degree programs at the drama school (not summer courses), only of notable persons who can be reliably sourced as students (most often referenced via RADA's public records).

== A ==
- Marisa Abela (BA Acting 2019)
- Hiran Abeysekera (BA Acting 2011)
- Polly Adams (Acting Diploma 1958)
- Trevor Adams (Acting Diploma 1967)
- Dawn Addams (Acting Diploma 1949)
- Robert Addie (Acting Diploma 1981)
- Mark Addy (Acting Diploma 1984)
- Kay Adshead (Acting Diploma 1975)
- Amber Agar (BA Acting 2002)
- Anthony Ainley (Acting Diploma 1964)
- Yasmine Akram (BA Acting 2007)
- Jude Akuwudike (Acting Diploma 1987)
- Meggie Albanesi (Acting Diploma 1917)
- John Alderton (Acting Diploma 1961)
- Robert Aldous (Acting Diploma 1955)
- Ebrahim Alkazi (Acting Diploma 1950)
- Adie Allen (Acting Diploma 1987)
- Adrianne Allen (Acting Diploma 1926)
- Joy Allen (Acting Diploma 1950)
- Ronald Allen (Acting Diploma 1953)
- Sheila Allen (Acting Diploma 1951)
- Peter Amory (Acting Diploma 1985)
- Jean Anderson (Acting Diploma 1928)
- Miles Anderson (Acting Diploma 1969)
- Bernard Archard (Acting Diploma 1938)
- Jane Arden (Acting Diploma 1946)
- Philip Arditti (BA Acting 2004)
- Graham Armitage (Acting Diploma 1952)
- Jonas Armstrong (BA Acting 2003)
- Linda Armstrong (Acting Diploma 1995)
- John Arnatt (Acting Diploma 1936)
- Gemma Arterton (BA Acting 2007)
- Hannah Arterton (BA Acting 2011)
- Robert Atkins (Acting Diploma 1906)
- Charlotte Attenborough (Acting Diploma 1983)
- Richard Attenborough (Acting Diploma 1942)
- Michael Attwell (Stage Management 1964)

== B ==
- Sarah Badel (Acting Diploma 1961)
- John Bailey (Acting Diploma 1933)
- David Bailie (Acting Diploma 1964)
- Vincent Ball (Acting Diploma 1951)
- Fehinti Balogun (BA Acting 2016)
- David Bamber (Acting Diploma 1979)
- Frith Banbury (Acting Diploma 1933)
- Jack Bardoe (BA Acting 2019)
- Peter Barkworth (Acting Diploma 1948)
- Bruno Barnabe (Acting Diploma 1927)
- Diana Barrington (Acting Diploma 1961)
- John Barron (Acting Diploma 1940)
- George Bartenieff (Acting Diploma 1953)
- Ann Baskett (Acting Diploma 1951)
- Jennifer Bassey (Acting Diploma 1963)
- Alan Bates (Acting Diploma 1954)
- David Battley (Acting Diploma 1959)
- Ciara Baxendale (Acting Foundation 2014)
- Keith Baxter (Acting Diploma 1953)
- Lynsey Baxter (Acting Diploma 1985)
- Trevor Baxter (Acting Diploma 1951)
- Terence Bayler (Acting Diploma 1953)
- Ann Beach (Acting Diploma 1957)
- Stephanie Beacham (Acting Diploma 1967)
- Sean Bean (Acting Diploma 1983)
- Stephen Beckett (Acting Diploma 1990)
- Richard Beckinsale (Acting Diploma 1968)
- Tony Beckley (Acting Diploma 1952)
- Brian Bedford (Acting Diploma 1955)
- Christopher Beeny (Acting Diploma 1959)
- Paudge Behan (Acting Diploma 1990)
- Mary Hayley Bell (Acting Diploma 1933)
- Derek Benfield (Acting Diploma 1949)
- Christopher Benjamin (Acting Diploma 1958)
- Colin Bennett (Acting Diploma 1973)
- Edward Bennett (BA Acting 2004)
- Hywel Bennett (Acting Diploma 1964)
- Jill Bennett (Acting Diploma 1945)
- John Bennett (Acting Diploma 1953)
- Louise Bennett-Coverley (Acting Diploma 1946)
- Pippa Bennett-Warner (BA Acting 2010)
- George Benson (Acting Diploma 1930)
- Mark Benton (Acting Diploma 1990)
- Michael Benz (BA Acting 2007)
- Stephen Beresford (Acting Diploma 1994)
- Sia Berkeley (BA Acting 2006)
- Eric Berry (Acting Diploma 1933)
- Eve Best (Acting Diploma 1999)
- Kirsty Besterman (BA Acting 2002)
- Val Bettin (Acting Diploma 1951)
- Rodney Bewes (Acting Diploma 1956)
- Christopher H. Bidmead (Acting Diploma 1962)
- Isabel Bigley (Acting Diploma 1948)
- Theodore Bikel (Acting Diploma 1948)
- Leo Bill (Acting Diploma 2001)
- Pepper Binkley (BA Acting 2004)
- Norman Bird (Acting Diploma 1943)
- Nora Francisca Blackburne (Acting Diploma 1936)
- Adam Blackwood (Acting Diploma 1981)
- Isla Blair (Acting Diploma 1963)
- Arthur Blake (Acting Diploma 1954)
- Michael Blakemore (Acting Diploma 1952)
- Caroline Blakiston (Acting Diploma 1957)
- JB Blanc (Acting Diploma 1990)
- Joyce Bland (Acting Diploma 1927)
- Peter Blythe (Acting Diploma 1958)
- Ross Boatman (Acting Diploma 1986)
- Ken Bones (Acting Diploma 1973)
- Oliver Boot (Acting Diploma 2001)
- James Booth (Acting Diploma 1956)
- Annika Boras (BA Acting 2005)
- Bruce Bould (Acting Diploma 1969)
- Peter Bowles (Acting Diploma 1956)
- Margot Boyd (Acting Diploma 1933)
- David Bradley (Acting Diploma 1968)
- Booker Bradshaw (Acting Diploma 1964)
- Hilda Braid (Acting Diploma 1948)
- Gina Bramhill (BA Acting 2009)
- Kenneth Branagh (Acting Diploma 1981)
- Bernard Bresslaw (Acting Diploma 1953)
- Alan Bridges (Acting Diploma 1948)
- Anita Briem (BA Acting 2004)
- Richard Briers (Acting Diploma 1956)
- Francine Brody (Acting Diploma 1983)
- Faith Brook (Acting Diploma 1942)
- Sian Brooke (BA Acting 2002)
- Jacqueline Brookes (Acting Diploma 1953)
- Sally Brophy (Acting Diploma 1949)
- Arthur Brough (Acting Diploma 1928)
- Pamela Brown (Acting Diploma 1936)
- Angela Browne (Acting Diploma 1955)
- Tom Browne (Acting)
- Dugald Bruce Lockhart (Acting Diploma 1994)
- Joshua Bryant (Acting Diploma 1964)
- Andrew Buchan (BA Acting 2005)
- Jessie Buckley (BA Acting 2013)
- Kate Buffery (Acting Diploma 1979)
- Suzanne Burden (Acting Diploma 1979)
- John Burgess (Acting Diploma 1954)
- Alfred Burke (Acting Diploma 1939)
- David Burke (Acting Diploma 1960)
- Tom Burke (BA Acting 2002)
- Edward Burnham (Acting Diploma 1938)
- Lorraine Burroughs (BA Acting 2003)
- Kezia Burrows (BA Acting 2004)
- David Burt (Acting Diploma 1973)
- Donald Burton (Acting Diploma 1958)
- Anthony Bushell (Acting Diploma 1926)
- David Butler (Acting Diploma 1953)
- Neville Buswell (Acting Diploma 1964)
- Chanya Button (MA Theatre Directing 2010)
- Barbara Bryne (Acting Diploma 1947)

== C ==
- Jennifer Calvert (Acting Diploma 1985)
- Adam Campbell (BA Acting 2004)
- Ken Campbell (Acting Diploma 1961)
- Nicholas Campbell (Acting)
- Phoebe Campbell (BA Acting 2022)
- Jessica Capshaw (Acting)
- John Carlisle (Acting Diploma 1958)
- Kitty Carlisle (Acting)
- Ian Carmichael (Acting Diploma 1941, left)
- Michael Carter (Acting Diploma 1969)
- Pip Carter (BA Acting 2006)
- Paul Carson (Acting Diploma 1961)
- Peter Cartwright (Acting Diploma 1961)
- Bertie Carvel (BA Acting 2003)
- John Castle (Acting Diploma 1964)
- John Cater (Acting Diploma 1953)
- Katy Cavanagh (Acting Diploma 1995)
- Antoinette Cellier (Acting Diploma 1933)
- Lolita Chakrabarti (Acting Diploma 1990)
- John Chandos (Acting Diploma 1938)
- Oona Chaplin (BA Acting 2007)
- John Chapman (Acting Diploma 1950)
- Paul Chapman (Acting Diploma 1959)
- Jan Chappell (Acting Diploma 1964)
- Maria Charles (Acting Diploma 1946)
- Stephan Chase (Acting Diploma 1967)
- Heather Chasen (Acting Diploma 1944)
- Tom Chatto (Acting)
- Tsai Chin (Acting Diploma 1956)
- Dennis Chinnery (Acting Diploma 1949)
- Erik Chitty (Acting Diploma 1933)
- Chipo Chung (BA Acting 2003)
- Diana Churchill (Acting Diploma 1932)
- Diane Cilento (Acting Diploma 1952)
- Diane Clare (Acting Diploma 1955)
- Susan Clark (Acting Diploma 1962)
- Nicholas Clay (Acting Diploma 1968)
- Charlie Clements (MA Theatre Lab 2014)
- Carol Cleveland (Acting Diploma 1963)
- Sian Clifford (BA Acting 2006)
- Peter Coke (Acting Diploma 1935)
- Olivia Cole (Acting Diploma 1964)
- Noel Coleman (Acting Diploma 1941)
- Richard Coleman (Acting Diploma 1953)
- Charles Collingwood (Acting Diploma 1965)
- Joan Collins (Acting Diploma 1951)
- John D. Collins (Acting Diploma 1963)
- Christopher Colquhoun (Acting Diploma 1992)
- Jarlath Conroy (Acting Diploma 1971)
- David Cook (Acting Diploma 1961)
- Georgina Cookson (Acting Diploma 1938)
- Saffron Coomber (BA Acting 2018)
- Daisy May Cooper (BA Acting 2010)
- Stuart Cooper (Acting Diploma 1963)
- Lu Corfield (BA Acting 2003)
- James Cossins (Acting Diploma 1951)
- Nicolas Coster (Acting Diploma 1951)
- Matthew Cottle (Acting Diploma 1990)
- Tom Courtenay (Acting Diploma 1960)
- Elliot Cowan (Acting Diploma 2001)
- Brenda Cowling (Acting Diploma 1949)
- Jonny Coyne (Acting Diploma 1983)
- Lauren Crace (BA Acting 2008)
- Kenneth Cranham (Acting Diploma 1966)
- Lorcan Cranitch (Acting Diploma 1982)
- Anthony Creighton (Acting Diploma 1948)
- Don Crosby (Acting Diploma 1949)
- Ben Cross (Acting Diploma 1972)
- Ian Cullen (Acting Diploma 1958)
- Roland Culver (Acting Diploma 1926)
- David Cunliffe (Acting Diploma 1953)
- Patricia Cutts (Acting Diploma 1943)

== D ==
- Billy Dainty (Acting Diploma 1945)
- Audrey Dalton (Acting Diploma 1952)
- Timothy Dalton (Acting Diploma 1966)
- Siobhan Daly
- Leora Dana (Acting Diploma 1948)
- Paul Daneman (Acting Diploma 1949)
- Josie D'Arby (Acting Diploma 1995)
- Paul Darrow (Acting Diploma 1962)
- Arthur Darvill (BA Acting 2006)
- Lucy Davenport (Acting Diploma 1999)
- Deddie Davies (Acting Diploma 1958)
- Lynette Davies (Acting Diploma 1969)
- Petra Davies (Acting Diploma 1949)
- Pamela Ann Davy (Acting Diploma 1960)
- Robert Daws (Acting Diploma 1979)
- David Dawson (BA Acting 2005)
- Kiza Deen (Acting Degree 2012)
- Jamie de Courcey (Acting Diploma 1998)
- Edward de Souza (Acting Diploma 1957)
- Francis de Wolff (Acting Diploma 1935)
- Aimée Delamain (Acting Diploma 1931)
- Mark Denham (Acting Diploma 1997)
- Peter Dennis (Acting)
- Elisabeth Dermot-Walsh (Acting Diploma 1997)
- Pauline Devaney (Acting Diploma 1964)
- Mark Dexter (Acting Diploma 1995)
- Arnold Diamond (Acting Diploma 1936)
- Peter Diamond (Acting Diploma 1951)
- Richard Digby Day (Directing Certificate 1963)
- Frank Dillane (BA Acting 2013)
- Lisa Dillon (BA Acting 2002)
- Adele Dixon (Acting Diploma 1926)
- Joe Dixon (Acting Diploma 1987)
- Richard Dormer (Acting Diploma 1991)
- Roy Dotrice (Acting Diploma 1947)
- Donald Douglas (Acting Diploma 1959)
- Robert Douglas (Acting Diploma 1928)
- Shirley Douglas (Acting Diploma 1954)
- Fabia Drake (Acting Diploma 1923)
- Gabrielle Drake (Acting Diploma 1964)
- Amanda Drew (Acting Diploma 1992)
- James Dreyfus (Acting Diploma 1990)
- Duncan Duff (Acting Diploma 1987)
- Elizabeth Dulau (Acting Diploma 2020)
- Ian Dunnett Jnr (Acting Diploma 2020)
- Joanna Dunham (Acting Diploma 1958)
- Nick Dunning (Acting Diploma 1977)
- Noel Dyson (Acting Diploma 1938)

== E ==
- Adetomiwa Edun (BA Acting 2008)
- Alan Edwards (Acting Diploma 1944)
- Peter Egan (Acting Diploma 1966)
- Taron Egerton (BA Acting 2012)
- Lisa Eichhorn (Acting Diploma 1977)
- Xanthe Elbrick
- Denholm Elliott (Acting Diploma 1942, left)
- Harry Elton (Acting Diploma 1953)
- Barry England (Acting Diploma 1954)
- Robert Englund (Acting – American branch)
- Brian Epstein (Acting Diploma 1957)
- Cynthia Erivo (BA Acting 2010)
- Jill Esmond (Acting Diploma 1926)
- Clifford Evans (Acting Diploma 1932)
- Edith Evans (Acting Diploma 1926)
- Tenniel Evans (Acting Diploma 1951)
- Trevor Eve (Acting Diploma 1973)
- Barbara Ewing (Acting Diploma 1965)

== F ==
- O. T. Fagbenle (Acting Diploma 2001)
- David Fahm (Acting Diploma 1995)
- Christopher Fairbank (Acting Diploma 1974)
- Moris Farhi (Acting Diploma 1956)
- Suzanne Farrington (Acting Diploma 1953)
- Patsy Ferran (BA Acting 2014)
- Ralph Fiennes (Acting Diploma 1985)
- Frank Finlay (Acting Diploma 1955)
- Albert Finney (Acting Diploma 1956)
- Martin Fisk (Acting Diploma 1971)
- Walter Fitzgerald (Acting Diploma 1923)
- Ian Fitzgibbon (Acting Diploma 1987)
- Rory Fleck Byrne (BA Acting 2010)
- Susan Fleetwood (Acting Diploma 1964)
- Diane Fletcher (Acting Diploma 1966)
- June Flewett (Acting Diploma 1947)
- Theodore J. Flicker (Acting Diploma 1952)
- Daniel Flynn (Acting Diploma 1982)
- Eric Flynn (Acting Diploma 1959)
- Lillian Fontaine
- Bryan Forbes (Acting Diploma 1944)
- Louise Ford (BA Acting 2007)
- John Forgeham (Acting Diploma 1963)
- Brigit Forsyth (Acting Diploma 1960)
- Derek Fowlds (Acting Diploma 1960)
- Edward Fox (Acting Diploma 1959)
- Laurence Fox (Acting Diploma 2001)
- Phoebe Fox (BA Acting 2010)
- Rosemary Frankau (Acting Diploma 1953)
- Richard Franklin (Acting Diploma 1965)
- John Franklyn-Robbins (Acting Diploma 1949)
- Helen Fraser (Acting Diploma 1960)
- Ronald Fraser (Acting Diploma 1953)
- Naomi Frederick (Acting Diploma 2001)
- Jonathan Frid (Acting Diploma 1949)
- Joel Fry (BA Acting 2005)
- Vera Fusek (Acting Diploma 1952)

== G ==
- Craig Gallivan (BA Acting 2005)
- Michael Gambon (Acting)
- Eric Gandar Dower (Acting)
- Reginald Gardiner (Acting Diploma 1924)
- Patricia Garwood (Acting Diploma 1959)
- Valerie Gaunt (Acting Diploma 1951)
- William Gaunt (Acting)
- Talitha Getty (Acting Diploma 1960)
- John Gielgud (Acting Diploma 1925)
- Adam Gillen (BA Acting 2007)
- Robert Gillespie (Acting Diploma 1953)
- Aden Gillett (Acting Diploma 1984)
- Sheila Gish (Acting Diploma 1962)
- Gerard Glaister (Acting Diploma 1936)
- Iain Glen (Acting Diploma 1985)
- Julian Glover (Acting Diploma 1954)
- John Golightly (Acting Diploma 1964)
- Henry Goodman (Acting Diploma 1971)
- Ilan Goodman (BA Acting 2007)
- Harold Goodwin (Acting Diploma 1947)
- Bob Goody (Acting Diploma 1975)
- Noele Gordon (Acting Diploma 1936)
- Serena Gordon (Acting Diploma 1985)
- Julia Goulding (BA Acting 2011)
- Colin Graham (Acting Diploma 1952)
- Denys Graham (Acting Diploma 1951)
- Dolores Gray (Acting Diploma 1947)
- Elspet Gray (Acting Diploma 1947)
- Eva Gray (BA Acting)
- Trystan Gravelle (BA Acting 2003)
- Garard Green (Acting Diploma 1949)
- Nigel Green (Acting)
- Richard Greenblatt (Acting Diploma 1974)
- Joan Greenwood (Acting Diploma 1938)
- Stephen Greif (Acting Diploma 1967)
- Clinton Greyn (Acting Diploma 1957)
- Hugh Griffith (Acting Diploma 1939)
- Paul Grist (Acting Diploma 1960)
- James Grout (Acting Diploma 1950)
- Ioan Gruffudd (Acting Diploma 1995)
- Nicky Guadagni (Acting Diploma 1974)
- Pippa Guard (Acting Diploma 1975)
- Peter Gunn (Acting Diploma 1985)

== H ==
- Mark Hadfield (Acting Diploma 1981)
- Uta Hagen (Acting)
- Stephen Haggard (Acting Diploma 1933)
- Amanda Hale (BA Acting 2005)
- Georgina Hale (Acting Diploma 1965)
- John Hallam (Acting Diploma 1964)
- Peter Halliday (Acting Diploma 1949)
- David Halliwell (Acting Diploma 1961)
- Kenneth Halliwell (Acting Diploma 1953)
- Emma Hamilton (BA Acting 2007)
- Kay Hammond (Acting Diploma 1928)
- Mona Hammond (Acting Diploma 1964)
- Roger Hammond (Acting Diploma 1963)
- Sheila Hancock (Acting Diploma 1952)
- Terry Hands (Acting Diploma 1964)
- Bryony Hannah (BA Acting 2008)
- Hermione Hannen (Acting Diploma 1933)
- Jerry Hardin (Acting Diploma 1953)
- Cedric Hardwicke (Acting)
- Edward Hardwicke (Acting Diploma 1953)
- David Harewood (Acting Diploma 1987)
- Christine Hargreaves (Acting Diploma 1958)
- Gerald Harper (Acting Diploma 1951)
- Davyd Harries (Acting Diploma 1958)
- Rosemary Harris (Acting Diploma 1952)
- Kathleen Harrison (Acting Diploma 1927)
- Lisa Harrow (Acting Diploma 1968)
- Laurence Harvey (Acting Diploma 1946)
- Ronald Harwood (Acting Diploma 1953)
- Victoria Harwood (Acting Diploma 1990)
- Veslemøy Haslund (Acting Diploma 1959)
- Nyasha Hatendi (BA Acting 2004)
- Jeremy Hawk (Acting)
- Sally Hawkins (Acting Diploma 1998)
- Daniel Hawksford (Acting Diploma 2001)
- Patricia Hayes (Acting Diploma 1928)
- James Hayter (Acting Diploma 1926)
- Sam Hazeldine (Acting Diploma 1994, left 1993)
- James Healey (Acting Diploma 1977)
- Rob Heanley (BA Acting 2003)
- Annie Hemingway (BA Acting 2007)
- Lindy Hemming (Costumes 1970)
- Nick Hendrix (BA Acting 2010)
- Janet Henfrey (Acting Diploma 1959)
- Del Henney (Acting Diploma 1965)
- Guy Henry (Acting Diploma 1981)
- Nicky Henson (Stage Management)
- Harry Hepple (BA Acting 2006)
- Percy Herbert (Acting Diploma 1950)
- Donald Hewlett (Acting Diploma 1947)
- Sherrie Hewson (Acting Diploma 1971)
- Edward Hibbert (Acting Diploma 1977)
- Tom Hiddleston (BA Acting 2005)
- Errol Hill (Acting Diploma 1951)
- Jacqueline Hill (Acting Diploma 1951)
- Melanie Hill (Acting Diploma 1983)
- James Hillier (Acting Diploma 1998)
- Ciarán Hinds (Acting Diploma 1975)
- Geoffrey Hinsliff (Acting Diploma 1960)
- Pat Hitchcock (Acting Diploma 1950)
- Seline Hizli (BA Acting 2010)
- Carleton Hobbs (Acting Diploma 1924)
- Douglas Hodge (Acting Diploma 1981)
- Edward Hogg (BA Acting 2002)
- Joseph Holland (Acting Diploma 1933)
- John Hollingworth (BA Acting 2008)
- Ian Holm (Acting Diploma 1953)
- Sean Holmes (MA Text and Performance)
- Thelma Holt (Acting Diploma 1952)
- Ewan Hooper (Acting Diploma 1957)
- Anna Hope (Acting Diploma 2001)
- William Hope (Acting Diploma 1977)
- Anthony Hopkins (Acting Diploma 1963)
- John Hopkins (Acting Diploma 2000)
- Lizzie Hopley (Acting Diploma 1996)
- Gerard Horan (Acting Diploma 1983)
- Jane Horrocks (Acting Diploma 1985)
- Basil Hoskins (Acting Diploma 1949)
- Robin Houston (Stage Management Diploma 1968)
- Joyce Howard (Acting Diploma 1941)
- Trevor Howard (Acting Diploma 1934)
- Martha Howe-Douglas (BA Acting 2003)
- Gerran Howell (Acting)
- Elizabeth Hubbard (Acting Diploma 1957)
- Kirsten Hughes (Acting Diploma 1983)
- Tom Hughes (BA Acting 2008)
- Benita Hume (Acting Diploma 1925)
- Kathryn Hunter (Acting Diploma 1981)
- Richard Hurndall (Acting Diploma 1929)
- Veronica Hurst (Acting Diploma 1950)
- John Hurt (Acting Diploma 1962)
- Geoffrey Hutchings (Acting Diploma 1963)
- Jasmine Hyde (Acting Diploma 2000)
- Jonathan Hyde (Acting Diploma 1972)
- Wilfrid Hyde-White (Acting Diploma 1923)
- Frances Hyland (Acting, left)

== I ==
- Kenneth Ives (Acting Diploma 1964)

== J ==
- Glenda Jackson (Acting Diploma 1956)
- Inigo Jackson (Acting Diploma 1961)
- Madhur Jaffrey (Acting Diploma 1957)
- Emrys James (Acting Diploma 1954)
- Peter Francis James (Acting Diploma 1977)
- Polly James (Acting Diploma 1964)
- Louise Jameson (Acting Diploma 1971)
- Mette Janson (Acting Diploma 1955)
- Frank Jarvis (Acting Diploma 1961)
- Martin Jarvis (Acting Diploma 1962)
- Neville Jason (Acting Diploma 1956)
- Thusitha Jayasundera (Acting Diploma 1993)
- Marianne Jean-Baptiste (Acting Diploma 1990)
- Barbara Jefford (Acting Diploma 1949)
- Lionel Jeffries (Acting Diploma 1949)
- Dominic Jephcott (Acting Diploma 1975)
- Ivanno Jeremiah (BA Acting 2010)
- Mervyn Johns (Acting Diploma 1924)
- Celia Johnson (Acting Diploma 1929)
- Richard Johnson (Acting Diploma 1944)
- Margaret Johnston (Acting Diploma 1937)
- Gemma Jones (Acting Diploma 1962)
- Griffith Jones (Acting Diploma 1932)
- Ken Jones (Acting Diploma 1959)
- Maggie Jones (Acting Diploma 1954)
- Nicholas Jones (Stage Management 1964)
- Ursula Jones (Acting Diploma 1959)
- David Jonsson (BA Acting 2016)
- Yootha Joyce (Acting Diploma 1946)
- John Justin (Acting Diploma 1939)

== K ==
- Bob Kaliban (Acting Diploma 1957)
- Miriam Karlin (Acting Diploma 1946)
- Kostas Karras (Acting)
- Xenia Kalogeropoulou (Acting Diploma 1956)
- Charles Kay (Acting Diploma 1957)
- Geoffrey Keen (Acting Diploma 1936)
- Katherine Kelly (Acting Diploma 2001)
- Rachel Kempson (Acting Diploma 1933)
- James Kemsley (Acting)
- Gwyneth Keyworth (BA Acting 2014)
- Alex Kingston (Acting Diploma 1985)
- Antonia Kinlay (BA Acting 2008)
- Roy Kinnear (Acting Diploma 1955)
- Ian Kirkby (Acting Diploma 1992)
- Nigel Kneale (Acting Diploma 1969)
- Joseph Kloska (BA Acting 2006)
- Terence Knapp (Acting Diploma 1954)
- Nigel Kneale (Acting)
- Patricia Kneale (Acting Diploma 1947)
- Matt William Knowles (MA Acting 2018)
- Estelle Kohler (Acting Diploma 1965)
- Wendy Kweh (Acting Diploma 1999)

== L ==
- Lynda La Plante (Acting Diploma 1962)
- Alan Lake (Acting Diploma 1961)
- Ben Lamb (BA Acting 2010)
- Nigel Lambert (Acting Diploma 1963)
- Duncan Lamont (Acting Diploma 1937)
- Pascal Langdale (Acting Diploma 1996)
- Alex Lanipekun (BA Acting 2007, left)
- James Larkin (Acting Diploma 1985)
- Jack Laskey (BA Acting 2003)
- Michael Latimer (Acting Diploma 1962)
- Charles Laughton (Acting Diploma 1926)
- Tamara Lawrance (BA Acting 2015)
- Delphi Lawrence (Acting Diploma 1949)
- Leigh Lawson (Acting Diploma 1969)
- George Layton (Acting Diploma 1962)
- Nicholas Le Prevost (Acting Diploma 1973)
- Rosemary Leach (Acting Diploma 1955)
- David Learner (Acting Diploma 1975)
- Martin Ledwith (Acting Diploma 1996)
- Belinda Lee (Acting Diploma 1953)
- Bernard Lee
- John Leeson (Acting Diploma 1964)
- Beatrix Lehmann (Acting Diploma 1924)
- Adele Leigh (Acting Diploma 1946)
- Mike Leigh (Acting Diploma 1962)
- Vivien Leigh (Acting Diploma 1934)
- Anton Lesser (Acting Diploma 1977)
- Adrian Lester (Acting Diploma 1989)
- Adam Levy (Acting Diploma 1994)
- Lorna Lewis (Acting Diploma 1962)
- Andrew Lincoln (Acting Diploma 1994)
- Henry Lincoln (Acting Diploma 1952)
- Robert Lindsay (Acting Diploma 1970)
- Marjorie Linklater (Acting)
- Richard Lintern (Acting Diploma 1987)
- Larry Linville (Acting Diploma 1961)
- Joan Littlewood (Acting Diploma 1933, left)
- Desmond Llewelyn (Acting Diploma 1937)
- Roger Llewellyn (Acting Diploma 1972)
- Bernard Lloyd (Acting Diploma 1961)
- Charles Lloyd-Pack (Acting Diploma 1925)
- Roger Lloyd-Pack (Acting Diploma 1965)
- Philip Locke (Acting Diploma 1950)
- Margaret Lockwood (Acting Diploma 1934)
- Dyson Lovell (Acting Diploma 1958)
- Emma Lowndes (Acting Diploma 2000)
- Philip Lowrie (Acting Diploma 1958)
- Charlotte Lucas (Acting Diploma 2001)
- Ida Lupino (Acting Diploma 1934)
- Richard Lupino (Acting Diploma 1945)

== M ==
- Polly Maberly (Acting Diploma 1998)
- Matthew Macfadyen (Acting Diploma 1995)
- Fulton Mackay (Acting Diploma 1948)
- Edward MacLiam (Acting Diploma 2001)
- Meredith MacNeill (Acting Diploma 2001)
- Ciaran Madden (Acting Diploma 1967)
- Victor Maddern (Acting Diploma 1949)
- Ashley Madekwe (BA Acting 2005)
- Philip Madoc (Acting Diploma 1959)
- Ruth Madoc (Acting Diploma 1961)
- Melissanthi Mahut (BA Acting 2012)
- Constance Malleson (Acting)
- Miles Malleson (Acting)
- Stephen Mangan (Acting Diploma 1994)
- Clive Mantle (Acting Diploma 1980)
- Kate Maravan (Acting Diploma 1993)
- David March (Acting Diploma 1944)
- Howard Marion-Crawford (Acting Diploma 1934)
- William Marlowe (Acting Diploma 1959)
- Anthony Marreco (Acting)
- Roy Marsden (Acting Diploma 1940)
- Bryan Marshall (Acting Diploma 1963)
- Nathaniel Martello-White (BA Acting 2006)
- Gregory Paul Martin (Acting Diploma 1977)
- Shereen Martineau (BA Acting 2002)
- Patrice Martinez (Acting Diploma 1984)
- Stefanie Martini (BA Acting 2015)
- Clelia Matania (Acting Diploma)
- Carmen Mathews (Acting Diploma 1935)
- Brian Matthew (Acting Diploma 1950)
- Sinead Matthews (BA Acting 2003)
- Michael Matus (Acting Diploma 1989)
- Sharon Maughan (Acting Diploma 1971)
- Toralv Maurstad (Acting Diploma 1949)
- Dora Mavor Moore (Acting Diploma 1912)
- Lois Maxwell (Acting Diploma 1945)
- Anthony May (Acting Diploma 1967)
- Daniel Mays (Acting Diploma 2000)
- Gugu Mbatha-Raw (BA Acting 2004)
- Aidan McArdle (Acting Diploma 1996)
- James McArdle (BA Acting 2010)
- Richard McCabe (Acting Diploma 1980)
- David McCallum (Acting Diploma 1951)
- John McCallum (Acting Diploma 1938)
- Alec McCowen (Acting Diploma 1943)
- Michael McElhatton (Acting Diploma 1987)
- Steve McFadden (Acting Diploma 1987)
- Paul McGann (Acting Diploma 1981)
- Kitty McGeever (Acting Diploma 1996)
- Melinda McGraw (Acting Diploma 1986)
- Joshua McGuire (BA Acting 2010)
- Christian McKay (Acting Diploma 2001)
- Don McKillop (Acting Diploma 1960)
- Mairead McKinley (Acting Diploma 1993)
- Tim McMullan (Acting Diploma 1989)
- Kevin McNally (Acting Diploma 1975)
- Ian McShane (Acting Diploma 1962)
- Janet McTeer (Acting Diploma 1983)
- Harry Meacher (Acting Diploma 1967)
- Jonathan Meades (Acting Diploma 1969)
- Beryl Measor (Acting Diploma 1931)
- Tobias Menzies (Acting Diploma 1998)
- Freddie Meredith (BA Acting 2015)
- Jane Merrow (Acting Diploma 1960)
- Sally Messham (Acting Diploma 2015)
- Dido Miles (Acting Diploma 1993)
- Sarah Miles (Acting Diploma 1960)
- Maggie Millar (Acting)
- Roger Milner (Acting Diploma 1948)
- Warren Mitchell (Acting Diploma 1949)
- Donald Moffat (Acting Diploma 1954)
- Zia Mohyeddin (Acting Diploma 1954)
- Zakes Mokae (Acting)
- Gerard Monaco (BA Acting 2002)
- Bruce Montague (Acting Diploma 1956)
- Tanya Moodie (Acting Diploma 1993)
- Roger Moore (Acting Diploma 1945)
- Tedde Moore (Acting Diploma 1967)
- Pauline Moran (Acting Diploma 1972)
- Terence Morgan (Acting Diploma 1942)
- Robert Morley (Acting Diploma 1928)
- Aubrey Morris (Acting Diploma 1944)
- Mary Morris (Acting Diploma 1935)
- Wolfe Morris (Acting Diploma 1943)
- David Morrissey (Acting Diploma 1985)
- Barry Morse (Acting Diploma 1936)
- Hayward Morse (Acting Diploma 1967)
- Melanie Morse (Acting Diploma 1967)
- Caroline Mortimer (Acting Diploma 1960)
- Clive Morton (Acting Diploma 1928)
- Wunmi Mosaku (BA Acting 2007)
- Patrick Mower (Acting Diploma 1962)
- Pete Murray (Acting Diploma 1944)
- Stephen Murray (Acting Diploma 1933)
- Corey Mylchreest (BA Acting 2020)

== N ==
- Adam Nagaitis (BA Acting 2012)
- Alan Napier (Acting Diploma 1925)
- Hildegarde Neil (Acting Diploma 1963)
- Derren Nesbitt (Acting Diploma 1954)
- John Neville (Acting Diploma 1948)
- Chris New (BA Acting 2006)
- Derek Newark (Acting Diploma 1960)
- Patrick Newell (Acting Diploma 1954)
- Nanette Newman (Acting Diploma 1952)
- Robert Nichols (Acting Diploma 1948)
- Sue Nicholls (Acting Diploma 1963)
- Carli Norris (Acting Diploma 1997)
- Dean Norris (Acting Diploma 1987)
- Rufus Norris (Acting Diploma 1989)
- James Norton (BA Acting 2010, left after 2007–2010)
- Pat Nye (Acting Diploma 1933)

== O ==
- Kathy Rose O'Brien (BA Acting 2006)
- Patrick O'Connell (Acting Diploma 1957)
- Joseph O'Conor (Acting Diploma 1940)
- Kate O'Flynn (BA Acting 2006)
- Ian Ogilvy (Acting Diploma 1968)
- Fredrik Ohlsson (Acting Diploma 1957)
- Sophie Okonedo (Acting Diploma 1990)
- Ursula O'Leary (Stage Management Diploma 1948)
- Hannah Onslow (BA Acting 2019)
- Joe Orton (Acting Diploma 1953)
- Rob Ostlere (BA Acting 2008)
- Peter O'Toole (Acting Diploma 1955)
- Clive Owen (Acting Diploma 1986)
- Lloyd Owen (Acting Diploma 1987)
- Reginald Owen (Acting Diploma 1908)
- Sofia Oxenham (BA Acting 2017)

== P ==
- Joanna Page (Acting Diploma 1998)
- Nicola Pagett (Acting Diploma 1964)
- Anna Palk (Acting Diploma 1961)
- Adrian Pang (Acting)
- Robin Pappas (Acting Diploma 1974)
- Judy Parfitt (Acting Diploma 1953)
- Diane Parish (Acting Diploma 1991)
- Jamie Parker (BA Acting 2002)
- Shaun Parkes (Acting Diploma 1994)
- Wenda Parkinson (left early to act)
- George Pastell (Acting Diploma 1949)
- Bruce Payne (Acting Diploma 1981)
- Maxine Peake (Acting Diploma 1998)
- Jacqueline Pearce (Acting Diploma 1963)
- Eve Pearce (Acting Diploma 1950)
- Lennard Pearce (Acting)
- David Peel (Acting)
- Nicholas Pennell (Acting Diploma 1960)
- Daniel Percival (BA Acting 2005)
- Barbara Perry (Acting Diploma 1948)
- Jimmy Perry (Acting Diploma 1949)
- Shauneille Perry (Acting Diploma 1955)
- Jon Pertwee (Acting Diploma 1939, left 1939)
- Conrad Phillips (Acting Diploma 1947)
- Jonny Phillips (Acting Diploma 1983)
- Siân Phillips (Acting Diploma 1956)
- Jennifer Phipps (Acting Diploma 1951)
- Rachel Pickup (Acting Diploma 1995)
- Ronald Pickup (Acting Diploma 1964)
- Rebecca Pidgeon (Acting Diploma 1986)
- David Pinner (Acting Diploma 1960)
- Harold Pinter (Acting Diploma 1949)
- Nigel Pivaro (Acting Diploma 1981)
- Tony Plana (Acting)
- Angela Pleasence (Acting Diploma 1963)
- Patricia Plunkett (Acting Diploma 1945)
- Nina Polan (Acting Diploma 1948)
- Abraham Popoola (BA Acting 2016)
- Bo Poraj (Acting Diploma 1995)
- Lindsay Posner (Acting Diploma 1984)
- Elizabeth Power (Acting Diploma 1966)
- Duncan Preston (Acting Diploma 1969)
- Sarah Preston (Acting Diploma 1994)
- Brendan Price (Acting Diploma 1970)
- Bryan Pringle (Acting Diploma 1955)
- Tom Prior (BA Acting 2012)
- Jonathan Pryce (Acting Diploma 1971)
- Bruce Purchase (Acting Diploma 1962)
- Koel Purie (BA Acting 2002)
- Paul Pyant (Stage Electrics and Lighting Design Diploma 1973)
- Frederick Pyne (Acting Diploma 1962)

== Q ==
- John Quarmby (Acting Diploma 1951)
- Anna Quayle (Acting Diploma 1957)
- Anthony Quayle (Acting Diploma 1933)

== R ==
- Basil Radford (Acting Diploma 1923)
- Jessica Raine (BA Acting 2008)
- Jenny Rainsford (BA Acting 2011)
- Priya Rajvansh (Acting Diploma 1958)
- Giles Ramsay
- Louie Ramsay (Acting Diploma 1950)
- Robin Ramsay (Acting Diploma 1957)
- Mary Jo Randle (Acting Diploma 1981)
- Devika Rani (Acting)
- Robin Ray (Acting Diploma 1952)
- Gary Raymond (Acting Diploma 1955)
- Ian Reddington (Acting Diploma 1978)
- Joyce Redman (Acting Diploma 1936)
- Robert Reed (Acting)
- Llewellyn Rees (Acting Diploma 1928)
- Anne Reid (Acting Diploma 1955)
- Jessica Revell (BA Acting 2023)
- Jean Rhys (Acting)
- Matthew Rhys (Acting Diploma 1996)
- Paul Rhys (Acting Diploma 1985)
- John Rhys-Davies (Acting Diploma 1962)
- Georgina Rich (BA Acting 2004)
- Angela Richards (Acting Diploma 1964)
- Joely Richardson (Acting Diploma 1985)
- Alan Rickman (Acting Diploma 1974)
- Daniel Rigby (BA Acting 2004)
- Terence Rigby (Acting Diploma 1960)
- Diana Rigg (Acting Diploma 1957)
- David Rintoul (Acting Diploma 1971)
- Andrea Riseborough (BA Acting 2005)
- June Ritchie (Acting Diploma 1961)
- Simon Rivers (BA Acting 2007)
- Alexandra Roach (BA Acting 2010)
- Christopher Robbie (Acting Diploma 1960)
- Amy Robbins (Acting Diploma 1996)
- Rachel Roberts (Acting Diploma 1950)
- Joe Robinson (Acting Diploma 1948)
- Rowan Robinson (BA Acting 2022)
- Flora Robson (Acting Diploma 1922)
- Simon Robson (Acting Diploma 1992)
- Patricia Roc (Acting Diploma 1936)
- Laura Rogers (Acting Diploma 2000)
- Edina Ronay (Acting Diploma 1963)
- Hugh Ross (Acting Diploma 1968)
- Joanna Roth (Acting Diploma 1987)
- Derek Royle (Acting Diploma 1950)
- Myles Rudge (Acting Diploma 1949)
- Sophie Rundle (BA Acting 2011)
- David Ryall (Acting Diploma 1964)
- Amanda Ryan (Acting Diploma 1995)
- Danielle Ryan (BA Acting 2006)
- Juliet Rylance (BA Acting 2002)
- Mark Rylance (Acting Diploma 1980)

== S ==
- Robin Sachs (Acting Diploma 1971)
- Peter Sallis (Acting Diploma 1948)
- Antonia de Sancha (Acting Diploma 1989)
- Rochenda Sandall (BA Acting 2012)
- Joan Sanderson (Acting Diploma 1939)
- James Saxon (Acting Diploma 1975)
- Margaretta Scott (Acting Diploma 1929)
- Shaun Scott (Acting Diploma 1979)
- Angela Scoular (Acting Diploma 1966)
- Graham Seed (Acting Diploma 1971)
- Johnny Sekka (Acting)
- Elizabeth Sellars (Acting Diploma 1940)
- John Sessions (Acting Diploma 1981)
- Athene Seyler (Acting Diploma 1908)
- Eve Shapiro (Stage Management Diploma 1961)
- Cyril Shaps (Acting Diploma 1949)
- Madhav Sharma (Acting Diploma 1963)
- Fiona Shaw (Acting Diploma 1982)
- Robert Shaw (Acting Diploma 1948)
- Sebastian Shaw (Acting Diploma 1926)
- Michael Sheard (Acting Diploma 1960)
- Rosie Sheehy (BA Acting 2015)
- Michael Sheen (Acting Diploma 1991)
- Paul Shelley (Acting Diploma 1966)
- Joy Shelton (Acting Diploma 1940)
- W. Morgan Sheppard (Acting Diploma 1958)
- Jane Sherwin (Acting Diploma 1954)
- Morag Siller
- Josh Silver (BA Acting 2012)
- Gerald Sim (Acting Diploma 1945)
- Sheila Sim (Acting Diploma 1942)
- Joan Sims (Acting Diploma 1950)
- Hugh Sinclair (Acting Diploma 1922)
- Valerie Singleton (Acting Diploma 1956)
- Colin Skipp (Acting Diploma 1965)
- Jeffrey Skitch (Acting)
- Daphne Slater (Acting Diploma 1946)
- Erika Slezak (Acting Diploma 1966)
- Jonathan Slinger (Acting Diploma 1994)
- Dodie Smith (Acting)
- Nicholas Smith (Acting Diploma 1957)
- Kyle Soller (BA Acting 2008)
- Timothy Spall (Acting Diploma 1978)
- Jeany Spark (BA Acting 2007)
- Roy Spencer (Acting Diploma 1956)
- Michael Spice (Acting Diploma 1953)
- Sophie Stanton (Acting Diploma 1991)
- Graham Stark (Acting Diploma 1953)
- Rebekah Staton (BA Acting 2002)
- Imelda Staunton (Acting Diploma 1976)
- John Steiner (Acting Diploma 1962)
- Shirley Stelfox (Acting Diploma 1959)
- Jeanette Sterke (Acting Diploma 1953)
- Joan Sterndale-Bennett (Acting Diploma 1934)
- Freddie Stevenson (BA Acting 2002)
- Gerda Stevenson (Acting)
- Juliet Stevenson (Acting Diploma 1977)
- Richard Stirling (Acting Diploma 1984)
- Nigel Stock (Acting Diploma 1937)
- Leonard Stone (Acting Diploma 1948)
- Sophie Leigh Stone (BA Acting 2008)
- Christopher Strauli (Acting Diploma 1969)
- Geoffrey Streatfeild (Acting Diploma 2000)
- Mark Strickson (Acting Diploma 1979)
- John Stride (Acting Diploma 1955)
- Imogen Stubbs (Acting Diploma 1985)
- Matilda Sturridge (Acting)
- Sara Sugarman (Acting Diploma 1989)
- Eleanor Summerfield (Acting Diploma 1940)
- Dudley Sutton (Acting Diploma 1957)
- Nora Swinburne (Acting)
- William Sylvester (Acting Diploma 1948)
- Elaine Symons (Acting Diploma 2000)
- Sylvia Syms (Acting Diploma 1953)

== T ==
- Sydney Tafler (Acting Diploma 1936)
- Mary Tamm (Acting Diploma 1971)
- Stella Tanner (Acting)
- Habib Tanvir (Acting Diploma 1955)
- Liza Tarbuck (Acting Diploma 1986)
- David Tate (Acting Diploma 1958)
- Jim Tavare (Acting Diploma 1985)
- Shaw Taylor (Acting Diploma 1951)
- Joan Temple (Acting Diploma 1916)
- Michelle Terry (BA Acting 2004)
- Josephine Tewson (Acting Diploma 1952)
- Torin Thatcher (Acting Diploma 1927)
- Abigail Thaw (Acting Diploma 1989)
- John Thaw (Acting Diploma 1960)
- Gareth Thomas (Acting Diploma 1966)
- Luke Thompson (BA Acting 2013)
- Shelley Thompson (Acting Diploma 1980)
- Stephen Thompson (Playwriting)
- Stephen Thorne (Acting Diploma 1957)
- Peggy Thorpe-Bates (Acting Diploma 1933)
- Linda Thorson (Acting Diploma 1967)
- Hilary Tindall (Acting Diploma 1958)
- Ellora Torchia (BA Acting 2014)
- John Tordoff (Acting Diploma 1957)
- Margaret Towner (Acting Diploma 1930s)
- Kevin Trainor (BA Acting 2004)
- Stephen Tredre (Acting Diploma 1987)
- Frederick Treves (Acting Diploma 1948)
- Edward Tudor-Pole (Acting Diploma 1977)
- Bridget Turner (Acting Diploma 1959)
- Kett Turton (BA Acting 2009)
- Dorothy Tutin (Acting Diploma 1949)
- Máiréad Tyers (BA Acting 2020)
- Margaret Tyzack (Acting Diploma 1951)

== U ==
- Robert Urquhart (Acting Diploma 1947)

== V ==
- Tony Van Bridge (Acting)
- André van Gyseghem (Acting)
- Tom Varey (BA Acting 2014)
- Indira Varma (Acting Diploma 1995)
- Tom Vaughan-Lawlor (BA Acting 2003)
- John Vernon (Acting Diploma 1955)
- Ronan Vibert (Acting Diploma 1985)
- Sara Vickers (BA Acting 2010)
- James Villiers (Acting Diploma 1953)
- Margaret Vines (Acting Diploma 1927)
- Tony Vogel (Acting Diploma 1963)
- Dick Vosburgh (Acting Diploma 1952)
- Craig Vye (BA Acting 2005)
- Rukmini Vasanth (Acting)

== W ==
- Zena Walker (Acting Diploma 1951)
- Phoebe Waller-Bridge (BA Acting 2006)
- Chris Walley (BA Acting 2018)
- Shani Wallis (Acting Diploma 1951)
- Katherine Walsh (Acting)
- David Warbeck (Acting Diploma 1967, left)
- Simon Ward (Acting Diploma 1963)
- Derek Ware (Acting Diploma 1957)
- Derek Waring (Acting Diploma 1950)
- David Warner (Acting Diploma 1961)
- Barry Warren (Acting Diploma 1955)
- Jason Watkins (Acting Diploma 1985)
- Peter Watkins (Acting Diploma 1953)
- Eileen Way (Acting Diploma 1930)
- Feryna Wazheir (Acting)
- Catherine Webb (Stage Electrics and Lighting Design Diploma 2010)
- Danny Webb (Acting Diploma 1977)
- David Westhead (Acting Diploma 1987)
- Jamael Westman (BA Acting 2016)
- David Weston (Acting Diploma 1961)
- Gary Whelan (Acting Diploma 1976)
- Ben Whishaw (BA Acting 2003)
- Billie Whitelaw (Acting)
- Hugh Whitemore (Acting Diploma 1957)
- John Whiting (Acting Diploma 1937)
- June Whitfield (Acting Diploma 1944)
- Nigel Whitmey (Acting Diploma 1989)
- Benjamin Whitrow (Acting Diploma 1959)
- Sharlene Whyte (Acting Diploma 1999)
- Sverre Wilberg (Acting Diploma 1955)
- James Wilby (Acting Diploma 1983)
- Brian Wilde (Acting Diploma 1947)
- Robert Wilfort (Acting Diploma 1998)
- Jeremy Wilkin (Acting Diploma 1950)
- Matt Wilkinson (Acting Diploma 1995)
- Tom Wilkinson (Acting Diploma 1973)
- Clare Wille (Acting Diploma 1997)
- Hugh Williams (Acting Diploma 1922)
- Michael Williams (Acting Diploma 1959)
- Anneke Wills (Acting Diploma 1959)
- Douglas Wilmer (Acting Diploma 1942)
- Julie Wilson (Acting Diploma 1954)
- Lydia Wilson (BA Acting 2009)
- Richard Wilson (Acting Diploma 1965)
- Stuart Wilson (Acting Diploma 1969)
- Nan Winton (Acting Diploma 1949)
- Michael Wisher (Acting Diploma 1959)
- Susan Wokoma (BA Acting 2010)
- Mark Womack (Acting Diploma 1986)
- Aimee Lou Wood (BA Acting 2017)
- Nicholas Woodeson (Acting Diploma 1974)
- Aubrey Woods (Acting Diploma 1946)
- John Woodvine (Acting Diploma 1953)
- Edward Woodward (Acting)
- Sarah Woodward (Acting Diploma 1983)
- Peter Woodward (Acting Diploma 1975)
- Fenella Woolgar (Acting Diploma 1999)
- Jonathan Wrather (Acting Diploma 1992)
- Ben Wright (Acting Diploma 1933)
- Tim Wylton (Acting Diploma 1960)
- Alex Wyndham (BA Acting 2005)

== Y ==
- Stephen Yardley (Acting Diploma 1963)
- Peter Yates (Acting Diploma 1952)
- Victoria Yeates (BA Acting 2006)
- Owain Yeoman (BA Acting 2003)
- Susannah York (Acting Diploma 1958)
- Kit Young (Acting Diploma 2017)
- Ric Young (Acting Diploma 1961)

== See also ==
- List of British actors
- Lists of people from London
