= 1993–94 Luton Town F.C. season =

English football club season

Luton Town
1993–94 season
- Chairman: David Kohler
- Manager: David Pleat
- Stadium: Kenilworth Road
- First Division: 20th
- FA Cup: Semi finals
- League Cup: First round
- Anglo-Italian Cup: Qualifying round
- Average home league attendance: 7,878

During the 1993–94 English football season, Luton Town F.C. competed in the Football League First Division.

== Season summary ==
The 1993–94 season started with David Pleat making Dixon's move permanent, and re-signing Mitchell Thomas from West Ham United. Although Luton struggled in the league, form was found in the FA Cup – Scott Oakes starred as Luton raced to the FA Cup semi-final and a trip to Wembley. 27,500 Luton supporters saw Gavin Peacock seal a 2–0 win for Chelsea, and after the semi-final defeat, Luton lost five games in a row. However, a 3–2 home win over West Bromwich Albion earned survival three games from the end of the season, keeping Luton in the second tier for another year.

== Final league table ==
Pos	Team	Pld	W	D	L	GF	GA	GD	Pts	Qualification or relegation
18	Barnsley	46	16	7	23	55	67	−12	55	
19	Watford	46	15	9	22	66	80	−14	54	
20	Luton Town	46	14	11	21	56	60	−4	53	
21	West Bromwich Albion	46	13	12	21	60	69	−9	51	
22	Birmingham City (R)	46	13	12	21	52	69	−17	51	Relegation to the Second Division

Source: rsssf.com
Rules for classification: 1) Points; 2) Goals scored; 3) Goal difference
(R) Relegated

== Results ==
Luton Town's score comes first

=== Legend ===
Win	Draw	Loss

=== Football League First Division ===
Date	Opponent	Venue	Result	Attendance	Scorers
14 August 1993	Watford	H	2–1	9,149	Telfer, Dixon
21 August 1993	Portsmouth	A	0–1	12,248	
28 August 1993	Nottingham Forest	H	1–2	9,788	Hartson
11 September 1993	Bolton Wanderers	H	0–2	7,199	
14 September 1993	Tranmere Rovers	A	1–4	5,871	Benjamin
18 September 1993	Middlesbrough	A	0–0	12,487	
25 September 1993	Birmingham City	A	1–1	11,801	Telfer
2 October 1993	Barnsley	H	5–0	6,201	Hartson, Oakes (2), James, Houghton
5 October 1993	Bristol City	H	0–2	5,956	
9 October 1993	Derby County	A	1–2	15,885	Williams
16 October 1993	Notts County	H	1–0	6,366	Dickov
20 October 1993	Sunderland	A	0–2	13,645	
23 October 1993	Oxford United	A	1–0	5,161	Hughes
30 October 1993	Leicester City	H	0–2	8,813	
2 November 1993	Crystal Palace	A	2–3	10,925	Aunger, Hughes
7 November 1993	Charlton Athletic	H	1–0	6,327	Telfer
13 November 1993	Southend United	A	1–2	5,567	Dixon
27 November 1993	Stoke City	H	6–2	7,384	Dixon (3), Hughes, Oakes, Hartson
4 December 1993	Charlton Athletic	A	0–1	7,570	
11 December 1993	Tranmere Rovers	H	0–1	7,075	
19 December 1993	Watford	A	2–2	7,567	Preece, Dreyer (pen)
27 December 1993	Peterborough United	A	0–0	9,522	
29 December 1993	Grimsby Town	H	2–1	7,234	Hughes, Harper
1 January 1994	West Bromwich Albion	A	1–1	16,138	Preece
15 January 1994	Notts County	A	2–1	6,589	Dixon (2)
22 January 1994	Derby County	H	2–1	9,371	Telfer, Oakes
5 February 1994	Oxford United	H	3–0	7,366	Oakes, Thomas, Thorpe
12 February 1994	Leicester City	A	1–2	16,194	James
22 February 1994	Portsmouth	H	4–1	6,533	Telfer, Preece, Hughes, Oakes
26 February 1994	Sunderland	H	2–1	9,367	Hughes, Oakes
5 March 1994	Nottingham Forest	A	0–2	22,249	
8 March 1994	Middlesbrough	H	1–1	6,741	Dreyer (pen)
19 March 1994	Birmingham City	H	1–1	7,690	Telfer
26 March 1994	Barnsley	A	0–1	6,289	
30 March 1994	Millwall	A	2–2	9,235	Dreyer, Hartson
2 April 1994	Peterborough United	H	2–0	8,398	Dixon (2)
4 April 1994	Grimsby Town	A	0–2	5,542	
12 April 1994	Wolverhampton Wanderers	H	0–2	8,545	
16 April 1994	Crystal Palace	H	0–1	9,880	
19 April 1994	Bristol City	A	0–1	5,350	
23 April 1994	Wolverhampton Wanderers	A	0–1	25,479	
26 April 1994	Millwall	H	1–1	8,257	Preece
30 April 1994	Southend United	H	1–1	7,504	Hartson
3 May 1994	West Bromwich Albion	H	3–2	10,053	Preece, James, Hartson
5 May 1994	Bolton Wanderers	A	1–2	7,102	Hughes
8 May 1994	Stoke City	A	2–2	15,893	Oakes, Telfer (pen)

=== FA Cup ===
Round	Date	Opponent	Venue	Result	Attendance	Goalscorers
R3	18 January 1994	Southend United	H	1–0	7,953	Telfer
R4	29 January 1994	Newcastle United	A	1–1	32,216	Thorpe
R4R	9 February 1994	Newcastle United	H	2–0	12,503	Hartson, Oakes
R5	20 February 1994	Cardiff City	A	2–1	17,296	Oakes, Preece
QF	14 March 1994	West Ham United	A	0–0	27,331	
QFR	23 March 1994	West Ham United	H	3–2	13,166	Oakes (3)
SF	9 April 1994	Chelsea	N	0–2	59,989	

=== League Cup ===
Round	Date	Opponent	Venue	Result	Attendance	Goalscorers
R1 1st leg	17 August 1993	Cambridge United	A	0–1	4,065	
R1 2nd leg	24 August 1993	Cambridge United	H	0–1 (lost 0–2 on agg)	3,861	

=== Anglo-Italian Cup ===
Round	Date	Opponent	Venue	Result	Attendance	Goalscorers
Q Group 7	31 August 1993	Watford	A	1–2	2,854	
Q Group 7	7 September 1993	Southend United	H	1–1	1,823	

== Squad ==
Note: Flags indicate national team as defined under FIFA eligibility rules; some limited exceptions apply. Players may hold more than one non-FIFA nationality.

No.	Pos.	Nation	Player
-	GK	(United States) USA	Juergen Sommer
-	GK	(Australia) AUS	Andy Petterson
-	GK	(England) ENG	Kelvin Davis
-	DF	(England) ENG	Marvin Johnson
-	DF	(England) ENG	Julian James
-	DF	(England) ENG	John Dreyer
-	DF	(England) ENG	Richard Harvey
-	DF	(England) ENG	Des Linton
-	DF	(England) ENG	Trevor Peake
-	DF	(England) ENG	Alan Harper
-	DF	(England) ENG	David Greene
-	DF	(England) ENG	Mitchell Thomas
-	DF	(England) ENG	Gregor Rioch
-	DF	(England) ENG	Jamie Campbell
-	DF	(England) ENG	Aaron Skelton

No.	Pos.	Nation	Player
-	MF	(England) ENG	David Preece
-	MF	(Scotland) SCO	Paul Telfer
-	MF	(Wales) WAL	Jason Rees
-	MF	(England) ENG	Paul McLaren
-	MF	(Wales) WAL	Ceri Hughes
-	MF	(England) ENG	Scott Houghton
-	MF	(England) ENG	Mark Burke (on loan from Wolves)
-	FW	(England) ENG	Scott Oakes
-	FW	(England) ENG	Tony Thorpe
-	FW	(England) ENG	Kerry Dixon
-	FW	(Wales) WAL	John Hartson
-	FW	(England) ENG	Martin Williams
-	FW	(Scotland) SCO	Paul Dickov (on loan from Arsenal)
-	FW	(Canada) CAN	Geoff Aunger
-	FW	(England) ENG	Ian Benjamin

== Player details ==
Players arranged in alphabetical order by surname.

Pos.	Name	League		League Cup		Anglo Italian Cup		FA Cup		Total	
Pos.	Name	Apps	Goals	Apps	Goals	Apps	Goals	Apps	Goals	Apps	Goals
FW	(Canada) Geoff Aunger	5	1	2	0	1	0	2 (1)	0	33 (5)	0
FW	(England) Ian Benjamin	2 (1)	1	0	0	0	0	0	0	2 (1)	1
MF	(England) Mark Burke	2 (1)	0	0	0	0	0	(1)	0	2 (2)	0
DF	(England) Jamie Campbell	4 (12)	0	1	0	0	0	1 (2)	0	6 (14)	0
GK	(England) Kelvin Davis	1	0	0	0	0	0	0	0	1	0
FW	(Scotland) Paul Dickov	8 (7)	1	0	0	0	0	0	0	8 (7)	1
FW	(England) Kerry Dixon	27 (2)	9	0	0	2	1	5 (1)	0	34 (3)	10
DF	(England) John Dreyer	39	3	2	0	2	0	7	0	50	3
DF	(England) David Greene	9	0	0	0	0 (1)	0	1	0	10 (1)	0
DF	(England) Alan Harper	39 (1)	1	0	0	0	0	7	0	46 (1)	1
FW	(Wales) John Hartson	20 (14)	6	0 (1)	0	0	0	2 (3)	1	22 (18)	7
MF	(England) Scott Houghton	6 (8)	1	1 (1)	0	2	0	0 (1)	0	9 (10)	1
MF	(Wales) Ceri Hughes	41	7	2	0	1	0	5	0	49	7
DF	(England) Julian James	28 (4)	3	2	0	1	0	7	0	38 (4)	3
DF	(England) Marvin Johnson	17	0	2	0	2	0	0	0	21	0
DF	(England) Des Linton	31 (1)	0	0	1	0	7	0	0	39 (1)	0
FW	(England) Paul McLaren	0 (1)	0	0	0	0	0	0	0	0 (1)	0
FW	(England) Scott Oakes	32 (3)	8	1 (1)	0	0 (1)	0	7	5	40 (5)	13
DF	(England) Trevor Peake	36	0	0	0	0	0	6	0	42	0
GK	(Australia) Andy Petterson	2 (3)	0	0	0	0	0	0	0	2 (3)	0
MF	(England) David Preece	27 (1)	5	2	0	2	0	7	1	38 (1)	6
MF	(Wales) Jason Rees	8 (2)	0	1	0	0	0	0	0	9 (2)	0
GK	(United States) Juergen Sommer	43	0	2	0	2	0	7	0	53	0
MF	(Scotland) Paul Telfer	43 (1)	7	1	0	1	0	7	1	52 (1)	8
DF	(England) Mitchell Thomas	17 (2)	1	0	0	0	0	0	0	17 (2)	1
FW	(England) Tony Thorpe	4 (9)	1	0	0	0	0	1 (1)	1	5 (10)	2
FW	(England) Martin Williams	5 (10)	1	1	0	1(1)	0	2	0	7 (11)	1
FW	(England) Matthew Woolgar	0	0	0	0	0 (1)	0	0	0	0 (1)	0
