= Jack Woolgar =

British actor (1913–1978)

- Spotlight photo, 1969
- Born: Jack William Woolgar; 15 September 1913; Tolworth, England
- Died: 14 July 1978 (aged 64); Huddersfield, West Yorkshire, England
- Occupation: Actor
- Spouses: Elizabeth Mann (m. 1949)
- Children: 4

Jack William Woolgar (15 September 1913 – 14 July 1978) was a British character actor working in television and film in the 1960s and 1970s. He began acting towards the end of the Second World War in Europe and turned professional shortly afterwards, working in repertory theatre and touring the UK. He acted on live TV in Granada during the 1950s, whilst at the Theatre Royal, Huddersfield.

== Career ==
Woolgar was often cast as dirty old tramps, such as The Avengers episode "The Living Dead" - he had lifelong chest problems and he was able to produce a bubbling hacking cough at will. Prominent roles include the coal miner father in Stand Up, Nigel Barton, an autobiographical play by Dennis Potter, and Sam Carne 'Carney' in the soap opera Crossroads. He also played Professor Kirke in the 1967 serial of The Lion, the Witch and the Wardrobe, the lighthouse keeper in Tom Grattan's War (The Wreckers) 1968, as well as Professor Branestawm in the 1969 series The Incredible Adventures of Professor Branestawm. Other appearances include roles in Please Sir (The Generation Gap), The Liver Birds (Grandad), The Onedin Line (The Hostage/Survivor), The Sweeney (Jigsaw), old Joe Hargreaves in Whatever Happened to the Likely Lads? (The Shape Of Things To Come) 1974, and Doctor Who (The Web of Fear).

He was married to the RADA trained actress Elizabeth Mann (13 July 1920 – 18 February 1980) and had four children.

== Partial filmography ==
- The Spy with a Cold Nose (1966) - Zookeeper (uncredited)
- Hammerhead (1968) - Tookey Tate
- Where's Jack? (1969) - Mr. Woods
- Say Hello to Yesterday (1971) - Boy's father (uncredited)
- The Raging Moon (1971) - Bruce's Father
- The Snow Goose (1972) - Pinnace Captain
- Death Line (1972) - Platform Inspector
- Gawain and the Green Knight (1973) - Porter
- Swallows and Amazons (1974) - Old Billy
