= The Hidden Tiger =

- The Avengers episode
- Episode no.: Season 5 Episode 8
- Directed by: Sidney Hayers
- Written by: Philip Levene (teleplay)
- Original air dates: 1 March 1967 (Southern Television); 4 March 1967 (ABC Weekend TV)

Guest appearances
- Ronnie Barker; Lyndon Brook; Gabrielle Drake; John Phillips

Episode chronology
← Previous "The Living Dead"	Next → "The Correct Way to Kill"

"The Hidden Tiger" is the eighth episode of the fifth series of the 1960s cult British spy-fi television series The Avengers, starring Patrick Macnee and Diana Rigg, and guest starring Ronnie Barker, Lyndon Brook, Gabrielle Drake, and John Phillips. It was first broadcast in the Southern and Tyne Tees regions of the ITV network on Wednesday 1 March 1967. ABC Weekend Television, who commissioned the show for ITV, broadcast it in its own regions three days later on Saturday 4 March. The episode was directed by Sidney Hayers, and written by Philip Levene.

== Plot ==
Housecats are suddenly turning into ravaging beasts and mauling their owners fatally. Steed and Emma set out to investigate P.U.R.R.R. where the cats come from.

== Cast ==
- Patrick Macnee as John Steed
- Diana Rigg as Emma Peel
- Ronnie Barker as Cheshire
- Lyndon Brook as Dr. Manx
- Gabrielle Drake as Angora
- John Phillips as Nesbit
- Michael Forrest as Peters
- Stanley Meadows as Erskine
- Jack Gwillim as Sir David Harper
- Frederick Treves as Dawson
- Brian Haines as Samuel Jones
- John Moore as Williams
- Reg Pritchard as Bellamy
