= The Cybernauts =

- The Avengers episode
- Screen title
- Episode no.: Season 4 Episode 3
- Directed by: Sidney Hayers
- Written by: Philip Levene
- Original air dates: 12 October 1965 (Scottish Television); 16 October 1965 (ABC Weekend TV)

Guest appearances
- Michael Gough; Frederick Jaeger; Bernard Horsfall; Burt Kwouk; John Hollis; Ronald Leigh-Hunt

Episode chronology
← Previous "The Gravediggers"	Next → "Death at Bargain Prices"

"The Cybernauts" is the third episode of the fourth series of the 1960s cult British spy-fi television series The Avengers, starring Patrick Macnee and Diana Rigg. It was first broadcast by Scottish Television on Tuesday 12 October 1965. ABC Weekend Television, who commissioned the show, broadcast it in its own regions four days later on Saturday 16 October. The episode was directed by Sidney Hayers and written by Philip Levene.

== Plot ==
Hammond, a middle-aged man, is attacked at home by an unseen intruder who forces his way through the door with the force of a battering ram, and appears to be immune to bullets. Steed and Mrs Peel investigate. The intruder strikes again, this time a businessman named Lambert in his office, smashing his way in the same way. On the scene, Mrs Peel notices the way Lambert's neck has been broken without bruising to the face by the angle of the head. She surmises that he was killed by a type of advanced karate blow known as inku, of which there are few expert exponents in Europe. Lambert's company, like Hammond's, is on a list of firms competing for the European rights to Japanese businessman Mr Tusamo's new circuit elements that will replace the transistor.

Mrs Peel visits a karate dojo seeking an inku specialist and is lectured by the bald sensei. After Mrs Peel proves her skill by defeating the female karate student Oyuka ("the immovable one"), the sensei allows her to join the dojo.

Steed, in place of Lambert, visits Tusamo. Mrs Peel visits Jephcott Products, a toy factory that specialises in manufacturing electronic toys. At the karate dojo, Oyama ("the tall mountain"), a 5th dan at judo and a 4th dan at karate, demonstrates his skill to a packed room, and fits the description of the tall killer, by his height and explosive strike. Mrs Peel recognizes the man as Jephcott, the head of the toy company.

Steed visits United Automation and meets the ex-ministry scientist Dr Clement Armstrong, owner of the factory. After Steed explains his interest in computers, Armstrong's sidekick Benson contacts the scientist via two-way videophone and mentions that someone replaced Lambert at Tusamo's office. Armstrong shows his visitor to Benson, who recognises Steed as the false Lambert. Armstrong gives Steed a parting gift: a gadget pen containing solid ink which liquefies only in the heat of the hand, thus reducing the danger of leaks.

Steed and Mrs Peel visit the toy factory and discover that Jephcott has been killed by something with the force of a ten-ton truck, leaving a hole in the wall in the shape of a tall man.

Steed revisits United Automation, this time covertly, and discovers that Armstrong has been using a robot Cybernaut named Roger to kill off his rivals for the Tusamo concession. The Cybernaut is programmed via computer to home in on a radio transmitter concealed in the gadget pen given to Steed – the same method used to kill Hammond, Lambert and Jephcott. But Steed's pen is in the possession of Mrs Peel, so the Cybernaut will attack her rather than Steed. Dr Armstrong discovers Steed is an intruder in the building when the thermostat in the factory is altered. Steed attempts to phone Mrs Peel to warn her but, before the Cybernaut arrives, she leaves her flat to look for him at United Automation as Steed has not returned at the pre-arranged time. Steed is then attacked by another Cybernaut in the factory and presented to Armstrong.

Mrs Peel arrives at Armstrong's factory, with the Cybernaut still following the pen she carries. Steed escapes and enters the warehouse room in which the Cybernaut has cornered Mrs Peel, and tells Mrs Peel to throw him the pen. Another Cybernaut (the first with a "brain of its own") arrives with Armstrong. Steed plants the pen on the second Cybernaut and they attack each other and accidentally kill Armstrong as he attempts to stop his robots. Roger, the first Cybernaut, then destroys the other by smashing its "brain" out of its head and destroys the pen. Having completed its mission it becomes inert, and Mrs Peel pushes it over with a finger.

== Cast ==
- Patrick Macnee as John Steed
- Diana Rigg as Emma Peel
- Michael Gough as Dr Clement Armstrong
- Frederick Jaeger as Benson
- Bernard Horsfall as Jephcott
- Burt Kwouk as Tusamo
- John Hollis as Sensei
- Ronald Leigh-Hunt as Bob Lambert
- Gordon Whiting as Samuel Hammond
- John Franklyn-Robbins as Gilbert (uncredited)
- Diane Clare as Lambert's Secretary (uncredited)

== Production ==
Production for the episode was completed from 2 March to mid-March 1965.

== Reception ==
The episode is generally considered to be one of the best of the fourth series and eventually resulted in two sequels. Return of the Cybernauts in September 1967, starred Peter Cushing as Armstrong's revengeful brother, with Frederick Jaeger returning as his assistant Benson. The New Avengers episode The Last of the Cybernauts...? followed in 1976. Jeffrey S. Miller described the episode as "a tale of industrial intrigue, with several business executives being violently dispatched by someone of apparently superhuman strength." The Encyclopedia of Super Villains describes the Cybernauts as "powerful androids with silvery skin and blank expressions." The 1998 film The Avengers pays homage to the episode with Uma Thurman playing Dr Peel, a jujitsu expert and specialist in meteorology, "battling a clone duplicate of herself."
