= The Living Dead (The Avengers) =

- The Avengers episode
- Opening title
- Episode no.: Season 5 Episode 7
- Directed by: John Krish
- Written by: Brian Clemens (teleplay)
- Original air dates: 22 February 1967 (Southern Television); 25 February 1967 (ABC Weekend TV)

Guest appearances
- Julian Glover; Pamela Ann Davy; Howard Marion-Crawford; Jack Woolgar

Episode chronology
← Previous "The Winged Avenger"	Next → "The Hidden Tiger"

"The Living Dead" is the seventh episode of the fifth series of the 1960s cult British spy-fi television series The Avengers, starring Patrick Macnee and Diana Rigg, and guest starring Julian Glover, Pamela Ann Davy, Howard Marion-Crawford, and Jack Woolgar. It was first broadcast in the Southern and Tyne Tees regions of the ITV network on Wednesday 22 February 1967. ABC Weekend Television, who commissioned the show for ITV, broadcast it in its own regions three days later on Saturday 25 February. The episode was directed by John Krish, and written by Brian Clemens.

== Plot ==
When the ghost of the deceased Duke of Benedict turns up in the cemetery, Steed and Emma have to check out the mining disaster that apparently killed the duke.

== Cast ==
- Patrick Macnee as John Steed
- Diana Rigg as Emma Peel
- Julian Glover as Masgard
- Pamela Ann Davy as Mandy Mackay
- Howard Marion Crawford as Geoffrey, 16th Duke of Benedict
- Jack Woolgar as Kermit the Hermit
- Jack Watson as Hopper
- Edward Underdown as Rupert Staplow, 15th Duke of Benedict
- John Cater as Olliphant
- Vernon Dobtcheff as George Spencer
- Alister Williamson as Tom
