= The Gravediggers (The Avengers) =

- The Avengers episode
- Promotional image, showing Steed untying Mrs Peel from a miniature railway track
- Episode no.: Season 4 Episode 2
- Directed by: Quentin Lawrence
- Written by: Malcolm Hulke
- Original air dates: 5 October 1965 (Scottish Television); 9 October 1965 (ABC Weekend TV)

Guest appearances
- Ronald Fraser; Paul Massie; Caroline Blakiston; Victor Platt; Charles Lamb; Wanda Ventham

Episode chronology
← Previous "The Town of No Return"	Next → "The Cybernauts"

"The Gravediggers" is the second episode of the fourth series of the 1960s cult British spy-fi television series The Avengers, starring Patrick Macnee and Diana Rigg. It was first broadcast by Scottish Television on Tuesday 5 October 1965. ABC Weekend Television, who commissioned the show, broadcast it in its own regions four days later on Saturday 9 October. The episode was directed by Quentin Lawrence, and written by Malcolm Hulke.

== Plot ==
Steed and Emma visit a railway buff to investigate a deathly plot to sabotage the country's early warning radar defence systems.

== Cast ==
- Patrick Macnee as John Steed
- Diana Rigg as Emma Peel
- Ronald Fraser as Sir Horace Winslip
- Paul Massie as Johnson
- Caroline Blakiston as Miss Thirlwell
- Victor Platt as Sexton
- Charles Lamb as Fred
- Wanda Ventham as Nurse Spray
- Ray Austin as Baron
- Steven Berkoff as Sager
- Bryan Mosley as Miller
- Lloyd Lamble as Dr. Hubert Marlow
- Aubrey Richards as Dr. Palmer (uncredited)

== Location ==
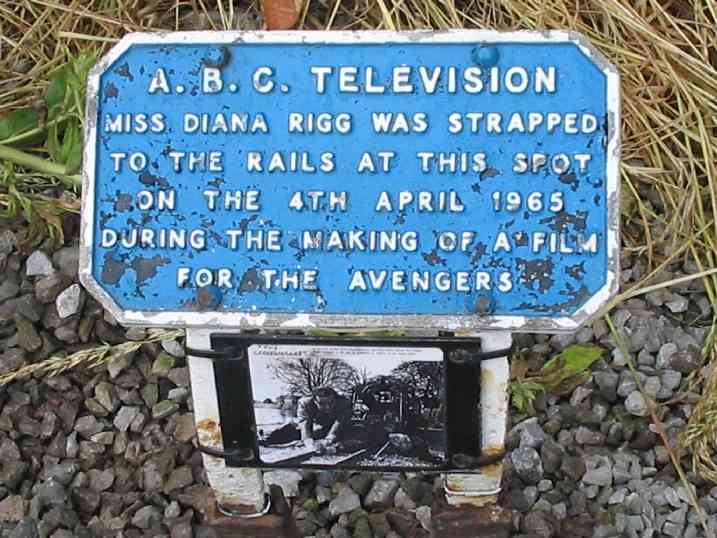
The Avengers location plate at Stapleford Park

The Stapleford Miniature Railway near Melton Mowbray, Leicestershire was where Emma Peel was filmed tied to the railway track.
