= Be My Guest (film) =

1965 British film by Lance Comfort

- Theatrical release poster
- Directed by: Lance Comfort
- Screenplay by: Lyn Fairhurst
- Story by: Lyn Fairhurst
- Produced by: Lance Comfort
- Starring: David Hemmings; Steve Marriott
- Cinematography: Basil Emmott
- Edited by: Sidney Stone
- Music by: Shel Talmy
- Color process: Black and white
- Production companies: Three Kings; Filmusic
- Distributed by: The Rank Organisation
- Release date: April 1965 (London)
- Running time: 82 minutes
- Country: United Kingdom
- Language: English

Be My Guest is a 1965 British second feature ('B') musical film directed by Lance Comfort and starring David Hemmings and Steve Marriott. It was written by Lyn Fairhurst and was a follow-up to Live It Up! (1963). It was released as a support the Morecambe and Wise film The Intelligence Men.

American rock music producer Shel Talmy coordinated the film's musical score. Talmy also composed the title music which was performed by The Niteshades, who also appear in the closing scene. The recording, released on CBS Records, reached no. 32 on pirate radio station Radio London's chart in the summer of 1965.

== Plot ==
Dave Martin moves with his parents from London to Brighton to run a guest house. On the way, Dave meets American singer Erica Page, who stays with them at the boarding house. Dave's friends Ricky and Phil also move in. Dave and his friends enter a competition for best local group. They find the competition is rigged and their exposé makes headlines in the local paper.

== Cast ==
- David Hemmings as Dave Martin
- Steve Marriott as Ricky
- John Pike as Phil
- Andrea Monet as Erica Page
- Ivor Salter as Herbert Martin
- Diana King as Margaret Martin
- Avril Angers as Mrs. Pucil
- Joyce Blair as Wanda
- David Healy as Milton Bass (as David Healey)
- Tony Wager as Artie Clough
- David Lander as Routledge
- Robin Stewart as Jim Matthews
- Monica Evans as Dyllis
- Pamela Ann Davy as Zena (as Pamela Ann Davies)
- Douglas Ives as steward
- Jerry Lee Lewis as self
- The Nashville Teens as themselves
- The Zephyrs as Slash Wildly and the Cut Throats
- Kenny & The Wranglers as Rocky Steel and the Sparks (as Kenny And The Wranglers)
- The Niteshades as themselves
- The Plebs as themselves

== Musicians (alphabetical) ==
- Ken Bernard – singer (as Kenny and the Wranglers)
- John Carpenter – drummer of The Zephyrs (as Slash Wildly and the Cut Throats)
- Terry Crowe – singer (as The Plebs)
- Mick Dunford – guitarist (as The Plebs)
- John Hawken – pianist (as The Nashville Teens)
- John Hinde – bassist of The Zephyrs (as Slash Wildly and the Cut-Throats)
- Mike Lease – organist of The Zephyrs (as Slash Wildly and the Cut-Throats)
- Jerry Lee Lewis with The Nashville Teens
- Danny McCulloch – bassist (as The Plebs)
- The Nashville Teens
- John Peeby – guitarist of The Zephyrs (as Slash Wildly and the Cut-Throats)
- Ray Phillips – vocalist (with The Nashville Teens)
- Pete Shannon – bassist (with The Nashville Teens)
- Arthur Sharp – singer (with The Nashville Teens)
- Howard Roberts – organist (with The Niteshades)
- Martin Davies – bassist (with The Niteshades)
- Tony Lopez – singer (with The Niteshades)
- Ricky King – guitarist (with The Niteshades)
- Ed Sones – singer (with The Niteshades)
- Keith Harvey – drummer (with The Niteshades)

== Songs ==
- The Niteshades, "Be My Guest"
- The Nashville Teens, "Watcha Gonna Do"
- Kenny and the Wranglers, "Somebody Help Me"
- Joyce Blair, "Gotta Get Away Now"
- The Zephyrs, "She Laughed"
- Jerry Lee Lewis, backed by The Plebs, "No One But Me"

== Production ==
It was filmed at Pinewood Studios, England.

Characters Phil and Ricky are shown working aboard a Blue Pullman train before being fired and thus stranded in Brighton. Despite this never being a Blue Pullman destination.

== Reception ==
The Monthly Film Bulletin wrote: "Although not particularly well-made (the editing is unusually erratic), this tremendously good-humoured teenage frolic is kept alive by the hopefulness of its performances, particularly those of David Hemmings as the ingenuous Dave, and Avril Angers as the well-meaning crosspatch of a cook who "comes with" the boarding house. The Beat groups are used sparingly, and with a certain sense of fun, although one is probably wrong in thinking that the long-haired Nashville Teens are parodying themselves on purpose."

Kine Weekly wrote: "This is a simple little tale, embellished with uncomplicated humour and music in the modern idiom. The direction and characterisation are straightforward and the humour is simple."

Variety wrote: "Designed as a second feature pic and to cash in on the still current vogue for the juve pop talent mar ket, this one does its job adequately. Local patrons will enjoy an earful of some of the local groups, but nobody outside the United Kingdom will go overboard. Lyn Faithurst's script reveals pro knowhow and Lance Comfort is a director with planty of savvy. Result is an unambitlous item that is a cut above many program film fillers. David Hemmings and Andrea Monet put over some calf love romance, somewhat self-consciously with Miss Monet showing her paces as a possible up-and-comer in the soubrette stakes, though a shade short on star sparkle. Ivor Salter and Diana King do their best in Mom and Dad roles, but have little opportunity in conventional situations. Avril Angers, as a battleaxe of a housekeeper, reveals a deft comedy attack. Miss Angers, an experienced, local comedienne, currently playing in "Little Me" in the West End, is inexplicably overlooked in this pix. Other roles that stand out are David Healey, as a genial, egotistic impresario; and, particularly, Joyce Blair, as his girl friend. Miss Blair, though now blonde instead of brunet [sic], has two or three promising spots and proves herself a useful "blonde temptress" type."

The Radio Times Guide to Films gave the film 3/5 stars, writing: "The second of two unassuming but spirited little pop musicals (the first was Live It Up) released during the British beat boom of the 1960s. David Hemmings is once again the star, this time playing a newspaper office boy, who tries to launch the "Brighton beat", but tangles with unscrupulous music industry bigwigs. The format and mood belong to the earlier rock 'n' roll era (Jerry Lee Lewis is one of the guest stars). But the snappy script is played with verve by all concerned, and the result is a very jolly piece of pop history."

== See also ==
- Pipeline Instrumental Review, the Niteshades performed live at the final convention in 2014.
