= Michael Gough =

British actor (1916–2011)

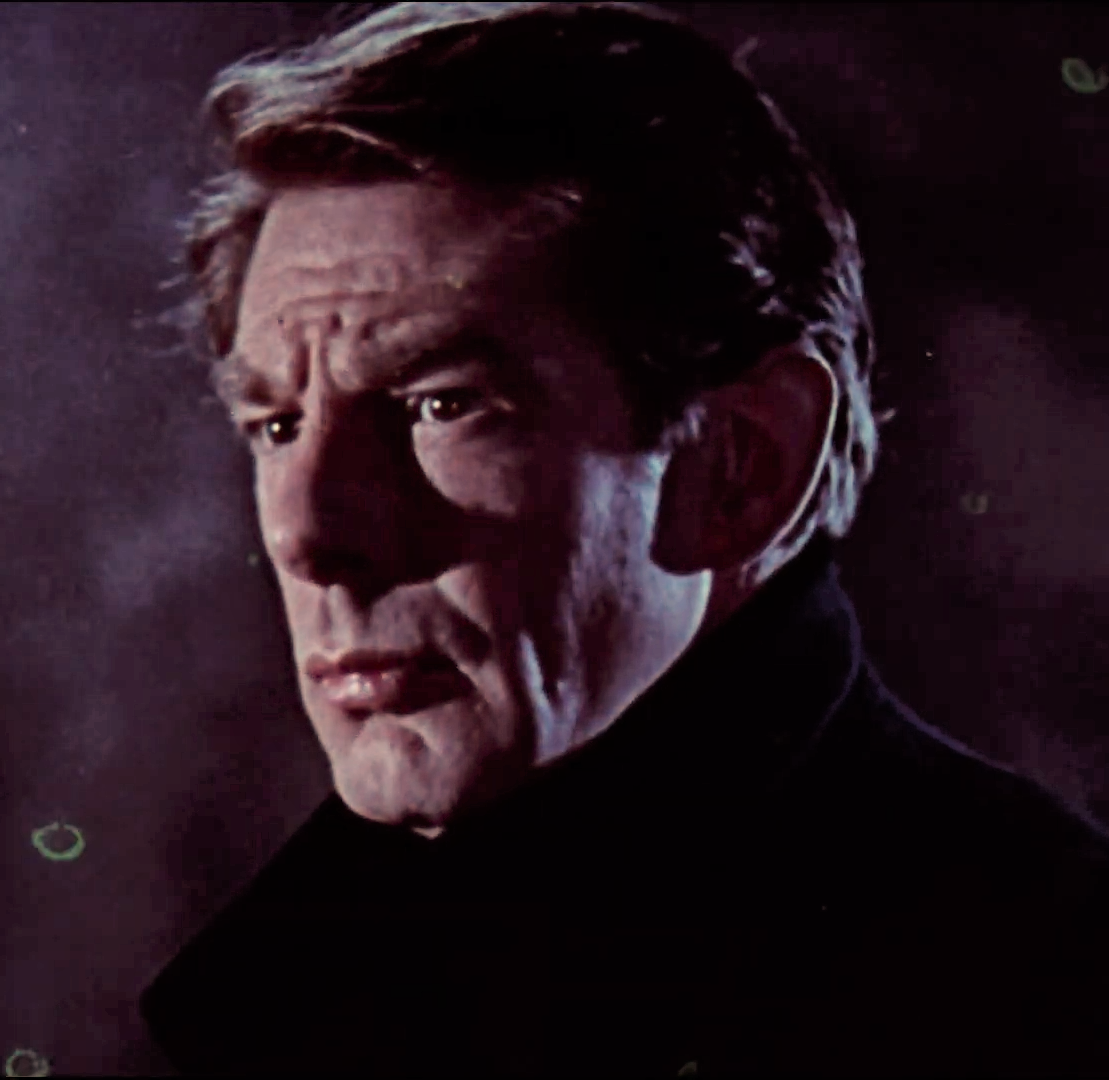
- Gough as Arthur Holmwood in Dracula (1958)
- Born: Francis Michael Gough; 23 November 1916; Kuala Lumpur, Federated Malay States
- Died: 17 March 2011 (aged 94); Ashmore, Dorset, England
- Resting place: Cremated; ashes scattered in the English Channel
- Citizenship: United Kingdom
- Education: Wye Agricultural College; The Old Vic
- Occupation: Actor
- Years active: 1946–1999; 2005; 2010
- Spouses: Diana Graves (m. 1937; div. 1948); Anne Leon (m. 1950; div. 1962); Anneke Wills (m. 1965; div. 1979); Henrietta Lawrence (m. 1981)
- Children: 4

Francis Michael Gough (/ɡɒf/ GOF; 23 November 1916 – 17 March 2011) was a British actor who made more than 150 film and television appearances. He is known for his roles in the Hammer horror films, with his first role as Sir Arthur Holmwood in Dracula (1958), and for his recurring role as Alfred Pennyworth in the four Batman films directed by Tim Burton and Joel Schumacher (1989–1997). He also appeared in Burton's Sleepy Hollow (1999), and voiced Elder Gutknecht in Corpse Bride (2005) and the Dodo in Alice in Wonderland (2010).

Gough appeared extensively on British television. In 1957 he received a British Academy Television Award for Best Actor. In Doctor Who he played the titular villain in The Celestial Toymaker (1966) and Councillor Hedin in Arc of Infinity (1983), and in The Avengers episode "The Cybernauts" (1965) he played the automation-obsessed wheelchair user Dr. Armstrong.

At the National Theatre in London, Gough excelled as a comedian, playing a resigned and rueful parent in Alan Ayckbourn's Bedroom Farce (1977). When the comedy transferred to Broadway in 1978 he won a Tony Award. One of Gough's most well-received West End roles was as Baron von Epp in the 1983 revival of John Osborne's A Patriot for Me.

== Early life ==
Gough was born in Kuala Lumpur, Federated Malay States (now Malaysia) on 23 November 1916, the son of English parents Francis Berkeley Gough, a rubber planter, and Frances Atkins (née Bailie). Gough was educated at Rose Hill School, Tunbridge Wells, and at Durham School. He moved on to Wye Agricultural College, which he left to go to The Old Vic. During World War II, Gough was a conscientious objector, like his friend Frith Banbury, although he was obliged to serve in the Non-Combatant Corps, a member of 6 Northern Company, in Liverpool.

== Career ==
In 1948, Gough made his film debut in Blanche Fury and thereafter appeared extensively on British television. In 1955, he portrayed one of the two murderers (the other was Michael Ripper) who kill the Duke of Clarence (John Gielgud), as well as the Princes in the Tower in Laurence Olivier's Richard III.

Gough became known for his appearances in horror films; following his performance as Arthur Holmwood in Hammer's original Dracula (1958), his horror roles mainly saw him feature as slimy villains, notably in Horrors of the Black Museum (1959), Konga (1961), The Phantom of the Opera (1962), Black Zoo (1963), Trog (1970), The Corpse (1971), Horror Hospital (1973) and Norman J. Warren's cheaply made Satanism shocker Satan's Slave (1976). He also spoofed his horror persona in What a Carve Up! (1961) as a sinister butler. He also appeared in the comedy film Top Secret! (1984), alongside Val Kilmer (the latter's first feature film), with whom he would also work later in the film Batman Forever.

Gough guest-starred in Doctor Who, as the titular villain in The Celestial Toymaker (1966) and also as Councillor Hedin in Arc of Infinity (1983). He was set to reprise his role as the Toymaker in the proposed 23rd-season story The Nightmare Fair, but the season and the serial were cancelled and never produced. He also played the automation-obsessed wheelchair user Dr. Armstrong in "The Cybernauts", one of the best-remembered episodes of The Avengers (1965), returning the following season as the Russian spymaster Nutski in "The Correct Way to Kill". He was introduced in the first-season episode "Maximum Security" of Colditz as Major "Willi" Schaeffer, the alcoholic second-in-command of the Kommandant (Bernard Hepton). In the Ian Curteis television play Suez 1956 (1979), he portrayed Prime Minister Anthony Eden. In 1981, he was reunited with Laurence Olivier in Granada Television's Brideshead Revisited, portraying the doctor to Olivier's dying Lord Marchmain. He played Mikhel, a slippery assistant to a slain British spy opposite Alec Guinness in the television adaptation of John le Carré's Smiley's People the following year. Gough also appeared in The Citadel (1983) as Sir Jenner Halliday, in 1985's Out of Africa as Lord Delamere and as the fictional deposed KGB spymaster Andrei Zorin in Sleepers.

=== Later roles ===
Later in his career, Gough played Alfred Pennyworth in Tim Burton's blockbuster films Batman (1989) and Batman Returns (1992). He returned to the role in Batman Forever (1995) and Batman & Robin (1997) for Joel Schumacher. Gough was one of two actors to have appeared in the four Batman films in the Burton/Schumacher series—the other being Pat Hingle as Commissioner Gordon. He also voiced the character in two BBC radio dramas—Batman: The Lazarus Syndrome (1989) and the 1994 adaptation of Batman: Knightfall. Gough reprised his role in a 1989 advertisement for Diet Coke, specially shot footage used for the original 1992 Warner Bros. Movie World Batman Adventure Ride, and in 2000, six television commercials for the OnStar automobile tracking system (informing Batman of the system's installation in the Batmobile).

Gough retired in 1999 after appearing in Burton's Sleepy Hollow. He would emerge from retirement twice more, both as a favour to Burton, to voice Elder Gutknecht in Corpse Bride and the Dodo in Alice in Wonderland.

== Personal life ==
Gough was married four times. He married his first wife Diana Graves in 1937; their son Simon Peter was born in 1942 and they divorced in 1948. His second wife was Anne Elizabeth Leon (born 1925 and half-sister of actor John Standing). They married in 1950, their daughter Emma Frances was born in 1953 and they divorced in 1962. His third wife was Doctor Who actress Anneke Wills, who portrayed the Doctor's companion Polly. Wills and Gough met at various times during her life, firstly during a theatre trip with her mother in 1952, but they first met formally on the set of Candidate for Murder and the attraction was instant. Gough adopted Wills's daughter Polly and in 1965 their son Jasper was born. Polly died in a car accident in 1982 at the age of 19. Gough married Henrietta Lawrence (his fourth wife) in 1981, and they remained together until his death.

== Death ==
Gough died aged 94 on 17 March 2011 at his home in Ashmore, Dorset. A memorial service was held, he was cremated, and his ashes were scattered in the English Channel. Michael Keaton, who played the title character in the first two theatrical Batman films opposite Gough, paid tribute to him, describing him as sweet and charming, and wrote "To Mick – my butler, my confidant, my friend, my Alfred. I love you. God bless. Michael (Mr. Wayne) Keaton."

Gough was added to In Memoriam at the 18th Screen Actors Guild Awards.

== Awards and nominations ==
Gough won Broadway's 1979 Tony Award as Best Actor (Featured Role – Play) for Bedroom Farce. He was also nominated in the same category in 1988 for Breaking the Code.

In 1957 Gough won the British Academy Television Award for Best Actor, and in 1972 he was nominated for a BAFTA Film Award for his work in The Go-Between.

Gough was nominated for a Drama Desk Award Outstanding Featured Actor in a Play in 1979 for Bedroom Farce and again in 1988 for Breaking the Code.

== Filmography ==
=== Film ===
| Year | Title | Role | Notes |
|---|---|---|---|
| 1948 | Anna Karenina | Nicholai | |
| 1948 | Blanche Fury | Laurence Fury | |
| 1948 | Saraband for Dead Lovers | Prince Charles | |
| 1949 | The Small Back Room | Capt. Dick Stuart | |
| 1950 | Ha'penny Breeze | | Uncredited |
| 1951 | Blackmailed | Maurice Edwards | |
| 1951 | No Resting Place | Alec Kyle | |
| 1951 | The Man in the White Suit | Michael Corland | |
| 1951 | Night Was Our Friend | Martin Raynor | |
| 1953 | Twice Upon a Time | Mr. Lloyd | |
| 1953 | The Sword and the Rose | Duke of Buckingham | |
| 1953 | Rob Roy, the Highland Rogue | Duke of Montrose | |
| 1955 | Richard III | Dighton, the first murderer | |
| 1956 | Reach for the Sky | Flying Instructor Pearson | |
| 1957 | Night Ambush | Andoni Zoidakis | |
| 1957 | The House in the Woods | Geoffrey Carter | |
| 1958 | Dracula | Arthur Holmwood | |
| 1958 | The Horse's Mouth | Abel | |
| 1959 | Model for Murder | Kingsley Beauchamp | |
| 1959 | Horrors of the Black Museum | Edmond Bancroft | |
| 1961 | Konga | Dr. Charles Decker | |
| 1961 | Mr. Topaze | Tamise | |
| 1961 | What a Carve Up! | Fisk, the butler | |
| 1962 | Candidate for Murder | Donald Edwards | Edgar Wallace Mysteries |
| 1962 | The Phantom of the Opera | Ambrose D'Arcy | |
| 1963 | Black Zoo | Michael Conrad | |
| 1963 | Tamahine | Cartwright | |
| 1965 | Game for Three Losers | Robert Hilary | Edgar Wallace Mysteries |
| 1965 | Dr. Terror's House of Horrors | Eric Landor | (segment "Disembodied Hand") |
| 1965 | The Skull | Auctioneer | |
| 1967 | They Came from Beyond Space | Master of the Moon | |
| 1967 | Berserk! | Albert Dorando | |
| 1968 | One Night... A Train | Jeremiah | |
| 1968 | Curse of the Crimson Altar | Elder | Also known as The Crimson Cult |
| 1969 | A Walk with Love and Death | Mad Monk | |
| 1969 | Women in Love | Tom Brangwen | |
| 1970 | Julius Caesar | Metellus Cimber | |
| 1970 | Trog | Sam Murdock | |
| 1971 | The Go-Between | Mr. Maudsley | |
| 1971 | The Corpse | Walter Eastwood | Also known as Crucible of Horror |
| 1972 | Savage Messiah | M. Gaudier | |
| 1972 | Henry VIII and His Six Wives | Norfolk | |
| 1973 | Horror Hospital | Dr. Christian Storm | |
| 1973 | The Legend of Hell House | Emeric Belasco | Uncredited |
| 1975 | Galileo | Sagredo | |
| 1975 | The Man from Nowhere | Man | Voice, Uncredited |
| 1976 | Satan's Slave | Uncle Alexander Yorke | |
| 1978 | The Boys from Brazil | Mr. Harrington | |
| 1978 | L'Amour en question | Sir Baldwin | Credited as Michaël Gough |
| 1981 | Venom | David Ball | |
| 1983 | The Dresser | Frank Carrington | |
| 1984 | Memed My Hawk | Kerimoglu | |
| 1984 | Top Secret! | Dr. Paul Flammond | |
| 1984 | Oxford Blues | Doctor Ambrose | |
| 1985 | Out of Africa | Baron Delamere | |
| 1986 | Caravaggio | Cardinal Del Monte | |
| 1987 | Maschenka | Vater | |
| 1987 | The Fourth Protocol | Sir Bernard Hemmings | |
| 1988 | The Serpent and the Rainbow | Dr. Earl "Schoonie" Schoonbacher | |
| 1988 | Rarg | Professor | Short Film |
| 1989 | Strapless | Douglas Brodie | |
| 1989 | Batman | Alfred Pennyworth | |
| 1989 | Batman: The Lazarus Syndrome | Alfred Pennyworth | Voice |
| 1990 | The Garden | | |
| 1991 | Let Him Have It | Lord Goddard | |
| 1991 | The Wanderer | Veteran Wanderer | Short Film |
| 1992 | Batman Returns | Alfred Pennyworth | |
| 1993 | Wittgenstein | Bertrand Russell | |
| 1993 | The Age of Innocence | Henry van der Luyden | |
| 1993 | The Advocate | Magistrate Boniface | |
| 1994 | Uncovered | Don Manuel | |
| 1994 | Nostradamus | Jean de Remy | |
| 1995 | Batman Forever | Alfred Pennyworth | |
| 1997 | Batman & Robin | Alfred Pennyworth | |
| 1998 | What Rats Won't Do | Justice Tomlin | |
| 1998 | St. Ives | Comte de Saint-Yves | |
| 1998 | The Whisper | Nikolay 1947 | Short Film |
| 1999 | The Cherry Orchard | Feers | |
| 1999 | Sleepy Hollow | Notary James Hardenbrook | |
| 1999 | The Strange Case of Delphina Potocka or The Mystery of Chopin | The Doctor | |
| 2005 | Corpse Bride | Elder Gutknecht | Voice |
| 2010 | Alice in Wonderland | Uilleam the Dodo Bird | Voice; final film role |

=== Television ===
| Year | Title | Role | Notes |
|---|---|---|---|
| 1946 | Androcles and the Lion | Spintho | Television film |
| 1949 | Crime Passionel | Hugo | Television film |
| 1949 | Whitehall Wonders | Stephen Blair | Television film |
| 1950 | Master of Arts | Ronald Knight, MA | Television film |
| 1951 | Androcles and the Lion | Captain | Television film |
| 1951–1956 | BBC Saturday-Night Theatre | Michael / Francis Hubbard / Lt. Geoffrey Ainsworth | 3 episodes |
| 1953 | Wednesday Theatre | Brama-Glinsky | Episode: "Curtain Down" |
| 1954 | The Lover | The Lover | Television short |
| 1954 | Rheingold Theatre | Charlie | Episode: "The Man Who Heard Everything" |
| 1954 | Stage by Stage | Loveless | Episode: "The Relapse or, Virtue in Danger" |
| 1955 | Sherlock Holmes | Mr. Russel Partridge | Episode: "The Case of the Perfect Husband" |
| 1955–1958 | ITV Television Playhouse | Sir David Lavering / David Ryerson / Hugo / Dawson | 5 episodes |
| 1955–1961 | ITV Play of the Week | Rev. Claude Bell / Georges Renaud / Gregers Werle / Rakitin | 4 episodes |
| 1956 | Theatre Royal | The Stranger | Episode: "Just Off Piccadilly" |
| 1956 | Assignment Foreign Legion | Andre La Palme | Episode: "The Outcast" |
| 1956 | Fanny | The Admiral | Television film |
| 1956–1959 | Armchair Theatre | George in 'Double Exit' / The Doctor | 2 episodes |
| 1957 | The Two Mrs. Carrolls | Geoffrey Carroll | Television film |
| 1957 | The Peaceful Inn | Hatlock | Television film |
| 1959 | World Theatre | Cassius | Episode: "Julius Caesar" |
| 1959 | Dancers in Mourning | Squire Mercer | 6 episodes |
| 1960 | DuPont Show of the Month | Dr. Livesey | Episode: "Treasure Island" |
| 1960 | The Adventures of Robin Hood | Boland | Episode: "The Edge and the Point" |
| 1961 | Thirty-Minute Theatre | Currently Unknown | Episode: "A Matter of Principle" |
| 1961 | Rendezvous | Scionneau | Episode: "The Executioner" |
| 1962 | Drama 61-67 | Charles | Episode: "Drama '62: The Lonesome Road" |
| 1962–1965 | The Edgar Wallace Mystery Theatre | Robert Hilary / Donald Edwards | 2 episodes |
| 1964 | The Great War | Various | Episode: "So Sleep Easy in Your Beds" |
| 1964 | The Saint | Colin Phillips | Episode: "The Imprudent Politician" |
| 1964 | The Count of Monte Cristo | Gérard de Villefort | 7 episodes |
| 1964–1967 | Theatre 625 | Harry / Geoffrey Melville / Clodius Pulcher | 3 episodes |
| 1965 | Undermind | Rev. Austen Anderson | Episode: "Flowers of Havoc" |
| 1965 | The Man in Room 17 | Andrei Konev | Episode: "The Seat of Power" |
| 1965 | Sunday Night | Pausanias | Episode: "The Drinking Party" |
| 1965–1967 | The Avengers | Nutski / Dr. Armstrong | Episodes: "The Cybernauts" and "The Correct Way to Kill" |
| 1966 | BBC Play of the Month | Eliut | Episode: "Days to Come" |
| 1966 | Alice in Wonderland | March Hare | Television play |
| 1966 | Doctor Who: The Celestial Toymaker | Celestial Toymaker | 4 episodes, episodes 1-3 animated/missing |
| 1966–1967 | Orlando | Harry Prentice | 5 episodes |
| 1967 | Pride and Prejudice | Mr. Bennet | 6 episodes |
| 1968 | Thirty-Minute Theatre | Ted Warner | Episode: "Standing by for Santa Claus" |
| 1968 | Detective | Holroyd | Episode: "Lesson in Anatomy" |
| 1968 | For Amusement Only | Henry | Episode: "Henry the Incredible Bore" |
| 1968 | Journey to the Unknown | Royal | Episode: "Eve" |
| 1968 | The Champions | Major Joss | Episode: "Happening" |
| 1968 | Treasure Island | Squire Trelawney | 7 episodes |
| 1969–1972 | Omnibus | Vincent van Gogh / Astronaut | 2 episodes |
| 1971 | Seeing and Believing | Job | Episode: "The Trial of Job" |
| 1971 | Kate | Alan Tatley | Episode: "Good and Proper" |
| 1971 | The Search for the Nile | David Livingstone | 3 episodes |
| 1972 | Spy Trap | Cooper | Episode: "Who Among Us?: Part 6" |
| 1972 | The Main Chance | Sir George Andrews | Episode: "One for the House" |
| 1972 | Colditz | Major Schaeffer | Episode: "Maximum Security" |
| 1972 | The Man Who Came to Dinner | Beverly Carlton | Television film |
| 1973 | The Protectors | Shkodër | Episode: "One and One Makes One" |
| 1973 | The Rivals of Sherlock Holmes | Governor | Episode: "Cell 13" |
| 1973 | Moonbase 3 | Sir Benjamin Dyce | Episode: "View of a Dead Planet" |
| 1973–1983 | Crown Court | Mr. Justice Galbraith / Justice Galbraith / Dr. De Quincey | 3 Episodes |
| 1974 | QB VII | Dr. Fletcher | Episode: "Part Three" |
| 1974 | Shoulder to Shoulder | Dr. Richard Pankhurst | 2 episodes |
| 1974 | Fall of Eagles | Helphand | Episode: "The Secret War" |
| 1974 | Late Night Drama | Potter | Episode: "A Brisk Dip Sagaciously Considered" |
| 1974 | ITV Playhouse | Bill Wakely | Episode: "The Gift of Friendship" |
| 1974 | Microbes and Men | Sir Almroth Wright | Episode: "The Search for the Magic Bullet" |
| 1974 | Notorious Woman | Henri de Latouche | Episode: "Success" |
| 1974 | Jennie: Lady Randolph Churchill | Mr. Yule | Episode: "Lady Randolph" |
| 1975 | Sutherland's Law | James Shaw | Episode: "In at The Deep End" |
| 1975 | Ten from the Twenties | Peter | Episode: "The Fifty Pound Note" |
| 1975–1976 | Centre Play | Father / Matt | 2 episodes |
| 1976 | Shades of Greene | Ransom | Episode: "The Case for the Defence" |
| 1976 | Life and Death of Penelope | Winthrop | Episode: "The Reaper" |
| 1979 | Suez 1956 | Sir Anthony Eden | Television film |
| 1980 | Blake's 7 | Hower | Episode: "Volcano" |
| 1981 | Brideshead Revisited | Doctor Grant | Episode: "Brideshead Revisited" |
| 1982 | Barriers | Old man | Episode: "#2.6" |
| 1982 | Inside the Third Reich | Dr. Rust | Television film |
| 1982 | Smiley's People | Mikhel | Television Miniseries |
| 1982 | The Agatha Christie Hour | Sir George Durand | Episode: "The Fourth Man" |
| 1982 | Strangers | Professor Whittingham | Episode: "The Lost Chord" |
| 1982 | Witness for the Prosecution | Judge | Television film |
| 1982 | Play for Today | Professor Burrows | Episode: "Another Flip for Dominick" |
| 1982 | Cymbeline | Belarius | Television Film |
| 1983 | Doctor Who: Arc of Infinity | Councillor Hedin | 3 episodes |
| 1983 | To the Lighthouse | Mr. Ramsay | Television film |
| 1983 | The Citadel | Sir Jenner Halliday | Episode: "Part 10" |
| 1983 | Andy Robson | Arthur | 2 episodes |
| 1983 | Heartattack Hotel | Mr. Todd | Television film |
| 1984 | Mistral's Daughter | Cardinal | 3 episodes |
| 1984 | The Biko Inquest | Professor Loubser / State Pathologist | Television film |
| 1984 | A Christmas Carol | Mr. Poole | Television film |
| 1985 | Arthur the King | Archbishop | Television film |
| 1985 | Hilary | Hilary's Dad | Episode: "#1.4" |
| 1985 | Lace II | Unnamed Character | Television film |
| 1986 | Screen Two | Peter | Episode: "Hard Travelling" |
| 1986 | Ladies in Charge | Arthur James | Episode: "Dangerous Prelude" |
| 1986–1987 | The Little Vampire | Uncle Theodor / Uncle Ludwig | 7 episodes |
| 1987 | Inspector Morse | Philip Ogleby | Episode: "The Silent World of Nicholas Quinn" |
| 1987 | A Killing on the Exchange | Charles Makepeace | 2 episodes |
| 1987 | Screenplay | Albani | Episode: "Cariani and the Courtesans" |
| 1988 | Ten Great Writers of the Modern World | Reader | Episode: "T. S. Eliot's The Waste Land" |
| 1989 | Mystery!: Campion | Mr. Hayhoe | 2 episodes |
| 1989 | After the War | Professor Charlie Rampling | Episode: "Rise and Fall" |
| 1989 | Screen One | Mr. Maggs | Episode: "The Mountain and the Molehill" |
| 1989 | The Shell Seekers | Roy Brookner | Television film |
| 1989 | Blackeyes | Maurice James Kingsley | 4 episodes |
| 1990 | Boon | Donald Bannerman | Episode: "Best Left Buried" |
| 1991 | The Diamond Brothers | Mr. Waverly | 6 episodes |
| 1991 | Sleepers | Andrei Zorin | 4 episodes |
| 1991 | Children of the North | Arthur Apple | 4 episodes |
| 1992 | The Good Guys | Hector | Episode: "The MacQuarrie Treasure" |
| 1995 | A Village Affair | Sir Ralph Unwin | Television film |
| 1995 | The Haunting of Helen Walker | Barnaby | Television film |
| 1996 | Young Indiana Jones: Travels with Father | Leo Tolstoy | Television film |

| First actor | The Toymaker actor 1966 | Succeeded by Neil Patrick Harris |
| Preceded by Hugh Sinclair | Mr. Bennett actor from Pride and Prejudice; 1967 | Succeeded by David Rintoul |
| Preceded by Alan Napier | Alfred Pennyworth Actor; 1989 – 1997 | Succeeded by Michael Caine |
