= The Correct Way to Kill =

- The Avengers episode
- Episode no.: Season 5 Episode 9
- Directed by: Charles Crichton
- Written by: Brian Clemens (teleplay)
- Original air dates: 8 March 1967 (Southern Television); 11 March 1967 (ABC Weekend TV)

Guest appearances
- Anna Quayle; Michael Gough; Philip Madoc; Terence Alexander

Episode chronology
← Previous "The Hidden Tiger"	Next → "Never, Never Say Die"

"The Correct Way to Kill" is the ninth episode of the fifth series of the 1960s cult British spy-fi television series The Avengers, starring Patrick Macnee and Diana Rigg, and guest starring Anna Quayle, Michael Gough, Philip Madoc, and Terence Alexander. It was first broadcast in the Southern and Tyne Tees regions of the ITV network on Wednesday 8 March 1967. ABC Weekend Television, who commissioned the show for ITV, broadcast it in its own regions three days later on Saturday 11 March. The episode was directed by Charles Crichton, and written by Brian Clemens.

== Plot ==
Soviet agents are being hunted down and killed by sharp dressed villains prompting Steed and Emma to team up with Soviet agents Olga and Nutski.

== Cast ==
- Patrick Macnee as John Steed
- Diana Rigg as Emma Peel
- Anna Quayle as Olga
- Michael Gough as Nutski
- Philip Madoc as Ivan
- Terence Alexander as Ponsonby
- Peter Barkworth as Percy
- Graham Armitage as Algy
- Timothy Bateson as Merryweather
- Joanna Jones as Hilda
- Edwin Apps as Winters
- John G. Heller as Groski
