= Nicolas Freeling =

British novelist (1927–2003)

Nicolas Freeling (born Nicolas Davidson; 3 March 1927 – 20 July 2003), was a British crime novelist, best known as the author of the "Van der Valk" series of detective novels. A television series based on the character, Van der Valk, was produced for the British ITV network by Thames Television during the 1970s and was revived in 1991–92; a remake with new cast, characters, and storylines was launched in 2020 as Van der Valk.

== Biography ==
Freeling was born in London, but travelled widely, and ended his life at his long-standing home at Grandfontaine to the west of Strasbourg. He had followed a variety of occupations, including the armed services and the catering profession. He began writing during a three-week prison sentence, after being convicted of taking home some veal from a restaurant where he worked, though that was common practice in the restaurant trade.

Freeling got bored with writing about his Amsterdam detective Van der Valk and killed him off in 1972, when the character was shot while following up a rather unpromising lead. Freeling refused to bring the detective back to life and wrote two novels in which his widow Arlette is the detective. Then he started his second detective series, about a French police inspector, Henri Castang to revive his failing income. He eventually revived Van der Valk with Sand Castles (1989).

Freeling's The King of the Rainy Country received a 1967 Edgar Award, from the Mystery Writers of America, for Best Novel.

His novel Gun Before Butter won France's Grand Prix de Littérature Policière and was a runner-up for the UK Crime Writers' Association's 1963 Gold Dagger Award.

In 1968 Freeling's novel Love in Amsterdam was adapted as the film Amsterdam Affair directed by Gerry O'Hara and starring Wolfgang Kieling as Van der Valk.

A radio drama of his Henri Castang novel The Night Lords adapted by Michael Bakewell was made in 1990 starring Keith Barron, Richard Vernon, and Edita Brychta as part of the BBC Radio 4 Saturday Night Theatre series.

== Works ==
=== Novels ===
==== Van der Valk series ====
- Love in Amsterdam (1962), a.k.a. Death in Amsterdam
- Because of the Cats (1963)
- Gun Before Butter (1963), a.k.a. Question of Loyalty
- Double-Barrel (1964)
- Criminal Conversation (1965)
- The King of the Rainy Country (1966)
- Strike Out Where Not Applicable (1967)
- Tsing-Boum! (1969)
- Over the High Side (1971), a.k.a. The Lovely Ladies
- A Long Silence (1972), a.k.a. Auprès de ma Blonde
- Sand Castles (1989)

===== Adaptations =====
====== Television ======
Created by Freeling, the British television crime drama Van der Valk is an adaptation of the novels. It premiered on ITV and ran from 1972 to 1992. Van der Valk (2020 TV series), also produced for ITV, is a remake of the original programme.

====== Film ======
- Amsterdam Affair (1968), a lesser-known British film, with German actor Wolfgang Kieling in the title role.
- Pas de frontières pour l'inspecteur (Van der Valk), three French-West German co-produced TV films, starring Frank Finlay in the title role:
  - Van der Valk und das Mädchen (Le milieu n'est pas tendre) (1972), based on the novel Gun Before Butter, directed by Peter Zadek.
  - Van der Valk und die Reichen (Discrétion absolue) (1973), based on the novel The King of the Rainy Country, directed by Wolfgang Petersen.
  - Van der Valk und die Toten (Le bouc émissaire) (1975), based on the novel Double-Barrel, directed by Marcel Cravenne.
- Because of the Cats (1973), a Dutch/Belgian co-production, starring British actor Bryan Marshall in the title role.

====== Radio ======
Adapted for BBC Radio:

- Gun Before Butter (1993) - Starring Ian Hogg as Van der Valk and Sophie Thompson as Lucienne.
- King of the Rainy Country (1994) - Starring Martin Jarvis as Van der Valk.
- Arlette and The Widow (1999) - Starring Stella Gonet as Arlette Van der Valk and Nigel Anthony as Piet Van der Valk.

===== Featuring Arlette Van der Valk =====
- The Widow (1979)
- One Damn Thing After Another (1981), a.k.a. Arlette

==== Henri Castang series ====
- Dressing of Diamond (1974)
- What are the Bugles Blowing For? (1975), a.k.a. The Bugles Blowing
- Lake Isle (1976), a.k.a. Sabine
- The Night Lords (1978)
- Castang's City (1980)
- Wolfnight (1982)
- The Back of the North Wind (1983)
- No Part in Your Death (1984)
- Cold Iron (1986)
- Lady Macbeth (1988)
- Not as Far as Velma (1989)
- Those in Peril (1990)
- Flanders Sky (1992), a.k.a. The Pretty How Town
- You Who Know (1994)
- The Seacoast of Bohemia (1994)
- A Dwarf Kingdom (1996)

In 1990 Not as Far as Velma was adapted as a six-part BBC Radio serial starring Keith Barron as Castang.

==== Other novels ====
- Valparaiso (1964, 1. edition as by F. R. E. Nicolas)
- The Dresden Green (1966)
- This is the Castle (1968)
- Gadget (1977)
- A City Solitary (1984)
- One More River (1998)
- Some Day Tomorrow (1999)
- The Janeites (2002)

=== Non-fiction ===
- The Kitchen (1970)
- Cook Book (1972)
- Criminal Convictions (1994)
- The Village Book (2001)
- The Kitchen and the Cook (2002)
