= Pamela Ann Davy =

Australian actress (1933–2018)

- Born: 7 September 1933; Australia
- Died: 3 June 2018 (aged 84); Hobart, Tasmania, Australia
- Education: RADA
- Occupation: Actress
- Years active: 1956–1981
- Spouse: Geoffrey Lyndon Archer (m. 1971; died 2014)
- Children: 1

Pamela Ann Davy (7 September 1933 – 3 June 2018) was an Australian actress, best known for her roles on British television during the 1960s. After graduating from RADA in 1960, and after early repertory experience, she appeared in many popular TV shows of the day. She married racing car driver Geoffrey Lyndon Archer in 1971, and lived latterly in suburban Hobart, Tasmania, Australia until her death on 3 June 2018, aged 84.

== Selected filmography ==
=== Television ===
- Doctor Who (in the serial The Power of the Daleks)
- The Avengers (in the Episodes "Mission to Montreal" & "The Living Dead")
- No Hiding Place
- The Saint
- Department S
- Freewheelers
- The First Churchills
- Fatty and George (Credited as Pamela Archer)

=== Film ===
- More Deadly than the Male (1959)
- Change Partners (Edgar Wallace Mysteries 1965) -Jean
- Be My Guest (1965) (Credited as Pamela Ann Davies)
- Amsterdam Affair (1968)
