= Amsterdam Affair =

1968 British film by Gerry O'Hara

- UK lobby card
- Directed by: Gerry O'Hara
- Screenplay by: Edmund Ward
- Story by: Gerry O'Hara (Adaptation)
- Based on: Love in Amsterdam by Nicolas Freeling
- Produced by: George Willoughby
- Starring: Wolfgang Kieling; William Marlowe; Catherine Schell; Pamela Ann Davy
- Cinematography: Gerry Fisher
- Edited by: Barry Peters
- Music by: Patrick John Scott
- Production companies: Trio Films; Group W Films
- Distributed by: London Independent Producers
- Release date: 9 June 1968
- Running time: 91 minutes
- Countries: United Kingdom; United States
- Language: English

Amsterdam Affair (also known as Love in Amsterdam) is a 1968 British crime film directed by Gerry O'Hara and starring Wolfgang Kieling, William Marlowe, Catherine Schell and Pamela Ann Davy. It was written by Edward Ward based on the 1968 novel Love in Amsterdam by Nicolas Freeling.

== Plot ==
Dutch policeman Van Der Valk investigates a novelist who is accused of murdering his mistress.

== Cast ==
- Wolfgang Kieling as Van der Valk
- William Marlowe as Martin Ray
- Catherine Schell as Sophie Ray
- Pamela Ann Davy as Elsa de Charmoy
- J.A.B. Dubin-Behrmann as Eric
- Guy Deghy as Will Munch
- Lo van Hensbergen as Magistrate

== Production ==
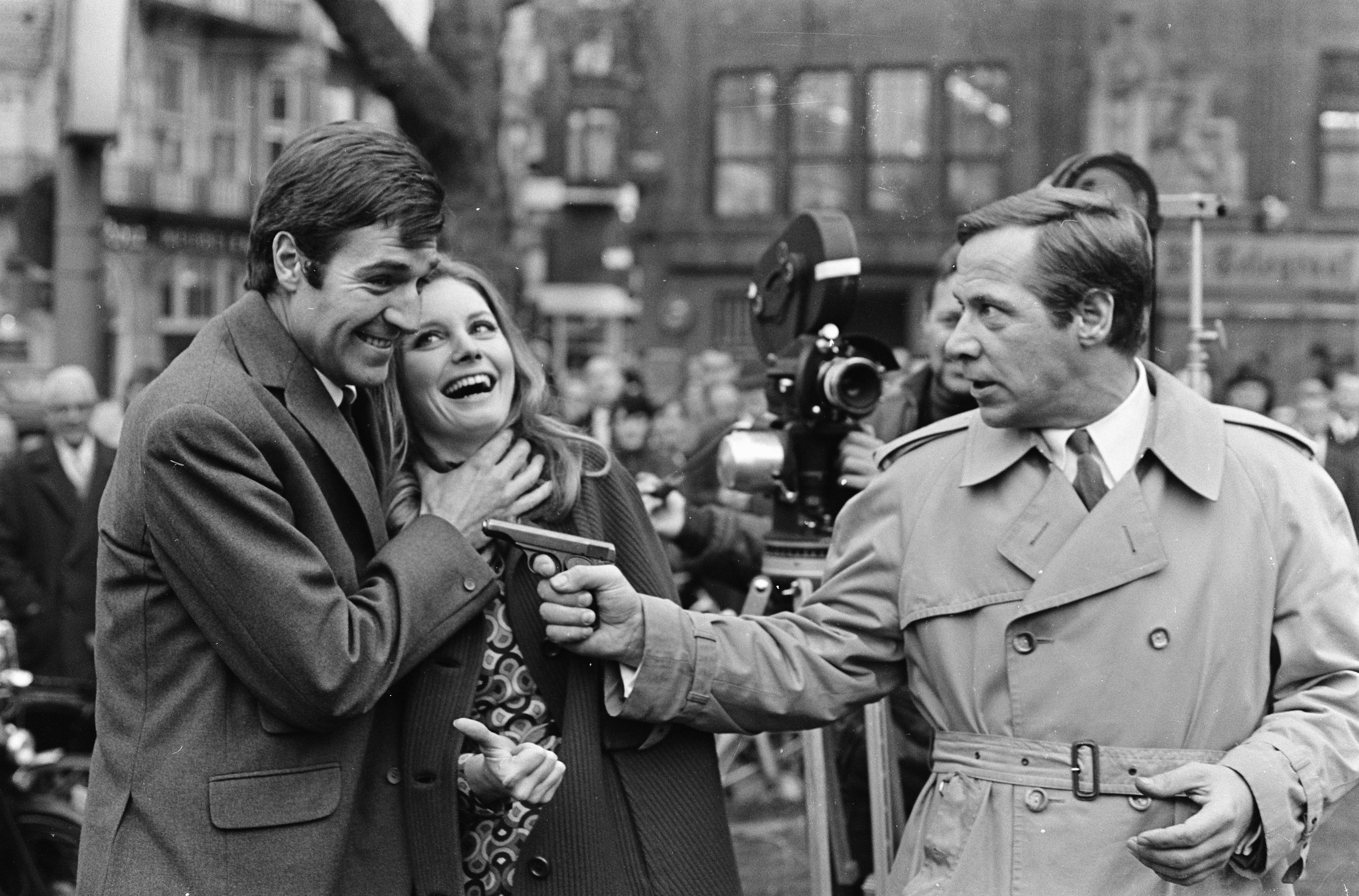
Publicity Still for Amsterdam Affair, Guido de Moor (left) pretends to choke Catharine von Schell (center), as Piet Römer (right) threatens Guido de Moor with a gun, on Rembrandtplein in central Amsterdam, on 15 November 1967

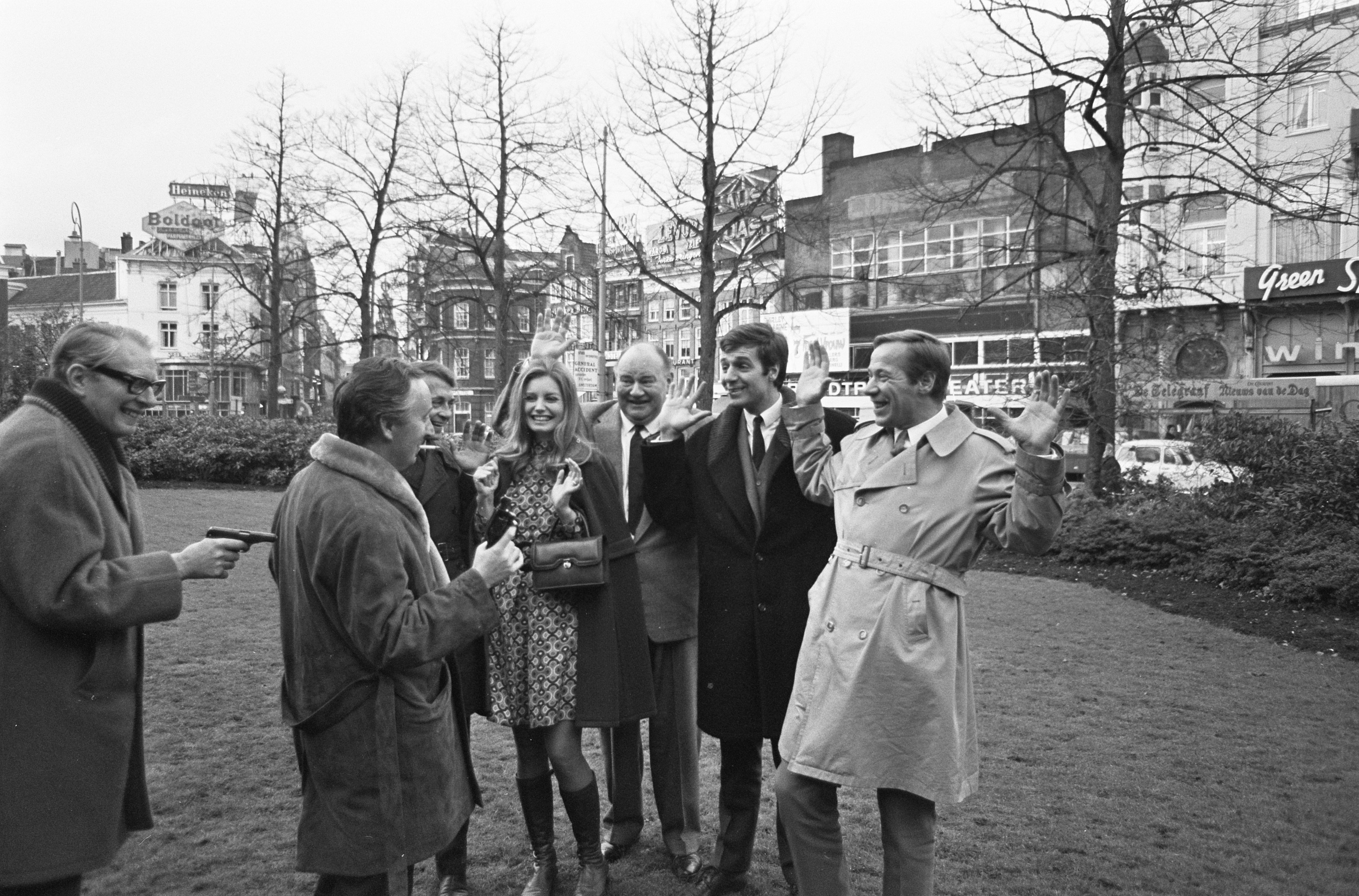
Publicity Still for Amsterdam Affair

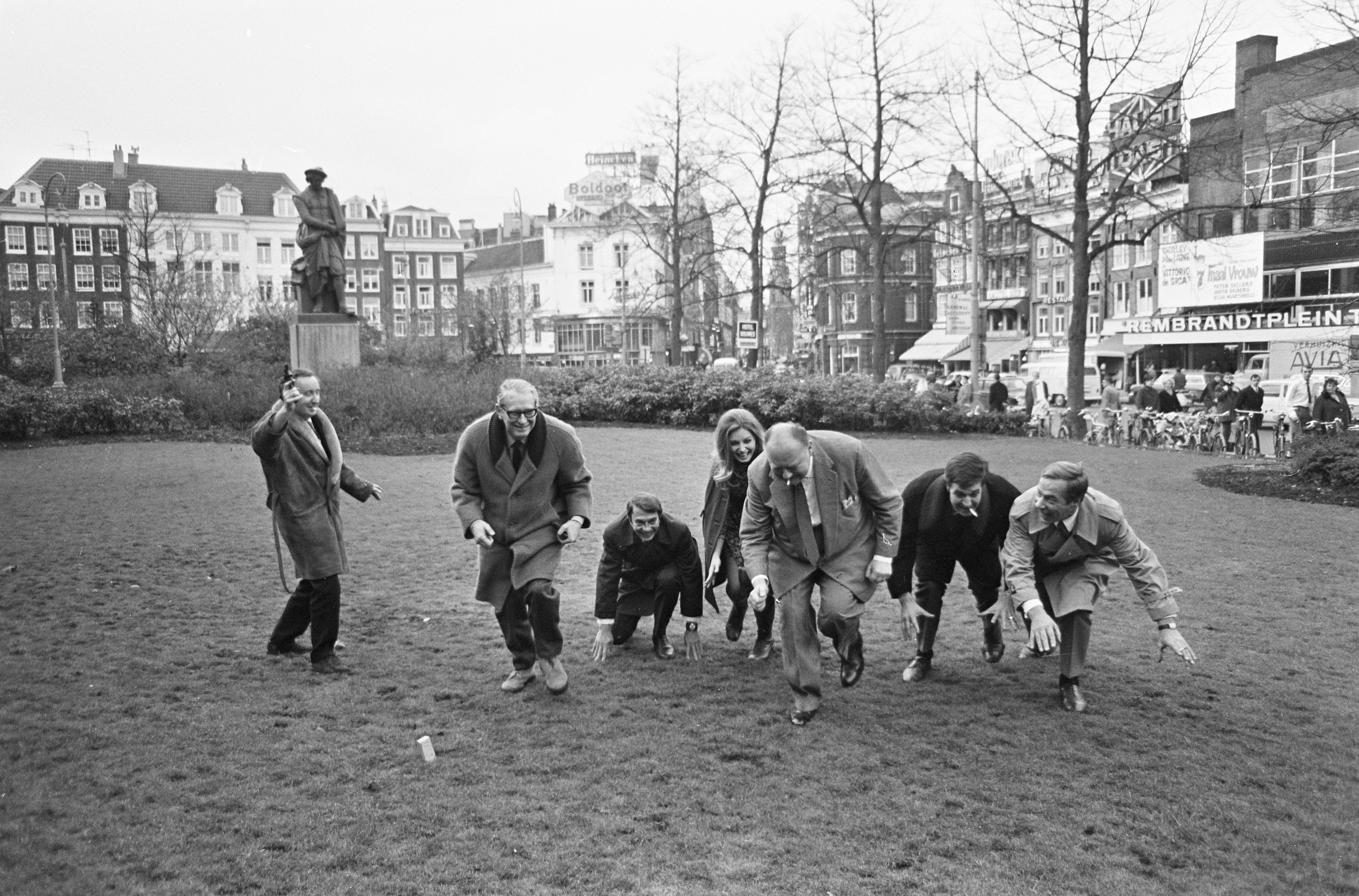
Publicity Still for Amsterdam Affair

Gerry O'Hara was under contract to Sydney Box when signed to direct. He also wrote the script. He said the producers tried to remove him from the film as a director, but could not as O'Hara had written the script and was not under contract as a writer. "It's a film I like enormously," said O'Hara.

== Reception ==
The Monthly Film Bulletin wrote: "Despite its rather wordy script and the time it takes to get under way, this thriller is not altogether without style. The copious dialogue is well enough written to sustain interest, the Amsterdam locations are attractively photographed, and Wolfgang Kieling is engagingly quizzical as the Maigret-like police inspector."

Kine Weekly wrote: "An ingenious and well-written mystery, this is drawn out a little too long, but should commend itself in most situations. ...The film contains far more talk than action, but it is well-constructed, natural- sounding dialogue and all the main characters are well drawn. There is, perhaps, too much use of memory flashbacks and some of the incidentals are given far more time than their iinterest deserves; but the mystery and tension are on at a reasonable pitch throughout by playing om the duel of personalities between Martin and Inspector Van der Valk."

Variety wrote: "William Marlowe gives a sound, convincing performance as the bewildered, slightly arrogant suspect, and Catherine Von Schell as the wife, Pamela Ann Davy as the victim and Lo Van Hensbergen as the unctuous magistrate shape well together with a predominately Dutch cast. But the most interesting thesping comes from Wolfgang Kieling as the sardonic, sadistic but painstaking detective. A neat score by Johnny Scott and other technical credits measure up."

Leslie Halliwell wrote "Tolerable roman policier."
