= William Marlowe =

English actor (1930–2003)

- in Robbery (1967)
- Born: William James Marlowe; 25 July 1930; London, England
- Died: 31 January 2003 (aged 72); Carmarthen, Carmarthenshire, Wales
- Occupation: Actor
- Spouse(s): Linda Marlowe (m. 1958; div. 1967) Catherine Schell (m. 1968; div. 1977) Kismet Delgado (m. 1983)

William Marlowe (25 July 1930 – 31 January 2003) was an English theatre, television and film actor.

He served in the Fleet Air Arm and hoped for a career as a writer before training as an actor at RADA.

He was cast in A Family at War (1970–72), as Sir Guy of Gisbourne in The Legend of Robin Hood (1975), as Brian Kettle in Rooms (1977), and as DCI Bill Russell in The Gentle Touch (1980–84). He appeared twice in Doctor Who, as Mailer in The Mind of Evil in 1971, and as Lester in Revenge of the Cybermen in 1975. His guest star roles include Special Branch (1974), Barlow (1975), Breakaway (1980), Callan (1972) and Catch Hand (1964). Later he played Chief Supt. Thomas in The Chief (1990).

== Personal Life ==
He was married to actress Linda Marlowe (née Bathurst) from 1958 until 1967, to actress Catherine Schell from 1968 until 1977, and to Kismet Delgado (née Shahani), the widow of actor Roger Delgado, from 1983 until his death in 2003, aged 72.

== Filmography ==
Year	Title	Role	Notes
1960	Tunes of Glory	Officer #9	
1962	Play It Cool	Cab Driver	Uncredited
1962	A Prize of Arms	Sgt. Ward	
1963	A Place to Go	Charlie Batey	
1965	The Heroes of Telemark	Claus	
1966	The Uncle	Wayne	
1967	Robbery	Dave Aitken	
1968	Amsterdam Affair	Martin Ray	
1969	Where's Jack?	Tom Sheppard	
1969	The Royal Hunt of the Sun	Candia	
1971	Journey to Murder	Randolph Verdew (The Killing Bottle)	
1971	Zeppelin	Anderson	
1976	Nosey Dobson	Jerry	
1980	The Gentle Touch	Det Ch Insp Bill Russell	
1985	Revolution	Sgt. Marley	
1987	Cry Freedom	Police captain at Soweto	
