= Matthew Woolgar =

English footballer (born 1976)

Personal information
- Full name: Matthew Woolgar
- Date of birth: 5 January 1976 (age 50)
- Place of birth: Bedford, Bedfordshire, England
- Position: Forward

Senior career*
Years	Team	Apps	(Gls)
1993–1994	Luton Town	0	(0)
1994	Baldock Town	?	(?)
1994	Merthyr Tydfil	?	(?)
- * Club domestic league appearances and goals

Matthew Woolgar (born 5 January 1976) is an English retired footballer who played for Luton Town, Baldock Town and Merthyr Tydfil.

== Club career ==
=== Luton Town ===
Woolgar started his career with Luton Town. On 7 September 1993, he made his only appearance for Luton in the 1993–94 Anglo-Italian Cup where he replaced John Hartson in the 1–1 draw with Southend United.

=== Later career ===
Woolgar moved into non-league football following his spell with Luton and went on to play for Baldock Town and Merthyr Tydfil.
