= Hell Bent (Doctor Who) =

262 – "Hell Bent"
- Doctor Who episode

Cast
- Doctor: Peter Capaldi – Twelfth Doctor
- Companion: Jenna Coleman – Clara Oswald
- Others: Donald Sumpter – The President; Ken Bones – The General; Maisie Williams – Ashildr; T'Nia Miller – Female General; Malachi Kirby – Gastron; Clare Higgins – Ohila; Linda Broughton – The Woman; Martin T. Sherman – Man; Jami Reid-Quarrell, Nick Ash, Ross Mullen – Wraiths; Nicholas Briggs – Voice of the Dalek

Production
- Directed by: Rachel Talalay
- Written by: Steven Moffat
- Produced by: Peter Bennett
- Executive producers: Steven Moffat; Brian Minchin
- Music by: Murray Gold
- Series: Series 9
- Running time: 61 minutes
- First broadcast: 5 December 2015

Chronology
← Preceded by "Heaven Sent"	Followed by → "The Husbands of River Song"

"Hell Bent" is the twelfth and final episode of the ninth series of the British science fiction television series Doctor Who. It was written by Steven Moffat, directed by Rachel Talalay and first broadcast on BBC One on 5 December 2015.

In the episode, the alien time traveller known as the Doctor (Peter Capaldi) arrives on the planet Gallifrey after escaping imprisonment by his people, the Time Lords, and takes over as the new President. He tries in vain to use knowledge of "the Hybrid", which is prophesied by the Time Lords to stand in Gallifrey's ruins and unravel the Web of Time, to save the life of his companion Clara (Jenna Coleman). Doing so causes the Doctor and Clara themselves to become the Hybrid. This episode is Coleman's final regular appearance as a companion.

The episode was watched by 6.17 million viewers and received positive reviews. Aspects that were met with praise were the episode’s unpredictability, emotion and the performances of Capaldi and Coleman.

== Plot ==
Clip of the Doctor and Clara from "Hell Bent"

On Gallifrey, the Twelfth Doctor has escaped from his confession dial (Note: Referred to in the 2015 episodes "The Magician's Apprentice" and "Face the Raven" as the Doctor's "last will and testament".) after four and a half billion years of imprisonment, alerting the Time Lords. Aided by the Gallifreyan military, the Doctor usurps and exiles Lord President Rassilon. Now acting as new President, the Doctor learns that Rassilon imprisoned him in the dial to force him to confess about the Hybrid, which is prophesied by the Time Lords to stand in Gallifrey's ruins and unravel the Web of Time.

The Doctor has the Time Lords retrieve Clara from her timeline the instant before her death, (Note: Clara dies on a London trap street in the 2015 episode "Face the Raven".) with her biological processes suspended in a time loop, leaving her without a pulse, ostensibly so the Doctor can consult her about the Hybrid. The Doctor turns against the Time Lords and shoots the General fatally, leading him to regenerate into a female form. The Doctor then flees with Clara and steals a TARDIS from the workshops under the Capitol, telling her he held out confessing to have something to bargain for her life with.

The Doctor attempts to take Clara far enough away in the hope that her pulse will resume and she will not have to be returned to the moment of her death, despite potentially damaging time itself in the process. When this fails, they go to the extreme end of the universe. The Doctor finds the immortal human Ashildr waiting in the ruins of Gallifrey. Ashildr theorises that the Doctor and Clara together are the Hybrid. Since they are so alike, each pushes the other to potentially catastrophic actions. The Doctor reveals his intention to erase Clara's memories of him with a neural block taken from Gallifrey, hoping that the Time Lords will not be able to find her. Overhearing them, Clara attempts to reverse the neural block to backfire on the Doctor; Clara accepts her death, but insists on retaining her memory. The two agree to activate the neural block together, not knowing if Clara succeeded at reversing it. The Doctor concedes that he became the Hybrid by trying to save Clara.

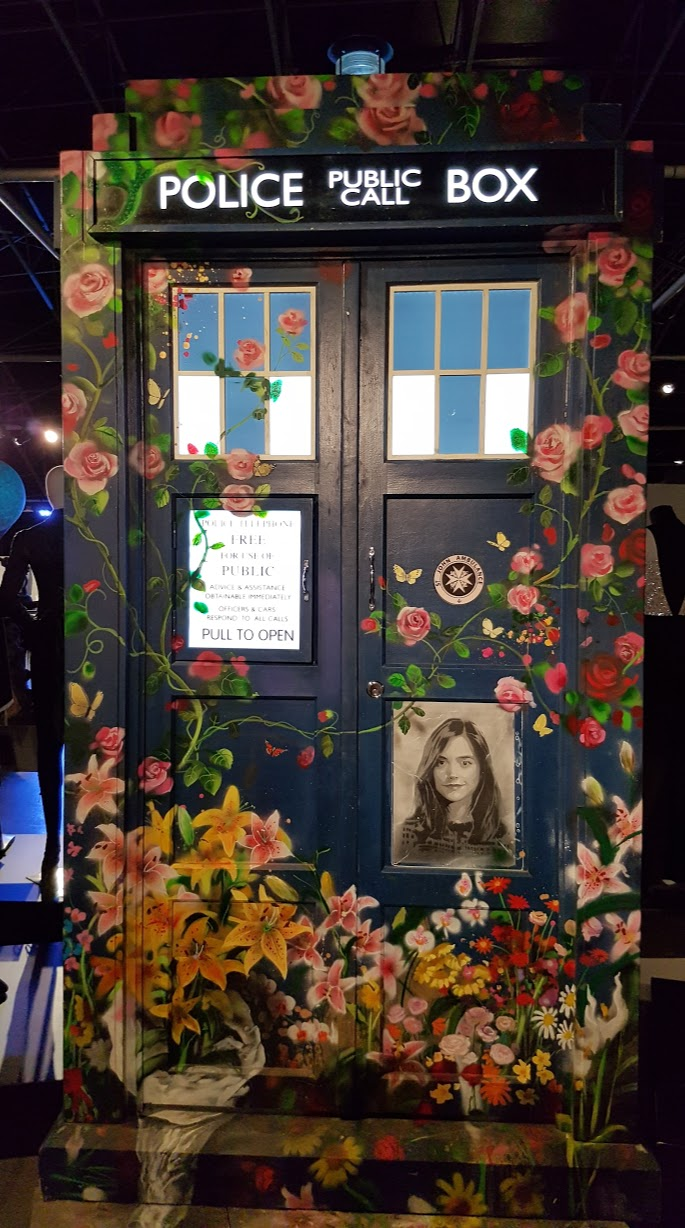
The painted TARDIS at the Doctor Who Experience

The Doctor's memories of Clara are erased. He awakens in the Nevada desert, alone. In a diner, the Doctor tells his story about Gallifrey to Clara, working as a waitress there to check up on the Doctor after his memory-wipe. The Doctor doesn't recognise her face or voice as he has pieced together the hole left by the wipe aside from how Clara appears. After Clara leaves the room, the whole diner dematerialises, leaving the Doctor behind and revealing the Doctor's TARDIS. Travelling with Ashildr in a TARDIS stolen from Gallifrey, Clara begins her trip to Gallifrey to return to her death, "the long way 'round". The Doctor's TARDIS produces a new sonic screwdriver.

=== Continuity ===
The interior of the TARDIS that the Doctor and Clara steal to escape the Cloisters is modelled on the original, as seen in An Unearthly Child (1963). This is the first episode since "The End of Time" (2009–10) to feature Rassilon. Clara uses the phrase "reversed the polarity" in modifying the memory wiping device; this is a phrase commonly associated with the Third Doctor, but has been used by other Doctors as well. The Doctor, once on Gallifrey, travels to the same barn in the Dry Lands where he spent time as a child, as seen in "Listen", and would later be where he debates the use of the Moment in "The Day of the Doctor" (2013).

Before deciding that the Doctor and Clara, combined, are the Hybrid, Ashildr postulated that the Doctor might be half-human and thus the Hybrid. The Eighth Doctor made a similar statement about his lineage in the 1996 television movie. When Ashildr knocks on the TARDIS's door, she knocks four times, which the Doctor points out. This is a reference to the Tenth Doctor's regeneration and the prophecy stating "He will knock four times" just before his death. When the Doctor decides to wipe Clara's memory of himself to save her, he mentions that he has done it before, telepathically, referring to the Tenth Doctor's wiping of Donna Noble's memory of him and her travels in the TARDIS in "Journey's End" (2008).

The Cloister Wars were mentioned by Missy in "The Magician's Apprentice", along with the Doctor stealing "the moon and the President's wife." The Doctor sets the record straight in this episode (albeit inadvertently in his babbling when reunited with Clara after over four billion years), claiming that it was his daughter, not his wife, and that he did not steal the moon, he 'lost' it. The Doctor claims he rescued Clara because he has "a duty of care", a phrase mentioned before.

Foxes' version of "Don't Stop Me Now" is heard playing when the Doctor first walks into the diner; the song was also used in "Mummy on the Orient Express". The Doctor, while talking to the waitress, plays on an electric guitar, and at times plays variations on both Clara's theme, as composed by Murray Gold and heard first in "Asylum of the Daleks", and the "Bad Wolf" leitmotif.

== Production ==
The read through for the episode took place on 4 August 2015, and filming began on 10 August 2015 and concluded 2 days later. The external scenes were shot in Fuerteventura.

The diner at the end of the episode was previously used in the Eleventh Doctor story "The Impossible Astronaut".

=== Cast notes ===
Maisie Williams, who played Ashildr in "The Girl Who Died", "The Woman Who Lived" and "Face the Raven", appeared in this episode, as did Ken Bones, who reprised his role from "The Day of the Doctor" and Clare Higgins, who played Ohila. Timothy Dalton, who had previously played Rassilon in "The End of Time", was asked to reprise the role but was unavailable for filming. Donald Sumpter previously appeared as Enrico Casali in The Wheel in Space (1968) and as Commander Ridgeway in The Sea Devils (1972). He also appeared in The Eternity Trap (2009), a story from spin-off series The Sarah Jane Adventures, playing Erasmus Darkening. Jami Reid-Quarrell returned as a Wraith, after previously playing Colony Sarff in "The Magician's Apprentice" / "The Witch's Familiar", as well as the Veil in "Heaven Sent".

== Reception ==
The episode was watched by 4.47 million viewers overnight in the UK, a 20.0% audience share. It received an Appreciation Index score of 82. The final figures were 6.17 million viewers with a 25.7% audience share.

=== Critical reception ===
Professional ratings
Aggregate scores
Source	Rating
Rotten Tomatoes (Average Score)	8.05
Rotten Tomatoes (Tomatometer)	86%
Review scores
Source	Rating
The A.V. Club	A−
Paste Magazine	9.0
SFX Magazine	3.5/5 stars
TV Fanatic	3.2/5 stars
IGN	9.3
New York Magazine	5/5 stars
Radio Times	5/5 stars

"Hell Bent" received positive reviews from critics. The episode received a score of 86% on Rotten Tomatoes, with an average score of 8.05/10. The site's consensus reads "'Hell Bent' swerves from the expected storyline for the finale, and instead delivers a heartfelt resolution for The Doctor and his companion".

In his review for Digital Spy, Morgan Jeffery said the episode was "at points thrilling and affecting" but "it's the shaky climax that people will remember, and unfortunately that could end up overshadowing the episode's (many and various) good points." Den of Geek's Simon Brew thought the episode was "a coherent, nerdy, often brilliant, sometimes a little frustrating, but always watchable piece of television". Amy Burns of the Independent found it to be "an emotional and humorous episode" although she admitted "not understanding about half of what happened."
