= Face the Raven =

260 – "Face the Raven"
- Doctor Who episode

Cast
- Doctor: Peter Capaldi – Twelfth Doctor
- Companion: Jenna Coleman – Clara Oswald
- Others: Maisie Williams – Ashildr; Joivan Wade – Rigsy; Naomi Ackie – Jen; Simon Manyonda – Kabel; Simon Paisley Day – Rump; Letitia Wright – Anahson; Robin Soans – Chronolock Guy; Angela Clerkin – Alien Woman; Caroline Boulton – Habrian Woman; Jenny Lee – Elderly Woman

Production
- Directed by: Justin Molotnikov
- Written by: Sarah Dollard
- Produced by: Nikki Wilson
- Executive producers: Steven Moffat; Brian Minchin
- Music by: Murray Gold
- Series: Series 9
- Running time: 47 minutes
- First broadcast: 21 November 2015

Chronology
← Preceded by "Sleep No More"	Followed by → "Heaven Sent"

"Face the Raven" is the tenth episode of the ninth series of the British science fiction television series Doctor Who. It was first broadcast on BBC One on 21 November 2015, and was written by Sarah Dollard and directed by Justin Molotnikov.

In the episode, the alien time traveller the Twelfth Doctor (Peter Capaldi) is lured to a hidden trap street populated by extraterrestrial refugees in the centre of London after a death sentence, in the form of a countdown tattoo, has been placed on the Doctor's friend Rigsy (Joivan Wade) by Me (Maisie Williams), the street's mayor. In an attempt to buy more time, the Doctor's companion Clara (Jenna Coleman) puts her life in danger by having the tattoo transferred to her.

The episode was watched by 6.05 million viewers and received positive reviews from critics, who praised the performances of Capaldi and Coleman.

== Plot ==
Rigsy contacts the Twelfth Doctor and Clara for help. He shows them a number tattoo on his neck, counting down, with no memory of how he got it or the events of the last day. They trace his movements to a trap street in present-day London that houses extraterrestrial refugees, using telepathic alien worms to appear as humans to the Doctor, Clara, and Rigsy.

Me, (Note: Listed in the credits as her original name, Ashildr.) the immortal mayor of the trap street, explains that she sentenced Rigsy to death after he was accused of murdering Anah, a two-face Janus. They gave him a Chronolock: a tattoo which counts down with each passing minute. When it reaches zero, a Quantum Shade (a being that takes the form of a raven) is summoned to kill him. However, they also had to give Rigsy an amnesia drug to forget the trap street's existence. Me allows the Doctor and Clara to prove Rigsy's innocence. Clara learns that the Chronolock can be transferred to another willingly. Believing Me will not let her die, Clara takes Rigsy's Chronolock without the Doctor's knowledge to buy them more time.

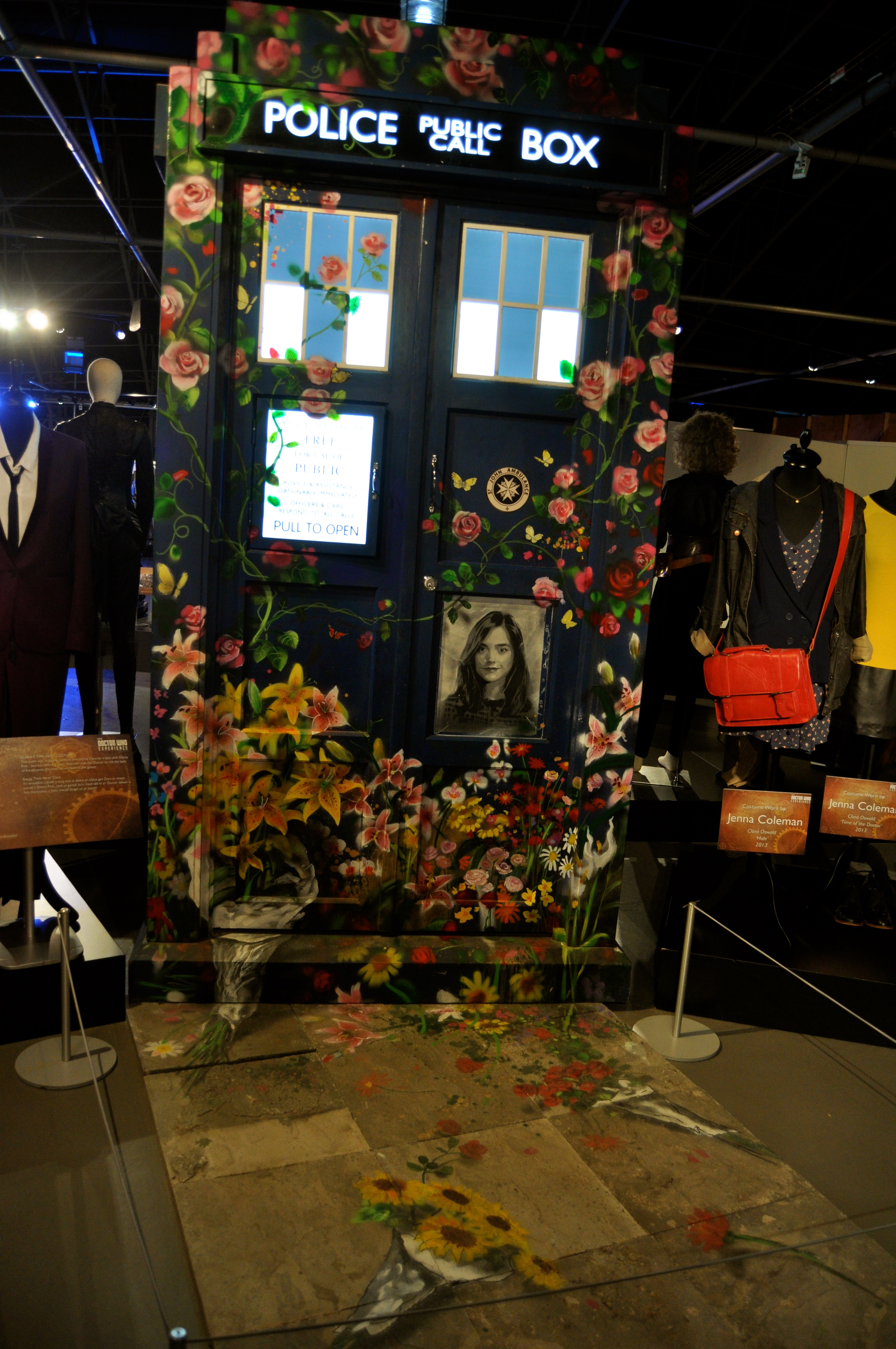
The painted TARDIS exterior, as shown at the Doctor Who Experience.

The trio meets Anah's psychic daughter, Anahson, and learns that Me used Rigsy to bring the Doctor to the trap street and that Me is afraid of someone Anahson cannot identify. The Doctor realises from the medical data in the stasis pod Anah is stored inside that Anah is still alive, and Anah is locked in by a device compatible with the TARDIS key. However, when the Doctor uses his key, the lock device clamps a metal ring around his wrist and takes the TARDIS key. The band is a teleportation device to send the Doctor far away to keep the street safe from attacks by unnamed people Me made a deal with. Me demands the Doctor's Confession Dial. Me then goes to remove the Chronolock from Rigsy only to discover Clara has taken it; Clara broke the contract Me had made with the Shade and she cannot undo it. The Doctor becomes angry and threatens Me, demanding that she save Clara, but Clara calms him down, asking him not to be upset or avenge her death. Clara says her goodbyes and then steps into the street to face the Shade before it kills her. Back in the house, the Doctor warns Me to keep away from him in future. Me then activates the band, sending the Doctor away.

=== Continuity ===
The Doctor once again consults his response cards, first seen in "Under the Lake", in "an effort to be nice" before breaking the news to Rigsy of his impending death.

Rigsy is injected with Retcon, a substance introduced in the Doctor Who spinoff, Torchwood, to cause those that take it to lose their memory of meeting members of Torchwood and having alien encounters.

Among the disguised aliens living on the trap street are a Sontaran, Judoon, an Ice Warrior and an Ood caring for a Cyberman.

Me asks the Doctor for his confession dial, first seen in "The Magician's Apprentice" and retrieved by the Doctor in "The Witch's Familiar".

Clara mentions her deceased lover Danny Pink, saying that if he could face death (as he did in "Death in Heaven"), then so can she.

As Clara entreats the Doctor not to take revenge on Ashildr, she tells him "don't be a warrior.... be a Doctor". This is the same plea she made to the Eleventh Doctor when he planned to destroy Gallifrey to end the Time War in "The Day of the Doctor".

=== Outside references ===
Clara mentions having a romantic relationship with writer Jane Austen. In "The Magician's Apprentice", she even calls her "a great kisser". Earlier in "The Caretaker", the Doctor disputes with Clara about when Austen wrote Pride and Prejudice.

As they prepare to investigate, Clara suggests that she and the Doctor employ the good cop/bad cop interrogation method, with her as the 'good' cop. When the Doctor asks why he can't play 'good cop', Clara says that his face won't allow him.

== Production ==
The read through for this episode was on 28 May 2015 and filming ran from 8 June to 25 June.

=== Cast notes ===
Joivan Wade originally appeared as Rigsy in "Flatline" in Series 8. Maisie Williams featured as Ashildr/Me in "The Girl Who Died" and "The Woman Who Lived". Robin Soans appeared as Luvic in The Keeper of Traken in Season 18. Simon Paisley Day made an appearance in "The End of the World" from Series 1.

== Reception ==
The episode was watched by 4.48 million viewers overnight in the UK, a 19.9% audience share. It received an Appreciation Index score of 84. The consolidated figures were 6.05 million viewers.

=== Critical reception ===
Professional ratings
Aggregate scores
Source	Rating
Rotten Tomatoes (Average Score)	8.7
Rotten Tomatoes (Tomatometer)	80%
Review scores
Source	Rating
The A.V. Club	A
Paste Magazine	8.5
SFX Magazine	5/5 stars
TV Fanatic	3/5 stars
IGN	8.4
New York Magazine	3/5 stars
The Daily Telegraph	4/5 stars
Radio Times	3/5 stars

On Rotten Tomatoes, 80% of 20 critics gave the episode a positive review, with an average rating of 8.7 out of 10. The website's consensus reads: "'Face the Raven' delivers the much anticipated departure of a beloved Doctor Who character in a farewell handled admirably by both Coleman and Capaldi."

In The Independent, Jon Cooper praised the episode, describing it as "A heady mixture of science fiction, Gothic whodunnit and emotional rollercoaster, it doesn't just leave you breathless – it leaves you wanting more." Conversely, Patrick Mulkern's review for Radio Times was more critical, stating that it was "at best, pedestrian. It's mostly dull and uninvolving."

== In print ==
Face the Raven
- Author: Nancy Taylor
- Series: Doctor Who novelisations
- Publisher: Pearson Education
- Publication date: 10 September 2019
- ISBN: 9781292206196

Pearson Education published a novelisation of this episode by Nancy Taylor for students of English language reading on 26 July 2018.
