= Heaven Sent (Doctor Who) =

261 – "Heaven Sent"
- Doctor Who episode
- The Twelfth Doctor (Peter Capaldi) discovers the wall of azbantium. Capaldi's performance was praised by critics.

Cast
- Doctor: Peter Capaldi – Twelfth Doctor
- Others: Jenna Coleman – Clara; Jami Reid-Quarrell – The Veil

Production
- Directed by: Rachel Talalay
- Written by: Steven Moffat
- Produced by: Peter Bennett
- Executive producers: Steven Moffat; Brian Minchin
- Music by: Murray Gold
- Series: Series 9
- Running time: 54 minutes
- First broadcast: 28 November 2015

Chronology
← Preceded by "Face the Raven"	Followed by → "Hell Bent"

"Heaven Sent" is the eleventh and penultimate episode of the ninth series of the British science fiction television series Doctor Who. It was first broadcast on BBC One on 28 November 2015. It was written by Steven Moffat and directed by Rachel Talalay.

In the episode, the alien time traveller the Twelfth Doctor (Peter Capaldi) is imprisoned in a waterlocked castle by his people, the Time Lords. A shrouded creature (Jami Reid-Quarrell) pursues the Doctor in an attempt to interrogate truths from him. The episode is a bottle episode that primarily features the Doctor without a companion or any guest speaking characters. It was watched by 6.19 million viewers in the United Kingdom.

"Heaven Sent" received universal acclaim, with praise for Capaldi's performance, Moffat's script, and Talalay's direction. Many labelled the episode the strongest of the ninth series and one of the strongest of the show overall. It was nominated for the Hugo Award for Best Dramatic Presentation (Short Form). The episode was voted the best Doctor Who story ever by readers of Doctor Who Magazine in 2023.

== Plot ==
The Twelfth Doctor is teleported into a glass chamber within an empty castle in the sea. He is pursued by a cloaked veiled figure, (Note: The figure is not identified in the episode but called "Veil" in the credits.) which evokes the Doctor's childhood fears. When the figure corners the Doctor, he admits he is afraid to die. The figure halts and the castle reconfigures itself. The Doctor jumps out of a window into the sea, finding many skulls under the water. The Doctor concludes that the castle is a torture chamber. He takes advantage of the figure's slow reaction time to explore the castle, finding several strange remnants of his predecessors, such as dry replacement clothes, a skull connected to the transportation chamber, and the word "bird" written in dust. The Doctor investigates clues left in the castle, directing him to find Room 12. He delays the figure by alleging knowledge of "the Hybrid"; the movement of the reconfiguring castle causes the skull to fall into the sea.

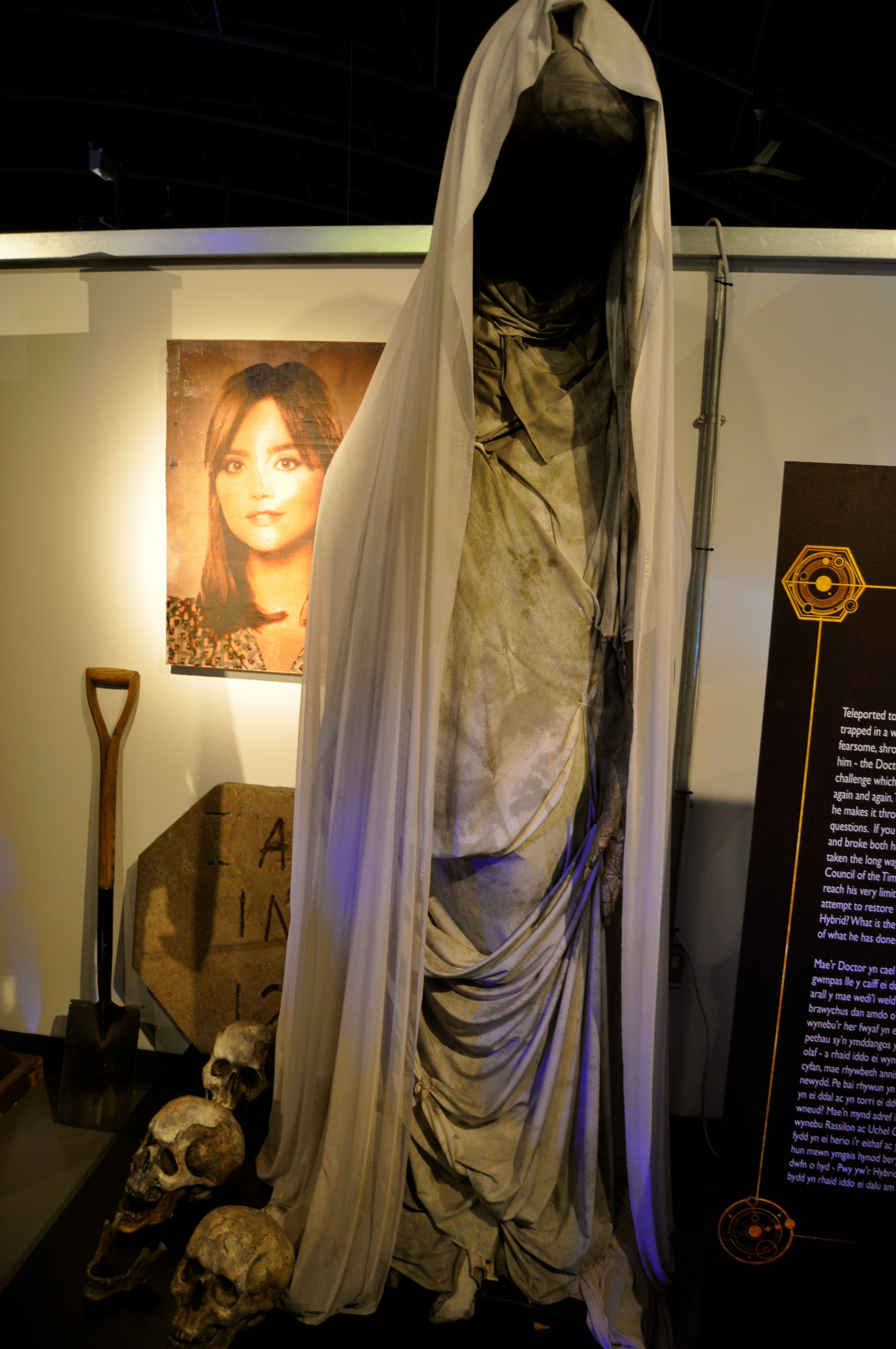
The shrouded figure, referred to as the "Veil" in the credits, as shown at the Doctor Who Experience.

Inside Room 12, the Doctor discovers a wall of azbantium; a mineral harder than diamond, behind which he theorises the TARDIS to be. He realises that "bird" refers to "The Shepherd Boy", a fairytale by the Brothers Grimm in which a shepherd's boy says to an Emperor that a second of eternity will have passed when a bird chisels a diamond mountain down to nothing with its beak. The Doctor temporarily despairs following an epiphany: the prison was made solely for him, and thus the skulls were his own and he has been in the castle for 7000 years. Revitalised by a vision of his dead companion, Clara, the Doctor punches the wall while reciting the fable. The figure mortally injures the Doctor, disabling his regeneration. He crawls back to the teleportation chamber, and burns his body as a catalyst to restart the teleport, aware that due to the resetting rooms, a "blueprint" of himself is inside. He then falls to the ground, writes "bird" in the dust, and disintegrates, reduced to the skull which the Doctor had seen earlier. A new Doctor appears, starting the cycle anew.

After many more cycles, (Note: Described as lasting four and a half billion years in the following week's episode "Hell Bent".) the Doctor finally breaks through the wall. He finds himself outside the Capitol on Gallifrey; the castle was in his confession dial. (Note: Referred to in the 2015 episodes "The Magician's Apprentice" and "Face the Raven" as the Doctor's "last will and testament".) The Doctor tells a young boy to tell the Time Lords that he is on his way and that he knows what they did. He then proclaims the Hybrid prophesied by the Time Lords is "Me". (Note: "Hell Bent" clarifies that the Doctor's declaration expresses his belief that the Hybrid is Ashildr, who became a human-Mire hybrid in "The Girl Who Died" and later adopted the name Me.)

=== Continuity ===
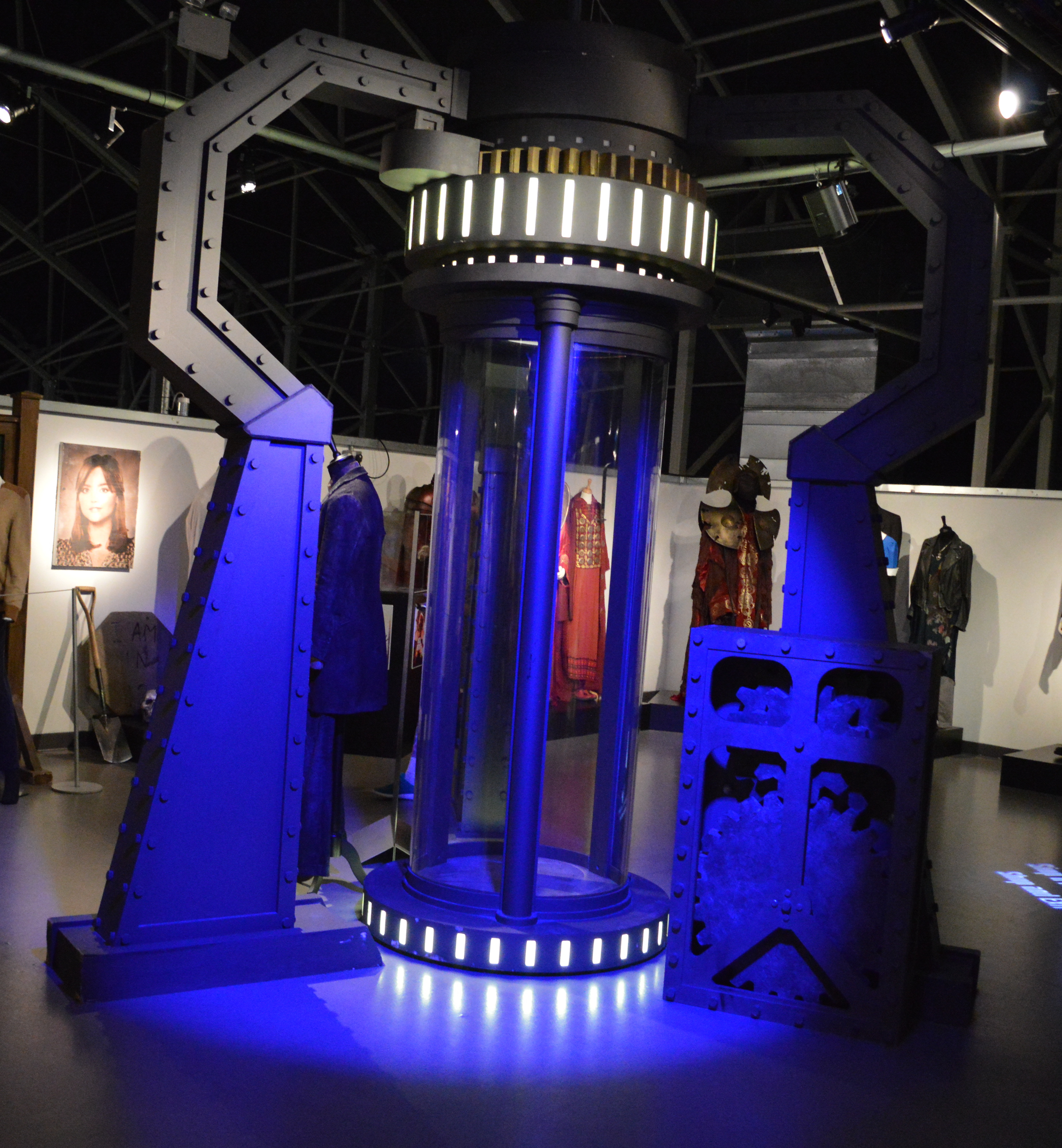
The teleporter set, on display at the Doctor Who Experience.

As he walks down the corridor, the Doctor says to his unseen adversary "the Doctor will see you now". The Eleventh Doctor shouts this same line to the Atraxi in "The Eleventh Hour" (2010).

The Doctor tells himself "Assume you're going to survive. Always assume that." This is what Clara says of the Doctor in "The Witch's Familiar": "he always assumes he's going to win. He always knows there's a way to survive".

The Doctor confesses that he ran from Gallifrey because he was scared, and that the pretense of being bored was a lie. Originally, in The War Games (1969), the Second Doctor admitted to his companions that "Well, I was bored".

Once he arrives on Gallifrey, the Doctor tells the young boy to announce that he "came the long way around", finally finishing the objective set by the Eleventh Doctor in "The Day of the Doctor" (2013) saying that he was going "home, the long way around".

== Production ==
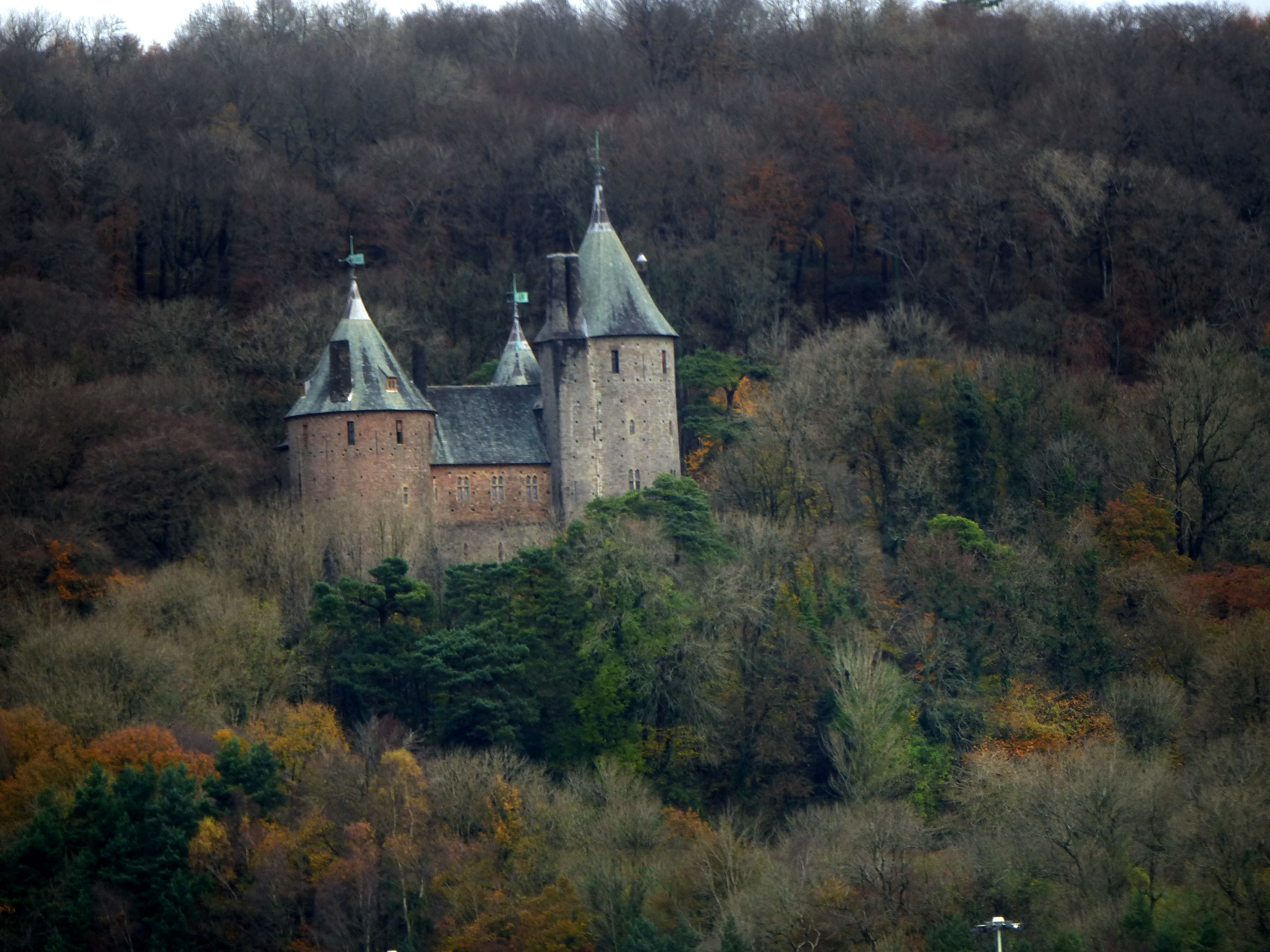
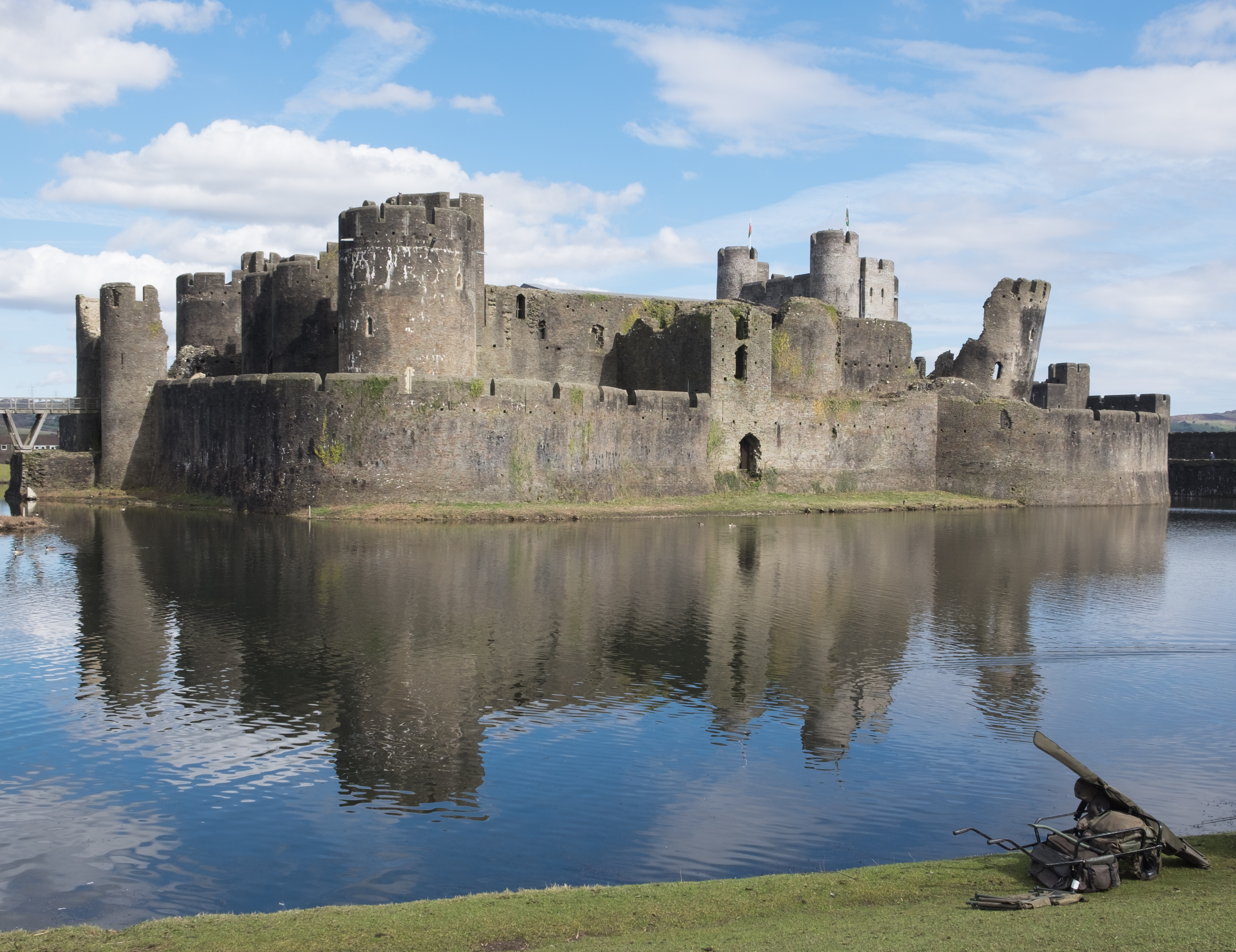
Castell Coch and Caerphilly Castle were used as filming locations for the waterlocked castle.

This episode primarily features the Doctor, with the non-speaking Veil portrayed by movement artist Jami Reid-Quarrell (who also appeared as Colony Sarff in "The Magician's Apprentice" / "The Witch's Familiar" earlier in the series). Steven Moffat had originally planned for the creature to be a Weeping Angel. Former companion Clara and an uncredited Gallifreyan child also make brief appearances.

Before series 8 began, Moffat promised a cliffhanger for series 9, and teased in Doctor Who Magazine Issue 475, "I've figured out the cliffhanger to the penultimate episode of series 9. And it's a whopper. Ohh, I don't think you'll see this coming!"

The read through took place on 18 June 2015 and filming began on 24 June 2015. Filming for the castle interior scenes took place in Cardiff Castle and Caerphilly Castle, in addition to constructed sets in the Roath Lock Studios.

== Reception ==
The episode was watched by 4.51 million viewers in the UK overnight, a 20.7% audience share; the consolidated figures were 6.19 million viewers with a 24.9% share. It received an Appreciation Index score of 80.

=== Critical reception ===
Professional ratings
Aggregate scores
Source	Rating
Rotten Tomatoes (Average Score)	9.81
Rotten Tomatoes (Tomatometer)	89%
Review scores
Source	Rating
The A.V. Club	A
IndieWire	A+
IGN	9.5
Paste Magazine	10.0
PopMatters	9/10
Radio Times	5/5 stars
SFX Magazine	5/5 stars
TV Fanatic	5/5 stars
Vulture	5/5 stars

"Heaven Sent" received critical acclaim, with the majority of critics declaring it the greatest episode of the ninth series, and possibly one of the greatest episodes in the show's run. Many instances of extremely high praise were aimed towards Steven Moffat's script, Rachel Talalay's direction, and Peter Capaldi's performance. The episode has a score of 89% on Rotten Tomatoes, with an average score of 9.8, the highest average score of the series on the website. The site's consensus reads "Peter Capaldi turns in a one-man command performance in this episode's exploration of grief, and a surprise turn of events sets up an explosive season finale".

Patrick Mulkern of Radio Times awarded the episode a perfect five star rating, saying that "Peter Capaldi's one-man show is an instant classic" and a "tour de force" for his magnificent performance. He also said that the episode's structure "works perfectly without ever seeming contrived" with Moffat's "trademark intricacy", and that Talalay "steeps the production in atmosphere and sustains the momentum right until the final revelations".

Calling the episode a "mind-bending masterpiece", Morgan Jeffery of Digital Spy stated that it was also "one of the most surreal episodes to date" with Moffat "cleverly subverting the expectations of a low-budget escapade, with a surplus of Capaldi awkwardly expressing his inner thoughts aloud." He said that the episode was "as far from big, broad, family-friendly entertainment as you can get", and that and "its rejection of the standard Doctor Who trappings might be too much for some"; but if viewers embrace the weirdness, then you'll end up captivated, calling it "demanding and intelligent science-fiction, the likes of which BBC One should be commended for airing".

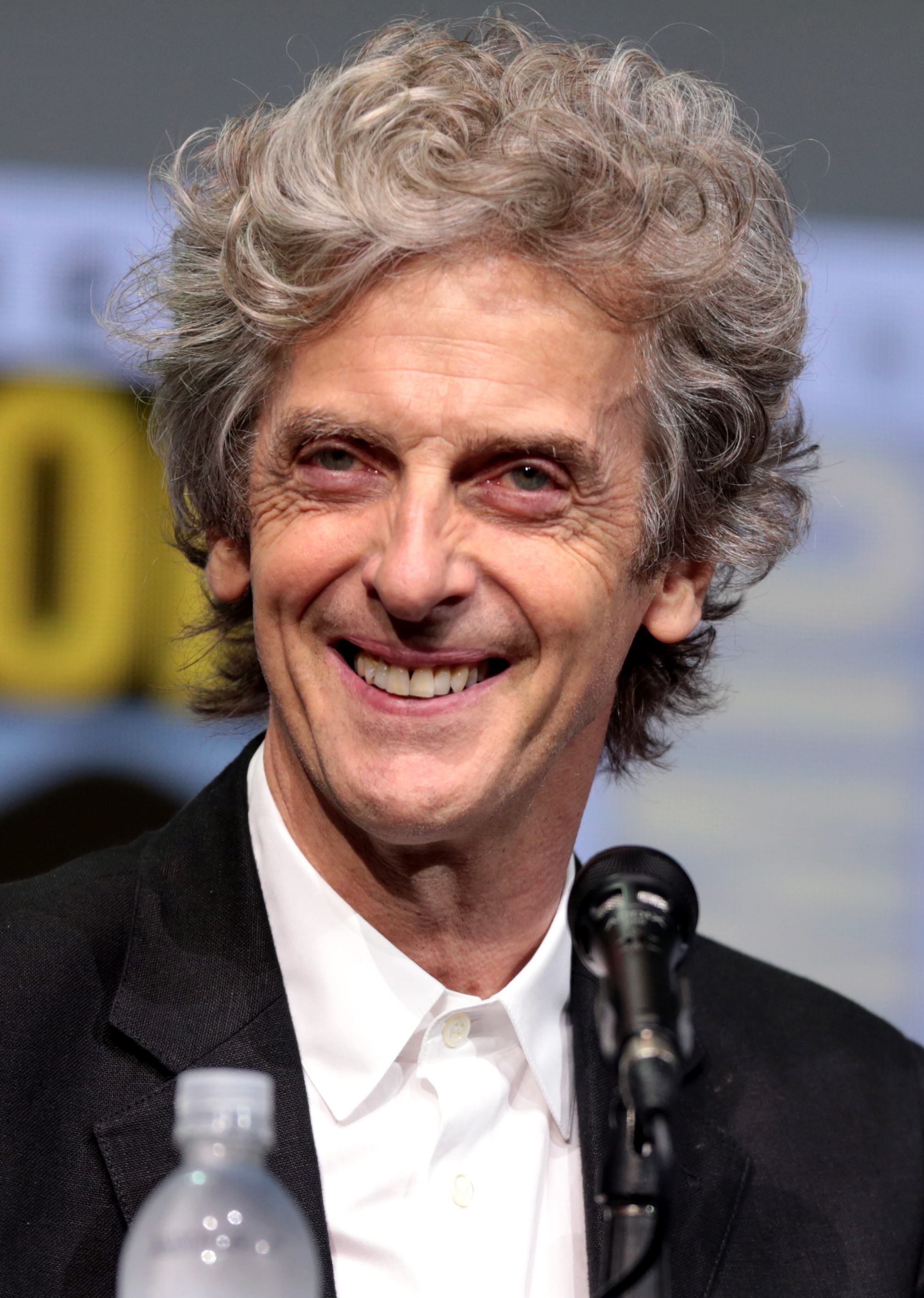
Peter Capaldi received widespread critical acclaim for his performance in the episode.

Alasdair Wilkins of The A.V. Club gave the episode an 'A', for the fifth time this season, writing "This season has been a remarkable achievement for the show, and, pending next week's finale, it's got a real chance to go down as the best season of the revival, topping even Matt Smith's debut in season five. And hey, maybe "Hell Bent" will be the perfect capper to this season, or maybe it won't. But the genius of the construction of this season's endgame is that "Hell Bent" could be an unmitigated disaster and it still wouldn't really undo the genius of "Heaven Sent" or "Face The Raven" before it."

Awarding the episode a score of 9.5 and deeming it "amazing" and the highest of the series, Scott Collura of IGN particularly praised the episode's conclusion by stating that "the realization that the sea of skulls is actually a sea of Doctor skulls" is a thrilling, brilliant twist, played beautifully with a "gentle guitar-driven score. He further praised Capaldi's performance, calling it "a breathtaking one-man show". Referring to it as "an epic one man show", Tim Liew of Metro also acclaimed the episode, saying that he "loved it". He particularly praised Steven Moffat and Peter Capaldi, stating that Moffat "takes a bold step by stripping his story back to its bare bones" and Capaldi "delivers 100%, carrying every scene"; he also praised the "superb new musical score" from series composer Murray Gold.

Mark Rozeman of Paste Magazine also awarded the episode a perfect score (10.0), labeling it "a masterpiece of the highest order", whilst Ian Berriman of SFX Magazine also awarded full marks, saying "Heaven Sent stands as the best episode of the season so far: madly surreal, ingeniously baffling, immensely creepy and downright gruelling in its latter stages, with a tremendously impactful payoff".

=== Accolades ===
In 2016 "Heaven Sent" received a nomination for Hugo Award for Best Dramatic Presentation (Short Form). "Heaven Sent" is also the first episode of Doctor Who to be submitted for nomination for a Primetime Emmy Award, due to BBC America being one of the series' co-producers. The episode was submitted to support Capaldi for Outstanding Lead Actor in a Drama Series, Moffat for Outstanding Writing for a Drama Series, and Talalay for Outstanding Directing for a Drama Series, in addition to several other Creative Arts Emmys.

In 2023, a Doctor Who Magazine fan poll voted Heaven Sent as the best Doctor Who story of all time. The Daily Telegraph ranked the episode the 16th best of the entire programme in 2023.

== Soundtrack ==
Selected pieces of score from this episode, as composed by Murray Gold, comprise the entire third disc of the ninth series' 4-CD soundtrack, which was released on 27 April 2018 by Silva Screen Records.

== See also ==
- Teletransportation Paradox
