= Rachel Talalay =

American screen director and producer (born 1958)

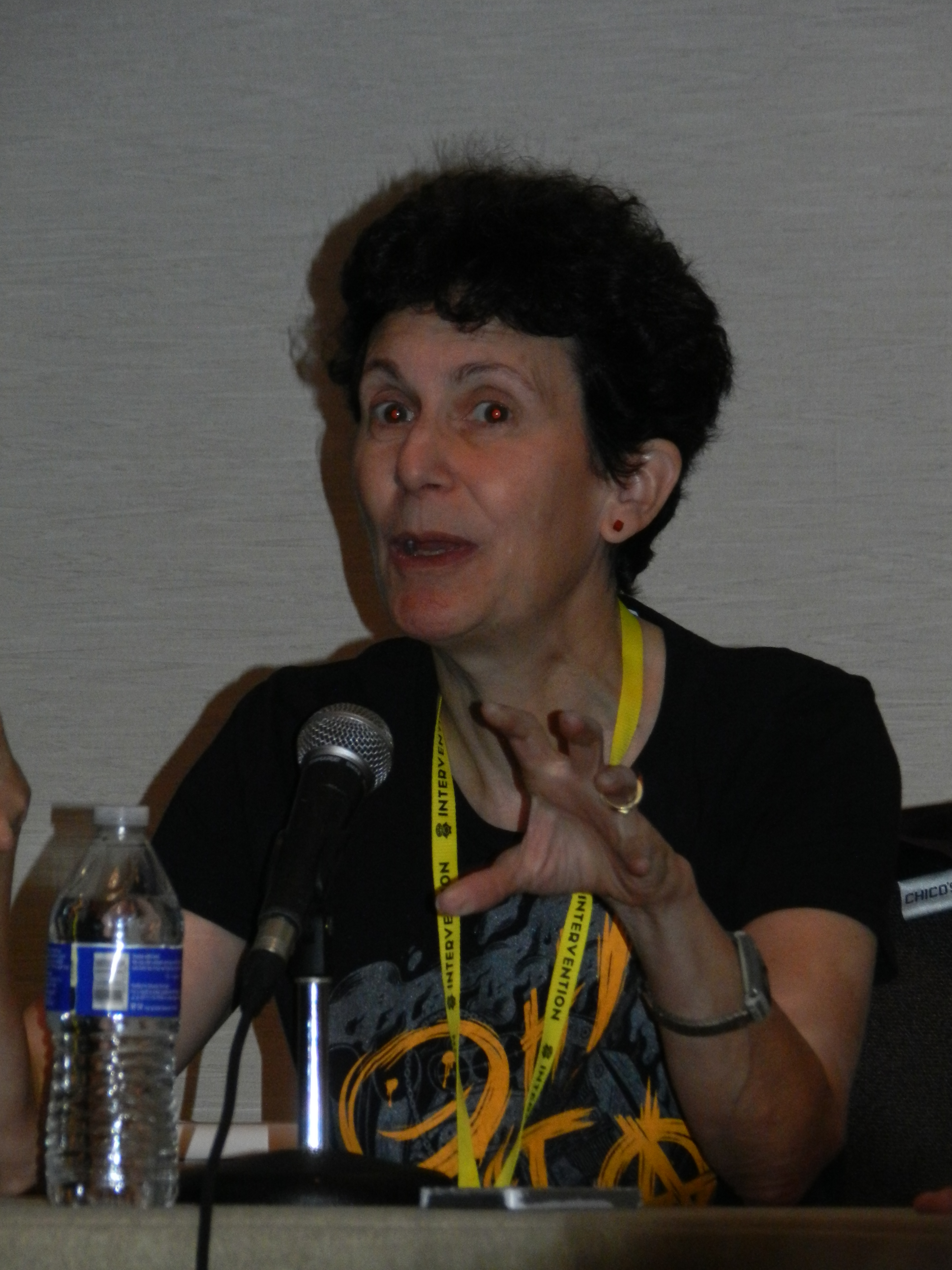
- Talalay in 2016
- Born: Chicago, Illinois, United States
- Education: Yale University
- Occupations: Producer; writer; director; professor
- Years active: 1981–present
- Spouse: Rupert Harvey (m. 1990; died 2026)
- Children: 2
- Parent: Paul Talalay (father)

Rachel Talalay (/ˈtæləleɪ/ TAL-ə-lay) is an American producer, writer, and director. She is best known for directing films such as Freddy's Dead: The Final Nightmare (1991), Ghost in the Machine (1993), and Tank Girl (1995). Her television credits include episodes of Ally McBeal, Supernatural, Doctor Who, Sherlock, Riverdale, Doom Patrol, Superman & Lois, and Quantum Leap. Talalay taught as a professor at the University of British Columbia until 2020.

== Early life and education ==
Talalay was born in Chicago. Her father Paul Talalay was a pharmacologist, born in Berlin to a Belarusian Jewish family, and her mother Pamela is an English biochemist. She has two sisters and a brother. She was raised mostly in Baltimore, with two years of her childhood in Britain. Talalay attended Yale University, where she majored in mathematics, graduating in 1980. She also ran the Yale Film Society.

== Career ==
Talalay worked in a number of different capacities in filmmaking, including on the first four A Nightmare on Elm Street films, before making her directorial debut with Freddy's Dead: The Final Nightmare (1991). Her work with the earlier Nightmare films utilized her computer skills and finding ways to create better special effects while still keeping costs low. Despite her familiarity with the Freddy movies, when she directed Freddy's Dead, she was given internal memos telling her not to be "too girly" or "too sensitive."

Talalay also directed Tank Girl in 1995, and was looking into re-optioning the rights to make a new film in 2008. As a film producer, Talalay worked with director John Waters on the films Hairspray (1988) and Cry-Baby (1990). She was also a production assistant on Waters' 1981 film Polyester.

Talalay stated that she wanted to work on Doctor Who ever since it was revived in 2005. She directed all three of Peter Capaldi's series finales: series 8's "Dark Water" and "Death in Heaven", series 9's "Heaven Sent" and "Hell Bent"—the former considered by many to be one of the best episodes in the show's history—and series 10's "World Enough and Time" and "The Doctor Falls", as well as the Doctor Who 2017 Christmas special, "Twice Upon a Time". She returned to Doctor Who in 2023 for "The Star Beast", with David Tennant and Catherine Tate returning as the Fourteenth Doctor and Donna Noble as part of the show's 60th anniversary. In 2019, she directed a film adaptation of Joe Ballarini's A Babysitter's Guide to Monster Hunting for Netflix.

== Personal life ==
Talalay met British film producer Rupert Harvey while working on Android in 1982. They began a relationship soon after, and were married in 1990, with John Waters officiating the wedding. Talalay and Harvey have a daughter named Lucy.

On 13 May 2026, Talalay announced she had lost her husband two weeks before.

== Filmography ==
=== Films ===
Director

- Freddy's Dead: The Final Nightmare (1991) (also story writer)
- Ghost in the Machine (1993)
- Tank Girl (1995)
- A Babysitter's Guide to Monster Hunting (2020)

Producer

- Hairspray (1988)
- A Nightmare on Elm Street 4: The Dream Master (1988)
- Cry-Baby (1990)
- The Borrowers (1997)

=== Television ===
TV movies

- A Tale of Two Wives (2003)
- The Wind in the Willows (2006)
- Hannah's Law (2012)
- The Dorm (2014)
- Unclaimed (2016)

TV series

Year	Title	Episodes	Ref
1997	Band of Gold	"Tainted Love (Part 1)"; "Tainted Love (Part 2)"	
1998	To Have & to Hold	"Turkey Day Blues"; "Who's Sorry Next?"	
1998	Touching Evil (U.K. Series)	"War Relief: Part 1"; "War Relief: Part 2"	
1999–2002	Ally McBeal	"Saving Santa"; "Prime Suspect"; "Two's a Crowd"; "Blowin' in the Wind"	
2000	Boston Public	"Chapter Five"	
2000	Randall & Hopkirk (Deceased)	"Mental Apparition Disorder"; "A Blast From the Past"	
2001	That's Life	"Miracle at the Cucina"	
2001	State of Grace	"Eve of Discussion"	
2001	Wolf Lake	"Tastes Like Chicken"	
2001	Dice	"Episode #1.1"; "Episode #1.2"; "Episode #1.3"; "Episode #1.4"; "Episode #1.5"; "Episode #1.6"	
2002	Without a Trace	"He Saw, She Saw"	
2002	Crossing Jordan	"Four Fathers"	
2002–2007	The Dead Zone	"Shaman"; "Symmetry"; "Ego"	
2002–2003	The Division	"A Priori"; "Castaways"	
2003	Cold Case	"Sherry Darlin"	
2004	Touching Evil (U.S. Series)	"Y Me"	
2004	Life as We Know It	"Natural Disasters"	
2004	Unfabulous	"The Perfect Couple"	
2005	Sex, Love & Secrets	"Protection" (Unaired)	
2005	Terminal City	"Episode #1.1"; "Episode #1.2"; "Episode #1.7"; "Episode #1.8"	
2006	Whistler	"In The Air"; "After The Fall"; "Scratching The Surface"; "Meltdown"	
2007	Supernatural	"Hunted"	
2007	Greek	"Separation Anxiety"	
2007	Kyle XY	"Hands on a Hybrid"; "Leap of Faith"	
2008	Flash Gordon	"Blame"	
2009	Da Kink in My Hair	"Of Papers and Patois"; "Playing Social"; "Honesty the Best Policy?"	
2009	Durham County	"Boys Do Things"; "Consumed"	
2010	Cra$h & Burn	"Lawyers, Guns & Money"; "Bond Blame Baptize"	
2010	Bloodletting & Miraculous Cures	"How to Get Ahead in Medical School"; "Family Practice"; "Unhappy Endings"	
2010	Haven	"Harmony"; "Surviving the Fall"	
2011	Endgame	"Gorillas in Our Midst"	
2011	Hiccups	"Sexual Healing"	
2012	Continuum	"Time's Up"	
2012	XIII: The Series	"Breakout"; "Mousetrap"	
2013	Bomb Girls	"Party Line"; "Fifth Column"	
2013	Played	"Cars"; "Revenge"	
2014	Reign	"Sacrifice"	
2014–2015, 2017, 2022–2023	Doctor Who	"Deep Breath" (2014) (uncredited, 1 scene); "Into the Dalek" (2014) (uncredited, 1 scene); "Dark Water" (2014); "Death in Heaven" (2014); "Heaven Sent" (2015); "Hell Bent" (2015); "World Enough and Time" (2017); "The Doctor Falls" (2017); "Twice Upon a Time" (2017); "The Power of the Doctor" (2022) (uncredited, 1 scene); "The Star Beast" (2023)	
2015	South of Hell	"Judge and Fury"; "White Noise"	
2016–2023	The Flash	"Fast Lane"; "The Present"; "Fury Rogue"; "Cause and XS"; "Masquerade"; "The Mask of the Red Death, Part 2"	
2016–2021	Legends of Tomorrow	"Last Refuge"; "Meat the Legends"	
2016–2019	Supergirl	"Welcome to Earth"; "Suspicious Minds"	
2017	Sherlock	"The Six Thatchers"	
2018–2021	Riverdale	"Chapter Twenty-Five: The Wicked and the Divine"; "Chapter Forty-One: Manhunter"; "Chapter Fifty-Seven: Survive the Night"; "Chapter Eighty-Four: Lock & Key"	
2018	Iron Fist	"The City's Not for Burning"	
2018	Chilling Adventures of Sabrina	"Chapter Six: An Exorcism in Greendale"	
2019	Doom Patrol	"Puppet Patrol"	
2019	American Gods	"Donar the Great"	
2021	Superman & Lois	"The Best of Smallville"	
2022	Quantum Leap	"A Decent Proposal"	
2026	Good Omens	"The Finale"	

== Accolades ==
=== Leo Awards ===
- Best Direction Dramatic Series - Winner - Terminal City - For Episode 8
