= Paul Talalay =

American cancer researcher and pharmacologist

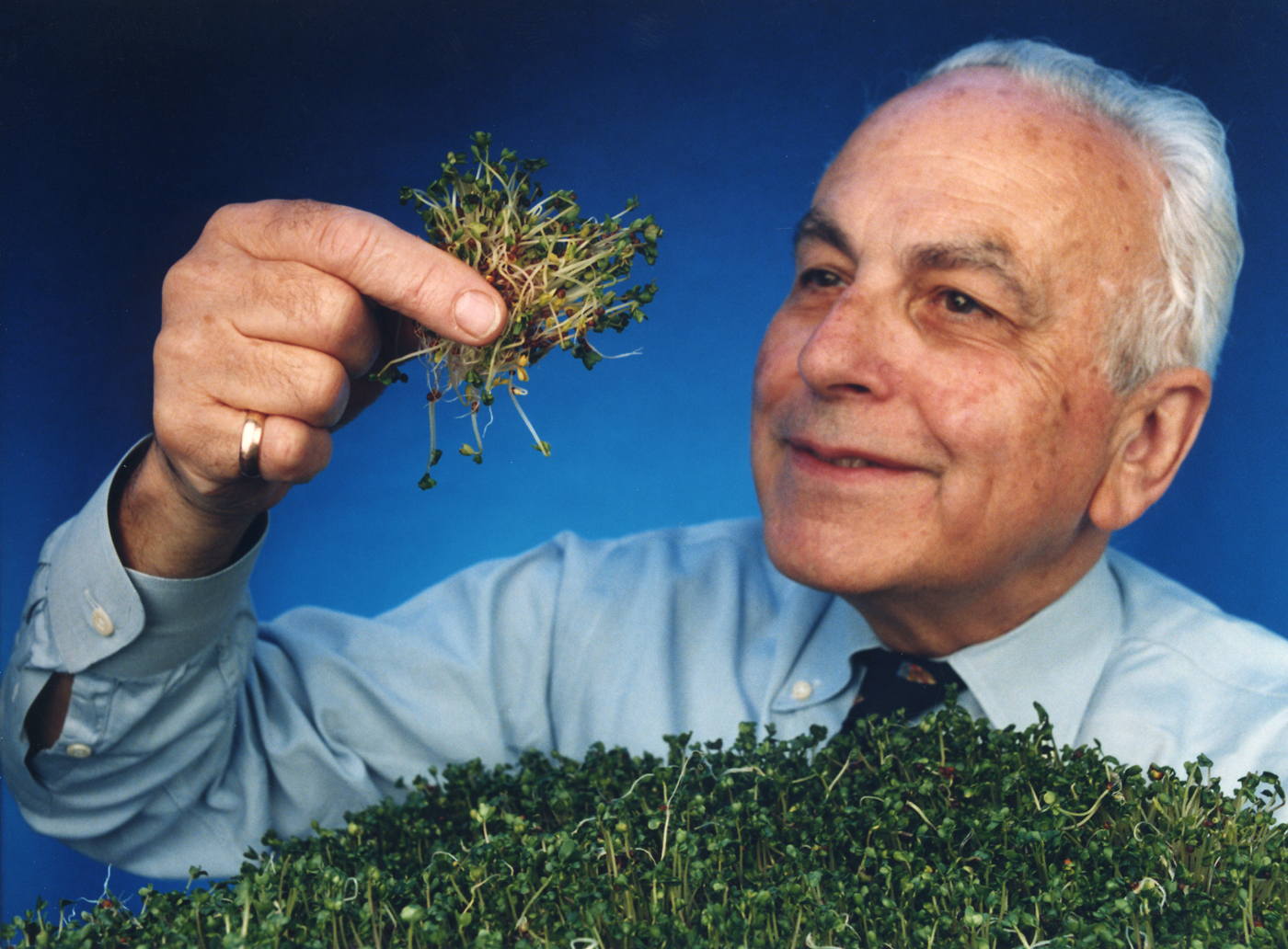

Paul Talalay (31 March 1923 – 10 March 2019) was a John Jacob Abel Distinguished Service Professor of Pharmacology and director of the Laboratory for Molecular Sciences at the Johns Hopkins School of Medicine in Baltimore. He was the founder of the Brassica Chemoprotection Laboratory for the study of edible plants that induce protective enzyme activity in the body and may help prevent the development of cancer.

== Biography ==
Paul Talalay was born to Belarusian Jewish parents in Berlin, Germany, but immigrated to England with his family in 1933, shortly after the Nazi Party came to power. His father Joseph was an engineer and inventor, and his mother Sophie was a homemaker. He was educated at Bedford School and, in 1940, he travelled to the United States to enter the Massachusetts Institute of Technology, where he majored in biology. In 1944, Talalay entered medical school at the University of Chicago and, in 1946, he transferred to Yale School of Medicine. He received his M.D. in 1948. In 1950, he received a Damon Runyon Cancer Research Fellowship and returned to the University of Chicago to begin research on steroid hormones. Between 1962 and 1974, Talalay was director of the Department of Pharmacology and Experimental Therapeutics at the Johns Hopkins School of Medicine. In 1974 he was appointed as John Jacob Abel Distinguished Service Professor of Pharmacology.

Talalay's career was devoted to cancer research and the achievement of early protection against cell damage. A pioneer in the field of chemoprotective research strategies, Talalay and his colleagues devised simple cell culture methods for detecting phytochemicals which appear to boost enzymes that detoxify carcinogens in the body. This work led to the isolation of sulforaphane, found in broccoli, as a potent inducer of detoxifying phase two enzymes. These findings, published in 1992, attracted worldwide attention as a major breakthrough in understanding the link between cruciferous vegetable consumption and reduced cancer risk.

Talalay was awarded one of the first lifetime professorships of the American Cancer Society. He is a member of the National Academy of Sciences, the American Philosophical Society, and the American Academy of Arts and Sciences. The M.D. – Ph.D. Student Library at Johns Hopkins University is named in Talalay's honour.

Filmmaker Rachel Talalay is his daughter.
