= Clare Higgins =

British actress (born 1955)

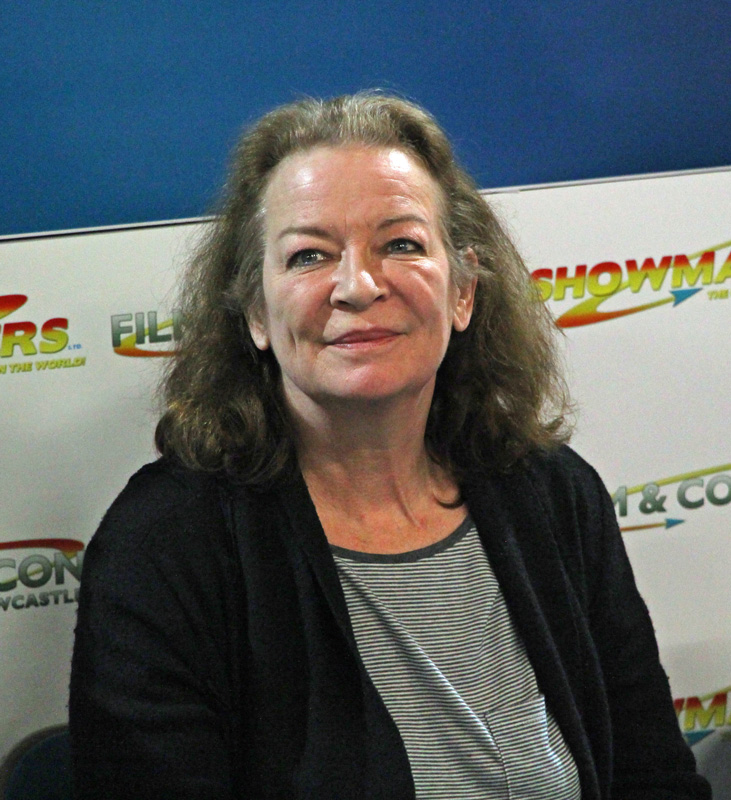
- Higgins in 2016
- Born: Clare Frances Elizabeth Higgins; 10 November 1955 (age 70); Bradford, West Riding of Yorkshire, England
- Education: London Academy of Music and Dramatic Art
- Occupation: Actress
- Years active: 1980–present

Clare Frances Elizabeth Higgins (born 10 November 1955) is an English actress. She is a three-time winner of the Olivier Award for Best Actress; for Sweet Bird of Youth (1995), Vincent in Brixton (2003), and Hecuba (2005). She made her Broadway debut in 2003 in Vincent in Brixton, receiving a Tony Award nomination for Best Actress in a Play.

Higgins is known to film audiences for her role as Julia Cotton in the horror film Hellraiser (1987) and its first sequel, Hellbound: Hellraiser II (1988). She also starred as Miss Cackle on the CBBC fantasy television series The Worst Witch (2017-2020), based on the children's book series of the name.

== Early life ==
Higgins, the first of six children, was born in Bradford, to Paula Cecilia (née Murphy) and James Stephen Higgins. Her parents were from working class Irish Catholic backgrounds, and worked as teachers. Higgins was interested in acting from her childhood. After being expelled from a convent school, she ran away from home at seventeen. At 19, she gave birth to a boy, but gave him up for adoption at her social worker's insistence.

Higgins is cousin to British American writer Nicola Griffith.

== Career ==
=== Theatre ===
At 23, Higgins graduated from the London Academy of Music and Dramatic Art (LAMDA). Through the 1980s, she became a dynamic stage actress, both in London and on Broadway. She starred in the premiere of David Hare's The Secret Rapture, and won the first of her three Olivier Awards in 1995. In 1983, she starred with Ben Cross in the BBC's serial version of A.J. Cronin's The Citadel, playing the role of Christine Manson.

Higgins appeared as Jocasta in the National Theatre's critically acclaimed production of Oedipus, opposite Ralph Fiennes in the title role. From April to May 2009, she appeared in Wallace Shawn's The Fever at the Royal Court Theatre.

From mid-May to September 2009, she appeared as the Countess Rossillion in All's Well That Ends Well at the National Theatre (Olivier stage).

=== Film ===
For the big screen, Higgins played Julia Cotton in Clive Barker's Hellraiser (1987), based on Barker's novella The Hellbound Heart. She reprised the role for Tony Randel's Hellbound: Hellraiser II (1988). She was originally intended to play a major role in the third film, but requested her character be killed off at the end of the second film.

Her other film credits include the Scottish film Small Faces (1996). In 2000, she appeared in Catherine Cookson's The Secret mini-series as Maggie Hewitt, as well as in Woody Allen's Cassandra's Dream (2007) and The Golden Compass (2007).

=== Television ===
In 1996, Higgins appeared in an episode (series 6, episode 14) of Heartbeat as Maureen Bristow, an escaped prisoner.

On 30 September 2012, she appeared in season 3, episode 3 of Downton Abbey as Mrs Bartlett, a friend of Mrs Bates who eventually helps in the release of Mr Bates from prison.

On 14 November 2013, she appeared in the Doctor Who mini-episode "The Night of the Doctor", which starred Paul McGann as the Eighth Doctor. Higgins played Ohila, the leader of the Sisterhood of Karn. In 2014, she appeared in the Father Brown episode "The Daughters of Jerusalem" as Dinah Fortescue. Higgins returned to the role of Ohila in 2015 in "The Magician's Apprentice", which originally aired on 19 September 2015, and in the series finale "Hell Bent" on 5 December 2015. The same year, she appeared in EastEnders, as prosecuting lawyer Hazel Warren.

In January 2017, Higgins starred in CBBC's adaptation of Jill Murphy's The Worst Witch as Miss Ada Cackle, and her wicked twin sister Agatha.

== Filmography ==
=== Film ===
Year	Title	Role	Notes
1985	Nineteen Nineteen	Young Sophie	
1987	Hellraiser	Julia Cotton	
1988	The Fruit Machine	Eve	
1988	Hellbound: Hellraiser II	Julia Cotton	
1993	Bad Behaviour	Jessica Kennedy	
1994	Thin Ice	Fiona	
1996	Small Faces	Lorna Maclean	
1998	B. Monkey	Ms. Cherry	
2000	The House of Mirth	Mrs. Bry	
2004	Stage Beauty	Mistress Revels	
2004	The Libertine	Molly Luscombe	
2005	Bigger Than the Sky	Edwina Walters	
2005	Mrs. Palfrey at the Claremont	Mrs. Meyer	
2007	Cassandra's Dream	Dorothy Blaine	
2007	Spring 1941	Clara Planck	
2007	The Stronger	Mrs. X	Short film
2007	The Golden Compass	Ma Costa	
2009	National Theatre Live: All's Well That Ends Well	Countess of Rousillon	Season 1
2010	National Theatre Live: Hamlet	Gertrude	Season 2
2012	A Fantastic Fear of Everything	Clair De Grunwald	
2013	I Give It a Year	Elaine	
2016	The Complete Walk: Richard III	Margaret	Short film
2018	Ready Player One	Mrs. Gilmore	
2018	The Convent	Reverend Mother	

=== Television ===
Year	Title	Role	Notes
1980	Pride and Prejudice	Miss Kitty Bennet	Mini-series; 5 episodes
1981	BBC2 Playhouse	Annie MacFarlane	Episode: "Unity"
1981	Plays for Pleasure	Ann	Episode: "The Concubine"
1981	Byron: A Personal Tour	Lady Caroline Lamb	Television film
1983	The Citadel	Christine Barlow/Manson	Mini-series; 9 episodes
1984	Mitch	Jo	6 episodes
1985	Cover Her Face	Catherine Bowers	Mini-series; 5 episodes
1986	Hideaway	Ann Wright	Mini-series; 6 episodes
1987	Up Line	Fizzy Targett	Mini-series; 3 episodes
1988	Dreams, Secrets, Beautiful Lies	Pamela	Television film
1989	After the War	Rachel Jordan/Lucas	Mini-series; 7 episodes
1992	Boon	Christine Pryall	Episode: "Deadline"
1992	Downtown Lagos	Ms. McDonald	Mini-series; 2 episodes
1993	The Inspector Alleyn Mysteries	Marjorie Wilde	Episode: "A Man Lay Dead"
1993	Circle of Deceit: The Wolves are Howling	Eilish	Television film (pilot for series Circles of Deceit)
1994	Screen Two	Fiona	Episode: "Men of the Month"
1994	Fatherland	Klara	Television film
1995	Screen Two	Lindsay Fontaine	Episode: "The Absence of War"
1996	Kavanagh QC	Susannah Dixon QC	Episode: "Men of Substance"
1996	Heartbeat	Maureen Bristow	Episode: "The Best Laid Plans"
1996	Silent Witness	DS Farmer	8 episodes
1999	The Adventures of Young Indiana Jones	Edith Wharton	Episode: "Tales of Innocence"
2000	The Secret	Maggie Hewitt	Mini-series; 3 episodes
2000	The Bill	Judy Ryan	Episode: "Take It or Leave It"
2003	Vincent in Brixton	Ursula Loyer	Television film
2005	M.I.T.: Murder Investigation Team	Lesley Pattison	Episode: #2.1
2005	Midsomer Murders	Laura Crawford	Episode: "Midsomer Rhapsody"
2005	Casanova	Cook	Mini-series; 2 episodes
2005	Murder in Suburbia	Helen White	Episode: "Witches"
2006	Goldplated	Yvonne	Episode: "Cassidy's Mother"
2007	Midsomer Murders	Gina Colby	Episode: "Death in a Chocolate Box"
2008	The Curse of Steptoe	Joan Littlewood	Television film
2008	Midsomer Murders	'Medea' read by her (voice)	Episode: "Talking to the Dead"
2009	Minder	Liz Grant	Episode: "A Matter of Life and Debt"
2009	Being Human	Josie	2 episodes
2009	Casualty 1909	Mrs. Ramsbury	Episode: #1.4
2010	Toast	Mavis	Television film
2011	Casualty	Brenda Tunnell	Episode: "Charlie's Angels"
2012	The Syndicate	Joyce	5 episodes
2012	Parade's End	Lady Claudine	Mini-series; 4 episodes
2012	Shameless	Hazel	Episode: "The Brazilian Effect"
2012	Downton Abbey	Mrs. Bartlett	2 episodes
2012	Homefront	Paula Raveley	6 episodes
2013	Holby City	Susannah Harris	4 episodes
2014	Father Brown	Dinah Fortescue	Episode: "The Daughters of Jerusalem"
2014	Rogue	Vivian	10 episodes
2014	New Tricks	Francis Kane	Episode: "Deep Swimming"
2015	EastEnders	Hazel Warren	9 episodes
2015	Doctor Who	Ohila	Episodes: "The Magician's Apprentice", "Hell Bent"
2017	Liar	Felicity Cassidy	Episode: "Catherine"
2017	Love, Lies and Records	Jean	2 episodes
2017–2020	The Worst Witch	Miss Cackle / Agatha	52 episodes (4 series)
2018	The Bisexual	Grace	Episode: #1.4
2018–2019	Into the Badlands	Ankara	4 episodes
2019	Cleaning Up	Mary	2 episodes
2019	Vera	Elaine Sidden	Episode: "The Seagull"
2020	Silent Witness	Professor Katherine Dukes	Episodes: "The Greater Good: Parts 1 & 2"
2022	Dangerous Liaisons	Madama Jericho	Episodes: "Love or War", "Conquer or Die"
2022, 2024	Trying	Bev	4 episodes
2022, 2025	The Sandman	Mad Hettie	6 episodes
2026	Gone	Carol Bradley	6 episodes

== Selected theatre performances ==
- Countess Hechingen in The Deep Man by Hugo von Hofmannsthal. British premiere directed by Casper Wrede at the Royal Exchange, Manchester (1979).
- Alexa Rollo in Rollo by Marcel Achard. Directed by David Thompson at the Royal Exchange, Manchester (1980).
- Judith in Blood, Black and Gold by Gerard McLarnon. World premiere directed by Braham Murray at the Royal Exchange, Manchester (1980).
- Isabella in Measure for Measure. Directed by Braham Murray at the Royal Exchange, Manchester (1981).
- Jocasta in Oedipus (2008) at Oliver Theatre, National Theatre.
- Gertrude in Hamlet (2010). A performance was recorded as "National Theatre Live: Hamlet".
- Edna in A Delicate Balance (2014) at Broadway, also starring Glenn Close.

== Awards and nominations ==
Higgins was awarded the Laurence Olivier Theatre Award in 1995 (1994 season) for Best Actress in a Play for her performance in Sweet Bird of Youth at the Royal National Theatre. She won the same award in both 2002 and 2005: in 2002 for her performance in Vincent in Brixton performed at the Royal National Theatre, Cottesloe and Wyndham's Theatres, and in 2005 for her performance as Hecuba in the Euripides tragedy at the Donmar Warehouse. She received the 2002 Critics' Circle Theatre Award for Best Actress for her performance in Vincent in Brixton. Additionally, she received the 1994 Critics Circle Theatre Award for Best Actress for her performances in The Children's Hour and Sweet Bird of Youth. She received the 2002 London Evening Standard Theatre Award for Best Actress for her performance in Vincent in Brixton at the Donmar Warehouse in London. In 2003, she was nominated for a Tony Award as Best Actress in a Play for Vincent in Brixton on Broadway, and garnered the 2003 Theatre World Award for outstanding major Broadway debut. She was nominated for Best Supporting Actress for her role in the horror film, Hellbound: Hellraiser II at the 16th Saturn Awards.
