= The Girl Who Died =

256 – "The Girl Who Died"
- Doctor Who episode

Cast
- Doctor: Peter Capaldi – Twelfth Doctor
- Companion: Jenna Coleman – Clara Oswald
- Others: Maisie Williams – Ashildr; David Schofield – Odin; Simon Lipkin – Nollarr; Ian Conningham – Chuckles; Tom Stourton – Lofty; Alastair Parker – Limpy; Murray McArthur – Hasten; Barnaby Kay – Heidi

Production
- Directed by: Ed Bazalgette
- Written by: Jamie Mathieson and Steven Moffat
- Produced by: Derek Ritchie
- Executive producers: Steven Moffat; Brian Minchin
- Music by: Murray Gold
- Series: Series 9
- Running time: 46 minutes
- First broadcast: 17 October 2015

Chronology
← Preceded by "Before the Flood"	Followed by → "The Woman Who Lived"

"The Girl Who Died" is the fifth episode of the ninth series of the British science fiction television series Doctor Who. It was first broadcast on BBC One on 17 October 2015, and was written by Jamie Mathieson and Steven Moffat and directed by Ed Bazalgette.

In the episode, the alien time traveller the Twelfth Doctor (Peter Capaldi) and his companion Clara (Jenna Coleman) have 24 hours to train a group of weak Viking villagers for a war against aliens called the Mire shortly after the Mire slaughtered all of the village's warriors and a woman called Ashildr (Maisie Williams) subsequently declared war.

The episode was watched by 6.56 million viewers and received highly positive reviews from critics, who praised the humour, the performances and the resolution to the Doctor's face.

== Plot ==
The Twelfth Doctor and Clara are taken to a village by some Vikings. The Doctor claims to be Odin, but the villagers are not fooled, as a figure also claiming to be Odin appears in the sky, offering to take the warriors to Valhalla. A squad of warriors in armoured suits materialise, shooting the Vikings with weapons that appear to disintegrate them. Clara and Ashildr, a woman from the village, are also struck. The squad soon disappears.

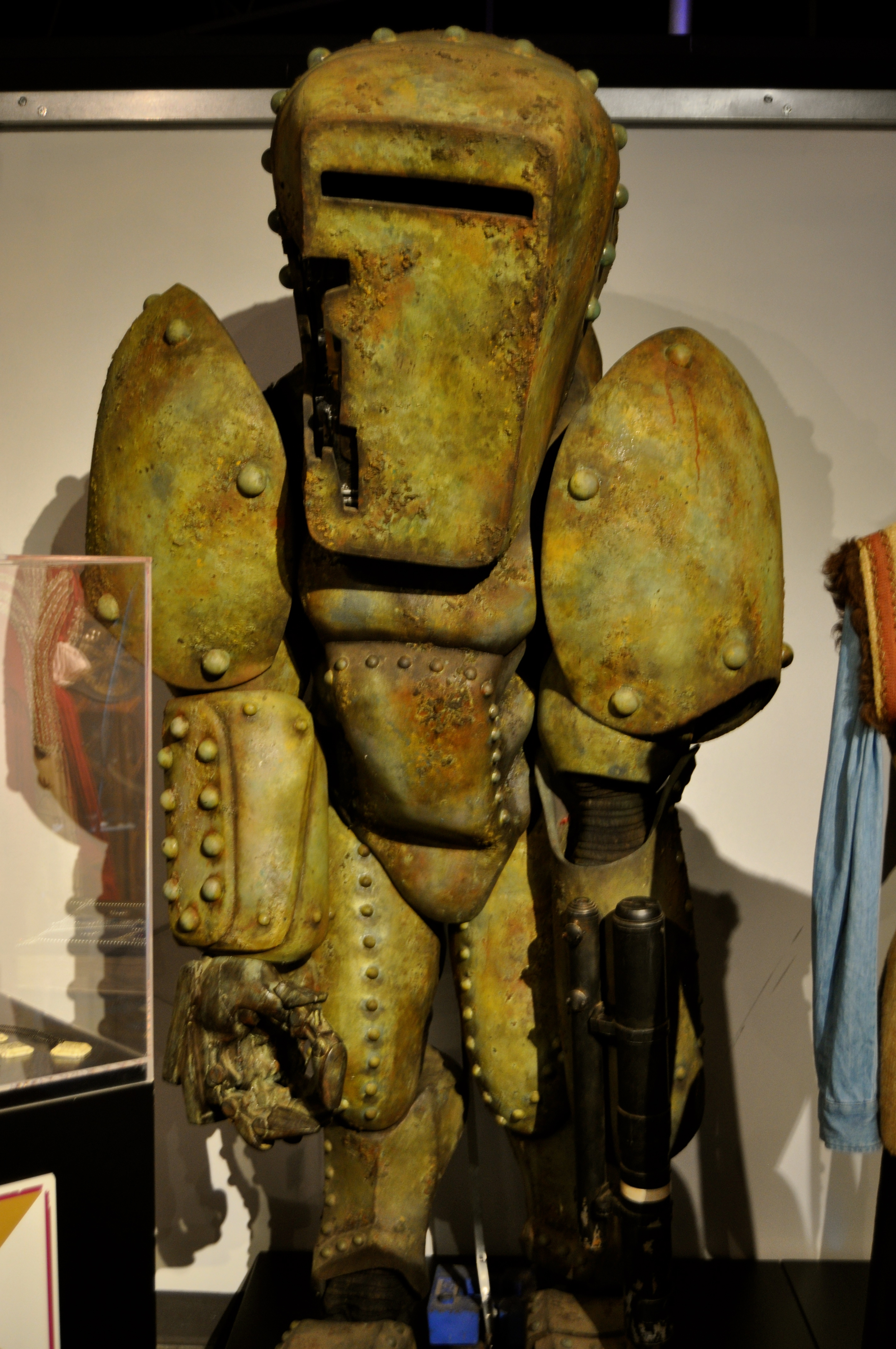
A Mire costume at the Doctor Who Experience

Clara and Ashildr find themselves on a spacecraft with the other Vikings. The men are killed and drained of their adrenaline and testosterone, while Clara and Ashildr meet Odin, the leader of the Mire species that pride themselves on their merciless conquests. Before Clara can stop her, Ashildr declares war on the Mire, and Odin grants them 24 hours to prepare. On Earth, Clara brings the Doctor up to speed. He recognises the villagers are too weak to fight, and devises a plan using Ashildr's storytelling skills and a supply of electric eels.

When the Mire arrive, they find the villagers celebrating. The Mire's confusion gives the Doctor time to stun them with electricity and pull one of the helmets off with an electromagnet. The Doctor modifies this and has Ashildr wear it, allowing her to envision an articulated puppet as a dragon, which is broadcast to the other Mire and scares them off. Odin vows to attack again, but the Doctor threatens to send video footage of the rout captured by Clara's phone to the universe unless they leave Earth. Odin and the Mire peacefully depart.

The village celebrates its victory until they find Ashildr died from the helmet's use. The Doctor is frustrated until he remembers why he took the form of Caecilius: (Note: A sculptor from Pompeii whose life is saved by the Tenth Doctor in the 2008 episode "The Fires of Pompeii") to always save someone, no matter what. He "breaks the rules" and modifies two chips from the Mire's helmets, one of which he implants in Ashildr, and the other he gives to her father for later use. The chip rapidly regenerates Ashildr's body and she regains consciousness.

As they leave, the Doctor tells Clara he fears he gave Ashildr a fate worse than death as the chip will never fail, effectively making her immortal and alone. He provided the second chip in hope she would give it to one she cares for.

=== Continuity ===
After meeting the Vikings, the Doctor produces a yo-yo in an attempt to impress them with "magic". A former companion, Leela, believes a yo-yo is magical when the Fourth Doctor provides her one to play with (The Robots of Death, 1977). The Twelfth Doctor previously used one simply to test the gravity in 2014's "Kill the Moon", as did the Fourth Doctor in The Ark in Space (1975).

The Doctor is seen leafing through a book entitled "2000 Year Diary", an upgraded version of the 500 Year Diary belonging to the Second Doctor (The Power of the Daleks, 1966) and the Fourth Doctor in The Sontaran Experiment, and the 900 Year Diary of the Seventh Doctor (Doctor Who, 1996).

The Doctor's ability to "speak baby" is demonstrated again in this episode. It appeared previously in the Eleventh Doctor stories "A Good Man Goes to War" and "Closing Time".

As he is adapting a Mire helmet, the Doctor claims he is "reversing the polarity of the neutron flow", a phrase said many times in various ways during Doctor Who, beginning with the Third Doctor.

David Tennant and Catherine Tate appear in flashbacks as the Tenth Doctor and Donna Noble, respectively, in scenes from "The Fires of Pompeii" (2008) in which Peter Capaldi also starred. A flashback from "Deep Breath" (2014), the eighth series' opening episode, also appears as the Doctor finally understands why he chose his current face.

The Doctor says Ashildr is now a "hybrid", echoing a prophecy related by Davros in "The Magician's Apprentice" / "The Witch's Familiar" – two great warrior races, speculated to be the Time Lords and the Daleks, would merge to become a "hybrid". It now appears that, instead, it is a merger between Vikings and the Mire.

At the end of the episode, the Doctor reflects on the potential consequences of his decision to save Ashildr, and possibly making her immortal, by saying "time will tell, it always does". This is a statement the Seventh Doctor uses at the end of Remembrance of the Daleks (1988), referring to his decision to destroy Davros and Skaro, and whether it was a 'good' decision.

=== Outside references ===
Odin's face appearing in the sky to talk to his disciples directly references a scene in Monty Python and the Holy Grail in which God does the same thing.

Clara suggests, and the Doctor agrees, that The Benny Hill Show's theme song Yakety Sax be used as the soundtrack for the video of Odin and the other Mire retreating from the dragon puppet. She plays a few seconds' clip with Yakety Sax's opening notes added.

== Production ==
Filming took place at Margam Castle, Castell Coch, Llanharan, and Marble Hall within Cardiff Town Hall.

=== Casting ===
Odin was originally to have been played by Brian Blessed, who had previously played King Yrcanos in 1986's Mindwarp, and had been offered the role of the Second Doctor in 1966. Blessed, however, was forced to pull out, and was replaced by David Schofield.

== Broadcast and reception ==
Doctor Who came second for the day with 4.63 million viewers in overnight ratings, an increase from the previous episode. Overall the episode had 6.56 million viewers, the highest figure of the series thus far, with a 28.1% share. It received an Appreciation Index score of 82.

=== Critical reception ===
Professional ratings
Aggregate scores
Source	Rating
Rotten Tomatoes (Average Score)	8.33
Rotten Tomatoes (Tomatometer)	95%
Review scores
Source	Rating
The A.V. Club	A
Paste Magazine	9.6
SFX Magazine	4/5 stars
TV Fanatic	4.3/5 stars
IndieWire	A++
IGN	8.8
New York Magazine	5/5 stars
Daily Telegraph	3/5 stars
Radio Times	5/5 stars

The episode received very positive reviews from critics, with many praising the episode's humour, the resolution with regards to the Doctor's face, and the performances of Capaldi, Coleman and Williams. The episode also achieved a score of 95% on Rotten Tomatoes based on 19 reviews, with an average score of 8.1. The site's consensus reads "With a stellar guest-star performance by Maisie Williams, "The Girl Who Died" sets thrillingly high stakes, while still maintaining the playful tone we've come to expect from Peter Capaldi's incarnation of Doctor Who".

Patrick Mulkern of Radio Times awarded the episode a perfect five star rating, claiming that "Jamie Mathieson and Steven Moffat invest a traditional formula with a twist of unpredictability and immortality". He further went on to say that the episode "taps into a very traditional vein but again slyly transcends it, and achieves that holy grail of TV drama – unpredictability", also claiming that "everything that is meant to be funny is funny and the sad moments are sad", while praising the episode's direction as "impeccable". Scott Collura of IGN also lavished praise on the episode, awarding it a score of 8.8/10, deemed by the site as "great". He especially praised Capaldi's performance, labelling it "big and touching", while also enjoying "the introduction of Maisie Williams' character" and the episode's "big thematic touches". He summarised his review by stating "Doctor Who continues its strong season with the much-anticipated arrival of Maisie Williams as 'The Girl Who Died.' While the revelation of who her character actually is may come as something of a letdown for longtime fans, the episode itself and its bigger thematic touches more than make up for that". Catherine Gee of The Daily Telegraph also enjoyed the episode, calling it "fast paced" and claiming that it "set up all the right ingredients for something big next week". She also said "The attack and battle sequence zipped through at speed. If it felt a little rushed it didn't hugely matter, as it was clearly setting up for a bigger second half".

Alasdair Wilkins of The A.V. Club highly acclaimed the episode, awarding it a perfect "A" grade – the first of this series – and stated that "the writing, the acting, the directing combine to create what is quite possibly the best episode yet of this Doctor's tenure". He called the episode "fantastically funny whenever it wants to be", but also heavily praised the subplot of the Doctor's face, calling the reveal "wonderfully simple". He closed his review by labeling the episode "a damn triumph. More than that, it's a triumph because it feels so resolutely like a Doctor Who episode", and stated that the episode "remembers that what motivates the Doctor's decisions are fundamentally the same emotions that we all feel, and that's what makes this such a brilliant hour of television". Morgan Jeffery of Digital Spy also praised the episode, calling it "unlike anything you've seen before". He called the episode "fast-paced, with sharp, funny dialogue and some great clowning from Peter Capaldi" and further praising Williams as "nicely ethereal in the part, without ever overplaying the character's enigmatic nature". He closed his review by saying "while Doctor Who shouldn't be like this every week, the show's boundless variety has always been its biggest selling point, and it's refreshing to see 'The Girl Who Died' break the mould and dare to be entirely unpredictable and different".

Kaite Welsh of IndieWire also acclaimed the episode, awarding it an A++ grade, the highest score available. She said that the episode marked the "fifth stellar episode in a row", and that it represented "the show doing historical episodes as they're meant to be done. It's like 'Fires of Pompeii', 'Robot of Sherwood' and classic Third Doctor adventure 'The Time Warrior' all mixed into one—literally—electrifying episode". Mark Rozeman of Paste Magazine also responded highly positively to the episode, awarding it a score of 9.6 and saying that it "stands up remarkably as its own story". They closed their review by stating "As with the best Who adventures, it explores more complexities of time travel, whilst never losing a sense of whimsy and fun. It's another home run in a season that, so far, has a pretty great batting average".

== In print ==
The Girl Who Died
- Author: Jane Rollason
- Series: Doctor Who novelisations
- Publisher: Pearson Education
- Publication date: 25 June 2019
- ISBN: 9781292206134

Pearson Education published a novelisation of this episode by Jane Rollason for students of English language reading on 19 July 2018.
