= The Woman Who Lived =

257 – "The Woman Who Lived"
- Doctor Who episode

Cast
- Doctor: Peter Capaldi – Twelfth Doctor
- Companion: Jenna Coleman – Clara Oswald
- Others: Maisie Williams – Me; Rufus Hound – Sam Swift; Gareth Berliner – Coachman; Elisabeth Hopper – Lucie Fanshawe; John Voce – Mr Fanshawe; Struan Rodger – Clayton; Gruffudd Glyn – Pikeman Lloyd Llywelyn; Reuben Johnson – Pikeman William Stout; Ariyon Bakare – Leandro; Daniel Fearn – Crowd 1; Karen Seacombe – Crowd 2; John Hales – Hangman; Will Brown – Voice of The Knightmare

Production
- Directed by: Ed Bazalgette
- Written by: Catherine Tregenna
- Produced by: Derek Ritchie
- Executive producers: Steven Moffat; Brian Minchin
- Music by: Murray Gold
- Series: Series 9
- Running time: 46 minutes
- First broadcast: 24 October 2015

Chronology
← Preceded by "The Girl Who Died"	Followed by → "The Zygon Invasion"

"The Woman Who Lived" is the sixth episode of the ninth series of the British science fiction television series Doctor Who. It was first broadcast on BBC One on 24 October 2015. It was written by Catherine Tregenna and directed by Ed Bazalgette.

Set in 1651, about 800 years after the previous week's episode, "The Girl Who Died", the episode follows the alien time traveller the Twelfth Doctor (Peter Capaldi), while on the trail of an alien artefact that came to Earth, reuniting with Ashildr (Maisie Williams), the woman the Doctor made immortal in the previous episode. Ashildr, having renamed herself "Me", has isolated herself from mortal humans and seeks to use the artefact herself to travel to other planets.

The episode was watched by 6.11 million viewers and received widespread praise. Aspects that were met with the most praise were Capaldi and Williams's performances and the script.

== Plot ==
Alone and on the trail of an alien artefact, the Twelfth Doctor interrupts a highwayman known as "the Knightmare" carrying out a highway robbery of Lucie Fanshawe in 1651 England. The Doctor finds the artefact in the coach's luggage but the vehicle drives off before he can take it. The Doctor finds that the robber is Ashildr, the Viking girl he made immortal. (Note: As depicted in the previous week's episode "The Girl Who Died".) Over her 800 years of everlasting life, she has lost many of her memories and has isolated herself in order to avoid the pain of losing loved ones. The Doctor learns that she has renamed herself "Me" due to her loneliness. He also discovers that Me previously had three children, all of whom she lost to the Black Death.

Me and the Doctor steal the artefact from Lucie's house, flee by climbing out of the chimney and escape an ambush by a rival highwayman, Sam Swift. The next morning, the Doctor meets Me's ally Leandro, a leonine alien stranded on Earth who uses the artefact to open portals into space. In return for Me tricking the Doctor into helping him, Leandro has agreed to let her come with him to travel the galaxy. For the portal to be activated, the artefact requires another person's death. Two pikemen, unaware that Me is the Knightmare, arrive to announce that the Knightmare is reported to be in the area and Sam Swift is about to be hanged at Tyburn. Me hands the Doctor over to them, claiming that he is the Knightmare's accomplice and sets off to use Swift's death to activate the artefact.

The Doctor escapes the pikemen by offering them Me's treasury and pursues Me to the hanging. Me attaches the artefact to Swift's chest, killing him and opening a portal. Leandro then reveals that he really wants to assist his people in invading Earth. Spaceships begin destroying the crowd gathered to watch the hanging. Me, rediscovering her conscience and humanity after seeing the crowds slaughtered, uses the second Mire medical chip given to her by the Doctor to save Swift's life and close the portal. Leandro's people kill him for his failure. Afterwards, Me states that she will remain the Doctor's friend and will look after those that the Doctor leaves behind.

=== Continuity ===
The Doctor informs Me that the imminent Great Fire of London was caused by the Terileptils, referring to the Fifth Doctor story, The Visitation (1982).

The Doctor states that he is "on record as being against banter". This is a reference to "Robot of Sherwood" when the Doctor chastises Robin Hood and his Merry Men for their light-hearted banter.

The Doctor informs Me that she may come across Captain Jack Harkness, given that his life, like hers, is indefinitely extended. The Doctor already expressed his dislike and avoidance of immortals in a conversation with Jack in Series 3's episode "Utopia".

=== Outside references ===
The Doctor calls Me 'Zorro' after the masked outlaw created by Johnston McCulley, first appearing in 1919.

== Production ==
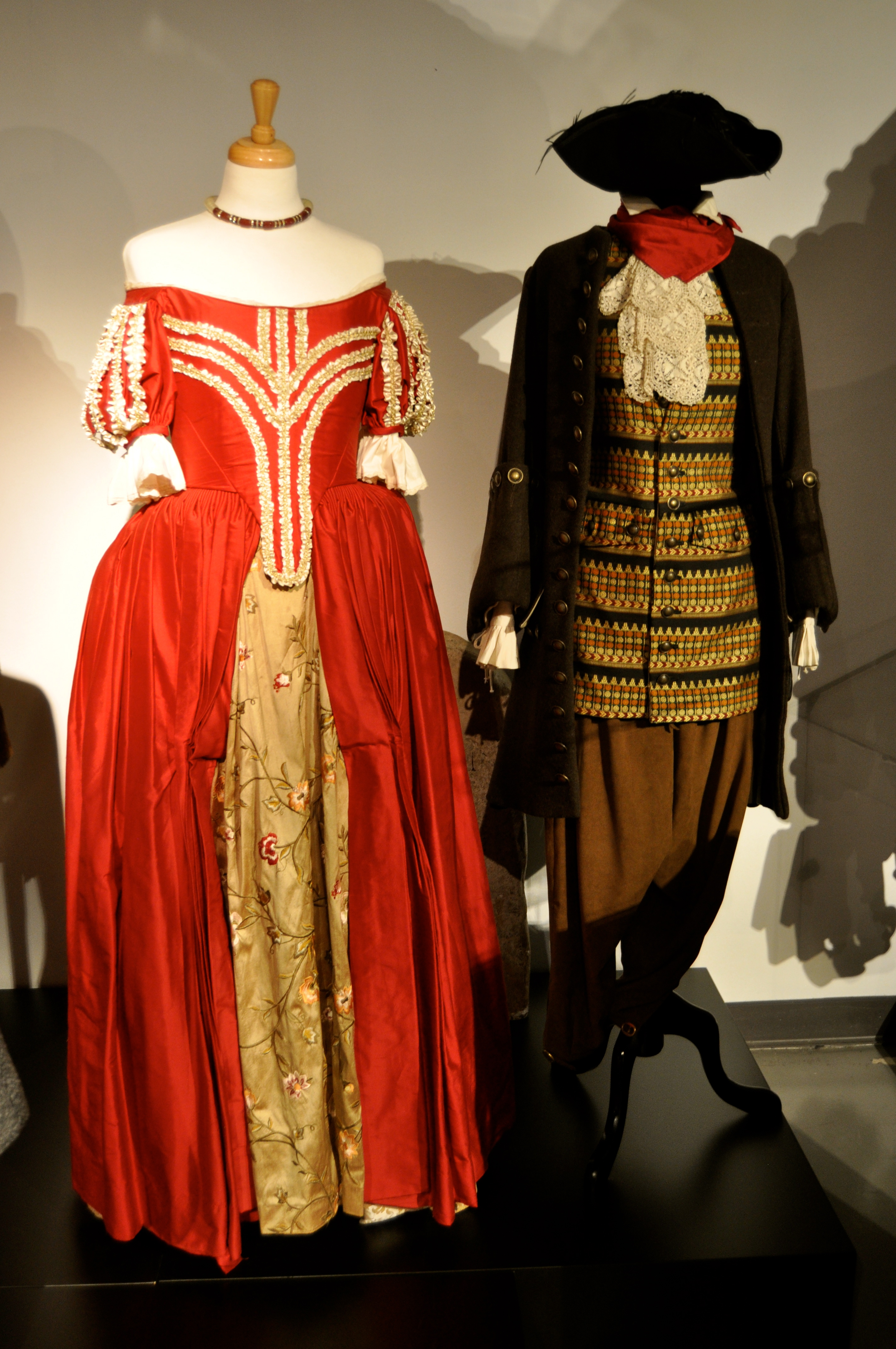
Me's costumes for the episode, on display at the Doctor Who Experience.

=== Cast notes ===
Struan Rodger previously provided the voice of the Face of Boe in three episodes between Series 2 and Series 3.

== Broadcast and reception ==
The episode was watched by 4.39 million viewers overnight in the UK. It received a 20.0% audience share. Consolidated ratings show 6.11 million watched this episode on time shift. It received an Appreciation Index score of 81.

=== Critical reception ===
Professional ratings
Aggregate scores
Source	Rating
Rotten Tomatoes (Average Score)	8.89
Rotten Tomatoes (Tomatometer)	85%
Review scores
Source	Rating
The A.V. Club	A
Paste Magazine	9.8
SFX Magazine	4.5/5 stars
TV Fanatic	3.5/5 stars
IndieWire	A
IGN	9.2
New York Magazine	4/5 stars
Daily Telegraph	5/5 stars
Radio Times	4/5 stars

"The Woman Who Lived" received widespread praise, with many critics labeling it the best of the current series. On Rotten Tomatoes the episode has a score of 85% based on reviews from 20 critics, with an average score of 9.0, being beaten by Heaven Sent. The site's consensus reads: "The Woman Who Lived" concludes a Doctor Who story for the ages, with a performance by Maisie Williams that is both fun and thought-provoking". Elements of the episode especially praised by critics included the performances of Capaldi and Williams, the episode's dark visual tone and the dialogue between the Doctor and Me.

Catherine Gee of The Daily Telegraph awarded the episode a full five stars, citing Peter Capaldi's performance as a standout, as well as Catherine Tregenna's screenplay: "It was, at times, a beautifully written episode – and less clunky than some of Steven Moffat’s offerings. With an aged, well-read, worldly wise pair to play with, scriptwriter Catherine Tregenna was able to give the dialogue a literary feel." Writing for IGN, Scott Collura gave the episode a 9.2–"Excellent" rating, praising the conclusion of the Me arc and dropping hints for the second half of the season. He called the episode "fun but also heavy", and praised other aspects of the episode including the parallels between the Doctor and Me, the exploration of Me's past and Clara's mysterious absence from the story. Ross Ruediger of Vulture.com also responded positively to the episode, particularly praising "the complex back and forth between the Doctor and Ashildr/Lady Me" as "remarkable". He also praised Ed Bazalgette's direction and ultimately awarded the episode four stars out of five. Patrick Mulkern of Radio Times also awarded the episode four stars out of five, calling it "a dark and beautiful study of immortality and short lives". He especially acclaimed the episode's visual style, saying "The first 19 minutes takes place in the dead of night, the only available light coming from candles or the Moon. It all looks fabulous and is a triumph for the director Ed Bazalgette and director of photography Richard Stoddard". He also stated that "The philosophical interludes between the Time Lord and Ashildr are what make this sing" and praised Williams' performance as "superb".

The A.V. Club's Alasdair Wilkins acclaimed the episode, awarding it a perfect 'A' grade for the second week in a row. He especially praised Maisie Williams's performance, declaring "Her work in last week’s The Girl Who Died was very good, bringing nuance and humanity to what in lesser hands might just feel like just another random historical character with hints of deeper mystery. But her work in 'The Woman Who Lived' is an order of magnitude better, if only because she is asked to do so much more here than she was last week." Though Wilkins found fault with the episode's "quickie" climax resolution, he ultimately believed that: "[W]hatever small deficiencies there might be in the ancillary elements are more than offset by how strong the core of this episode is." He closed his review by stating "The episode's meditation on the sorrow of immortality is more than enough to vault this into the show's uppermost echelon". Mark Rozeman of Paste Magazine also heavily praised the episode, awarding it a score of 9.8 out of 10, the highest of the season thus far. Labelling the episode "first and foremost a character study", he further said that the episode "stands as perhaps the strongest entry of Season Nine thus far". He closed his review by stating "Despite its lavish production design as well as impressive stunts and effects, it’s an episode that ends up feeling highly insular and contained in a way that few Who stories do", and also praising Capaldi and Williams' performances as "compelling" while ultimately calling the episode "a crowning achievement to an already strong half-a-season". Kaite Welsh also lavished praise onto the episode, calling it "legendary" and "a seminal episode for the series". She further stated that it "should be an episode that goes down in Doctor Who history", closing her review by saying that the episode "was so good it defies letter grades" – she ultimately awarded it a perfect 'A' grade.

== In print ==
The Woman Who Lived
- Author: Chris Rice
- Series: Doctor Who novelisations
- Publisher: Pearson Education
- Publication date: 25 June 2019
- ISBN: 9781292205892

Pearson Education published a novelisation of this episode by Chris Rice for students of English language reading on 26 July 2018.
