= The Magician's Apprentice (Doctor Who) =

254a – "The Magician's Apprentice"
- Doctor Who episode
- Davros, creator of the Daleks, as he appears in the episode

Cast
- Doctor: Peter Capaldi – Twelfth Doctor
- Companion: Jenna Coleman – Clara Oswald
- Others: Michelle Gomez – Missy; Jami Reid-Quarrell – Colony Sarff; Julian Bleach – Davros; Jemma Redgrave – Kate Stewart; Jaye Griffiths – Jac; Harki Bhambra – Mike; Daniel Hoffmann-Gill – Bors; Joey Price – Boy; Benjamin Cawley – Kanzo; Aaron Neil – Mr Dunlop; Clare Higgins – Ohila; Nicholas Briggs – Voice of the Daleks; Kelly Hunter – Shadow Architect; India Ria Amarteifio – Alison; Dasharn Anderson – Ryan; Stefan Adegbola, Shin-Fei Chen, Lucy Newman-Williams – Newsreaders; Barnaby Edwards, Nicholas Pegg – Daleks; Jonathon Ojinnaka – Soldier

Production
- Directed by: Hettie MacDonald
- Written by: Steven Moffat
- Produced by: Peter Bennett
- Executive producers: Steven Moffat; Brian Minchin
- Music by: Murray Gold
- Series: Series 9
- Running time: 1st of 2-part story, 46 minutes
- First broadcast: 19 September 2015

Chronology
← Preceded by "Last Christmas"	Followed by → "The Witch's Familiar"

"The Magician's Apprentice" is the first episode of the ninth series of the British science fiction television series Doctor Who. It was first broadcast on BBC One on 19 September 2015. The episode was written by showrunner Steven Moffat and directed by Hettie MacDonald. It is the first of a two-part story; the second part, "The Witch's Familiar", aired on 26 September.

In the episode, the alien time traveller the Doctor (Peter Capaldi) disappears and gives a confession dial—his version of a last will and testament—to his former childhood friend Missy (Michelle Gomez). Missy and the Doctor's companion Clara (Jenna Coleman) track down the location of the Doctor before his expected death, and the three are taken prisoner on the planet Skaro where a weak and dying Davros (Julian Bleach)—an enemy of the Doctor and the creator of the Dalek race—seeks the Doctor after recalling an encounter from Davros' childhood.

Filming began in February 2015 in Tenerife, Spain. The episode was watched by 6.54 million viewers and received positive reviews.

== Prologues ==
=== Prologue ===
The Twelfth Doctor has returned to the planet Karn. There, Ohila of the Sisterhood explains that someone has been seeking him across all time and space. She asks the Doctor if he will go, insisting: "You owe that creature nothing." He says that he will, but that he will first 'hang out' for a bit.

=== "The Doctor's Meditation" ===
Another prologue to the episode, titled "The Doctor's Meditation", was released in Russia, Canada, the United States and Denmark on 15 and 16 September 2015, alongside a 3D cinematic release of "Dark Water" and "Death in Heaven". On 18 September, this was released on Facebook in the United Kingdom, and also made available through other online channels. In this prologue, the Doctor appears in medieval times alongside Bors, who appears to be a loyal friend, and in the 6 minute clip, questions who he must face, asking whether he faces an old friend or a foe. The Doctor replies that he must meditate, but has trouble doing so.

== Plot ==
The Doctor, travelling across a war-ravaged landscape, encounters a young boy trapped in a field of "handmines". After throwing the boy his sonic screwdriver so he can communicate with him, the Doctor encourages the boy and tries to save him, until he learns that the boy is Davros, the future creator of the Daleks, and as a result, abandons him.

On present-day Earth, all the planes are frozen in mid-flight. Clara is summoned to UNIT headquarters to help contact the Doctor. While there, they are contacted by Missy, who needed to get UNIT's attention to arrange a meeting with Clara. At a café, Missy asks Clara for help finding the Doctor as Missy had received his "confession dial", the Time Lords' equivalent of a last will and testament, and believes the Doctor may think he is dying. Clara helps Missy track down the Doctor to Essex in 1138.

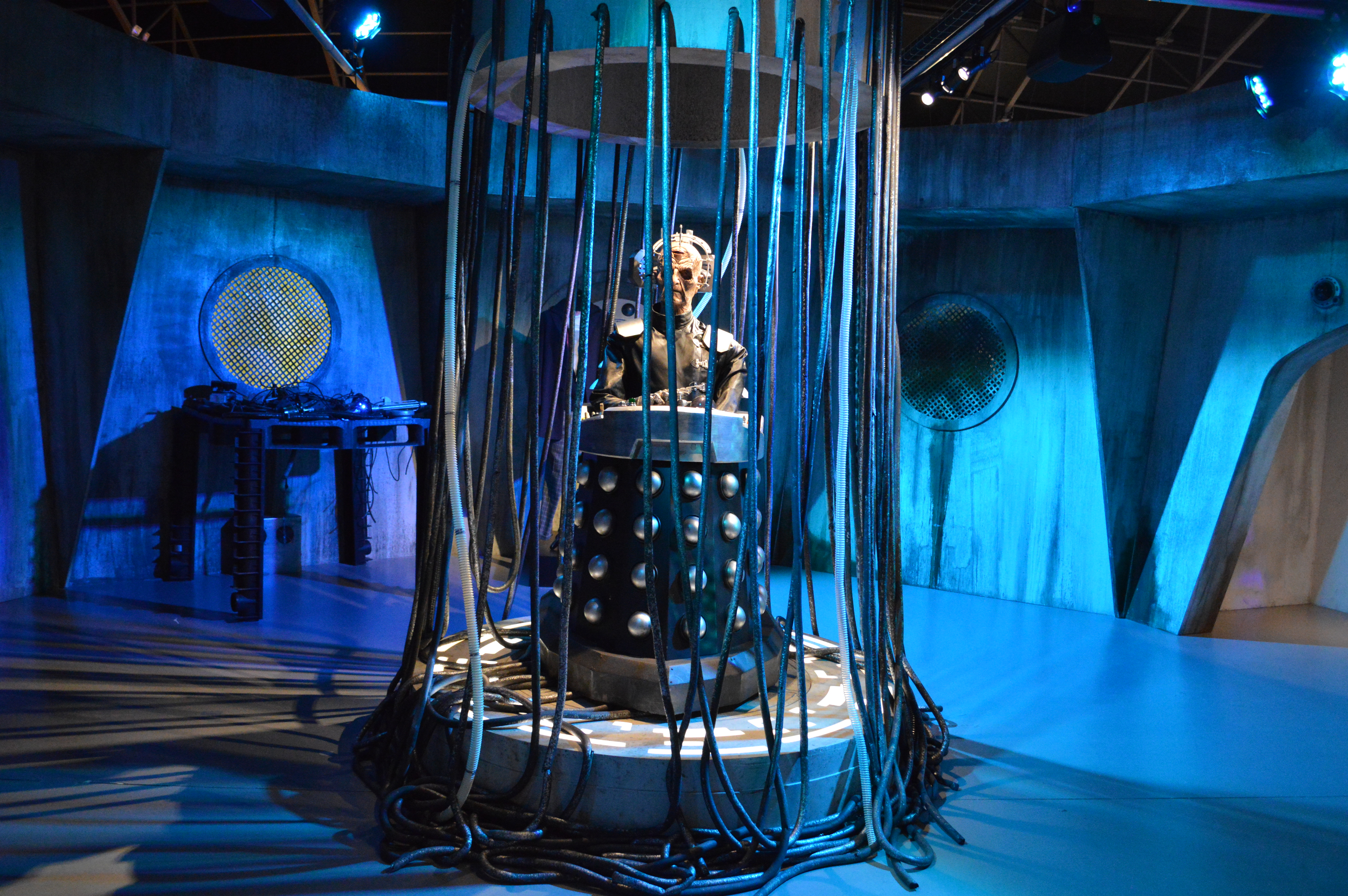
Davros on the Skaro set, on display at the Doctor Who Experience

Clara and Missy find the Doctor has spent the last three weeks partying. Colony Sarff, a composite being made from numerous snakes, and an agent of Davros, tells the Doctor that Davros is dying. Sarff presents the Doctor with the sonic screwdriver the Doctor gave to Davros years before. The Doctor feels shame for having abandoned Davros as a boy, and agrees to be taken away; Missy and Clara persuade Sarff to take them as well. As they leave, Bors is revealed to be a Dalek "puppet" and secures the Doctor's TARDIS for the Daleks.

Sarff takes them to a space station, and the Doctor is led alone to Davros, who shames the Doctor for his actions in the past. Meanwhile, Missy is suspicious of the gravity of the station, and shows Clara that the station is just an illusion, as they are on the planet Skaro, the Dalek homeworld. They are captured by the Daleks and taken to a room where the TARDIS has been procured. The Doctor attempts to plead for their lives, but Davros says he has no control over the Daleks, and Missy, Clara, and the TARDIS are seemingly destroyed. Davros derides the Doctor's compassion as his "greatest indulgence" and wants him to confess, finally, that "compassion is wrong".

On the battleground, the Doctor speaks to young Davros in the Doctor's personal future. The Doctor pulls out a Dalek weapon and vows to save his friend the only way he can.

=== Continuity ===
A Kaled soldier is depicted armed with a bow and arrow; this is an allusion to a line spoken by Harry Sullivan in Genesis of the Daleks (1975): "they're going to finish off with bows and arrows".

Colony Sarff visits the Maldovarium, a bar last seen in 2011's "A Good Man Goes to War". The scene features several returning aliens: the Sycorax, the Hath, the Ood and a Tivolian. The Shadow Proclamation, an intergalactic police force last appearing in 2008's "The Stolen Earth", also briefly returns, featuring the Shadow Architect (from the same episode) and a Judoon.

The Sisterhood of Karn, already seen in the 2013 teaser "The Night of the Doctor", originally appeared in the 1976 serial The Brain of Morbius.

UNIT seeks the Doctor using a computer algorithm, plotting on a map the locations of various crises at which he has been rumoured to have appeared. These correspond with locales for many of the Doctor's past adventures: San Martino (The Masque of Mandragora); New York City (The Chase, "Daleks in Manhattan"/"Evolution of the Daleks", and "The Angels Take Manhattan") and three possible appearances in Atlantis (The Time Monster, The Underwater Menace, and The Dæmons).

Davros plays excerpts from his prior conversations with the Doctor's earlier incarnations, ranging from Genesis of the Daleks to "The Stolen Earth". Most notably, he shows footage (from Genesis of the Daleks) of the Fourth Doctor asking the question "if someone who knew the future pointed out a child to you and told you that that child would grow up totally evil, to be a ruthless dictator who would destroy millions of lives, could you then kill that child?"

Several different designs of the Daleks from across the series' history reappear in the episode, alongside their creator, Davros, and their home planet, Skaro. The first Dalek shown in the episode is a blue-and-silver model as first seen in 1963.

=== Outside references ===
Clara, upon deducing the Doctor's location and intent, says "Do not go gentle into that good night", the first line of the titular poem by Dylan Thomas.

When the Doctor spies Clara and Missy, he plays the opening notes to Roy Orbison's "Oh, Pretty Woman".

The Doctor's playing electric guitar and teaching medieval people the term "dude" echoes the movies Bill & Ted's Excellent Adventure and Bill & Ted's Bogus Journey, films featuring two rocker teens who travel back in time – in a telephone call box – and teach historical figures their customs. Actor Peter Capaldi plays the guitar himself and was part of a punk rock band called The Dreamboys in the early 1980s alongside Craig Ferguson.

== Production ==
Shooting on the episode began on 12 February. To provide the necessary Dalek props, some were taken from the nearby Doctor Who Experience exhibition. Scenes set on Skaro's surface were filmed on Tenerife, one of the Canary Islands'.

=== Cast notes ===
Kelly Hunter had previously appeared as the Shadow Architect in the series 4 episode "The Stolen Earth", with Julian Bleach also having appeared as Davros in that episode and its conclusion, "Journey's End". Clare Higgins played Ohila of the Sisterhood of Karn in the mini-episode "The Night of the Doctor", which was part of the 50th Anniversary specials in 2013, and again in the season finale "Hell Bent". Jami Reid-Quarrell made a subsequent appearance as "The Veil" in "Heaven Sent", the penultimate episode of Series 9.

== Promotion ==
The trailer for the episode was released on 5 September 2015.

=== Cinema screenings ===
A cinema screening of "The Magician's Apprentice" was held on 27 August 2015 in Edinburgh as part of The Guardian Edinburgh International Television Festival. It was also screened along with "The Witch's Familiar" on 10 September 2015 in Cardiff by BAFTA Cymru with a Q&A session following.

== Broadcast and reception ==
The episode was watched by 6.54 million viewers, the lowest consolidated rating for the programme since the Matt Smith episode "The Crimson Horror". There were 1.3 million "download requests" through the BBC's iplayer service. The overnight viewing figures indicated the episode was watched by 4.58 million viewers on BBC1, the lowest overnight figure for a series opener since the show returned in 2005. It gained a 21.2% share of its timeslot and came second for the night, behind The X Factor. It received an Appreciation Index score of 84. The episode broke records on BBC America with 1.1 million viewers in the 18–49 category. All together, 1.97 million watched on the night in the United States.

=== Critical reception ===
Professional ratings
Aggregate scores
Source	Rating
Rotten Tomatoes (Average Score)	8.7/10
Rotten Tomatoes (Tomatometer)	83%
Review scores
Source	Rating
The A.V. Club	B
Paste Magazine	8.5
SFX Magazine	5/5 stars
TV Fanatic	4/5 stars
IndieWire	A+
IGN	9.4
New York Magazine	5/5 stars
Daily Telegraph	3/5 stars
Radio Times	5/5 stars

On Rotten Tomatoes, 83% of 18 critics gave the episode a positive review, with an average rating of 8.7/10. The site's consensus reads, "In 'The Magician's Apprentice', Peter Capaldi and the writers settle into an emotionally engaging tone while raising the stakes for the Twelfth Doctor".

Scott Collura of IGN awarded the episode a 9.4 out of ten, deemed "amazing". He went on to say "The Twelfth Doctor can have lots of fun in this episode, but he can also hit some real dark patches too. And it’s the climatic[sic] reveal/cliffhanger here that will help bring this Doctor towards the latter emotional state". He further praised the episode's writing, stating that the episode "[delivers] a real jolt to the system for both the Doctor and the viewer to start off Season 9".

Patrick Mulkern of Radio Times rated the episode as 5/5, praising the episode's story and concept. He said "Steven Moffat promised us a season opener that feels like a finale and, boy, does he deliver. In fact he delivers boy. Boy Davros. A brilliant idea – just waiting for someone to have it". However, he also noted that "there’s no real sense of jeopardy . . . in a universe where everything is now 'unzappable'". Nick Setchfield of SFX also gave the episode five stars, claiming it was "full of wit and menace" and "unafraid to take on the show's museum piece classics". However, Benji Wilson in The Daily Telegraph gave it 3/5, saying that the "jury is still out" and questioning whether "seemingly catastrophic events" can be very thrilling in the Doctor Who universe which "keeps reminding you you're not supposed to take it seriously".

In 2023, The Daily Telegraph ranked the episode the 33rd best in the show's entire run.
