= The Witch's Familiar =

254b – "The Witch's Familiar"
- Doctor Who episode

Cast
- Doctor: Peter Capaldi – Twelfth Doctor
- Companion: Jenna Coleman – Clara Oswald
- Others: Michelle Gomez – Missy; Jami Reid-Quarrell – Colony Sarff; Julian Bleach – Davros; Joey Price – Boy; Nicholas Briggs – Voice of the Daleks; Barnaby Edwards, Nicholas Pegg – Daleks

Production
- Directed by: Hettie MacDonald
- Written by: Steven Moffat
- Produced by: Peter Bennett
- Executive producers: Steven Moffat; Brian Minchin
- Music by: Murray Gold
- Series: Series 9
- Running time: 2nd of 2-part story, 48 minutes
- First broadcast: 26 September 2015

Chronology
| ← Preceded by "The Magician's Apprentice" | Followed by → "Under the Lake" |

"The Witch's Familiar" is the second episode of the ninth series of the British science fiction television series Doctor Who. It was first broadcast on BBC One on 26 September 2015. It was written by Steven Moffat and directed by Hettie MacDonald, and is the second part of the story begun by "The Magician's Apprentice" on 19 September.

In the episode, Davros (Julian Bleach), the dying creator of the Dalek race, attempts to trick his enemy, alien time traveller the Doctor (Peter Capaldi), into using the Doctor's ability to regenerate to restore Davros and the Daleks on the planet Skaro. Meanwhile, the Doctor's former friend Missy (Michelle Gomez) and companion Clara (Jenna Coleman) attempt to enter the Daleks' city to save the Doctor's life. The episode received critical acclaim, with many praising Gomez' performance and the interactions between the Doctor and Davros.

Several different designs of the Daleks from across the series' history reappear in the episode, alongside their creator, Davros, and their home planet, Skaro.

== Plot ==
Clara and Missy are outside the Dalek city. Missy had rigged their vortex manipulators to make them appear to have died from the Dalek attack, a trick she learned from the Doctor; however, the manipulators have been destroyed. They make their way in through a sewer, which contains a number of decaying and insane Dalek mutants. They capture a Dalek using the mutants in the sewer and steal its casing, which Missy convinces Clara to pilot, to help them re-enter the city. Once inside, Clara finds any spoken expression of emotion or individual identity is translated into only "Exterminate!" or "I am a Dalek". Once they access the city, Missy abandons Clara.

The Doctor does not believe Clara is dead. While confronting Davros and the Supreme Dalek, the Doctor is knocked unconscious by Colony Sarff. When he wakes, the Doctor is back with Davros, who is attached to numerous cables that provide life-support to him from every Dalek. Davros tempts the Doctor to kill all the Daleks using the cables, but the Doctor reveals he came to express compassion to Davros having abandoned him as a boy in the past. To give Davros enough life to see the sun rise, the Doctor provides some of his regeneration energy, but this travels through the cables to every Dalek, creating new hybrid forms.

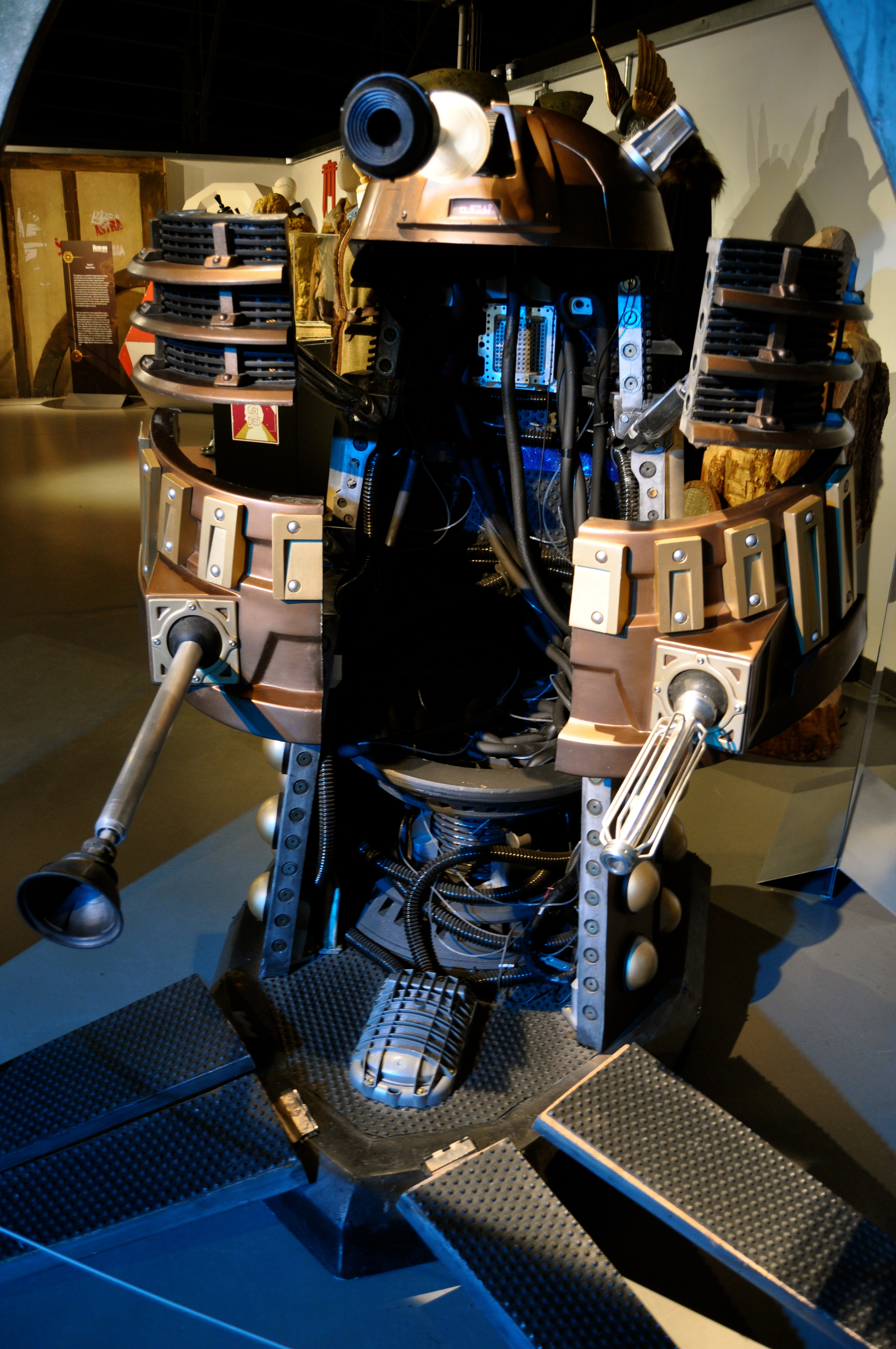
The Dalek casing into which Clara is forced, on display at the Doctor Who Experience.

Missy appears and saves the Doctor while killing Sarff. The Doctor, aware of Davros' plan, notes even the insane Daleks will regenerate. They arise and attack the city, seeking revenge. The Doctor and Missy escape and run into Clara, still within the Dalek casing and unable to identify herself. Missy tries to tell the Doctor that Clara was killed, but the Doctor is able to see through her lies, particularly when the "Dalek" asks for mercy. He frees Clara and tells Missy to run. Missy is cornered by a number of Daleks but suddenly claims to have a clever plan.

Using his new sonic sunglasses, the Doctor summons the TARDIS, which also had avoided destruction by its automated systems. As the Dalek city is destroyed, the Doctor recalls why the Dalek casing allowed Clara to express a plea for mercy, and realises what he must do. He travels to the battlefield that young Davros was caught in, and uses a Dalek gun to eradicate the "handmines" and escort Davros away. The boy asks which side he fights for, and the Doctor replies it does not matter as long as there is mercy.

=== Continuity ===
Missy and Clara teleport out of the city using the energy emitted by the Daleks, revealing how Missy survived after being shot by the Brigadier at the end of "Death in Heaven". The Fourth and First Doctors make brief appearances during Missy's exposition of her account of the Doctor's fight with 50 android assassins.

Among the past Dalek designs shown in this episode is the Special Weapons Dalek that first appeared in Remembrance of the Daleks (1988).

The scene where Clara is being put into the Dalek mirrors a scene from her debut episode, "Asylum of the Daleks" (2012). A similar tactic was used by Ian Chesterton in The Daleks (1963–64), the first Dalek serial of the original Doctor Who series, and again by Rebec, a Thal, in the Third Doctor serial Planet of the Daleks (1973).

Davros informs the Doctor that he has been given 'the only other chair on Skaro...' This references the first Dalek adventure; the Doctor's companion Barbara comments that on the Daleks' world, 'there wasn't any furniture, now I come to think about it...'

The Doctor lost his original sonic screwdriver when it was destroyed in the Fifth Doctor story The Visitation (1982). It wasn't replaced until the Seventh Doctor produced one in the 1996 Doctor Who movie. It remained a part of the Doctor's arsenal ever since, until this two-part episode.

When Davros tempts the Doctor with killing every Dalek on Skaro, knowingly committing genocide, he asks "Are you ready to be a god?" This echoes the debate the Fourth Doctor has with Davros in Genesis of the Daleks (1975); when the Doctor asks him whether he would knowingly unleash a virus that would destroy all life in the universe, Davros is intrigued at the concept: "Yes... I would do it. That power would set me up above the gods!" It also refers back to the climax of Genesis, when the Doctor agonizes over whether he has the moral right to destroy the newly created Daleks, ultimately deciding against genocide.

Davros' question to the Doctor – "Am I a good man? – is the same one the Doctor himself asks Clara in "Into the Dalek" (2014).

The TARDIS' Hostile Action Displacement System has been referred to on prior occasions. In the Eleventh Doctor story "Cold War" (2013), it caused the TARDIS to leave the area. The system was first used in the Second Doctor story The Krotons (1968–69), also making the TARDIS dematerialise to avoid destruction.

=== Outside references ===
Missy tells a Dalek to inform the Supreme Dalek that "the bitch is back", an allusion to the Elton John song, "The Bitch Is Back".

== Promotion ==
=== Cinema screenings ===
A screening for the opening two-parter took place on 10 September 2015 in Cardiff.

== Broadcast and reception ==
The episode was watched by 3.71 million viewers overnight in the UK, the lowest overnight figure of any episode since the show returned in 2005. The final consolidated ratings were 5.71 million viewers. The lower-than-expected ratings were likely due in part to competition from the England-Wales match in the 2015 Rugby World Cup, which aired the same evening. It received an Appreciation Index score of 83. In America, the episode had 1.12 million viewers on the night.

=== Critical reception ===
Professional ratings
Aggregate scores
| Source | Rating |
|---|---|
| Rotten Tomatoes (Average Score) | 8.61 |
| Rotten Tomatoes (Tomatometer) | 89% |
Review scores
| Source | Rating |
| The A.V. Club | A− |
| Paste Magazine | 9.0 |
| SFX Magazine | 5/5 stars |
| TV Fanatic | 4.5/5 stars |
| IndieWire | A+ |
| IGN | 8.9 |
| New York Magazine | 4/5 stars |
| Daily Telegraph | 4/5 stars |
| Radio Times | 5/5 stars |

"The Witch's Familiar" received critical acclaim, particularly praise of Michelle Gomez's performance as Missy and the interaction between the Doctor and Davros. The episode received a score of 89% on Rotten Tomatoes based on 17 reviews, with an average score of 8.6. The site's consensus reads "'The Witch's Familiar' is proof that Doctor Who is back on target, ending the two-part season opener with a revealing, meaningful, and twist-driven conclusion".

Patrick Mulkern, writing for the Radio Times, called it a "shining example" of the series, praising it as "underpinned by emotional intelligence" and noting the "excellent" performances of the four leads in "protracted dialogue scenes that test their mettle and demand audience attention", awarding the episode a full five stars out of five. Michael Hogan of The Daily Telegraph also enjoyed the episode, awarding it four stars out of five, commenting "plenty of twists and a brilliant Missy made for a very fun episode". In particular, he praised Michelle Gomez's performance – "[she] continued to excel as Missy, whirling around dementedly while chewing on dialogue with real relish", and closed his review by summarising that "it packed more ideas into 50 minutes than most shows manage in an entire series".

Scott Collura of IGN also lavished praise on the episode, awarding it a score of 8.9, deemed "great". To him, while the episode "had the deck stacked against it", it succeeded and was "exciting and touching". He praised Missy as a character and her interaction with Clara within the Dalek as "amusing", though "actually quite dark", in addition to acclaiming the dialogue between the Doctor and Davros. Alasdair Wilkins of The A.V. Club responded very positively to the episode, awarding it an A− grade. He especially praised the Doctor and Davros' exchange, finding it "by far the best use the TV series has made of the [latter] character since Genesis Of The Daleks". He also believed having Davros open his eyes "a particularly brilliant touch" and went on to praise the moment as "insightfully written, beautifully shot, and brilliantly acted".
