= World Theatre (TV series) =

Television series

- Genre: Drama, Anthology
- Based on: Stage Plays
- Written by: William Shakespeare, Georg Büchner, James Maxwell, Federico García Lorca, Ben Jonson, Donald Wolfit
- Directed by: Stuart Burge, James Maxwell, Rudolph Cartier, Michael Elliott
- Starring: Olive McFarland; John Southworth; Dilys Hamlett; James Maxwell; Patrick Wymark; Peter Sallis; John Moffatt; Madge Brindley; John Wentworth; Fulton Mackay; Esmond Knight; June Bailey; Anita Giorgi; Harald Jensen
- Composers: Paul Dessau, George Hall
- Country of origin: England
- No. of series: 1
- No. of episodes: 8 (2 missing)

Production
- Production location: England
- Running time: 105, 95, 90 minutes
- Production company: BBC

Original release
- Network: BBC Television
- Release: 5 May – 11 August 1959

World Theatre is a 1959 Drama play series featuring various plays adapted for television. The series was produced by the BBC and broadcast on BBC Television from 5 May 1959 - 11 August 1959.

== Plot summary ==
World Theatre features stage plays adapted for television.

== Cast ==
- Olive McFarland as Kattrin, Gerd
- John Southworth as Androgyno, Bethold
- Dilys Hamlett as Julie, Agnes
- James Maxwell as Camille Desmoulins, Ejnar
- Patrick Wymark as Danton, Mayor
- Peter Sallis as Barere, Simon, Prisoner, Doctor, Provost
- John Moffatt as Casca, Joseph Surface
- Madge Brindley as Citizen, Old Neighbour
- John Wentworth as Metellus Cimber, Sir Politick would-be
- Fulton Mackay as Lacroix, Villager
- Esmond Knight as Corvino, John Barthwick, MP
- June Bailey as Aurore, Former Countess, Woman from the Headland
- Anita Giorgi as Rosalie, Gypsy Women
- Harald Jensen as National Convention President, Young Gentlemen, Villager
- Roy Spence as Soldier, Villager
- Neil Robinson as Man, Servant to Joseph Surface
- Allan McClelland as Moon, Old Peasant's Son
- Colin Jeavons as St. Just, Executioner, Jack Barthwick
- Leonard Cracknell as Lucius, Man
- Rowena Torrance as Wedding Guest, Wheeler

== Episodes ==
The series ran for 8 episodes over one series that aired on Tuesdays. The episodes "Danton's Death" and "Blood Wedding" no longer exist in the BBC Archives and are believed now to be lost.

Ep	Title	Writer	Director	Original airdate	Archive
1	'Julius Caesar'	William Shakespeare	Stuart Burge	5 May 1959	Survives
Ep	Title	Writer	Director	Original airdate	Archive
2	'Danton's Death'	Georg Büchner, James Maxwell		19 May 1959	Missing
Ep	Title	Writer	Director	Original airdate	Archive
3	'Blood Wedding'	Federico García Lorca		2 June 1959	Missing
Ep	Title	Writer	Director	Original airdate	Archive
4	'Volpone'	Ben Jonson, Donald Wolfit		16 June 1959	Survives
Ep	Title	Writer	Director	Original airdate	Archive
5	'Mother Courage and Her Children'	Eric Bentley, Bertolt Brecht, Eric Crozier	Rudolph Cartier	30 June 1959	Survives
Ep	Title	Writer	Director	Original airdate	Archive
6	'Henry IV'	Luigi Pirandello		14 July 1959	Survives
Ep	Title	Writer	Director	Original airdate	Archive
7	'The School for Scandal'	Richard Brinsley Sheridan		28 July 1959	Survives
Ep	Title	Writer	Director	Original airdate	Archive
8	'Brand'	Henrik Ibsen, Michael Meyer	Michael Elliott	11 August 1959	Survives

== Production ==
During the filming of the episode "Brand" the production of the play was staged with impressively bleak and vast mountain sets designed by Richard Negri and required really highly complex lighting for the different open air conditions for the specified sets for the play, including the sea storm and avalanche. Patrick McGoohan who played the titled main character in the play it was apparently a very difficult role for Patrick McGoohan to successfully realise mainly due to his character that he was playing being a man who is presented in a state of heightened religious fervour from the first scene of the play when he appears on an arduous mountain pilgrimage. Meyer described the final act of the play leading up towards the avalanche, as being a great theatrical experience. He also said Ibsen was a master of the final act, but he never wrote a greater one than in Brand. The play was also performed live on television at the Lyric Opera House Hammersmith.

== Critical reception ==
Critics and reviewers praised the naturalistic, conversational performances of Wymark and Peter Sallis in contrast to McGoohan's more stylised performance for the play Brand. Patrick McGoohan also won a BAFTA award for his performance in the episode "Brand".

== DVD release ==
The only episode that has been released on DVD is the episode "Brand", which was released by Network DVD on the 28 July 2003. The DVD also features an interview with Peter Sallis where he recalled about his experience in the episode "Brand". When the DVD was released Brian Watson largely approved of the DVD and described it as "This is one Hell of a play, and a must for Prisoner enthusiasts".

== See also ==
- 1959 in British television
