= Michael Meyer (translator) =

Norwegian writer and translator (1921–2000)

Michael Leverson Meyer (11 June 1921 – 3 August 2000) was an English translator, biographer, journalist and dramatist who specialised in Scandinavian literature.

== Early life ==
Meyer was born into a family of Jewish origin. His father Percy Barrington Meyer was a timber merchant. His mother Nora died of influenza in 1928. He was educated at Wellington College in Berkshire and Christ Church, Oxford, where he read English. Initially a conscientious objector during World War II, he served as a civilian with Britain's Bomber Command for three years. He was lecturer in English at Uppsala University in Sweden from 1947 to 1950, and learnt Swedish.

== Scandinavian literature ==
His first translation of a Swedish work was the novel The Long Ships by Frans G. Bengtsson (published by Collins) in 1954, leading BBC Radio to invite him to translate Henrik Ibsen's Little Eyolf, although his understanding of Norwegian was limited at the time of the commission. He was then asked by Caspar Wrede for English versions of the same dramatist's The Lady from the Sea and John Gabriel Borkman, which were first used for Wrede's television productions. Brand followed for Wrede's 59 Theatre Company which was directed by Michael Elliott. Meyer eventually translated all of Ibsen's 16 major plays, which overlapped with his 18 translations of August Strindberg's plays. His translations of Ibsen and Strindberg gained him an international reputation, with over a thousand productions staged around the world during his lifetime.

His three-volume biography of Ibsen was published in 1967 won the Whitbread Biography Award. Rolf Fjelde, reviewing the biography for The New York Times Book Review in 1971, described it as "the most complete Ibsen biography to date".

His biography of Strindberg was published in 1985, for which the Swedish Academy awarded him their Gold Medal, the first time it had been given to an Englishman. He did not publish a biography of Strindberg for many years because the prejudices Meyer most objected to in people "would be headed by racism, hysteria, self-pity, malice and vengefulness, and Strindberg possessed all these in full measure." He resolved "however miserable Strindberg made others, I would keep my antipathy to myself."

== Original writing and other activities ==
Meyer wrote one novel The End Of The Corridor and several original plays for stage and radio including The Ortolan produced in 1953 with Maggie Smith and in 1967 with Helen Mirren, Lunatic and Lover about Strindberg’s three lovers which won an Edinburgh Fringe First in 1978. Meeting in Rome was a fictional account of a meeting between Ibsen and Strindberg starring Kenneth Haigh produced for BBC Radio 4, and an adaptation of George Gissing’s The Odd Women was produced by Manchester's Royal Exchange theatre in 1992. His memoir Not Prince Hamlet published in 1989, was described by David Mamet as "Beautifully written, a delight to read", and by Simon Callow as "A very special perspective of theatre and literary life". The Sunday Times reviewer said Meyer was "one of the funniest men in London".

Meyer was a visiting professor at several American universities including UCLA and Dartmouth. He taught at Central School of Drama and was on the board of the London Academy of Music and Dramatic Art (LAMDA). He was appointed a fellow of the Royal Society of Literature in 1971 and Knight Commander of the Polar Star in Sweden in 1977.

Braham Murray wrote in Meyer's Guardian obituary that he was "the greatest translator of Ibsen and Strindberg into English there has ever been" even superior to William Archer.

== Private life ==
Meyer was unmarried. He had one daughter Nora born in 1968, with painter Maria Rossman. He was in a long term relationship with teacher Sibylle Höschele from 1972.

== Original works ==
- The End Of The Corridor, 1951
  - A novel based on his unhappy days at Wellington College.
- The Ortolan, 1951
  - His first play, produced by Caspar Wrede in 1953, with Maggie Smith in the lead, and again in 1965 by Braham Murray, with Helen Mirren.
- Lunatic And Lover, 1982
  - A play about Strindberg's private life.
- Summer In Gossensass
  - About Ibsen's late love.
- Meeting In Rome
  - Starred Kenneth Haigh, an account of a fictional meeting between Strindberg and Ibsen.

== Translations ==
Meyer translated 14 of Ibsen's 15 mature plays (with the exception of 1869's The League of Youth):

- The Pretenders (1863, translated 1964)
- Brand (1866, translated 1960)
- Peer Gynt (1867, translated 1963)
- Emperor and Galilean (1873, translated 1986)
- Pillars of Society (1877, translated 1963)
- A Doll's House (1879, translated 1965)
- Ghosts (1881, translated 1962)
- An Enemy of the People (1882, translated 1963)
- The Wild Duck (1884, translated 1962)
- Rosmersholm (1886, translated 1966)
- The Lady from the Sea (1888, translated 1960)
- Hedda Gabler (1890, translated 1962)
- The Master Builder (1892, translated 1961)
- Little Eyolf (1894, translated 1961)
- John Gabriel Borkman (1896, translated 1960)
- When We Dead Awaken (1899, translated 1960)
