= Michael Elliott (director) =

English theatre and TV director (1931–1984)

Michael Elliott OBE
- Born: 26 June 1931; St George Hanover Square, London, England
- Died: 30 May 1984 (aged 52); Manchester, England
- Education: Radley College; Keble College, Oxford
- Occupations: Theatre and television director
- Years active: 1954–1984
- Spouse: Rosalind Knight (m. 1959)
- Children: 2, including Marianne

Michael Elliott, OBE (26 June 1931 – 30 May 1984) was an English theatre and television director. He was a founding director of the Royal Exchange Theatre in Manchester.

== Early life and education ==
Elliott was born in London, England, son of Rev. Canon Wallace Harold Elliott (1884–1957), a Royal chaplain, writer, and broadcaster, and his wife Edith Plaistow Kilburn. He was educated at Radley College and Keble College, Oxford. While still at Oxford he met Caspar Wrede, the theatre director, with whom he was to work closely for the next three decades.

== Career ==
After leaving Oxford, Elliott assisted on a production of Edward II at the 1954 Edinburgh Festival Fringe directed by Wrede. Also in 1954 Elliott joined the BBC to direct plays for the drama department.

In 1959, Wrede founded the 59 Theatre Company, based at the Lyric Theatre (Hammersmith) with Elliott appointed assistant artistic director and, although short-lived, the company achieved considerable success with productions of Ibsen's Brand (Elliott's professional debut as a director) and Little Eyolf, plus Georg Büchner's Danton's Death. The two men supervised a season of plays at The Old Vic in 1961, this time with Elliott as artistic director and Wrede as his assistant. He directed As You Like It in Stratford for the RSC with Vanessa Redgrave, Peer Gynt for the Old Vic with Leo McKern and Miss Julie for the National Theatre with Albert Finney and Maggie Smith.

Elliott continued to work in television, often directing plays he had already produced in the theatre. These included Brand, As You Like It and Little Eyolf. He also worked for television in Norway and Sweden. He completed more than 50 productions in the UK, the last being King Lear (1983) with Laurence Olivier.

In 1967, Elliott and Wrede agreed to direct productions for Braham Murray's Century Theatre at Manchester University and in 1968 the three of them set up the 69 Theatre Company also at the University where they produced plays until 1972. Elliott's productions included J. M. Synge's The Playboy of the Western World with Tom Courtenay, an adaptation of Daniel Deronda by James Maxwell with Vanessa Redgrave and Ibsen's When We Dead Awaken with Wendy Hiller and Brian Cox. Based upon the success of this collaboration, the group started to look for a permanent theatre in Manchester and eventually a new theatre was built inside the disused Royal Exchange with Elliott as one of the founding artistic directors. He remained at the Royal Exchange until shortly before his death.

His long-term collaborator, the translator and playwright Michael Meyer, said of Elliott: "Michael combined technical mastery with a brilliant visual sense, the ability to penetrate to the heart of the most resistant text, and the gift of extracting the best from everyone he worked with".

== Personal life ==
Elliott married the actress Rosalind Knight in July 1959. They had two daughters: the theatre director Marianne Elliott and the actor and director Susannah Elliott-Knight. Elliott was awarded the OBE in 1979.

== Theatre productions ==
Elliott's productions include:

=== Royal Exchange ===
- Uncle Vanya by Anton Chekhov, with Alfred Burke, Eleanor Bron, Leo McKern and Albert Finney (1977)
- The Ordeal of Gilbert Pinfold by Ronald Harwood. World premiere with Michael Hordern (1977)
- Twelfth Night, with Tom Courtenay, John Church and Lindsay Duncan (1978)
- Crime and Punishment adapted by Paul Bailey, with Tom Courtenay and Leo McKern (1978)
- The Lady from the Sea by Ibsen, with Vanessa Redgrave (1978)
- The Family Reunion by T. S. Eliot, with Edward Fox, Avril Elgar and Joanna David. Afterwards it was performed in the Roundhouse, London (1979)
- The Dresser by Ronald Harwood. World premiere with Tom Courtenay and Freddie Jones. (1980)
- Philoctetes by Sophocles, with Espen Skjønberg, Robert Lindsay and James Maxwell
- After the Lions by Ronald Harwood, with Dorothy Tutin (1982)
- Moby Dick. World premiere adapted and directed by Michael Elliott, with Brian Cox (1984)

=== Other theatre ===
- Brand by Henrik Ibsen for the 59 Theatre Company at the Lyric Theatre (Hammersmith), with Patrick McGoohan, Dilys Hamlett and Patrick Wymark (1959)
- As You Like It for the Royal Shakespeare Company, with Vanessa Redgrave, Ian Bannen, Ian Richardson and Colin Blakely (1961)
- Two Stars for Comfort by John Mortimer at the Garrick Theatre, with Trevor Howard, Peter Sallis and Isobel Dean (1961)
- Peer Gynt by Henrik Ibsen at The Old Vic, with Leo McKern (1962)
- The Merchant of Venice at the Old Vic, with Lee Montague, Sheila Allen and Esmond Knight (1962)
- Measure for Measure at the Old Vic, with Lee Montague, Dilys Hamlett and James Maxwell (1963)
- Miss Julie by August Strindberg for the National Theatre, with Albert Finney and Maggie Smith (1965)
- The Playboy of the Western World by J. M. Synge for the Century Theatre, Manchester, with Tom Courtenay, Bridget Turner and Dilys Hamlett (1968)
- When We Dead Awaken by Henrik Ibsen for 69 Theatre, Manchester with Brian Cox and Wendy Hiller (1968)
- Daniel Deronda adapted by James Maxwell for 69 Theatre, Manchester, with Vanessa Redgrave, John Bennett and Rosalind Knight (1969)
- The Tempest for 69 Theatre, Manchester, with James Maxwell and Michael Feast (1969)
- Catch My Soul by Jack Good at the 69 Theatre Company, Manchester, with Jack Good, P. J. Proby and P. P. Arnold (1969)
- Catch My Soul by Jack Good, for 69 Theatre at the Prince of Wales Theatre, London, with Lance LeGault, Lon Satton and Sylvia McNeill (1971)
- The Family Reunion by T. S. Eliot, for 69 Theatre at the Royal Exchange, with Edward Fox (1973)
- The Cocktail Party by T. S. Eliot, for 69 Theatre at Manchester Cathedral, with Brian Cox (1975)

== Television ==
Television films and plays that Elliott directed include:

- View Friendship and Marriage by Evelyn Fraser for BBC Sunday Night Theatre, with Albert Finney and Avril Elgar (1958)
- Brand by Henrik Ibsen for the BBC, with Patrick McGoohan, Dilys Hamlett and Patrick Wymark (1959)
- The Cherry Orchard by Anton Chekhov with Peggy Ashcroft, John Gielgud, Dorothy Tutin and Judi Dench (1962)
- As You Like It for the BBC, with Vanessa Redgrave, Patrick Allen, Ian Richardson and Max Adrian (1963)
- Little Eyolf by Henrik Ibsen for the BBC, with Avril Elgar, Dilys Hamlett, James Maxwell (1963)
- The Crunch by Nigel Kneale for ATV with Harry Andrews (1964)
- The Glass Menagerie by Tennessee Williams for CBS television, with Shirley Booth, Pat Hingle, Hal Holbrook and Barbara Loden (1967)
- The Cocktail Party by T. S. Eliot for Norwegian television with Liv Ullmann (1967)
- The Year of the Sex Olympics by Nigel Kneale for the BBC with Brian Cox and Leonard Rossiter (fellow Royal Exchange artistic director, Braham Murray appeared in a supporting role) (1968)
- Ghosts by Henrik Ibsen for the BBC, with Celia Johnson, Tom Courtenay and Donald Wolfit (1968)
- When We Dead Awaken by Henrik Ibsen, with Brian Cox (1970)
- King Lear for Granada Television, with Laurence Olivier (1983)

== Bibliography ==
- The Royal Exchange Theatre Company Words & Pictures 1976–1998. The Royal Exchange Theatre Company Limited. 1998. ISBN 0-9512017-1-9.
- Murray, Braham (2007). The Worst It Can Be Is a Disaster. London: Methuen Drama. ISBN 978-0-7136-8490-2.
