= Caspar Wrede =

Finnish theatre and film director

Casper Wrede
- Born: Casper Gustaf Kenneth Wrede af Elimä; 8 February 1929; Viipuri, Finland
- Died: 25 September 1998 (aged 69); Helsinki, Finland
- Education: Old Vic Theatre School
- Occupations: Theatre and Film director
- Years active: 1951–1993
- Spouse(s): Dilys Hamlett (m. 1951; div. 1976) Karin Bang (m. 1982)
- Children: 1

Baron Casper Gustaf Kenneth Wrede af Elimä, known as Caspar Wrede (8 February 1929 – 25 September 1998), was a Finnish theatre and film director. He was long active in the English theatre, co-founding the Royal Exchange theatre company in Manchester.

== Life ==
Casper Wrede came from a noble Finnish family of Livonian origin, which owned large estates mainly in eastern Finland between the 17th and 19th centuries, and had been created barons in 1652 by Queen Christina. He was born in Viipuri, Finland, and was the nephew of actor Gerda Wrede. He was born into the noble Wrede family. He died in Helsinki, Finland, in 1998.

== Career ==
In 1951, he left Finland and enrolled at the Old Vic Theatre School in London run by the French director Michel Saint-Denis. He was much influenced by Saint-Denis and his ideas had a great effect on the theatre companies that Wrede helped establish. In 1956, he was involved with the setting up of the Piccolo Theatre company in Chorlton-cum-Hardy, Manchester (which only survived for a year) and in 1959 he founded the 59 Theatre Company, based at the Lyric Theatre (Hammersmith). Michael Elliott was appointed assistant artistic director and, although short-lived, the company achieved considerable success with productions of Brand, Little Eyolf and Danton's Death. During this time, Wrede also directed both the stage debut of Alun Owen's play The Rough and Ready Lot and its 1959 television adaptation. Wrede and Elliott ran a season of plays at the Old Vic in 1961.

At the same time as his theatre work in the fifties, he directed plays for television including episodes of ITV Television Playhouse and ITV Play of the Week. He also started to direct films which he continued to do through the sixties, including One Day in the Life of Ivan Denisovich (1970), a feature film adaptation of Aleksandr Solzhenitsyn's novel with Tom Courtenay in the lead.

In 1967, Wrede and Michael Elliott agreed to direct productions for Braham Murray’s Century Theatre at Manchester University and in1968 the three men set up the 69 Theatre Company also at the university where they produced plays until 1972. The group started to look for a permanent theatre in Manchester. They were joined by Richard Negri, a colleague and friend of Wrede's since the Old Vic School who was to design the new theatre, and the actor James Maxwell and in 1973 a temporary theatre, The Tent, was installed in the former Royal Exchange in Manchester. The success of The Tent led to the decision being taken to build the new theatre inside the Royal Exchange. Wrede directed one of the two opening productions in September 1976, The Prince of Homburg. He directed over 20 productions during the next 15 years, resigning from the company in 1990 and eventually returned to Finland with his second wife, Karen Bang, a friend since childhood.

== Theatre productions ==
His productions include:

=== The Royal Exchange ===
- The Prince of Homburg by Heinrich von Kleist with Tom Courtenay, James Maxwell and Christopher Gable (1976)
- A Family by Ronald Harwood. World premiere with Paul Scofield (1978)
- The Deep Man by Hugo von Hofmannsthal. British premiere with James Maxwell, Dilys Hamlett, Tessa Dahl and Claire Higgins (1979)
- The Cherry Orchard by Anton Chekhov with Peter Vaughan, Dilys Hamlett, James Maxwell, Gabrielle Drake and Robert Lindsay (1980)
- Rosmersholm by Henrik Ibsen with Christopher Gable and Espen Skjønberg (1981)
- The Misanthrope by Molière with Tom Courtenay, Amanda Boxer, Christopher Gable and Tim McInnerny (1981)
- The Round Dance by Arthur Schnitzler. British premiere with William Hope, Cindy O'Callaghan and Gabrielle Drake (1982)
- Hope Against Hope, adapted and directed by Casper Wrede with Avril Elgar, David Horovitch and Dilys Hamlett (1983)
- The Wild Duck by Henrik Ibsen with Ian McDiarmid and Espen Skjønberg (1983)
- Three Sisters by Anton Chekhov with Cheryl Prime, Emma Piper, Janet McTeer and Niamh Cusack (1985)
- The Act by Richard Langridge with David Horovitch, Jonathon Hackett and Rory Edwards (1986)
- Oedipus by Sophocles with David Threlfall, Eleanor Bron and Espen Skjønberg (1987)
- American Bagpipes by Iain Heggie. World premiere with Tom Mannion and Eliza Langland (1988)
- Arms and the Man by George Bernard Shaw with Catherine Russell (1989)
- Donny Boy by Robert Glendinning (TMA Award for best new play). World premiere with Stella McCusker and Patrick O’Kane (1990)

=== Other Theatre ===
- Danton's Death by Georg Büchner for the 59 Theatre Company (1959)
- The Creditors by August Strindberg for the 59 Theatre Company with Lyndon Brook, Michael Gough and Mai Zetterling (1959)
- The Rough and Ready Lot by Alun Owen for the 59 Theatre Company with Ronald Harwood, June Brown, Jack MacGowran, Patrick Allen, and Alan Dobie (1959)
- Little Eyolf by Henrik Ibsen for the 59 Theatre Company with James Maxwell and Dilys Hamlett (1960)
- Othello at the Old Vic Theatre with Leo McKern, Errol John and Adrienne Corri (1963)
- The Father by August Strindberg at the Piccadilly Theatre with Trevor Howard (1964)
- Hamlet for the 69 Theatre Company with Tom Courtenay, Dilys Hamlett and Anna Calder-Marshall (1968)

== Filmography ==
- Twelfth Night (1957 TV film)
- Private Potter (1962)
- The Barber of Stamford Hill (1962)
- One Day in the Life of Ivan Denisovich (1970)
- Ransom (1974 film featuring Sean Connery)

== Bibliography ==
- The Royal Exchange Theatre Company Words & Pictures 1976–1998. The Royal Exchange Theatre Company Limited. 1998. ISBN 0-9512017-1-9.
- Murray, Braham (2007). The Worst It Can Be Is a Disaster. London: Methuen Drama. ISBN 978-0-7136-8490-2.
