= Avril Elgar =

English actress (1932–2021)

- Born: Avril Elgar Williams; 1 April 1932; Halifax, West Riding of Yorkshire, England
- Died: 17 September 2021 (aged 89); Bristol, England
- Years active: 1958–2011
- Spouse: James Maxwell (m. 1952; died 1995)
- Children: 2

Avril Elgar Williams (1 April 1932 – 17 September 2021) was an English stage, radio and television actress.

== Early life and career ==
Avril Elgar Williams was born on 1 April 1932 at barracks in Halifax, West Riding of Yorkshire, England to John and Annie (née Rose) Williams. The family moved to Catterick, North Yorkshire and Royal Arsenal before Elgar's father was posted to India. They returned to Britain in 1945, where they settled in Penzance. She trained at the Old Vic Theatre School in London.

At the National Theatre, she appeared in productions of Victoria Benedictsson's The Enchantment, Pam Gems' Stanley, and Julian Mitchell's Half Life. She appeared in drama and comedy roles and in many series on British television including Dixon of Dock Green, Midsomer Murders and Tales of the Unexpected. She played Ethel Pumphrey, the sister of Mildred Roper in George and Mildred.

Her last stage appearance was as Maria in Andrew Hilton's revival of Uncle Vanya at the Bristol Old Vic in 2009.

== Personal life ==
She was married to the American actor-director James Maxwell, from 1952 until his death in 1995. Together they had two sons. Maxwell directed her in a production of The Corn is Green at Manchester's Royal Exchange Theatre. Elgar died in Bristol on 17 September 2021, aged 89.

== Filmography ==
=== Film ===
- Room at the Top (1959)
- Ladies Who Do (1963)
- Spring and Port Wine (1970)
- The Medusa Touch (1978)
- Betrayal (1983)
- Thirteen at Dinner (1985)
- Wilde (1997)

=== Television ===
- The Diary of a Nobody directed by Ken Russell (1964)
- Gideon's Way episode "The Firebug" (1965)
- Dixon of Dock Green episodes "The Root of all Evil" and "Slim Jim" (1965)
- Dixon of Dock Green episode "The Pact" (1966)
- Softly, Softly episode "All That Glitters" (1966)
- The Wednesday Play, Jonathan Miller's Alice in Wonderland playing the "peppercook" (1966)
- Boy meets Girl episode "There was I, waiting..." (1967)
- Z-Cars episode "A Little Bit of Respect" parts 1 and 2 (1967)
- Theatre 625 episode "To See How Far It Is", scripted by Alan Plater (1968)
- Callan episode "Land of Light and Peace" (1969)
- Detective episode "Hunt for the Peacock", Hugh Leonard dramatisation of H R F Keating novel (1969)
- Leon Garfield's Smith episodes "God Save the King!" and "The Black Angel" (1970)
- ITV Playhouse The Style of the Countess script Simon Gray, director Michael Apted (1970)
- Ryan International episode "The Muck Raker" (1970)
- Play for Today episode "I Can't See My Little Willie" (1970)
- Paul Temple episode "The Quick and the Dead" (1971)
- Public Eye episode "I Always Wanted a Swimming Pool" (1971)
- The Befrienders episode "A Case of No Resolution" (1972)
- Budgie second series (1972) as Mrs Silverstone
- Carrie's War (1974)
- Bedtime Stories episode "The Water Maiden" (1974)
- The Stars Look Down (1975)
- Headmaster TV series episode "First Day" (1977)
- Romance TV series episode "Moths" (1977)
- Rosie (1977–1979)
- George and Mildred (1976–1979), as Ethel Pumphrey, Mildred Roper's sister
- Shoestring episode "Looking for Mr. Wright" (1980)
- Tales of the Unexpected episode "Back for Christmas" (1980)
- Tales of the Unexpected episode "The Moles" (1982)
- Play for Today episode "Under the Skin" (1982)
- Objects of Affection (TV series) episode "Our Winnie" (1982)
- The Bank Manager's Wife TV play adapted from a novel by Valerie Kershaw (ITV Central) (1982)
- The Citadel (1983)
- Sakharov (1984)
- Minder series 6 episode "Give Us This Day Arthur Daley's Bread" (1985)
- Them and Us (TV series) episode "Flash-Point" (1985)
- A Taste for Death (miniseries) (1988)
- Campion episode "Police at the Funeral" parts 1 and 2 (1989)
- Poirot episode "The King of Clubs" (1989)
- Rides (1993)
- Catherine Cookson's The Glass Virgin miniseries (1995)
- Midsomer Murders episode "The Killings at Badgers Drift" (1997)
- Goodnight Mister Tom (1998)
- My Family episode "Tis Pity She's a Whore" (2001)
- Heartbeat episode "Dirty Len" (2002)
- Waking the Dead episode "Walking on Water" (2003)
- Casualty episode "Finding Faith" (2004)
- New Tricks episode (2004)
- Doctors episode "Pardon" (2004)
- Doctors episode "You'll Be a Man, My Son" (2008)

== Theatre ==
Her roles in the theatre include:

- Young Macduff and second witch, Macbeth at the Royal Court Theatre, London (1958)
- Norah, Epitaph for George Dillon by John Osborne and Anthony Creighton, directed by William Gaskill at the Royal Court Theatre, London (1958)
- Lucille, Danton's Death by George Buchner, directed by Casper Wrede for the 59 Theatre Company at the Lyric Theatre (Hammersmith) (1959)
- Asta, Little Eyolf by Henrik Ibsen, directed by Casper Wrede for the 59 Theatre Company at the Lyric Theatre (Hammersmith) (1960)
- The Blood of the Bambergs by John Osborne, directed by John Dexter at the Royal Court Theatre, London (1962)
- Under Plain Covers by John Osborne, directed by Jonathan Miller at the Royal Court Theatre, London (1962)
- Alice Maitland, The Voysey Inheritance by Harley Granville-Barker at the Royal Court Theatre, London (1966)
- Olga, The Three Sisters by Anton Chekov at the Royal Court Theatre, London (1967)
- Aase, Peer Gynt by Henrik Ibsen, directed by Michael Elliott for 69 Theatre at the University Theatre, Manchester (1970)
- Agatha, The Family Reunion by T S Eliot directed by Michael Elliott for 69 Theatre at the Royal Exchange (1973)
- Agatha, The Family Reunion by T S Eliot, directed by Michael Elliott at the Royal Exchange, Manchester (1979)
- Miss Moffatt, The Corn is Green by Emlyn Williams, directed by James Maxwell at the Royal Exchange, Manchester (1981)
- Hope Against Hope adapted and directed by Casper Wrede at the Royal Exchange, Manchester (1983)
- The Queen, Cymbeline at the Royal Exchange, Manchester (1984)
- Miss Havisham, Great Expectations adapted by James Maxwell at the Royal Exchange, Manchester (1985)
- Mrs Perkins, The Admirable Crichton by J M Barrie at the Royal Exchange, Manchester (1985)
- Linda, Death of a Salesman by Arthur Miller, directed by Greg Hersov at the Royal Exchange, Manchester (1985)
- Aglae, Court in the Act by Maurice Hennequin, British premiere directed by Braham Murray at the Royal Exchange, Manchester (1986)
- Wendy, Among Barbarians by Michael Wall, world premiere directed by James Maxwell at the Royal Exchange, Manchester (1989)
- Amanda Wingfield, The Glass Menagerie by Tennessee Williams, directed by Ian Hastings at the Royal Exchange, Manchester (1989)
- Mrs Bennett, Pride and Prejudice, world premiere adapted and directed by James Maxwell at the Royal Exchange, Manchester (1991)
- The Innocents by William Archibald, directed by Robert Delamere at the Greenwich Theatre, London. (1991)
- Lady Bracknell, The Importance of Being Earnest by Oscar Wilde, directed by James Maxwell at the Royal Exchange, Manchester (1994)
- Hedda Gabler by Henrik Ibsen, directed by Braham Murray at the Royal Exchange, Manchester (2001)
- Les Blancs by Lorraine Hansberry, directed by Greg Hersov and Marianne Elliott at the Royal Exchange, Manchester (2001)
- Richard III, directed by Michael Grandage at the Crucible Theatre, Sheffield (2002)
- Mrs Wilberforce, The Ladykillers adapted by Giles Croft, directed by Ben Crocker at the Northcott Theatre, Exeter (2005)
- The Concierge, The Enchantment by Victoria Benedictsson, directed by Paul Miller at the Royal National Theatre, London (2007)
- Maria, Uncle Vanya by Anton Chekhov, directed by Andrew Hilton for Shakespeare at the Tobacco Factory, Bristol Old Vic (2009)
