= Alfred Burke =

English actor (1918–2011)

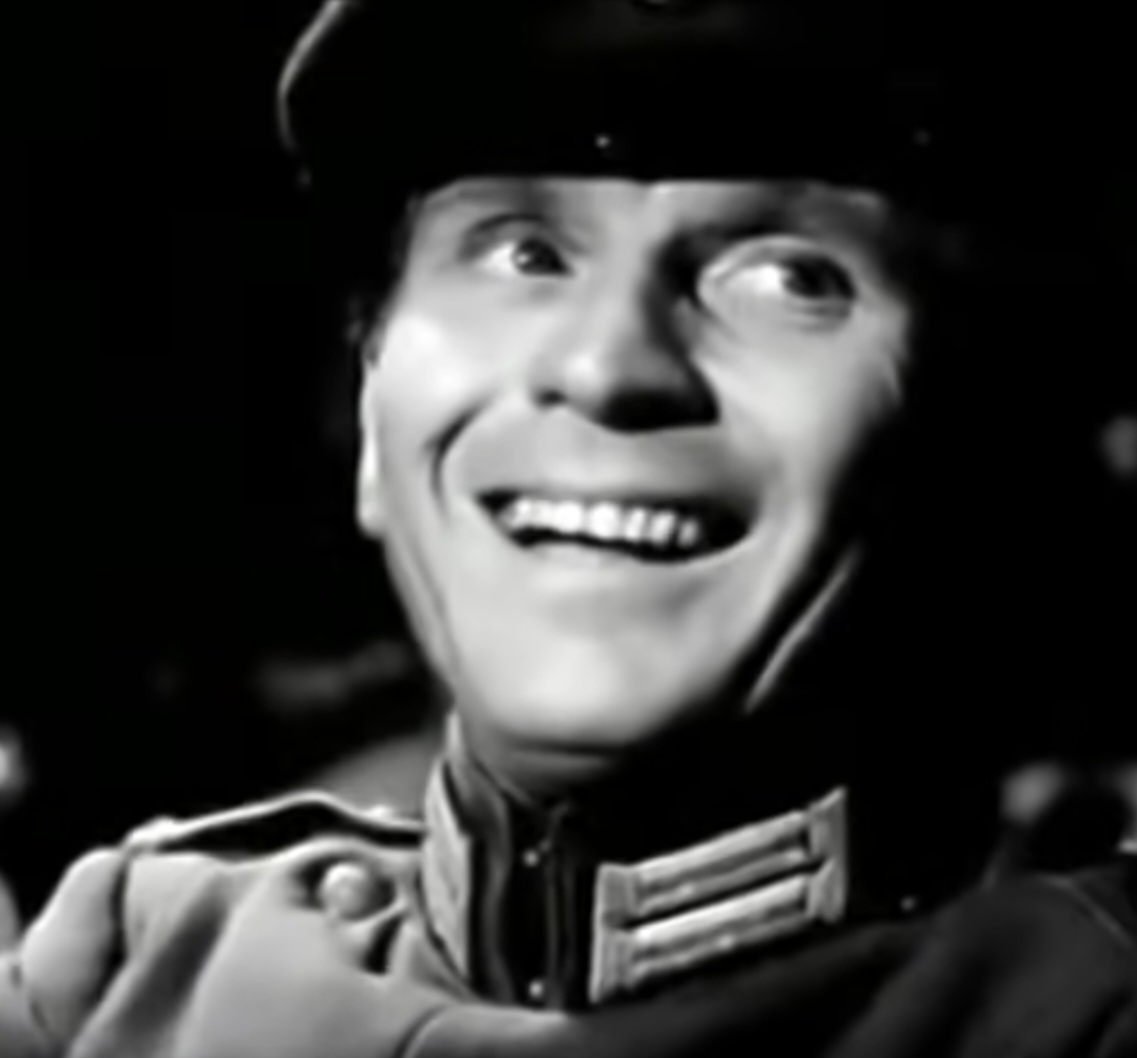
- Burke in the TV series One Step Beyond, episode The Sorcerer, 1961
- Born: 28 February 1918; Peckham, London, England
- Died: 16 February 2011 (aged 92); Barnes, London, England
- Occupation: Actor
- Years active: 1946–2003

Alfred Burke (28 February 1918 – 16 February 2011) was an English actor who played Frank Marker in the drama series Public Eye, which ran on television for ten years.

== Early life ==
Born in London's southeast district of Peckham, the son of Irish parents Sarah Ann O'Leary and William Burke, Burke was educated at Leo Street Boys' School and Walworth Central School. Burke started work aged 14, working in a railway repair firm in the City of London after leaving school. He became a club steward and also worked in a silk warehouse, joining a local amateur dramatics group before moving to Morley College and winning a scholarship to RADA in 1937.

Burke's acting career started two years later at the Barn Theatre in Shere, Surrey. His budding career was interrupted by the Second World War, when he registered as a conscientious objector, and was directed to work on the land.

== Career ==
In the late 1940s, Burke worked with the Young and Old Vic and other companies. His London debut was in 1950 at the Watergate Theatre, appearing in Pablo Picasso's play Desire Caught by the Tail. He then spent three years with Birmingham Repertory Theatre (1950–53) and appeared in the 1954 West End hit Sailor Beware!.

Burke built a solid reputation across a wide range of character roles in films and on television. His acting career included: The Angry Silence, Touch and Go, Interpol, Yangtse Incident and Buccaneers, as well as such televised plays as The Tip and Treasure Island.

Burke's most famous role was the enquiry agent Frank Marker in the ABC/Thames television series Public Eye, which ran from 1965 to 1975. His low-key, understated but always compelling portrayal of the down-at-heel private eye made the series one of the most popular and highly rated detective dramas on British television.

After Public Eye ended Burke appeared in a host of guises, from Long John Silver to Pope John Paul II's father. In the television series Minder he appeared in the episode Come in T-64, Your Time Is Ticking Away as Kevin, partner to Arthur Daley in his latest scheme, a minicab service. He was also the formidable headmaster "Thrasher" Harris in Home To Roost. He played Major (later Oberst) Richter in both series of Enemy at the Door and Dr Anderson in the Bergerac episode "Poison". Later he was seen as Armando Dippet in Harry Potter and the Chamber of Secrets.

On stage Burke appeared in several productions by the Royal Shakespeare Company, including Richard II, Romeo and Juliet, Roberto Zucco, The Tempest, Peer Gynt, Measure for Measure, Troilus and Cressida, Two Shakespearean Actors, All's Well That Ends Well and Antony and Cleopatra. In 2008 he appeared at the National Theatre as the Shepherd in a new version of Sophocles' Oedipus by Frank McGuinness.

In 2022 a documentary tribute to Burke was released entitled Alfred Burke is Frank Marker.

== Death ==
Burke died from a chest infection on 16 February 2011, twelve days before his 93rd birthday, and was cremated at Golders Green Crematorium. He was survived by his wife, Barbara (née Bonelle) and their four children: Jacob and Harriet (twins), and Kelly and Louisa (twins).

== Filmography ==
- The Kid from Brooklyn (1946) – dancer (uncredited)
- The Constant Husband (1955) – porter (uncredited)
- Touch and Go (1955) – man on the bridge
- Yangtse Incident: The Story of H.M.S. Amethyst (U.S. title Battle Hell) (1957) – Petty Officer
- Interpol (U.S. title Pickup Alley) (1957) – Vincent Cashling
- Let's Be Happy (1957) – French Ticket Clerk
- The Long Haul (1957) – drunk in club (uncredited)
- Bitter Victory (1957) – Lt. Colonel Callander
- High Flight (1957) – Controller, Operations Room
- No Time to Die (U.S. title Tank Force!) (1958) – Captain Ritter
- Law and Disorder (1958) – Willis Pugh, poacher
- The Man Inside (1958) – Mr Pritchard
- The Man Upstairs (1958) – Mr Barnes
- Operation Amsterdam (1959) – dealer
- Model for Murder (1959) – Podd
- The Crowning Touch (1959) – Reg
- Moment of Danger (a.k.a. Malaga) (1960) – Shapley
- The Angry Silence (1960) – Travers
- The Trials of Oscar Wilde (1960) – reporter
- Dead Lucky (1960) – Knocker Parsons
- The Pot Carriers (1962) – Lang
- Crooks Anonymous (1962) – Caulfield
- She Knows Y'Know (1962) – Mr Fox
- Mix Me a Person (1962) – Lumley
- On the Beat (1962) – Trigger O'Flynn
- The Small World of Sammy Lee (1963) – Big Eddie
- The Man Who Finally Died (1963) – Heinrich (uncredited)
- Farewell Performance (1963) – Marlon
- Children of the Damned (1964) – Colin Webster
- The Nanny (1965) – Dr Wills
- Night Caller from Outer Space (1965) (a.k.a. Blood Beast from Outer Space) – Detective Superintendent Hartley
- Guns in the Heather (1969) – Kersner
- One Day in the Life of Ivan Denisovich (1970) – Alyosha
- The House on Garibaldi Street (1979) – Adolf Eichmann
- A Midsummer Night's Dream (1996), filmed adaptation of the Royal Shakespeare Company's production – Egues
- Harry Potter and the Chamber of Secrets (2002) – Professor Armando Dippet (final film role)

== Television roles ==
=== Comedy ===
Year	Title	Role	Notes
1963	On the Knocker	Frank	
1985	Home to Roost	Thrasher Harris	Episode: "Bad Apples"
1994	Under the Hammer	Peter Pomfret	Episode: "The Fatal Attribution"

=== Documentary/Arts ===
Year	Title	Role	Notes
1974	2nd House	reader	"The First Freedom"
1977	The Lively Arts	reader	"Arnold Schoenberg: Bogey-Man - Prophet - Guardian 1: Crossing the Frontier 1874-1914", "Arnold Schoenberg : Bogey-Man - Prophet - Guardian 2: In Defence of Culture 1914-1951"
1978	The South Bank Show	reader	"Paganini Superstar"
1978	Vive a Venezia	reader	
1980	The Face Behind the Face (portrait of Dmitri Shostakovich)	reader	

=== Drama ===
Year	Title	Role	Notes
1951–1956	Sunday Night Theatre (a.k.a. BBC Sunday Night Theatre)	Various	6 episodes
1954	Murder Over Draughts		
1955–1956	Kathleen	Seamus MacGomigal	
1955–1959	ITV Television Playhouse (aka Television Playhouse)	Various	4 episodes
1955	The Adventures of Annabel	Neb	Episode: "Say It with Music"
1955	The Seventh Dungeon	Ranulf	
1956	Colonel March of Scotland Yard	Minister	Episode: "The Devil Sells His Soul"
1956	No Man's Land	Private Schultz	
1956	Theatre Royal (aka Lilli Palmer Theatre, or Lilli Palmer presents The Quality Theatre)	John	Episode: "Forecast Unsettled"
1956	London Playhouse	Constable Lo Peng	Episode: "The Black Judge"
1956	Without Love	Hart	
1956	The Bowl of Ramayama	The Vizier	
1956–1957	Assignment Foreign Legion	Major Lebeque / Corporal Lescaux	
1956–1958	The Adventures of Robin Hood	Will Sharpe/Sir Simon	2 episodes
1956–1964	ITV Play of the Week	Various	13 episodes
1957	Romantic Chapter	Philip	
1957	The Adventures of Aggie (U.S. title Aggie	Paddy O'Rourke	Episode; "Cock and Bull"`
1957	The Buccaneers	Pirate Mate/Marsh	2 episodes
1957	Hour of Mystery	Detective Sargeant Wilson	Episode: "Confess, Killer"
1957	Overseas Press Club – Exclusive!	Inspector Maron	Episode: "The Billion Franc Mystery "
1957	The New Adventures of Martin Kane	Greene	Episode: "The Taxi Story"
1958–1960	Boyd Q.C.	Prosecuting counsel	3 episodes
1958	You're a Long Time Dead	Harry	
1958	The Royalty	Sam	2 episodes
1958	Pringle	Mr Byward	
1958	The Adventures of William Tell	Bolf	Episode: "The Assassins"
1958	Murder Bag	Two appearances	Episode: "Lockhart Plays with Fire", "Case 27"
1958	Crime Sheet		Episode: "Lockhart Rings the Bell"
1958	Charlesworth	Stringer	Episode: "All That Glitters"
1958	International Detective	Mr Molinskys	Episode: "The Carrington Case"
1958	You Are There: The Ordeal of Christabel Pankhurst		
1959–1969	Armchair Theatre	Various	6 episodes
1959	The Invisible Man	Bob	Episode: "Point of Destruction"
1959	Probation Officer	Grantham	2 episodes
1959	Interpol Calling	Martin Becker	Episode: "The Angola Brights"
1960–1965	The Third Man	Inspector Dugaine	2 episodes
1960	ITV Sunday Night Drama	Clay	Episode: "Theatre 60: The Devil Makes Sunday"
1960	No Hiding Place	Alf Jenkins/Frank Baines	2 episodes
1960	Danger Man	Craven	Episode: "The Conspirators"
1961–1963	Edgar Wallace Mysteries (aka The Edgar Wallace Mystery Theatre)	Various	4 episodes
1961–1966	The Avengers	Various	3 episodes
1961	One Step Beyond (aka Alcoa Presents: One Step Beyond)	Scholl	Episode: "The Sorcerer"
1961	Ghost Squad	Kane	Episode: "Bullet with My Name on It"
1961	Top Secret	X	Episode: "X"
1961	Sir Francis Drake (aka The Adventures of Sir Francis Drake)	Sir Amyas Paulet	Episode: "Queen of Scots"
1962–1964	Z-Cars	Two appearances	"Day Trip" (1962) – Harold Singleton, "Whistle and Come Home" (1964) – Arnie Winter
1962	BBC Sunday Night Play	Zach Toombs	Episode: "The Day Before Atlanta"
1962	Man of the World	High Lama	Episode: "The Frontier"
1962	Maigret	Police Officer Lecoeur	Episode: "Seven Little Crosses"
1963–1964	The Saint	Jack Groom/Harry Shannet	2 episodes
1963	The Plane Makers	Len Gower	Episode: "One of Us"
1963	The Human Jungle	Sergeant Major Bennett	Episode: "A Friend of the Sergeant Major"
1963	The Odd Man	Brother Paul	Episode: "This Stuff's Thicker Than Water"
1963	Drama 61-67	Mr Foley	Episode: "Drama '63: Night of the Leopard"
1963	Zero One	Jenkins	Episode: "The Switch"
1963	Espionage	Gustave Kolstrom	Episode: "Covenant with Death"
1964	The Indian Tales of Rudyard Kipling	Naboth	Episode: "A Bank Fraud"
1965–1975	Public Eye	Frank Marker	
1965	Thirty-Minute Theatre	First Man	Episode: "That's Not My Name"
1966	The Plane Makers	Joe Panton	Episode: "The Switch"
1968	The Gamblers	Harry Jarman	Episode: "The Day the Banana Threw a Gorilla at Rachel"
1968	The Magical World of Disney	Kersner	Episode: "The Secret of Boyne Castle" (parts 1-3)
1969	Randall and Hopkirk (Deceased)	Henry Foster	Episode: "All Work and No Pay"
1969	As You Like It: An Introduction	Jacques	
1970–1972	ITV Sunday Night Theatre	Edgar/Leo Nottage	4 episodes
1970	Big Brother	Max Hughes	Episode: "A Little Bit Like a God"
1972	Love Story	Kapek	Episode: "Night of the Tanks"
1972	Crime of Passion	Paul Fayjac	Episode: "Paul"
1973	The Brontes of Haworth	The Reverend Patrick Brontë	
1973	The Power of Dawn	Leo Tolstoy	
1976	Jackanory	Storyteller	Episode: "Mr Moon's Last Case"
1976	The Lady of the Camellias	Monsieur Duval	2 episodes
1977	Centre Play	Snow	"The Tip"
1977	Treasure Island	Long John Silver	
1978–1980	Enemy at the Door	Major Dieter Richter	
1979	Minder	Kevin	Episode: "Come in T-64, Your Time Is Ticking Away"
1979	Orestia	Adolf Eichmann	
1979	The House on Garibaldi Street	Leader of the Old Men	Episode: "Agamemnon"
1980	ITV Playhouse	Harry	Episode: "A Rod of Iron"
1980	Tales of the Unexpected	Herbert	Episode: "The Flypaper"
1980	A Question of Guilt	Mr Blandy	6 Episodes
1981	The Borgias	Giuliano della Rovere	6 Episodes
1983	Number 10	First Earl of Chatham	Episode: "Bloodline"
1983	No Excuses	Max	3 episodes
1983	Shades of Darkness	Reverend Hibben	Episode: "Bewitched"
1983	Storyboard	Colonel Bressingham	Episode: "Inspector Ghote Moves In"
1984	Pope John Paul II	Karol Wojtyla Sr.	
1984	Kim	Lurgan	
1984	The Glory Boys	Jones	
1984	Unnatural Causes	Colonel Waley	Episode: "Ladies' Night"
1986	Bergerac	Dr Anderson	Episode: "Poison"
1988	Sophia and Constance	Mr Critchlow	5 episodes
1997	The Bill	Walter Lilly	Episode: "After All These Years"
2000	Longitude	Rear Admiral	
2002	Holby City	Derek Groombridge	Episode: "We Band of Brothers"

=== Selected radio appearances ===
Sources for this section include the BBC Archive.

Year	Title	Role	Notes
1951	Portrait of an Airman	Neri	BBC Third Programme
1962	Mr. Larkspur rings the Bell	Fred Baker	Afternoon Theatre, BBC Home Service
1975	Proms '75	Narrator	BBC Radio 3
1976	Murder International	Dr Lancret	"The Fall", BBC Radio 4
1976	Cardinal Richelieu	Cardinal Richelieu	Afternoon Theatre, BBC Radio 4
1977	Proms '77	Reader	BBC Radio 3
1977	In Rehearsal: Uncle Vanya	Astrov	BBC Radio 4
1977	Schoenberg	Reader	BBC Radio 3
1978	Call for the Dead	Mendel	Five episodes, BBC World Service
1979	Cirrhosis Park	Peter Hardinge	The Monday Play, BBC Radio 4
1980	The Sitting Tenant	Granger	Afternoon Theatre, BBC Radio 4
1980	Haydn Quartet / Schoenberg Trio	Introduction	BBC Radio 3
1980	Geometry	George	Afternoon Theatre, BBC Radio 4
1980	Certain Souvenirs	Narrator	Afternoon Theatre, BBC Radio 4
1982	Mainly for Pleasure	Introduction	BBC Radio 3
1982	Nothing To Declare	Peter Piper	BBC Radio 3
1983	A Small Apocalypse	The Writer	BBC Radio 3
1986	The Holy Experiment	Senor Querini	The Monday Play, BBC Radio 4
1986	La Peste	Fr Panaloux	BBC Radio 3
1986	All's Well That Ends Well	Lafew	BBC Radio 3
1986	Master Olof	Gert	BBC Radio 3
1987	Mr Beluncle		Three episodes, BBC Radio 4
1987	The Spy Who Came In from the Cold	Karden	BBC Radio 4
2003	The Six Mothers-In-Law Of Henry VIII	Chronicler	Six episodes, BBC Radio 4
2003	Nathan the Wise	The Patriarch	Drama on 3, BBC Radio 4

== Selected theatre roles ==
For a detailed list of Burke's many stage appearances 1947-2008 see his entry at Theatricalia.

- 1964: The pastor in The Father by August Strindberg. Directed by Caspar Wrede, Piccadilly Theatre, London.
- 1970: Henry in Henry IV by Luigi Pirandello. Directed by Bill Hays at the Leeds Playhouse (and later that year at the Edinburgh Festival).
- 1971: August Strindberg in Pictures in a Bath of Acid by Colin Wilson. Directed by Bill Hays at the Leeds Playhouse.
- 1977: Dr Rance in What the Butler Saw by Joe Orton. Directed by Braham Murray at the Royal Exchange, Manchester.
- 1977: Serebryakov in Uncle Vanya by Anton Chekhov. Directed by Michael Elliott at the Royal Exchange, Manchester.
- 1981: Vincentio in Measure for Measure. Directed by Braham Murray at the Royal Exchange, Manchester.
- 1985: Piotr Sorin in The Seagull by Anton Chekhov. Directed by Charles Sturridge at Queen's Theatre, London.
