= Dilys Hamlett =

British actress (1928–2002)

- Born: 31 March 1928; South Tidworth, Hampshire, England
- Died: 7 November 2002 (aged 74)
- Education: Old Vic Theatre School
- Occupation: Actor
- Years active: 1951–2001
- Spouse: Caspar Wrede (m. 1951; div. 1976)
- Children: 1

Dilys Hamlett (31 March 1928 in South Tidworth, Hampshire – 7 November 2002 in Cupar, Fife) was a British actress.

== Early life ==
Dilys Hamlett was born on 31 March 1928 in South Tidworth, Hampshire (now in Wiltshire), and developed an early interest in literature and theatre. She studied at the Old Vic Theatre School in the early 1950s and it was there that she met, and married, a fellow student, Caspar Wrede.

== Career ==
After leaving the theatre school she went immediately into the West End, appearing in The Innocents before performing in several productions for the Shakespeare Memorial Theatre Company. Although she continued to work in the West End and for theatres throughout Britain she was particularly associated with the group of directors, including her husband, Caspar Wrede, who eventually formed the Royal Exchange Company in Manchester. She worked for Michael Elliott in the 59 Theatre Company and then for Braham Murray in the Century Theatre in Manchester. These two companies led directly to the formation of the 69 Theatre Company and then to the Royal Exchange.

Though primarily known as a theatre actress she also directed a number of theatre productions and appeared in many television plays and films. She appeared as a storyteller on the BBC children's programme Jackanory, and narrated in twenty episodes between 1966 and 1967. Her film career included roles in Mix Me a Person (1962), Assault (1971), What Changed Charley Farthing? (1975), Diagnosis: Murder (1975), The Rainbow (1988), The Wolves of Willoughby Chase (1989), The Fool (1990), Harnessing Peacocks (1993), and Hollow Reed (1996).

Her theatre roles included

- Ophelia, Hamlet for the Royal Shakespeare Company, Stratford –upon-Avon (1956)
- Mariana, Measure for Measure for the Royal Shakespeare Company, Stratford –upon-Avon (1956)
- Julie, Danton's Death by George Buchner Directed by Casper Wrede for the 59 Theatre Company at The Lyric Theatre (Hammersmith) (1959)
- Agnes, Brand by Henrik Ibsen. Directed by Michael Elliott for the 59 Theatre Company at The Lyric Theatre (Hammersmith) (1959)
- Adela Quested, A Passage to India at the Oxford Playhouse (1960)
- Rita, Little Eyolf by Henrik Ibsen. Directed by Casper Wrede for the 59 Theatre Company (1960)
- Kate Keller, The Miracle Worker by William Gibson at the Old Vic (1962)
- Solveig, Peer Gynt by Henrik Ibsen. Directed by Michael Elliott at the Old Vic (1962)
- Isabella, Measure for Measure. Directed by Michael Elliott at the Old Vic (1963)
- Mary Tyrone, Long Day's Journey into Night by Eugene O'Neill. Directed by Braham Murray at the Century Theatre, Manchester (1965)
- Mary Louise, The Ortolan by Michael Meyer. Directed by Braham Murray at the Century Theatre, Manchester (1965)
- Portia, The Merchant of Venice. Directed by Braham Murray at the Century Theatre, Manchester (1967)
- Amanda, Private Lives by Noël Coward. Directed by Braham Murray at the Century Theatre, Manchester (1967)
- Widow Quinn, The Playboy of the Western World by J. M. Synge. Directed by Michael Elliott for the Century Theatre, Manchester (1968)
- Gertrude, Hamlet. Directed by Casper Wrede for the 69 Theatre Company (1968)
- Joan, The Trial of Joan of Arc by Gerard McLarnon. Directed by Braham Murray for the Century Theatre, Manchester (1969)
- Donna Lucia, Charley's Aunt at the Apollo Theatre 1971, London
- Donna Lucia, Charley's Aunt by Brandon Thomas Directed by Braham Murray at the 69 Theatre Company, Manchester (1972)
- Time and the Conways by J B Priestley. Directed by Braham Murray at the 69 Theatre Company, Manchester (1973)
- Rosalind, As You Like It at the Open Air Theatre, Regent's Park (1973)
- Catherine Petkoff, Arms and the Man by George Bernard Shaw at the Northcott Theatre, Exeter (1974)
- Vera, Pal Joey by Rodgers and Hart at the Northcott Theatre, Exeter (1974)
- Cleopatra, Antony and Cleopatra at the Northcott Theatre, Exeter (1976)
- The Norwegian Lady, The Ordeal of Gilbert Pinfold by Ronald Harwood. World premiere directed by Michael Elliott at the Royal Exchange, Manchester (1977)
- Paulina, The Winter's Tale at the Royal Exchange, Manchester (1978)
- Countess Freudenberg, The Deep Man by Hugo von Hofmannsthal. British premiere directed by Casper Wrede at the Royal Exchange, Manchester (1979)
- Lyuba, The Cherry Orchard by Anton Chekhov at the Royal Exchange, Manchester (1980)
- Mrs Clay, Blood, Black and Gold by Gerard McLarnon. World premiere directed by Braham Murray at the Royal Exchange, Manchester (1980)
- Adelaide Dupont, Have You Anything to Declare by Maurice Hennequin. British premiere directed by Braham Murray at the Royal Exchange, Manchester (1980)
- Akhmatova, Hope Against Hope adapted and directed by Casper Wrede at the Royal Exchange, Manchester (1983)
- Mary Cavan Tyrone, Long Day's Journey into Night by Eugene O'Neill at the Royal Exchange, Manchester (1985)
- Judith Bliss, Hay Fever by Noël Coward at the Royal Exchange, Manchester (1985)
- The Dowager Countess of Drumdurris, The Cabinet Minister by Arthur Wing Pinero at the Royal Exchange, Manchester (1988)
- Jeannie, Your Home in the West by Rod Wooden. World premiere directed by Braham Murray at the Royal Exchange, Manchester (1991)

== Personal life ==
She married Casper Wrede in 1951 in London. They had one son. They were divorced in 1976.

== Filmography ==
Year	Title	Role	Notes
1962	Mix Me a Person	Doris	
1962	The Barber of Stamford Hill	Mother	Uncredited
1971	Assault	Mrs. Sanford	
1975	What Changed Charley Farthing?	Miss Parchment	
1975	Diagnosis: Murder	Julia Hayward	
1989	The Wolves of Willoughby Chase	Aunt Jane	
1990	The Fool	Lady Emma	
1993	Harnessing Peacocks	Lucy Duff	
1996	Hollow Reed	School Nurse	

== Bibliography ==
- The Royal Exchange Theatre Company Words & Pictures 1976–1998. The Royal Exchange Theatre Company Limited. 1998. ISBN 0-9512017-1-9.
- Murray, Braham (2007). The Worst It Can Be Is a Disaster. London: Methuen Drama. ISBN 978-0-7136-8490-2.
