= When We Dead Awaken =

1899 play by Henrik Ibsen

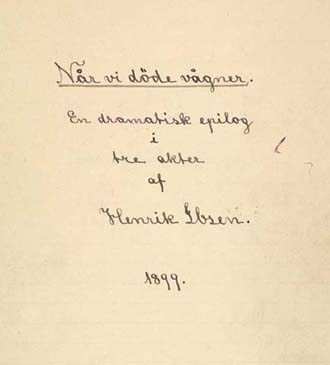
Title page

When We Dead Awaken (Norwegian: Når vi døde vågner) is the last play written by Norwegian dramatist Henrik Ibsen. Published in December 1899, Ibsen wrote the play between February and November of that year. The first performance was at the Haymarket Theatre in London, a day or two before publication and the currently only Broadway production was originally at the Knickerbocker Theatre from March 7 to 10, 1905, then moving to the Princess Theatre until it closed in April 1905.

== Plot summary ==
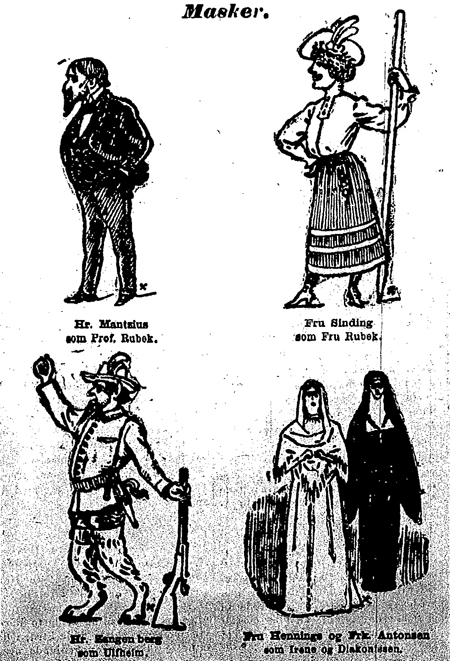
Ibsen's When We Dead Awaken character pictures

The first act takes place outside a spa overlooking a fjord. Sculptor Arnold Rubek and his wife Maia have just enjoyed breakfast and are reading newspapers and drinking champagne. They marvel at how quiet the spa is. Their conversation is lighthearted, but Arnold hints at a general unhappiness with his life. Maia also hints at disappointment. Arnold had promised to take her to a mountaintop to see the whole world as it is, but they have never done so.

The hotel manager passes by with some guests and inquires if the Rubeks need anything. During their encounter, a mysterious woman dressed in white passes by, followed closely by a nun in black. Arnold is drawn to her for some reason. The manager does not know much about her, and he tries to excuse himself before Squire Ulfheim can spot him. Unable to do so, Ulfheim corners him and requests breakfast for his hunting dogs. Spotting the Rubeks, he introduces himself and mocks their plans to take a cruise, insisting that the water is too contaminated by other people. He is stopping at the spa on his way to a mountain hunt for bears, and he insists that the couple should join him, as the mountains are unpolluted by people.

Maia takes Ulfheim up on his offer to watch his dogs eat breakfast, leaving Arnold alone with the mysterious woman. He quickly realizes that she is Irena, his former model. Irena constantly refers to herself as being 'dead'. During their conversation, she explains that posing for Arnold was akin to a kind of 'self murder', where he captured her soul and put it into his masterpiece, a sculpture called Resurrection. He confesses that he has never been the same since working with Irena. Though Resurrection brought him great fame and an abundance of other work, he feels a similar kind of death as Irena feels.

Irena mysteriously alludes to killing all of her lovers since posing for Arnold. She claims to always possess a knife, and also admits to murdering every child she has had, sometimes while they are still in the womb. When Irena asks where Arnold is going after his stay at the spa, she dismisses the idea of the cruise and asks him to meet her up in the high mountains. Maia returns with Ulfheim, asking Arnold if they can abandon the cruise and join Ulfheim on his mountain hunt. Arnold tells her that she is free to do so and says that he is thinking of going that way himself.

The second act takes place outside a health resort in the mountains. Maia finds Arnold beside a brook. She has spent the morning with Ulfheim. The couple return to their discussion of Arnold's unhappiness, and he confesses that he has grown tired of Maia. He wants to live with Irena because she had the key to the lock which holds his artistic inspiration. Their relationship was never sexual, because Arnold felt it would have ruined Resurrection. Maia is hurt but insists that Arnold should do as he pleases. She even suggests that perhaps the three of them could live together if she cannot find a new place to live.

Irena enters, and Maia urges Arnold to speak with her. The pair cast flower petals into the brook and reminisce sentimentally about their long-ago collaboration. At one point, Arnold refers to their 'episode', and Irena draws her knife, preparing to stab him in the back. When he turns around, she hides the knife. Arnold asks Irena to come live with him and work with him again, explaining that she can unlock his artistic vision once more. She insists that there is no way to resurrect a partnership like theirs, but they agree to pretend they can. Maia returns with Ulfheim, on their way to a hunt. She is happy and explains that she feels like she is finally awake. She sings a little song to herself, "I am free...No longer in prison, I'll be! I'm as free as a bird, I am free!"

The final act takes place on the rocky mountainside, with narrow paths and a shabby hunting hut. Maia and Ulfheim enter already in an argument over his sexual advances. Maia demands to be taken down to the resort. Ulfheim points out that the path is too difficult for her and she will surely die on her own. Arnold and Irena come up the path from the resort. Ulfheim is surprised that they have made it on their own, since the path is so difficult. He warns them that a storm is coming. Since he can only guide one person at a time, he agrees to take Maia down the path, and urges Irena and Arnold to take shelter in the hut until he can return with help.

Irena is horrified at being rescued. She is convinced that the nun will commit her to an asylum. She draws the knife again to kill herself. Arnold insists that she should not. Irena confesses that she almost killed him earlier, but she stopped because she realized he was already dead. She explains that the love that belongs to their earthly life is dead in both of them. However, Arnold points out that they are both still free, insisting that "we two dead things live life for once to the full". Irena agrees but urges that they must do it above the clouds of the gathering storm. They agree to climb the mountain so that they can be married by the sunlight. As they happily ascend out of view, Maia's song is heard in the distance. Suddenly, an avalanche roars down the mountain. Arnold and Irena can be seen carried to their deaths. The nun has followed Irena up the mountain and witnesses the horror with a scream. After a moment of silence, she says "Pax vobiscum!" (Peace be with you), as Maia's song still lingers in the air.

== Themes and style ==
The play is dominated by images of stone and petrification. The play charts a progression up into the mountains, and Rubek is a sculptor. One of Ibsen's most dreamlike plays, When We Dead Awaken is also one of his most despairing. "When we dead awaken," Irena explains, "we find that we have never lived." The play is suffused by an intense desire for life, but whether it can be achieved is left problematic, given the play's ironic conclusion (which is, incidentally, reminiscent of the first of Ibsen's two major verse dramas, Brand, and one of his last works in prose, The Master Builder).

Some authors argue that the dark romance in the play is based on Auguste Rodin's relationship with his student, co-worker, and lover Camille Claudel.

== History ==
Ibsen originally named the play The Resurrection Day, after Arnold Rubek's sculpture. Newly returned to Norway, after twenty-seven years abroad, he was thrilled to be back home. The Rubeks have also been traveling away from home for some time. Though he does not specify any location names in the play, Ibsen set the final two acts at Hardangervidda.

Ibsen could not decide on a surname for his leads, pivoting between Stubow and Rambow. In the first draft, the name became Stubek on the first few pages, until he finally settled on Rubek. Although Squire Ulfheim twice refers to his hunting servant directly by name as Lars, Lars is not listed in the cast of characters. The hotel manager initially had a name, Brager, and in the original, he is an Inspector, which also means 'overseer' in Norwegian. Ibsen refers to the nun as a 'Deaconess' in the original.

Part of Rubek's artistic death is what he considers hack work doing "portrait-busts". This is another reference to Ibsen's own life, as he considered many of his later plays to be 'portrait plays' (The Master Builder, Little Eyolf, John Gabriel Borkman), which simply recycled his central message. Furthermore, Rubek characterizes his early work with Irena as a form of 'poetry', with the implication being that his later, less significant works are prose. Ibsen felt similarly, wishing that he had continued writing poetry after Peer Gynt. Irena's outfit is also a reference to one worn by Laura Kieler in her last visit to Ibsen. The author was the basis for A Doll's House, and she resented Ibsen using her life in his work, just as Irena feels violated by Rubek.

The final scene was originally much different and more restrained. Ulfheim has a bottle of champagne atop the mountain, and all four characters drink a toast to freedom. When Ulfheim and Maia descend, Irena comments that "She has awakened from life's deep, heavy sleep". After disappearing into the mists on their way to the mountain top, there is no avalanche. The nun simply appears, looking for Irena, and the sun is seen gleaming high above the clouds.

James Joyce's first publication was a review of Ibsen's play.

== Adaptations ==
Three audio productions were broadcast on BBC Radio 3:

- 08 August 1969 translated by Michael Meyer and adapted by John Tydeman with Ralph Richardson as Rubek, Irene Worth as Irina and Barbara Jefford as Maia
- 28 April 1991 translated and adapted by Robert Ferguson with Paul Scofield as Rubek, Cheryl Campbell as Irene and Imogen Stubbs as Maia
- 31 March 2024 based on the Meyer translation adapted for radio by Ian McDiarmid starring McDiarmid as Rubek, Stella Gonet as Irina, and Melody Grove as Maja.

A television adaptation using the Meyer translation was broadcast on 12 February 1970 on BBC Two with Alexander Knox as Rubek, Wendy Hiller as Irene, Irene Hamilton as Maja and Brian Cox as Ulfhejm.
