= One Day in the Life of Ivan Denisovich (film) =

- American theatrical poster
- Directed by: Caspar Wrede
- Screenplay by: Ronald Harwood
- Based on: One Day in the Life of Ivan Denisovich by Aleksandr Solzhenitsyn
- Produced by: Caspar Wrede
- Starring: Tom Courtenay; Alfred Burke; James Maxwell; Eric Thompson
- Cinematography: Sven Nykvist
- Edited by: Thelma Connell
- Music by: Arne Nordheim
- Production companies: Group W Films; Leontes Films; Norsk Film A/S
- Distributed by: Kommunenes Filmcentral (Norway); Cinerama Releasing Corporation (UK and US)
- Release dates: 7 December 1970 (Sweden); 16 May 1971 (United States)
- Running time: 105 minutes
- Countries: United Kingdom; Norway; United States
- Language: English

One Day in the Life of Ivan Denisovich (Norwegian: En dag i Ivan Denisovitsj' liv) is a 1970 biographical drama film based on the novel by Aleksandr Solzhenitsyn with the same name.

== Plot ==
The film stars Tom Courtenay as the title character, a prisoner in the Soviet gulag system in the 1950s who endures a long prison sentence. It tells of a routine day in his life.

== Cast ==
- Tom Courtenay as Ivan Denisovich Shukhov
- Espen Skjønberg as Tiurin
- Alf Malland as Fetiukov
- Frimann Falck Clausen as Senka
- Jo Skønberg as Gopchik
- Odd Jan Sandsdalen as Eino
- Torstein Rustdal as Vaino
- James Maxwell as Captain
- Alfred Burke as Alyosha
- Eric Thompson as Tsetzar
- John Cording as Pavlo
- Matthew Guinness as Kilgas
- Roy Bjørnstad
- Paul Connell
- Sverre Hansen
- Wolfe Morris
- Kjell Stormoen
- Caspar Wrede

== Reception ==
Roger Greenspun, in a respectful but unenthusiastic review for The New York Times, spoke highly of the cinematography, the "intelligent exploitation of realistic locations," and "estimable performances" by Courtenay and Skjonberg, but said that the movie carries "the aura of an almost official view of high quality, as if this were how an important movie made from an important novel ought to look."

== Ban in Finland ==
Finnish film director Jörn Donner tried to get the film to Finland, but the Finnish Board of Film banned the showing of the film. In 1972, Donner complained to the Supreme Administrative Court of Finland. The Supreme Administrative Court voted for the banning 5–4 on 28 February 1972. In 1972 and 1974, Swedish television showed the film, and the Swedish Television mast in Åland was shut down during the movie to prevent Finns from seeing the film.

The director of the Finnish Board of Film, Jerker Eeriksson, said that the ban of the film was political because it harmed Finnish–Soviet relations. The director, Caspar Wrede, who then lived in England, refused to campaign against the ban to avoid bad publicity abroad.

The film was shown in Finland in 1993 and 1994 in the Orion movie theater in Helsinki, as well as in the cinema club in Vaasa. Finnish television showed the film in 1996 on the TV1 YLE channel.

== Bibliography ==
- Hellman, Ben; Rogachevskii, Andrei (2010). Filming the Unfilmable : Casper Wrede's "One day in the life of Ivan Denisovich". Stuttgart: Ibidem-Verlag. ISBN 9783838200446. Archived from the original on 2016-03-04.
