= Diagnosis: Murder (film) =

1975 film directed by Sidney Hayers

Diagnosis: Murder is a 1975 British film. It was directed by Sidney Hayers and co written by Ivan Goff, and was released on UK cinemas in July 1975.

== Plot ==
Christopher Lee plays a doctor, a sadist at heart who is tired of his profession. He is having an affair with his secretary and decides to do away with his wife. After drugging his wife and secluding her in an out-of-the-way country house, he gives the police a series of false leads about her disappearance, which point to him. This forces the police to search his home, his property and the lake on which he keeps his boat. He explains the logic to his secretary: “Once the police have completed their search, I’m in the clear. Then I can dispose of her in my own time. They never go over the same ground twice.” There is a subplot about the police investigator’s private life, and the story concludes with a twist ending.

== Cast ==
- Jon Finch - Inspector Lomax
- Judy Geeson - Helen
- Christopher Lee - Dr. Hayward
- Tony Beckley - Sergeant Greene
- Dilys Hamlett - Julia Hayward
- Jane Merrow - Mary Dawson
- Colin Jeavons - Bob Dawson
