= James Maxwell (actor) =

American-British actor, theatre director and writer (1929–1995)

- Maxwell in a 1965 episode of The Saint
- Born: James Ackley Maxwell; 23 March 1929; Worcester, Massachusetts, U.S.
- Died: 18 August 1995 (aged 66); London, England
- Years active: 1949–1992
- Spouse: Avril Elgar (m. 1952)
- Children: 2

James Maxwell (23 March 1929 – 18 August 1995) was an American-British actor, theatre director and writer, particularly associated with the Royal Exchange Theatre in Manchester.

== Early life ==
Maxwell was born in Worcester, Massachusetts, United States, but spent most of his career in the United Kingdom and died in London. He came to Britain at the age of 20 to train at the Old Vic Theatre School. While there he met fellow students Casper Wrede and Richard Negri (co-founders of the Royal Exchange 25 years later).

== Work in the theatre ==
After seasons at the Bristol Old Vic and the Piccolo Theatre in Manchester, Maxwell started to collaborate with the directors Michael Elliott and Casper Wrede, initially with the 59 Theatre Company. He translated Georg Büchner's Danton's Death (original title: Dantons Tod) for the opening production at the Lyric Theatre, Hammersmith. Elliott and Wrede went on to run the Old Vic company and Maxwell joined them to act in several of the productions including The Merchant of Venice and Measure for Measure.

The group then joined with Braham Murray in Manchester to form the 69 Theatre Company. Maxwell adapted Daniel Deronda; directed by Elliott and starring Vanessa Redgrave it was subsequently televised. He acted in many productions for the company including Prospero in The Tempest in 1969 and Thomas More in A Man for All Seasons in 1975. He also directed Arms and the Man with Tom Courtenay, Jenny Agutter and Brian Cox in 1973.

Based upon the success of this collaboration the group started to look for a permanent theatre in Manchester and eventually a new theatre was built inside the disused Royal Exchange with Maxwell as one of the founding artistic directors. He appeared in both the opening productions: Kleist's The Prince of Homburg (original title: Der Prinz von Homburg) and Sheridan's The Rivals and remained an artistic director until his death in 1995. As well as acting in many productions over the course of 20 years, he adapted several novels including The Count of Monte Cristo, Pride and Prejudice and The Moonstone. He also directed over 20 productions. As Braham Murray recalled. "As an artist he was multi-talented and practised each of his skills with discretion. As a writer, he translated many works; as a director he was particularly skillful at comedy. He loved to make people laugh, but it was as an actor that he would want to be remembered."

=== Theatre Productions at the Royal Exchange ===
The productions directed by Maxwell during his time as artistic director include:

- Present Laughter by Noël Coward with Albert Finney (1977)
- The Skin of Our Teeth by Thornton Wilder. Directed by Richard Negri and James Maxwell with Olive McFarland and Lee Montague (1977)
- The Schoolmistress by Arthur Wing Pinero with Patricia Routledge (1979)
- The Corn is Green by Emlyn Williams with Avril Elgar and Alan Parnaby (1981)
- Treasure Island adapted by James Maxwell with Clive Duncan and Ronald Forfar (1981)
- While the Sun Shines by Terence Ratigan with Paul Barber, Mick Ford and Caroline Goodall (1983)
- Hay Fever by Noël Coward with Richard McCabe, Dilys Hamlett and Marsha Hunt (1985)
- Zack by Harold Brighouse with Tim Healy and Bridget Turner (1986)
- Among Barbarians by Michael Wall. World premiere with Dominic Keating, Tariq Yunus and Avril Elgar (1989)
- She Stoops to Conquer by Oliver Goldsmith with Una Stubbs, Ewan Hooper, Andy Serkis and Lorraine Ashbourne (1990)
- Pride and Prejudice. World premiere adapted and directed by James Maxwell with Avril Elgar, Melanie Thaw, Rufus Sewell, Ben Daniels and Helen McCrory (1991)
- The Doctor's Dilemma by George Bernard Shaw with Jeremy Clyde, Trevor Baxter and Clive Owen (1991)
- Blithe Spirit by Noël Coward with Miranda Foster and Susie Blake (1991)
- Sidewalk Sidney by Rhandi McWilliams. World premiere with Eddie Osei and Charlie Caine (1992)
- An Ideal Husband by Oscar Wilde with Brenda Blethyn, Robert Glenister, Una Stubbs and Tom Chadbon (1992)
- The Moonstone. Adapted and directed by James Maxwell with Struan Rodger (1993)
- The Importance of Being Earnest by Oscar Wilde with Sam West, Neil Dudgeon and Avril Elgar (1994)
- The Count of Monte Cristo adapted by James Maxwell and Jonathon Hackett. World premiere directed by Braham Murray with David Threlfall and Colin Prockter (1994)
- Absurd Person Singular by Alan Ayckbourn with Trevor Cooper, Margo Gunn, Denys Hawthorne, Patrick O'Kane and Amanda Boxer (1994)

== Work in television and film ==
Although the theatre was always Maxwell's first love, he appeared in television and film. His best-known television role was as King Henry VII in both the 1969 TV movie Tower of London: The Innocent and the 1972 BBC2 drama series The Shadow of the Tower (which did not have the same level of success as The Six Wives of Henry VIII (1970), its predecessor drama). His other television credits include a prominent role in the Doctor Who story Underworld (1978). He appeared in The Avengers in the 1967 episode "The Superlative Seven" as Jason Wade, and also appeared as Osmond in a television serial of Henry James' The Portrait of a Lady (1968), Frontier (1968), Doomwatch: The Iron Doctor (1971),Thriller and The Saint. He played General-Major von Wittke in an episode of Enemy at the Door titled "Treason" (ep. 10, season 1, aired March 25, 1978).

He also appeared in the films Private Potter (1962), The Evil of Frankenstein (1964), Otley (1968) and One Day in the Life of Ivan Denisovich (1970). The first and last of these directed by his friend and colleague Casper Wrede.

== Personal life ==
Maxwell married the actress Avril Elgar in 1952 and the couple had two sons. They met at the Old Vic theatre school and she appeared in many of Maxwell's productions. He died in 1995.

Maxwell was referenced in the Royal Exchange Theatre, Manchester episode of Most Haunted (S8,07) when psychic medium David Wells allegedly received a message from Maxwell's spirit. His career was touched upon as a founding member of the theatre.

== Selected filmography ==
- Subway in the Sky (1959) – Officer
- Girl on Approval (1961) – John Howland
- Design for Loving (1962) – Joe
- The Traitors (1962) – Ray Ellis
- The Damned (1962) – Mr. Talbot
- Private Potter (1962) – Lt. Colonel Harry Gunyon
- The Third Secret (1964) – Mark
- The Evil of Frankenstein (1964) – Priest
- Far from the Madding Crowd (1967) – Doctor (uncredited)
- Otley (1969) – Rollo
- Connecting Rooms (1970) – Principal of Art College
- One Day in the Life of Ivan Denisovich (1970) – Captain
- Ransom (1974) – Bernhard
- Four Friends (1981) – Hippie
