= What Changed Charley Farthing? =

1974 film by Sidney Hayers

- Original British quad poster
- Directed by: Sidney Hayers
- Written by: David Pursall; Jack Seddon
- Based on: What Changed Charley Farthing? by John Harris
- Starring: Doug McClure; Lionel Jeffries; Hayley Mills
- Cinematography: Graham Edgar
- Edited by: Bernard Gribble
- Music by: Ángel Arteaga; Kenneth V. Jones (uncredited)
- Production company: Patuna Productions
- Distributed by: Fox-Rank
- Release date: 27 April 1975
- Running time: 109 minutes
- Countries: United Kingdom; Spain
- Language: English

What Changed Charley Farthing? (also known as The Bananas Boat), is a 1975 comedy film directed by Sidney Hayers, starring Doug McClure, Lionel Jeffries, and Hayley Mills. It was written by David Pursall and Jack Seddon based on the 1965 novel of the same title by John Harris (as Mark Hebden).

== Premise ==
Roaming sailor Charley Farthing is paid to give safe passage out of revolutionary Cuba to a young woman and her father.

== Cast ==
- Doug McClure as Charley Farthing
- Lionel Jeffries as Houlihan
- Hayley Mills as Jenny
- Warren Mitchell as MacGregor
- Dilys Hamlett as Miss Parchment
- Alberto de Mendoza as Jumbo
- Victor Israel as Christmas
- Fernando Sancho as Lupez
- Luis Marín as Hatta
- Ricardo Palacios as Greek captain

== Production ==
The film was shot at Pinewood Studios near London, and on location in Aguilas in Spain, which filled in for Havana. The film's sets were designed by the art directors Lionel Couch and Enrique Alarcón.

Finance came partly from the Rank Organisation.

== Release ==
What Changed Charley Farthing? was not released in the United States until January 1976.

== Critical reception ==
The Monthly Film Bulletin wrote: "this is a comedy: a fact signified by having the characters sit down on prickly cacti, drop heavy cases on each other's toes and – at various intervals amid the "hilarity" – scuttle around with uncovered, blushing buttocks. This dreary romp sadly misuses the comic potential of Lionel Jeffries and Warren Mitchell, recalls more successful Cold War comedies of the Sixties ("Cumbra" standing in for Cuba), and makes one wish Doug McClure (last seen in The Land that Time Forgot) would return to his TV Westerns."

TV Guide called the film "a total misfire."

The Spectator called it "a nice piece of slapstick".

Filmink called it "a painful attempt at an African Queen-type jaunt... with Mills attempting an odd accent and seeming unhappy."

Leslie Halliwell said: "Weirdly ineffective comedy actioner which never gets started and should never have been thought of."
