= Rose Tobias Shaw =

Polish-American casting director (1919–2015)

Rose Tobias Shaw (September 7, 1919 – October 27, 2015) was a Polish-American casting director.

== Early life ==
Born to a Polish Jewish family in Stuttgart, she left a shtetl near Łódź and immigrated as a child with her parents and sister, to The Bronx, New York. Initially embarking on a career as a dancer, she was engaged briefly to Broadway director and choreographer Jerome Robbins and later married Maxwell Shaw, an actor.

== Career ==
In New York City, Tobias worked as a fashion consultant for an advertising agency before joining CBS and then Talent Associates. Around 1961, she married the British actor Maxwell Shaw around 1961 after settling in the UK and then worked for Lew Grade's company. Her credits include the British televisions shows Danger Man (US: Secret Agent), The Prisoner and Man in a Suitcase. In 1969, The Times reported that Tobias Shaw had recently refused to become a producer because it would mean competing directly with men. "We are responsible to a man and I'd rather it were that way", she told a journalist from the newspaper and expressed a dislike of female bosses.

Her film credits include Madhouse (1974), The Seven-Per-Cent Solution (1976), Equus (1977), The Wild Geese (1978), Otto Preminger's last film, The Human Factor (1979), Lassiter (1984), The Jewel of the Nile (1985), The Last Temptation of Christ (1988) and Escape Victory (1981). During her career, Tobias Shaw was reportedly responsible for discovering Kim Novak, George C Scott, and Elliott Gould.

In the 1980s, Tobias Shaw became known as the "Queen of the Mini-series" for her casting of performers for television projects. Pierce Brosnan appeared on screen for about a minute in The Long Good Friday (1980), as a member of the IRA, but Tobias Shaw was able to assist Brosnan in gaining a significant role in the American mini-series Manions of America (1981) as a result.

Tobias Shaw received a BFI lifetime achievement award ("Career in the Industry") in 1987, and was described by the British Federation of Film Societies as a 'veteran of the business' and 'one of the best known casting directors'.
