= Sidney Hayers =

British film & TV director (1921–2000)

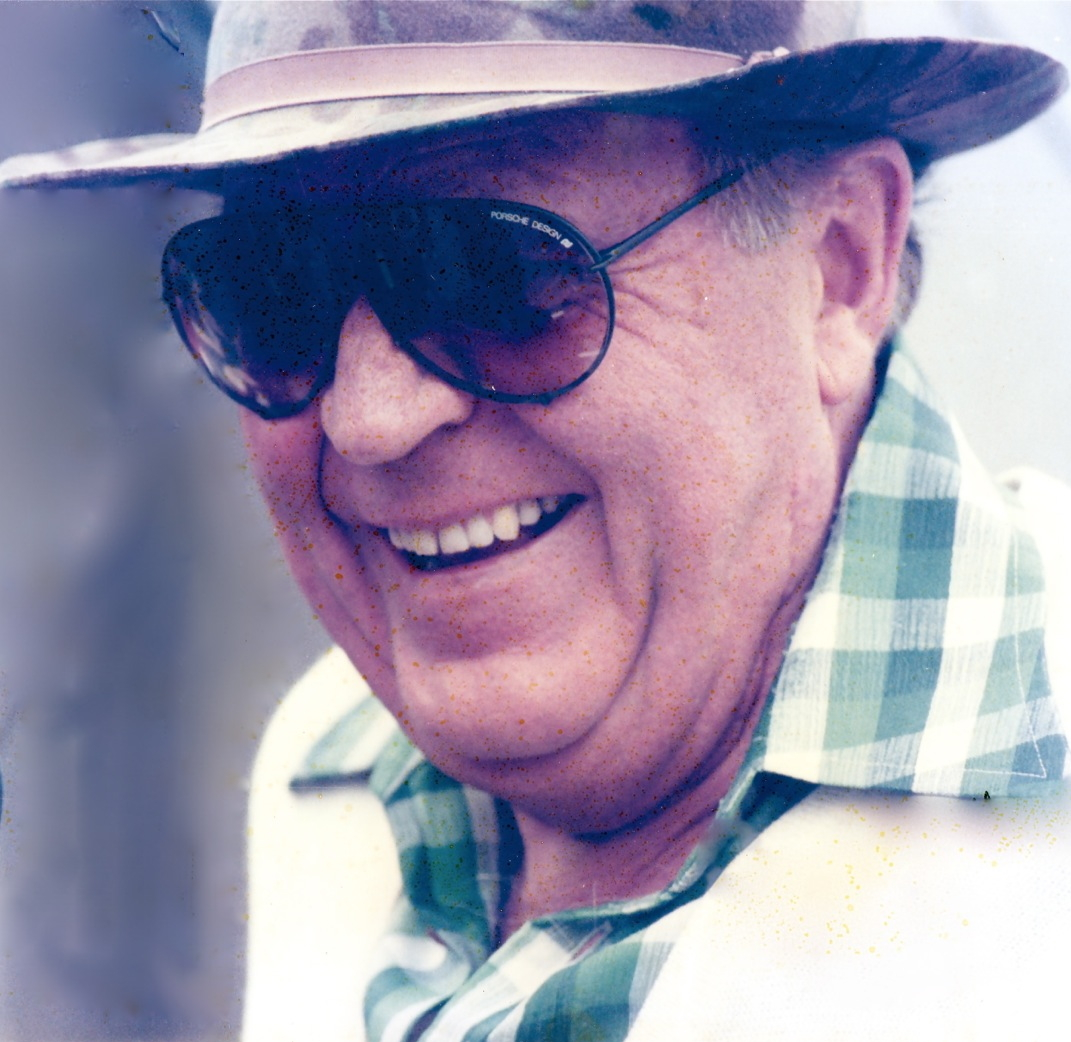
Hayers in 1990

Sidney Hayers (24 August 1921 – 8 February 2000) was a British film and television director, writer and producer. He has been called "perhaps the most under-rated British director of the 1960s."

== Biography ==
Born in Edinburgh, Scotland, Hayers began his career as a film editor. Among the films he directed are Circus of Horrors (1960), the occult thriller Night of the Eagle (1962), a musical Three Hats for Lisa (1965), and the adventure films The Southern Star (1969) and The Trap (1966). He made a British kitchen sink drama with This is My Street but it made little impact. Filmink magazine argued, "If you don’t think critics make a difference, just ask Sidney Hayers," comparing him with Clive Donner who also made a movie for the same studio, Nothing but the Best.. "Donner is no better director than Hayers, but he got the reviews [for Nothing But the Best] and was thus whisked off to Hollywood; Hayers toiled in B-land for the rest of his career."

In British TV, his credits included The Persuaders! and The New Avengers; he later directed several American TV shows, including episodes of Magnum, P.I., The A-Team, Knight Rider, T. J. Hooker, Baywatch and The Famous Five.

Hayers died of cancer in 2000 in Altea, Spain. His wife was the actress Erika Remberg. He had two children from his first marriage, to Patricia.

== Filmography ==
=== As writer ===
- Edith – original screenplay from researched notes.
- A Spy for a Spy – Screenplay adapted from the novel The Springers in collaboration with author Berkeley Mather.
- The Sweetwater Point Motel – Screenplay adapted from the novel of the same name by Peter Saab.
- The Tangled Web – Screenplay adapted fram the novel The Molester by Lee Sarokin.
- Spy Now, Pay Later – Original screenplay in collaboration with Carl Johnson and Karl-Heinz Willschrei.
- Blaues Blut (TV Series) – Additional material and rewrites for seven episodes.

=== As director/producer/editor ===
- While the Sun Shines (1947) – sound editor
- Warning to Wantons (1949) – editor
- Stop Press Girl (1949) – editor
- Prelude to Fame (1950) – editor
- White Corridors (1951) – editor
- Never Take No for an Answer (1951) a.k.a. The Small Miracle – editor
- Something Money Can't Buy (1952) – editor
- Deadly Nightshade (directed by John Gilling, 1953) – editor
- Recoil (directed by John Gilling, 1953) – editor
- Romeo and Juliet (1954) – editor
- Passage Home (directed by Roy Ward Baker, 1955) – editor
- A Town Like Alice (1956) – editor
- Triple Deception (1956) a.k.a. House of Secrets – editor
- High Tide at Noon (1957) – editor
- The One That Got Away (directed by Roy Ward Baker 1957) – editor
- A Night to Remember (directed by Roy Ward Baker, 1958) – 2nd Unit Director/Film Editor
- Tiger Bay (directed by J. Lee Thompson, 1959) – editor
- Violent Moment (1959) a.k.a. Rebound – director, editor
- Operation Amsterdam (directed by Michael McCarthy, 1959) – 2nd Unit Director
- The White Trap (1959) – director
- Circus of Horrors (1960) – Director, editor
- The Malpas Mystery (1960) – director
- Payroll (1961) a.k.a. I Promised to Pay – Director
- Echo of Barbara (1961) – director
- Night of the Eagle (US: Burn Witch Burn, 1962) – Director
- This Is My Street (1963) – Director
- The Human Jungle (1963–64) (TV series) - director
- Three Hats for Lisa (1965) (Musical) – Director
- The Trap (1966) – Director
- Finders Keepers (1966) – Director
- The Avengers (1965–67) (TV series) – director, 2nd unit director
- The Southern Star (1969) – Director
- Mister Jerico (1970) (TV) – Director
- Assault (1971) a.k.a. In the Devil's Garden – Director
- The Firechasers (1971) – Director
- Revenge (1971) a.k.a. Inn of the Frightened People – Director
- Shirley's World (1971) (TV series) – director
- The Persuaders! (1971–72) (TV series) – director
- All Coppers Are... (1972) – Director
- Arthur of the Britons (1972–73) (TV series) – director
- The Zoo Gang (1974) (TV series) – director
- Deadly Strangers (1974) – Co-Producer/Director
- What Changed Charley Farthing? (1974) a.k.a. The Bananas Boat – Co-Producer/Director
- Diagnosis: Murder (1975) – Co-Producer/Director
- One Away (1976) – Co-Producer/Director
- The New Avengers (1976–77) (TV series) - director
- A Bridge Too Far (directed by Richard Attenborough, 1977) – Director of action sequences
- The Professionals (1977–78) (TV series) – director, producer
- The Famous Five (1978–79) (TV series) – director, producer
- The Hardy Boys/Nancy Drew Mysteries (1979) (TV series) – director
- The Last Convertible (1979) (mini series) – director
- The Seekers (1979) (mini series) – Director
- Galactica 1980 (1980) (TV series) – director
- Condominium (1980) – Director
- The Misadventures of Sheriff Lobo (1981) (TV series) – director
- The Fall Guy (1981) (TV series) – director
- The Greatest American Hero (1981) (TV series) – director
- Magnum, P.I. (1981) (TV series) – director
- Terror at Alcatraz (1982) (TV movie) – director
- Knight Rider (1982–86) (TV series) – director
- Remington Steele (1982–83) (TV series) – director
- The Family Tree (1983) (TV series) – director
- Philip Marlowe, Private Eye (1983) (TV series) – director
- Manimal (1983) (TV series) – director
- Masquerade (1983–84) (TV series) – director
- The Master (1984) (TV series) – director
- T.J. Hooker (1984) (TV series) – director
- Cover Up (1984–85) (TV series) – director
- Hardcastle and McCormick (1985) (TV series) – director
- Airwolf (1985) (TV series) – director
- Hunter (1985) (TV series) – director
- The A-Team (1985–86) (TV series) – director
- Scarecrow and Mrs. King (1986–87) (TV series) – director
- Werewolf (1987) (TV series) – director
- Blue Blood (1988–89) (TV series) – director
- Dragnet (1990) (TV series) – director
- They Came from Outer Space (1990) (TV series) – director
- The New Adam-12 (1991) (TV series) – director
- Super Force (1991–92) (TV series) – director
- Tarzán (1992–95) (TV series) – director
- Baywatch (1993) (TV series) – director
- Acapulco H.E.A.T. (1993–94) (TV series) – director, writer
- Space Precinct (1994–95) (TV series) – director
- CI5: The New Professionals (1995) (TV series) – director
