= Maxwell Shaw =

British actor (1929–1985)

Publicity photo

Maxwell Shaw (21 February 1929 – 21 August 1985 in London, England) was an actor, known for The Barber of Stamford Hill (1962), Once More, with Feeling! (1960) and BBC Sunday-Night Theatre (1950). He is best remembered for his television work, but he also appeared in many feature films of the 1950s, 1960s, and early 1970s. He appeared as Mark 'Frisky' Lee in Gideon's Way (episode "Big Fish, Little Fish") (1964).

His Broadway credits include The Hostage. He had a small role in Ben-Hur (1959).

He was married to casting director Rose Tobias Shaw.

== Partial filmography ==
- 1956 David Copperfield - Uriah Heep
- 1958 No Time to Die - the Sheikh
- 1959 Ben-Hur - Galley slave (uncredited)
- 1960 Once More, with Feeling! - Jascha Gendel / Grisha Gendel
- 1962 Dr. No - communications operator (uncredited)
- 1962 The Barber of Stamford Hill - Dober
- 1962 Number Six - Luigi Pirani
- 1962 In Search of the Castaways - sailor
- 1964 The Saint: The Imprudent Politician - Spencer Vallance
- 1968 Nicholas Nickleby - Mr. Mantalini
- 1969 The Oblong Box - Hackett
- 1970-71 UFO - Dr. Schroeder
- 1971 Hine - Rashid (4 episodes)
- 1974 Father Brown: The Quick One - Ashley
- 1974 Special Branch: Intercept - Hodges
- 1975 Mister Quilp - Isaac List
- 1976 The Incredible Sarah - Fadinard
- 1976 The Sweeney: Sweet Smell of Succession - Colin Raleigh
