= The Barber of Stamford Hill =

1962 British film by Casper Wrede

- Opening titles
- Directed by: Casper Wrede
- Written by: Ronald Harwood
- Produced by: Ben Arbeid
- Starring: John Bennett, Megs Jenkins and Maxwell Shaw
- Cinematography: Arthur Lavis
- Edited by: Thelma Connell
- Music by: George Hall
- Production company: British Lion Films
- Release date: 1962
- Running time: 62 minutes
- Country: United Kingdom
- Language: English

The Barber of Stamford Hill is a 1962 British drama film directed by Casper Wrede and starring John Bennett. The screenplay was by Ronald Harwood, adapted from his 1960 television play of the same title. It was made at Shepperton Studios.

Mr Figg, a Jewish barber about to turn fifty, contemplates middle age and expresses regrets at never having started a family.

== Plot ==
The film opens in Mr Figg’s barbershop in Stamford Hill, in which he discusses his family life with his customers. Upon his arrival home, however, it is revealed that he is a bachelor and his stories of family life are inventions he concocts because he believes they are what his customers want to hear. In fact, he lives on his own in a flat in Stepney and on Friday nights he lights the Shabbat candles before his mute friend Dober comes to visit, and they spend the evening eating and playing chess.

As he sits with Dober, Mr Figg discusses his sadness about not having had a family and subsequently decides to propose to Mrs Werner, a widowed neighbour with two children. Leaving Dober in the flat, he visits her in the hope of doing so. However, as he sits in her kitchen, he is not only surprised by her admitting that she does not follow Jewish tradition by lighting the candles, but is unsure how to respond to domestic conflicts that take place between her and her children, as her son noisily plays the drums in the front room and her daughter argues with her about being allowed to go out. Before he can get round to proposing, Mrs Werner mentions that she recently received an offer of marriage from the local butcher, only to laugh the idea off as preposterous, leading Mr Figg to abandon his plan and return to his flat.

The film ends with Mr Figg back in his barbershop, chatting to a customer and relating the story of Mrs Werner’s son playing the drums as if it is a story about his own, fictional, family.

== Cast ==
- John Bennett as Mr Figg
- Megs Jenkins as Mrs Werner
- Maxwell Shaw as Dober
- Wensley Pithey as Mr O
- John Graham as Lister
- Trevor Peacock as Willy
- Eric Thompson as First customer
- Barry Keegan as Second customer
- Judi Bloom as Marilyn
- David Franks as Lennie

== Production ==
The film was adapted from a TV play made for ITV Television Playhouse in 1960 (series 5, episode 47), with Danny Green as Mr O. Both the play and the film were written by Ronald Harwood and directed by Caspar Wrede, but the only actor to appear in both was Maxwell Shaw as Dober.

== Reception ==
The Monthly Film Bulletin wrote: "Made on a small budget, this film retains the tight-knit qualities of its television original. The camera moves cautiously around three compact sets, and attention is focussed on the script. Happily, the script can take it. For the most part it consists of soliloquies, as the lonely barber admits his dreams of family life to the dumb piano-tuner. These are finally extinguished by Mrs Werner who, as she prattles on in her kitchen, builds up a contrary image of herself. The eternal feminine has a mind of her own. There is little music: tension is built up in silences, or to the sound of a knife chopping onions. Steady performances by Megs Jenkins and John Bennett in a story that quietly takes its time."
