= John Gabriel Borkman =

1896 play by Henrik Ibsen

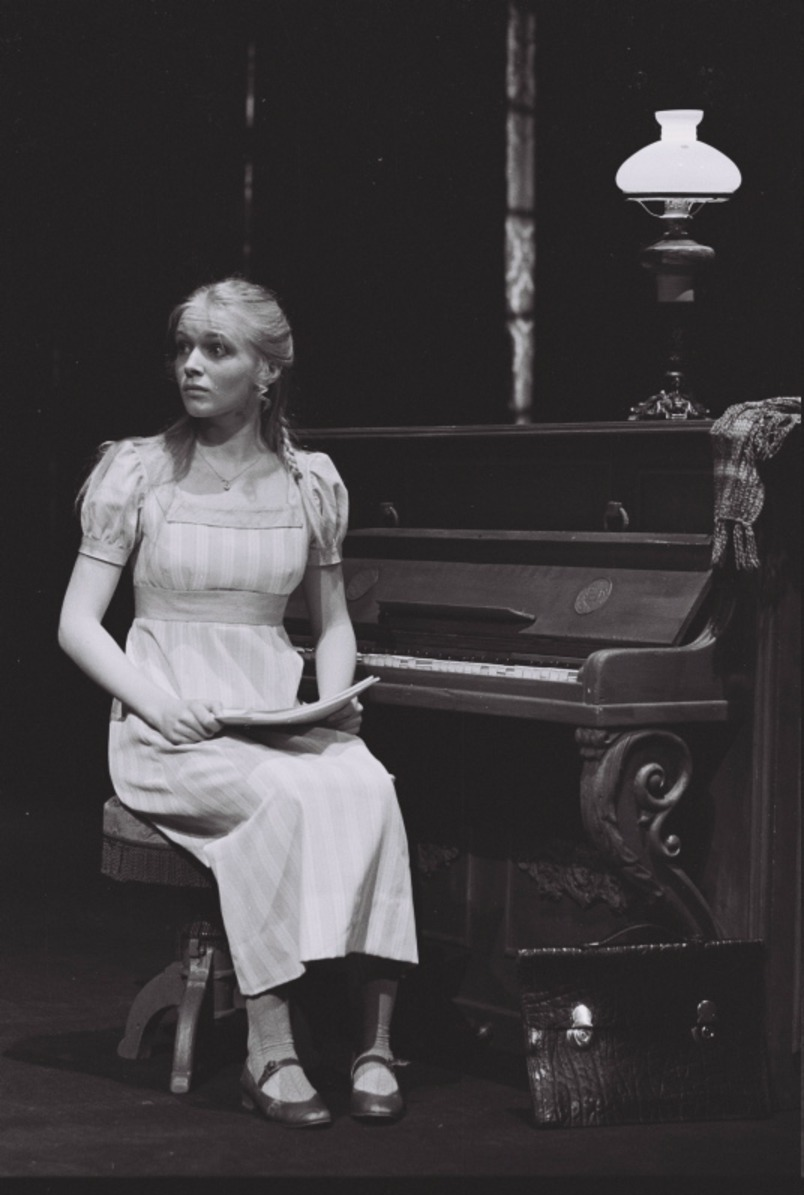
Norwegian actress Linn Stokke (born 1961) as Frida Foldal at the Nationaltheatret of Oslo in 1979

John Gabriel Borkman is an 1896 play by the Norwegian playwright Henrik Ibsen. It was his penultimate work.

== Plot ==
The Borkman family fortunes have been brought low by the imprisonment of John Gabriel who used his position as a bank manager to speculate with his investors' money. The action of the play takes place eight years after Borkman's release when John Gabriel Borkman, Mrs. Borkman, and her twin sister Ella Rentheim fight over young Erhart Borkman's future. Though John Gabriel Borkman continues the line of naturalism and social commentary that marks Ibsen's work over the preceding thirty years, the final act suggests a new phase for the playwright which was brought to fruition in his final symbolic work When We Dead Awaken.

== Characters ==
- John Gabriel Borkman
- Mrs. Gunhild Borkman
- Erhart Borkman, their son
- Ella Rentheim, Mrs. Borkman's twin sister
- Mrs. Fanny Wilton
- Vilhelm Foldal
- Frida Foldal, his daughter
- Malene, housekeeper

== Background ==
The Norwegian historian Halvdan Koht stated that the play could have been based on an incident that Ibsen might have recorded from an earlier period in his life around 1851, the attempted suicide of an army officer who had been accused of embezzlement.

== Revival ==
In 1925 Eva Le Gallienne produced, directed and performed in a successful run of the play in repertory with The Master Builder at the Princess Theatre, New York City. This was a critical step in her creation of the Civic Repertory Theatre in 1926.

In 2010, a revival of the play was performed in the Abbey Theatre as part of the Ulster Bank Dublin Theatre Festival. In a new version by Frank McGuinness directed by James Macdonald, it featured actor Alan Rickman as John Gabriel Borkman, Fiona Shaw as his wife Gunhild and Lindsay Duncan as Ella. The play had previously been performed in the Abbey Theatre in 1928. In 2011, the production moved to New York and received mixed reviews.

== Adaptations ==
In 2015, David Eldridge adapted the play into a two-part production directed by Helen Perry and broadcast on BBC Radio 4 on March 8 and 15, starring David Threlfall as Borkman, Susannah Harker as Ella Rentheim, Gillian Bevan as Mrs. Borkman, Philip Jackson as Vilhelm Foldal, Luke Newberry as Erhart Borkman.

In August 2017, as part of the Edinburgh Fringe Festival a new production in English based on a contemporary translation and adaptation by Fox and Orchid Theatre Company and played by just two actors portraying seven characters was performed. It was entitled "(My Father) John Gabriel Borkman".

In 2022 the play was performed in a new translation and updated to a more modern period at the Bridge Theatre, London, with Simon Russell Beale in the title role.

Ibsen was a critical figure in early modern Japanese drama, particularly the Shingeki movement, and Borkman was a particularly well received play with several contemporary translations, including by Mori Ōgai and Takuboku Ishikawa. The 1909 production of Borkman at Osanai Kaoru's Free Theater (Jiyū Gekijō) was staged in a way to re-contextualize the play to focus on the character of Erhart.
