= One Day in the Life of Ivan Denisovich =

1962 novella by Alexander Solzhenitsyn

- Author: Aleksandr Solzhenitsyn
- Original title: Один день Ивана Денисовича
- Translators: Ralph Parker (1963); Ron Hingley and Max Hayward (1963); Bela Von Block (1963); Thomas Whitney (1963); Gillon Aitken (1971); H.T. Willetts (1991)
- Language: Russian
- Genre: Historical Fiction; Prison Novel; Political Novel
- Publisher: Novy Mir; Signet Classic
- Publication date: 1962
- Publication place: Soviet Union
- ISBN: 0-451-52310-5
- OCLC: 29526909

One Day in the Life of Ivan Denisovich (Russian: Один день Ивана Денисовича, romanized: Odin den' Ivana Denisovicha, IPA: [ɐˈdʲin ˈdʲenʲ ɪˈvanə dʲɪˈnʲisəvʲɪtɕə]) is a short novel by the Russian writer and Nobel laureate Aleksandr Solzhenitsyn, first published in November 1962 in the Soviet literary magazine Novy Mir (New World). The story is set in a Soviet labor camp in the early 1950s and features the day of prisoner Ivan Denisovich Shukhov.

The book's publication was an extraordinary event in Soviet literary history, since never before had an account of Stalinist repressions been openly distributed in the Soviet Union. Novy Mir editor Aleksandr Tvardovsky wrote a short introduction for the issue entitled "Instead of a Foreword".

== Translations ==
At least six English translations have been made, the first five from the censored text as published in the Soviet Union. Of those, Ralph Parker's translation (New York: Dutton, 1963) was the first to be published, followed by Ronald Hingley and Max Hayward's (New York: Praeger, 1963), Bela Von Block's (New York: Lancer 1963), Thomas P. Whitney's (New York: Fawcett, 1963), and Gillon Aitken's (New York: Farrar Straus Giroux, 1971).

The sixth translation, by H.T. Willetts (New York: Noonday/Farrar Straus Giroux, 1991), is the only one that is based on the canonical Russian text and the only one authorized by Solzhenitsyn. The English spelling of some character names differs slightly among the translations.

== Plot ==
Ivan Denisovich Shukhov has been sentenced to a camp in the Soviet Gulag system. He was accused of becoming a spy after being captured briefly by the Germans as a prisoner of war during World War II. Although innocent, he is sentenced to ten years in a forced labor camp.

The day begins with Shukhov waking up feeling unwell. For arising late, he is forced to clean the guardhouse, but this is a comparatively minor punishment. When Shukhov is finally able to leave the guardhouse, he goes to the dispensary to report his illness. It is relatively late in the morning by this time, however, so the orderly is unable to exempt any more workers and Shukhov must work.

The rest of the novel deals mainly with Shukhov's squad (the 104th, which has 24 members), their allegiance to the squad leader, and the work that the prisoners (zeks) do in hopes of getting extra food for their performance. For example, they are seen working at a brutal construction site where the cold freezes the mortar used for bricklaying if not applied quickly enough. Solzhenitsyn also details the methods used by the prisoners to survive; the whole camp lives by the rule of day-to-day survival.

Tyurin, the foreman of gang 104, is strict but kind, and the squad's fondness for him becomes more evident as the book progresses. Though a serious man, he is liked because he understands the prisoners, talks to them, and helps them. In the book, Shukhov is described as one of the hardest workers in the squad, possessing skills that are in demand, and he has a generally positive perceptions. Rations are meager – prisoners only receive them on the basis of how productive their work units are (or how productive the authorities think they have been) – but they are one of the few things that Shukhov really appreciates. He conserves the food that he receives and is always watchful for any item that he can hide and trade for food at a later date, or for favors and services he can do for prisoners that they will thank him for in small gifts of food.

At the end of the day, Shukhov is able to provide a few special services for Tsezar (Caesar), an intellectual who does office work instead of manual labor. Tsezar is most notable, however, for receiving packages of food from his family. Shukhov is able to get a small share of Tsezar's packages by standing in lines for him. Shukhov reflects on his day, which was both productive and fortuitous for him. He did not get sick, his group had been assigned well-paid work, he had filched a second ration of food at lunch, and he had smuggled into camp a small piece of metal he would fashion into a useful tool.

== Main characters ==
The 104th is the labor-camp team to which protagonist Ivan Denisovich belongs. There are over 24 members, though the book describes the following characters the most thoroughly:

- Ivan Denisovich Shukhov (Иван Денисович Шухов), the protagonist of the novel. The reader is able to see Russian camp life through Shukhov's eyes, and information is given through his thoughts, feelings, and actions. Although the title refers to the main character by his given name, Ivan, and patronymic name, Denisovich (son of Denis), the character is primarily referred to by his surname, Shukhov.
- Alyoshka (Алёшка), a Baptist. He believes that being imprisoned is something that he has earned, since it allows him to reflect more on God and Jesus. Alyoshka, surprisingly, is able to hide part of a Bible in the barracks. Shukhov responds to his beliefs by saying that he believes in God but not heaven or hell, nor in spending much time on the issue.
- Gopchik (Гопчик), a young member of the squad who works hard and for whom Shukhov has fatherly feelings, as he reminds Shukhov of his dead son. Gopchik was imprisoned for taking food to Ukrainian ultranationalists. Shukhov believes that Gopchik has the knowledge and adjustment skills to advance far at the camp.
- Andrey Prokofyevich Tyurin (Андрей Прокофьевич Тюрин), the foreman/squad leader of the 104th. He has been in the camp for 19 years. Tyurin likes Shukhov and gives him some of the better jobs, but he is also subject to the camp hierarchy; Tyurin must argue for better jobs and wages from the camp officers in order to please the squad, who then must work hard in order to please the camp officers and get more rations.
- Fetyukov (Фетюков), a member of the squad who has thrown away all of his dignity. He is particularly seen as a lowlife by Shukhov and the other camp members. He shamelessly scrounges for bits of food and tobacco.
- Tsezar, or Caesar Markovich (Цезарь Маркович), an inmate who works in the camp office and has been given other special privileges; for example, his civilian fur hat was not confiscated by the Personal Property department. Tzesar is a film director who was imprisoned before he could finish his first feature film. Some discussions in the novel indicate that he holds formalist views in art, which were probably the reason for his imprisonment. A cultured man, Tzesar discusses film with Buynovsky. His somewhat higher class background assures him food parcels.
- Buynovsky (Буйновский) also called "The Captain", a former Soviet Naval captain and a relative newcomer to the camp. Buynovsky was imprisoned after he received a gift from an admiral on a British cruiser on which he had served as a naval liaison. In the camp, Buynovsky has not yet learned to be submissive before the wardens.
- Pavlo (Павло), a Ukrainian who serves as deputy foreman/squad leader and assists Tyurin in directing the 104th, especially when Tyurin is absent.
- Ivan Kilgas, or Janis Kildigs (Иван Кильдигс), the leading worker of the 104th squad along with Shukhov, a Latvian by birth. He speaks Russian like a native, having learned it in his childhood. Kilgas is popular with the team for making jokes.
- Senka Klevshin (Сенька Клевшин), a member of the 104th who became deaf from intense fighting during World War II. He escaped from the Germans three times and was recaptured each time, ending up in the Buchenwald concentration camp.

== History ==
One Day is a sparse, tersely written narrative of a single day of the ten-year labor camp imprisonment of a fictitious Soviet prisoner, Ivan Denisovich Shukhov. Aleksandr Solzhenitsyn had first-hand experience in the Gulag system, having been imprisoned from 1945 to 1953 for writing derogatory comments in letters to friends about the conduct of the war by Joseph Stalin, whom he referred to by epithets such as "the master" and "the boss". Drafts of stories found in Solzhenitsyn's map case had been used to incriminate him (Frangsmyr, 1993). Solzhenitsyn claimed the prisoners wept when news of Stalin's death reached them. He uses the epithet batka usaty (батька усатый) in his novel, which translates to "Old Whiskers" or "Old Man Whiskers". This title was considered offensive and derogatory, but prisoners were free to call Stalin whatever they liked: "Somebody in the room was bellowing: 'Old Man Whiskers won't ever let you go! He wouldn't trust his own brother, let alone a bunch of cretins like you!"

In 1957, after being released from the exile that followed his imprisonment, Solzhenitsyn began writing One Day. In 1962, he submitted his manuscript to Novy Mir, a Russian literary magazine. The editor, Aleksandr Tvardovsky, was so impressed with the detailed description of life in the labor camps that he submitted the manuscript to the Communist Party Central Committee for approval to publish it—until then Soviet writers had not been allowed to refer to the camps. From there it was sent to the de-Stalinist Nikita Khrushchev, who, despite the objections of some top party members, ultimately authorized its publication with some censorship of the text. After the novel was sent to the editor, Aleksandr Tvardovsky of Novy Mir, it was published in November 1962.

The labor camp featured in the book was one at which Solzhenitsyn had served some time, and was located in Karaganda in northern Kazakhstan.

== Reception and influence ==
One Day was published in 1962 in Novy mir with the endorsement of CPSU First Secretary Nikita Khrushchev, who praised the novella at the Party plenum. In 1964, it was a candidate for the Lenin Prize and evoked heated debates among the prize committee, but ultimately failed to win the nomination. It evoked heated debates among the Soviet reading public, as well. As Miriam Dobson notes:

The Novyi mir mailbag contains letters from lawyers, teachers, party members, purge victims and their relatives, self-confessed thieves, prisoners, camp workers, pensioners, an army captain, a collective farmer, a worker in a chemical laboratory, and simply "young people." These letters reflect a broad spectrum of opinion. On the one hand, jubilant readers lavished praise on Solzhenitsyn, [Novy mir editor] Aleksandr Tvardovskii, and all that seemed to truly promise a "new world"; on the other hand, skeptical voices remained convinced that the camps had been populated by inveterate enemies of the Soviet people. Yet in the extant corpus of citizens' letters, such stark positions appear relatively rare.

Such open publicity was, however, short lived. In October 1964, Khrushchev was ousted and the themes of gulags was disallowed in the Soviet press. Solzhenitsyn's later novels were published abroad and circulated within the Soviet Union illegally. In 1969, Solzhenitsyn was expelled from the Soviet Writers' Union. In 1970, he was awarded the Nobel Prize for literature.

Solzhenitsyn was arrested, stripped of his Soviet citizenship, and exiled from the Soviet Union in 1974. Two days after his expulsion, Glavlit issued an order removing all his books from libraries' open stacks. Until Gorbachev's perestroika allowed their re-publication, they circulated only illegally, as samizdat. Vitaly Korotich, the perestroika-era editor of the magazine Ogoniok wrote: "The Soviet Union was destroyed by information – and this wave started from Solzhenitsyn's One Day".

== Film ==
A one-hour dramatization for television, made for NBC in 1963, starred Jason Robards Jr. in the title role and was broadcast on November 8, 1963. A 1970 film adaptation based on the novella starred British actor Tom Courtenay in the title role. Finland banned the film from public view, fearing that it could hurt external relations with its eastern neighbor.

== Sources ==
- Feuer, Kathryn (Ed). Solzhenitsyn: A collection of Critical Essays. (1976). Spectrum Books, ISBN 0-13-822619-9
- Moody, Christopher. Solzhenitsyn. (1973). Oliver and Boyd, Edinburgh ISBN 0-05-002600-3
- Labedz, Leopold. Solzhenitsyn: A documentary record. (1970). Penguin ISBN 0-14-003395-5
- Scammell, Michael. Solzhenitsyn. (1986). Paladin. ISBN 0-586-08538-6
- Solzhenitsyn, Aleksandr. Invisible Allies. (Translated by Alexis Klimoff and Michael Nicholson). (1995). The Harvill Press ISBN 1-86046-259-6
- Grazzini, Giovanni. Solzhenitsyn. (Translated by Eric Mosbacher) (1971). Michael Joseph, ISBN 0-7181-1068-4
- Burg, David; Feifer, George. Solzhenitsyn: A Biography. (1972). ISBN 0-340-16593-6
- Medvedev, Zhores. 10 Years After Ivan Denisovich. (1973). Knopf, ISBN 0394490266
- Rothberg, Abraham. Aleksandr Solzhenitsyn: The Major Novels. (1971). Cornell University Press. ISBN 0-8014-0668-4
- Klimoff, Alexis (1997). One Day in the Life of Ivan Denisovich: A Critical Companion. Evanston, Ill.: Northwestern University Press. ISBN 978-0-8101-1214-8. (preview)
- Salisbury, Harrison E. (January 22, 1963). "One Day in the Life of Ivan Denisovich (review)". New York Times.
- Solzhenitsyn, Aleksandr (1980). The Oak and the Calf: Sketches of Literary Life in the Soviet Union. Harry Willetts (trans.). New York: Harper & Row. ISBN 978-0-06-014014-4. In the early chapters, Solzhenitsyn describes how One Day came to be written and published.
- Nobel Lectures, Literature 1968-1980, Editor-in-Charge Tore Frängsmyr, Editor Sture Allén, World Scientific Publishing Co., Singapore, 1993.
- Solzhenitsyn, Aleksandr (1995). One Day in the Life of Ivan Denisovich. H. T. Willetts (trans.), John Bayley (intro.). New York: Knopf, Everyman's Library. ISBN 978-0-679-44464-0.
- Solzhenitsyn, Aleksandr (2000). One Day in the Life of Ivan Denisovich. Ralph Parker (trans. and intro.). Penguin Modern Classics. ISBN 978-0-14-118474-6.
