= Brand (play) =

19th-century theater work by Norwegian dramatist Henrik Ibsen

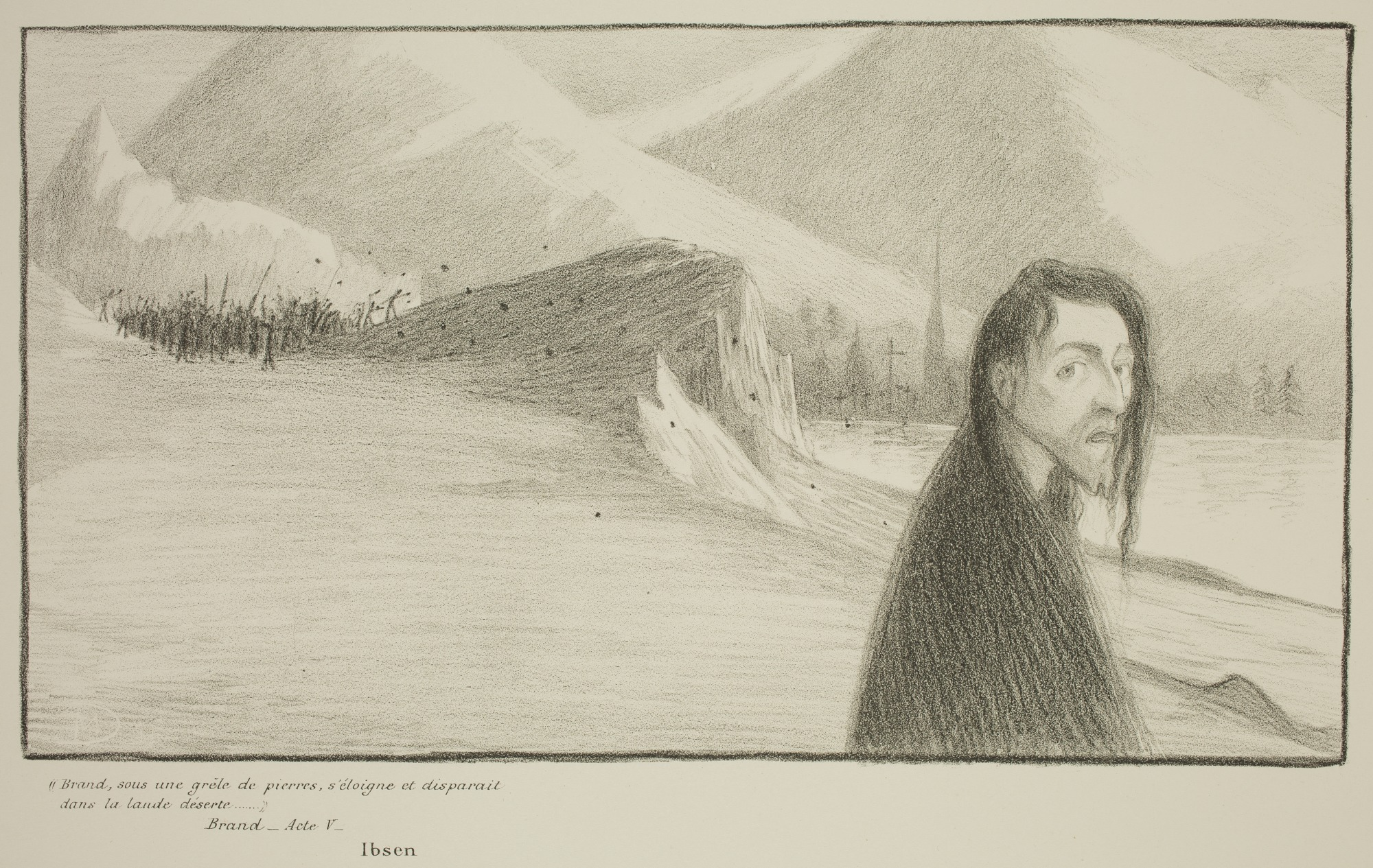
Lithograph by Maurice Dumont for a 1895 production of Brand at the Théâtre de l'Œuvre

Brand is a play by the Norwegian playwright Henrik Ibsen. It is a verse tragedy, written in 1865 and first performed in Stockholm, Sweden on 24 March 1867.

Brand is a priest who accepts the consequence of his choices, and is deeply bound to doing the "right thing". He believes primarily in the will of man, and lives by the belief "all or nothing". To make compromises is therefore difficult, or questionable. Brand's beliefs render him lonely, because those around him, when put to the test, generally cannot or will not follow his example. He is a young idealist whose main purpose is to save the world, or at least people's souls, but his judgment of others is harsh and unfair.

The word brand means "fire" in Norwegian (in the spelling of Ibsen's lifetime, spelled "brann" today), Danish, Swedish, German and Dutch. However Brand, Brandt, Brant and similar names are also known as surnames in Scandinavia, Germany and other countries, derived from the Germanic personal name Brando ("sword").

== Plot ==
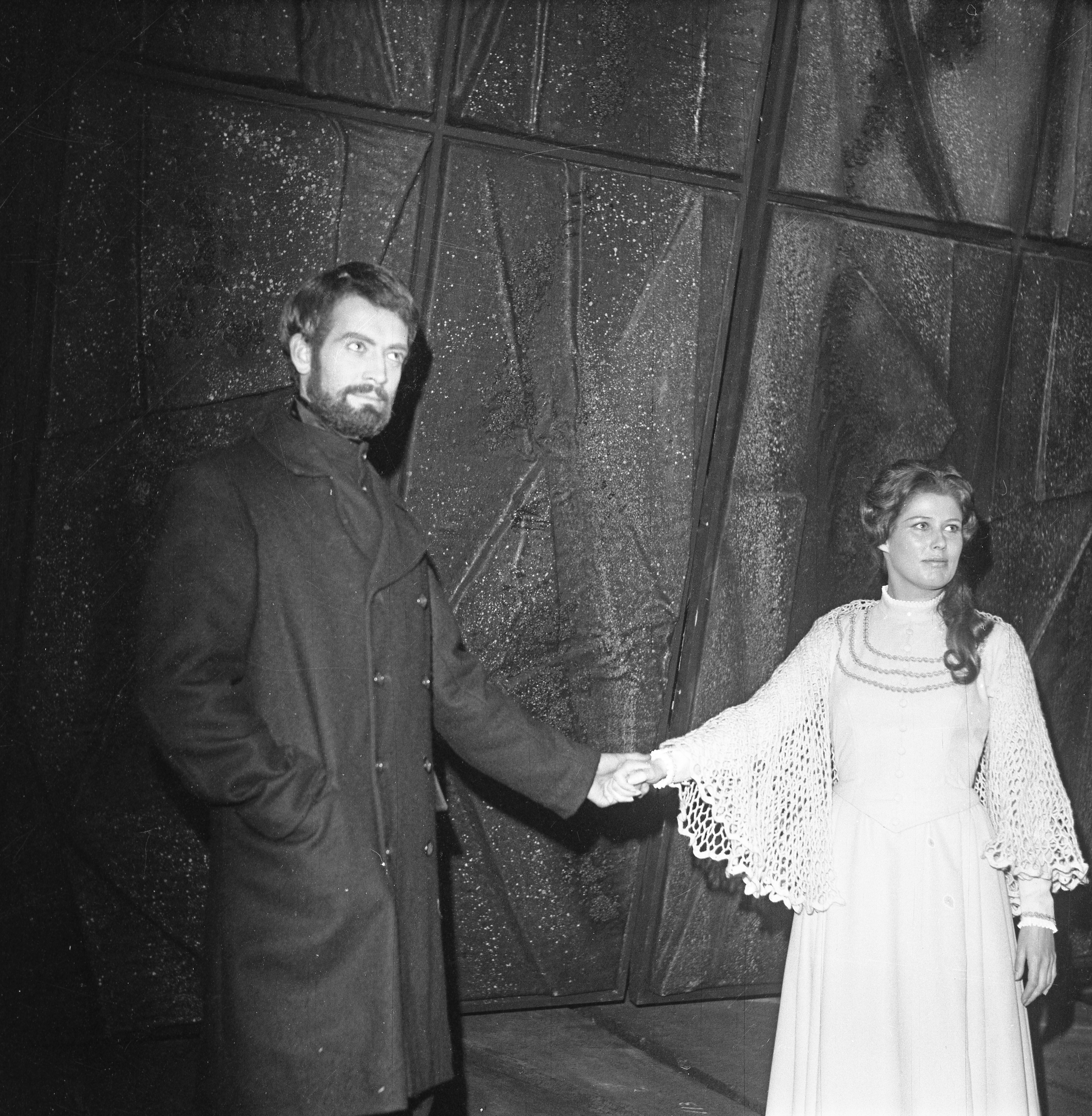
Arne Aas (Brand) and Inger Marie Andersen (Agnes) in a 1968 production of Brand at Den Nationale Scene in Bergen

=== First act ===
Brand in the mountains confronts different kinds of people: a farmer traveling with his son, who does not dare to brave a glacier on behalf of his dying daughter; Einar, a young painter with an easy-going attitude, and his fiancée, Agnes; and finally, a fifteen-year-old girl, Gerd, who claims to know of a bigger church in the mountains and hunts for a great hawk.

Einar and Brand were in school together. Brand taunts Einar for portraying God as an old man, who "sees through his fingers"; Brand wants to envision God as a young, heroic saviour. He believes that people have become too sloppy about their sins and shortcomings, because of the dogma that Christ, through his sacrifice, cleansed humanity once and for all.

Brand vows to confront the mindsets he has just met: the lazy mind, the undisciplined mind, and the wild mind. He ponders humanity's purpose and what should be.

=== Second act ===
In the valley where he was born, Brand finds great famine and need. The bailiff distributes bread for the hungry, and Brand questions the need for it. Meanwhile, a mother tells of her husband who needs absolution because he killed one of his children rather than seeing him starve. Then he harmed himself. Nobody dares to venture the rough fjord, but Brand goes in a boat and, to his surprise, Agnes follows him. Together, Brand and Agnes sail across the fjord, and the man receives absolution. A couple of farmers demand that he stay with them as their priest. Brand is reluctant to do this, but they use his own words against him, and he gives in.

Agnes tells of an "inner world being born" in one of Ibsen's best known soliloquies. She renounces Einar and chooses Brand. In the end of the second act, we meet Brand's mother, and learn that he grew up under the glacier, in a dreary place with no sun.

=== Third act ===
Some years later, Brand and Agnes live together with their son, Alf, who is grievously ill because of the climate. The local doctor urges him to leave for the sake of his son, but he hesitates. Meanwhile, Brand's mother is dying, and Brand impresses on her that she will not receive absolution unless she gives all her money to charity. She refuses, and Brand refuses to go to her.

On the question of his son's health, the doctor says that it is right to be "humane", whereas Brand answers: "Was God humane towards his son?" He states that by modern standards, the sacrifice of Christ would have boiled down to a "diplomatic heavenly charter". He clearly means that there is a difference between being a "human", and being a "humanist". In the end he almost gives in, but the farmers come to him and plead with him to stay. Then Gerd shows up, and states that evil forces will prevail if he leaves. The final straw is when she points out that his son is his "false god". Then he gives in and stays, knowing this will take his son's life. It is clear that he wants Agnes to choose for him, and she answers: "Go the road your God appointed for you".

=== Fourth act ===
After the death of his son, Brand wishes to build a bigger church in the parish. He refuses to mourn. Agnes comforts herself with the clothes of her dead son.

The bailiff is opposed to Brand, and tells him that he has growing support in the parish, explaining his own plans for building public institutions like a poorhouse, a jail and a political hall. The bailiff reveals that Brand's mother was forced to break with her true love, and married an old miser instead. The boy she loved then became involved with a Roma woman, resulting in the birth of Gerd. Brand is the result of the other, clearly loveless affair, and the bailiff suggests some kind of spiritual relationship between Brand and Gerd. After the bailiff leaves, a Roma woman arrives, demanding clothes for her freezing child (it is Christmas Eve). Brand then puts Agnes to the test, and she gives all of Alf's clothes to the Roma woman. As a result of this, Agnes renounces her life, and exclaims "I'm free". Brand accepts this, and Agnes dies.

=== Fifth act ===
Brand gets his new church built but comes to believe that his new church is still too small, and rebels against the authorities, the local dean and the bailiff. The provost talks about getting people to heaven "by the parish", and denounces individual thinking. Brand's answers to this are mostly sarcastic. The provost ends his speech mentioning the "erasing of God in the soul of man", something of which he seems to approve. Brand wants the opposite: individual freedom and a clear picture of God in man's soul.

Einar returns as a missionary soon after the provost's friendly speech. He has worked out a view of life that makes Brand shiver. Whereas Brand mourns the loss of his wife, Einar in the end thinks her death was righteous, because he regards her as a female seducer.

Brand protests against the heavy plight lain upon him by his elders, throws the key to the church into the fjord and makes for the mountain with the entire parish following him. He urges the people to "lift their faith" and make a "Church without limits" that is meant to embrace all sides of life. Brand states that they all shall be priests in the task of relieving all people from thralldom. The other clergymen protest against this because they no longer have any sway over their flocks. Brand is greatly respected by the common people, but the test is in the end too hard. They are lured down to the valley again by the bailiff, who fakes news of great economic opportunity (a large quantity of fish in the sea). The same people who followed Brand, then chase him with stones in their hands.

Brand is then left alone, struggling with doubt, remorse, and temptation, "the spirit of compromise". He does not yield to it, even when the spirit claims to be Agnes. The spirit says that the fall of man forever closed the gates to Paradise, but Brand states that the road of longing is still open. Then the spirit flees and says: "Die! The world does not need you!". Brand meets Gerd again, who thinks she sees the saviour in him, but Brand denies this. At the end of the play, Gerd takes him to the glacier, her personal church, and Brand recoils when understanding where he is, the "Ice-cathedral". He breaks down in tears. Gerd, who has been hunting the hawk from the start of the play, fires a shot at it, and lets loose a great avalanche, which in the end buries the entire valley.

In his dying words, Brand screams out to God, asking, "Does not salvation consider the will of man?" The final words are from an unknown voice: "He is the god of caritas."

== Analysis ==
=== Topics ===
The play debates freedom of will and the consequential choice. The problem is further debated in Peer Gynt. A crucial point is the discussion about the absence of love, and the sacrifice of Christ. As a consequence, the imitation of Christ can be regarded as a theme of the play (cf. Thomas à Kempis). A key to this interpretation is found in the name of Agnes, clearly derived from Agnus Dei, the lamb of God or the sacrificial lamb. One should be aware that Brand never asks anyone to sacrifice themselves for his cause. He rather warns them off, if they wish to pledge themselves to him – as is the case of Agnes. But when she chooses, Brand reminds her of the moral consequence of that choice – it is final, and there is no turning back. Agnes chooses anyway, both the sweet and the bitter.

One can also see a discussion in the play about what the Christian message really means, and what God's purpose with humankind really is. At one point Brand says: "The goal is to become blackboards for God to write upon". A reminiscence of this is found in Peer Gynt: "I was a paper, and was never written upon". The topics of the two plays are clearly related.

Brand was Ibsen's breakthrough as playwright and author. Ibsen was himself fond of the play's main character, and claimed that Brand was "himself in his best moments".

=== Brand's vision ===
Brand's vision is arguably a romantic one, and his address in the fifth act resembles in a way Henrik Wergeland`s vision in his great poem Man. His rebellion against the clergy, whom he feels are leading people astray rather than in the right direction, is also foreshadowed by Wergeland. He states here that "the spirit of compromise", a mentality he struggles to get free from all the way, is none other than Satan. When he is tempted later, we should be aware of this.

From the beginning, Brand wishes to make man whole, because he is aware that there has been a split, a sundering somewhere in the past, and he wishes to fight a fragmented view of man and God. This fragmentation makes man weak, he states, and an easy prey to temptation – a result of the fall of man. The definition of wholeness as a greater good and fragmentarism as a bad thing, is a philosophical statement, originally derived from Plato and Pythagoras. The sentence about a Christianity that embraces all sides of life, resembles the view of the Danish priest Grundtvig.

Throughout the play, we see that Brand looks for the right way to solve this problem, and makes new discoveries as he moves forward. One can also interpret the entire play as a tale of a developing soul, struggling with his connection to God. In this view, the collapse at the very end is a collapse of Brand's conflicting self, and the disaster opens a closed road for him. Thus, the final words of Gerd makes sense, as she finally manages to shoot the great hawk, with the words: "Salvation comes". This interpretation makes Gerd a restless voice in Brand's soul.

The play can also be seen as a discussion of romanticism and reality, in a quite disillusional way. Ibsen at this stage leaves romanticism well behind, and moves on to greater realism.

Some also consider Brand's character to have been based on the philosopher Søren Kierkegaard. Kierkegaard gave an essential place in his philosophy to the opposition between faith and reason, the importance of making decisive choices and suffering in the name of God, and whose life ended during an official attack he led against the church of his country (which he thought perverted the original Christian message, making it an empty religion).

Otto Weininger saw the play as expressing a deep understanding of Kantian ethics:-

There remains a most important point in which the Kantian system is often misunderstood. It reveals itself plainly in every case of wrong-doing. Duty is only towards oneself; Kant must have realised this in his earlier days when first he felt an impulse to lie. Except for a few indications in Nietzsche, and in Stirner, and a few others, Ibsen alone seems to have grasped the principle of the Kantian ethics (notably in "Brand" and "Peer Gynt").

== Musical settings ==
The symphonic poem by the Austrian composer Johanna Müller-Hermann (opus 25) composed in 1919 is a narrative meditation on themes from Ibsen's Brand, with the title Epilog zur einer Tragödie "Brand".
