= Little Eyolf =

Norwegian play

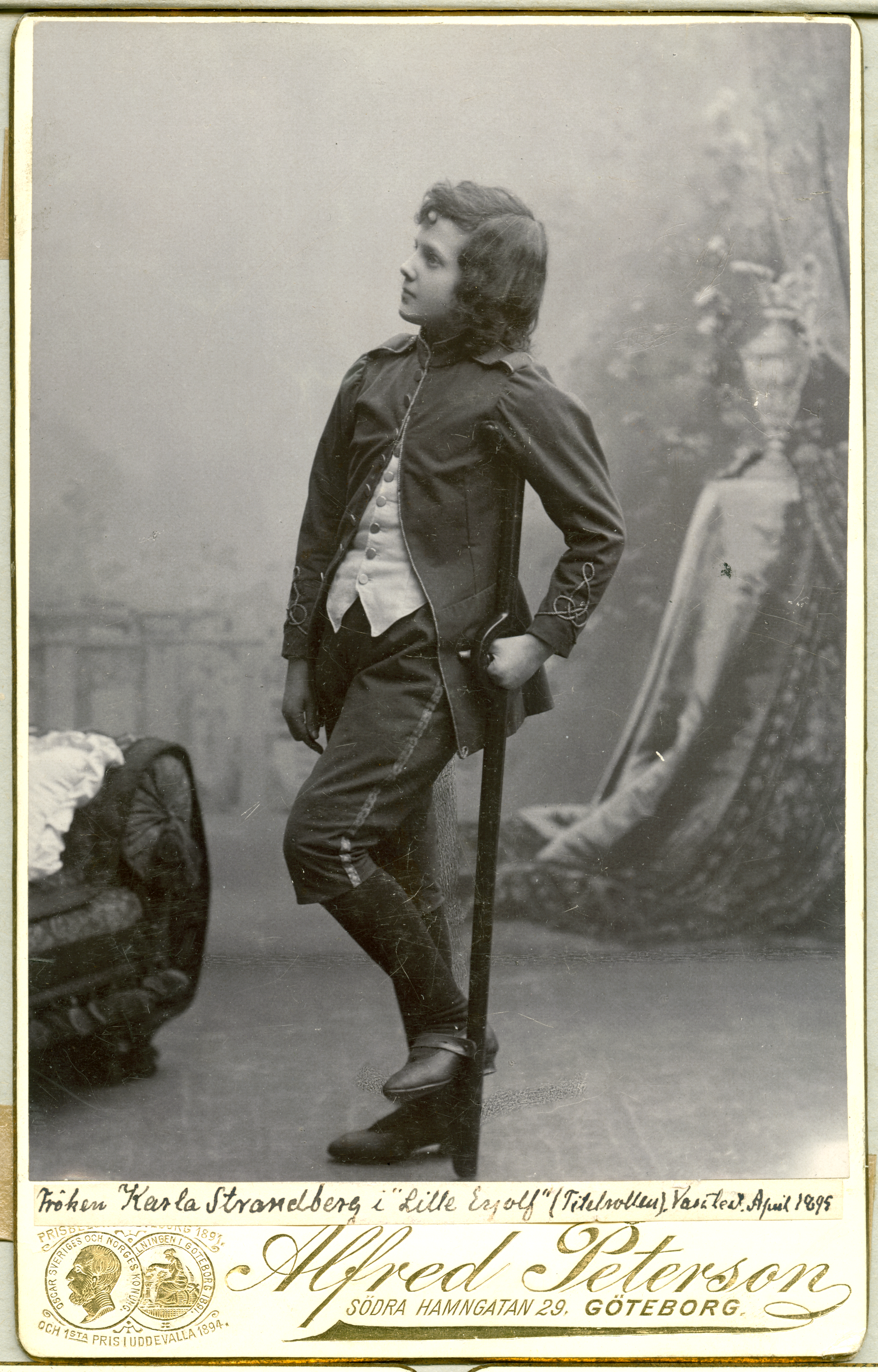
- Karla Strandberg in the title role at the Vasateatern, Stockholm, 1895
- Written by: Henrik Ibsen
- Characters: Alfred Allmers; Rita Allmers; Eyolf; Asta Allmers; Borghejm; Rat-Wife
- Original language: Dano-Norwegian
- Genre: Naturalism; Tragedy
- Setting: The Allmers house, Norway

Premiere
- Date premiered: December 3, 1894
- Place premiered: Theatre Royal Haymarket, London

Little Eyolf (Norwegian: Lille Eyolf) is an 1894 play by Norwegian playwright Henrik Ibsen. The play was first performed in Norwegian on December 3, 1894, at a 9 a.m. matinee performance in the Haymarket Theatre in London.

== Plot ==
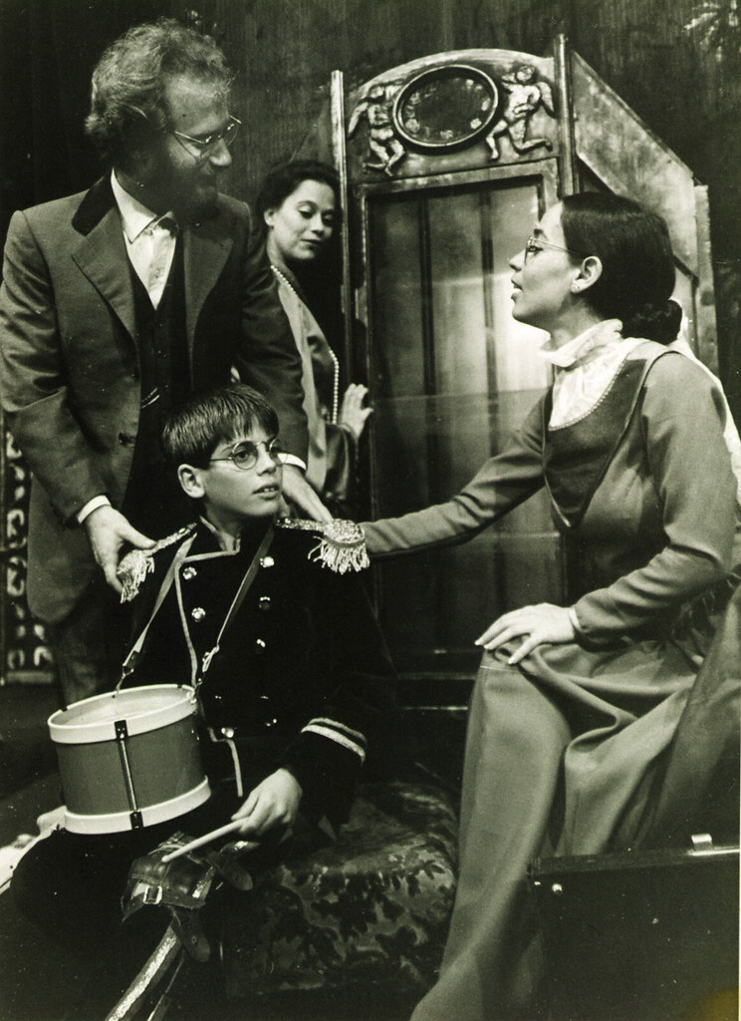
Scene from a 1986 production at the Jerusalem Khan Theatre

Little Eyolf tells the story of the Allmers family. At the outset of the play, the father, Alfred, has just returned from a trip to the mountains. While there, he resolved to focus foremost on raising his son Eyolf, rather than continue work on his book, Human Responsibility. Eyolf, though described as having "beautiful, intelligent eyes", is paralyzed in one of his legs, and thus his life is a sheltered one. He craves more than anything else to live the life of a normal boy, but his father knows that this is not possible. As such, Alfred wants to turn Eyolf towards loftier, intellectual pursuits.

The Allmers household is soon visited by the Rat-Wife, a woman capable of enchanting rodents into following her into the sea, where they drown. She leaves when informed that her services are unnecessary, and Eyolf follows her, unnoticed by Alfred, his wife Rita, and Alfred's sister Asta. Once Eyolf is gone, Alfred details his plan for being a better father to Eyolf and allowing him to attain happiness. In the course of his description, they are visited by Borghejm, an engineer, who is interested in Asta. While Asta and Borghejm walk outside, Rita's possessiveness of Alfred is revealed, during which she even wishes that Eyolf had never been born, as he diverts Alfred's attention from herself. Rita and Alfred's conversation is interrupted by the return of Asta and Borghejm, and then followed by sounds of shouts down by the sea, which reveal that Eyolf has drowned after following the Rat-Wife into the sea.

Down by the sea, Alfred mourns and is comforted by Asta. Rita and Borghejm follow, and once again Borghejm removes Asta from the action allowing for confrontation between Rita and Alfred. In the course of their conversation, Rita talks more about needing Alfred wholly while Alfred reveals that he married Rita in order to be able to better Asta's life. They also each blame each other for Eyolf's injury (as a baby, he fell off a table while they were making love), with Alfred accusing Rita of "luring me in to you", distracting him from his duty to watch over Eyolf.

Borghejm and Asta return, and Borghejm is once again unsuccessful at convincing Asta to marry him. However, when asked by Alfred and Rita to stay with them and take Eyolf's place, somehow allowing them to ease their guilt and avoid the problems in their relationship, Asta decides to marry Borghejm and follow him north. With Alfred indicating a continued unwillingness to be the husband Rita desires, she shares her new plan to try to better the lives of the poorer children who live down by the sea. In this, Alfred sees something positive again in Rita, and Alfred decides to remain, so that together they can atone for their mistakes.

== Characters ==
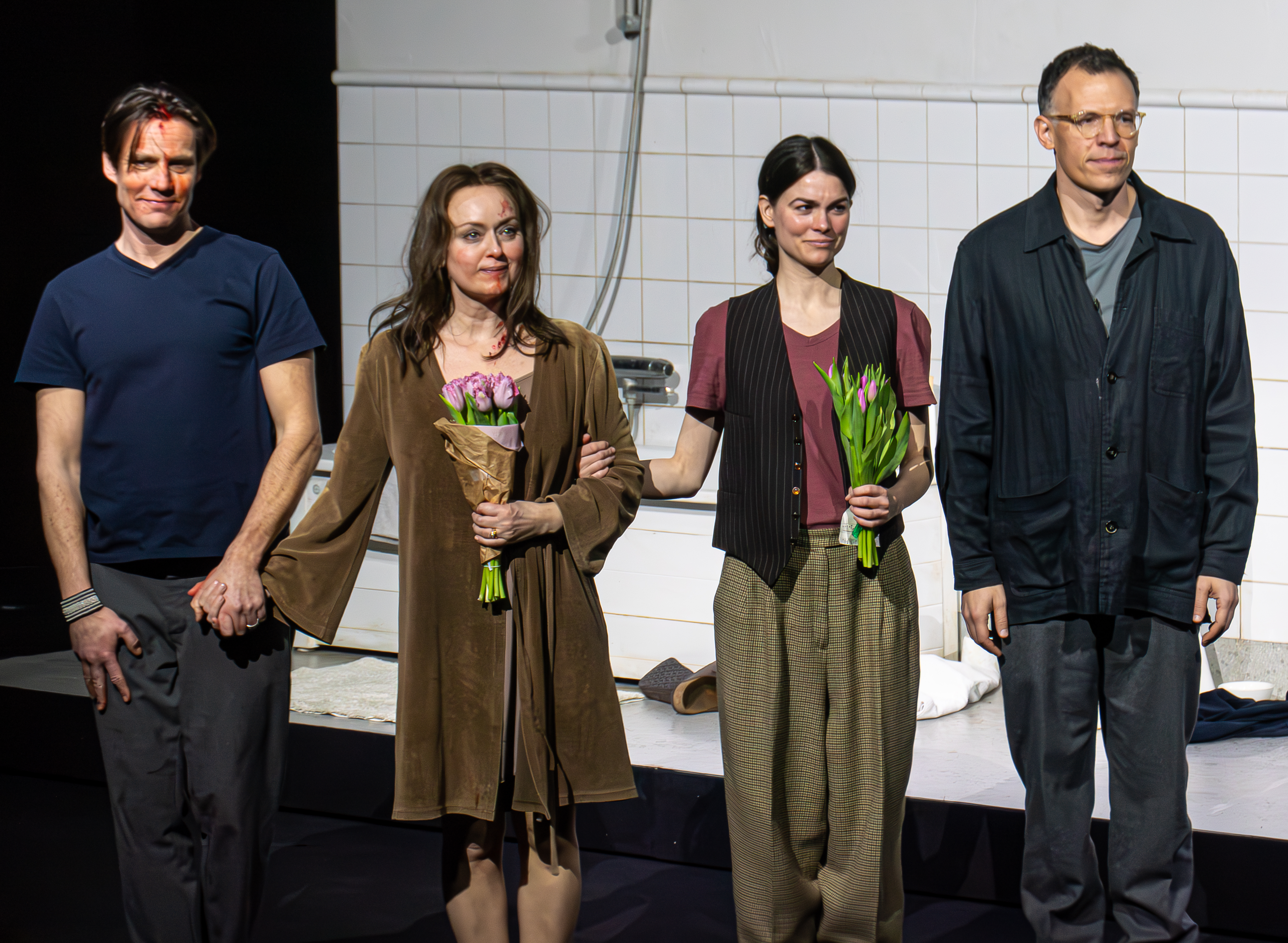
Cast of a 2024 production at the Dramaten, Stockholm (left to right): Erik Ehn (Alfred), Livia Millhagen (Rita), Karin Franz Körlof (Asta) and Hannes Meidal (the road-builder).

- Alfred Allmers
- Rita Allmers, his wife
- Eyolf, their son, nine years old
- Asta Allmers, Alfred's younger half-sister
- Borghejm, a road builder
- The Rat-Wife (Norwegian: Rottejomfruen, lit. 'The Rat-Maiden'; said to be based on Kristine Cathrine Ploug)

== Adaptations ==
A production of Little Eyolf was featured in the BBC television anthology series Play of the Month in July 1982. It stars Anthony Hopkins as Alfred, Diana Rigg as Rita, Charles Dance as Borghejm and Peggy Ashcroft in the role of the Rat Wife.

Samuel Adamson's Mrs Affleck, which translates the action to the 1950s and set it on the English coast in Kent, premiered at the National Theatre in January 2009 to mixed reviews. Cast credits are Claire Skinner as Rita Affleck, Angus Wright as Alfred Affleck, and Naomi Frederick as Audrey Affleck.

The 1989 film Jazeere, directed by Indian director Govind Nihlani, is a modernized take on the story. This Hindi version starred stalwarts like Ratna Pathak, Rajit Kapoor, Mita Vashisht, and Irrfan Khan. Vanraj Bhatia scored the background music for the film.

The 2009 film The Frost, directed by Spanish director Ferran Audí, is a modernized take on the story.

The 2016 Edinburgh Festival performance Little Wolfie, directed by Norwegian director Invi Brenna, is a contemporary adaptation for the 21st century.

== Homage ==
Actor-writer Charles Busch's 2023 play Ibsen's Ghost features a character called the "Rat Wife", in one of the play's many references to Ibsen's plays. In Busch's play, she is a former actress who abandoned her profession after sabotaging another performer during rehearsals for a Goldoni comedy.

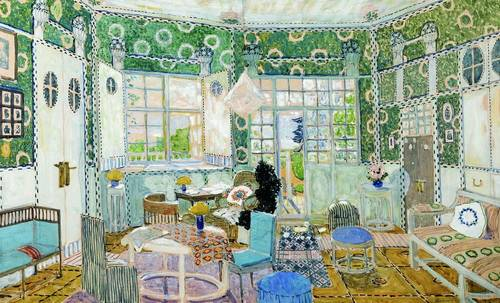
Set design for a 1907 production of the play

A sculpture of the Rat-Wife is located at Bakkestranda, Skien, Norway. Created by Marit Benthe Norheim, it is 7 m (23 ft) high.

== See also ==
- The Pied Piper of Hamelin
