= Greg Hersov =

British theatre director (born 1956)

Gregory Adam "Greg" Hersov (born 4 May 1956) is a British theatre director. Hersov was educated at Bryanston School and Mansfield College, Oxford.

== Overview ==
Hersov has been associated with the Royal Exchange Theatre in Manchester since 1979. He became an Artistic Director for the theatre in 1987. His productions at the Royal Exchange include a number of William Shakespeare plays, Death of a Salesman, The Entertainer, Uncle Vanya, and many other plays. In 1999, he directed Look Back in Anger at the Lyttelton Theatre (National Theatre) in London. His 2009 production of George Bernard Shaw's Widowers' Houses received critical acclaim. He stepped down as artistic director in 2014.

He had a long-standing association with Talawa Theatre Company serving on its board of trustees. In May 2019, Hersov was announced as director of Hamlet at Young Vic starring his long-time collaborator Cush Jumbo.

== Productions ==
Hersov's productions at the Royal Exchange Theatre include:

- One Flew Over the Cuckoo's Nest by Dale Wasserman with Jonathon Hackett and Linda Marlowe (1982)
- The Plough and the Stars by Seán O'Casey with Liam Neeson, Dierdra Morris, Bernard Hill and Val McLane (1984)
- Cat on a Hot Tin Roof by Tennessee Williams with James Maxwell and Connie Booth (1984)
- Entertaining Mr Sloane by Joe Orton with Adam Ant, Sylvia Syms and James Maxwell (1985)
- Death of a Salesman by Arthur Miller with Trevor Peacock (1985)
- Behind Heaven by Jonathon Moore with James Maxwell (1986)
- Woundings by Jeff Noon. World premiere with Reece Dinsdale (1986)
- The Alchemist by Ben Jonson with Jonathon Hackett and Michael Feast (1987)
- A Doll's House by Henrik Ibsen with Brenda Blethyn and David Horovitch (1987)
- All My Sons by Arthur Miller with John Thaw and Michael Maloney (1988)
- Born Yesterday by Garson Kanin with Brenda Blethyn (1988)
- A Midsummer Night's Dream with Kenneth Cranham and Fiona Victory (1988)
- The Voysey Inheritance by Harley Granville-Barker with James Maxwell and Robert Glenister (1989)
- Winding the Ball by Alex Finlayson. World premiere with David Schofield and Lisa Eichhorn (1989)
- The Crucible by Arthur Miller with David Schofield, Eleanor David and Barry Foster (1990)
- She's in Your Hands by Georges Feydeau with Lorraine Ashbourne, Richard McCabe and Colin Prockter (1990)
- The Beggar's Opera by John Gay with David Schofield (1991)
- The Idiot by Gerard McLarnon. World premiere with Robert Glenister (1991)
- Romeo and Juliet (TMA Award) with Michael Sheen and Kate Byers (1992)
- A View from the Bridge by Arthur Miller with Jonathon Hackett and Michael Sheen (1992)
- Blues for Mister Charlie by James Baldwin with Paterson Joseph, David Schofield and Nicholas Le Prevost (1992)
- The Comedy of Errors with Adrian Scarborough (1993)
- Little Murders by Jules Feiffer with Adrian Scarborough (1993)
- Venice Preserv'd by Thomas Otway with Helen McCrory and Diane Kent (1994)
- Look Back in Anger by John Osborne with Michael Sheen and Claire Skinner (1995)
- Crimes of the Heart by Beth Henley with Alison Peebles, Lesley Sharp and Robin Weaver (1995)
- The Misfits by Alex Finlayson. World premiere with Lisa Eichhorn (1996)
- Tobaccoland by Alex Finlayson. World premiere with Lisa Eichhorn (1999)
- King Lear with Tom Courtenay, Terence Wilton, David Robb and David Tennant (1999)
- Prize Night by Jim Cartwright. World premiere with Jim Cartwright, Tony Booth and David Fielder (1999)
- The Magistrate by Arthur Wing Pinero with Richard O'Callaghan and Russell Dixon (2001)
- Les Blancs by Lorraine Hansberry. Directed by Greg Hersov and Marianne Elliott with Paterson Joseph (2001)
- Uncle Vanya by Anton Chekhov with Tom Courtenay, Robert Glenister and Helen Schlesinger (2001)
- The Homecoming by Harold Pinter with Pete Postlethwaite (MEN Award) (2002)
- American Buffalo by David Mamet with Mike McShane, Ben Keaton (MEN Award) and Paul Popplewell (2002)
- The Seagull by Anton Chekhov with Emma Lowndes (MEN Award), Geraldine Alexander, Russell Dixon (MEN Award) and Steven Robertson (2003)
- The Playboy of the Western World by John Millington Synge with Michael Colgan and Mairead McKinley (2003)
- Major Barbara by George Bernard Shaw with Emma Cunniffe, Sorcha Cusack, David Horovitch and Michael Colgan (2004)
- Volpone by Ben Jonson with Gerard Murphy and Stephen Noonan (2004)
- Harvey by Mary Chase with Ben Keaton (2005)
- Cyrano de Bergerac by Edmond Rostand with Ben Keaton and Jessica Oyelowo (2006)
- The Tempest with Pete Postlethwaite, Samantha Robinson and Ewan Hooper (2007)
- The Flags by Bridget O’Connor with Francis Magee and Eamonn Owens (2007)
- Hay Fever by Noël Coward with Belinda Lang, Ben Keaton and Fiona Button (2008)
- Antigone by Sophocles with Matti Houghton and Ian Redford (2008)
- Widowers' Houses by George Bernard Shaw (2009)
- The Entertainer by John Osborne with David Schofield, David Ryall and Laura Rees (2009)
- Pygmalion by George Bernard Shaw with Cush Jumbo, Simon Robson, Terence Wilton and Ian Bartholomew (MEN Award) (2010)
- Zack by Harold Brighouse with Justin Moorhouse, Kelly Price and Polly Hemingway (2010)
- As You Like It with Cush Jumbo (Ian Charleson Award), Ben Batt, Kelly Hotten, Ian Bartholomew, Terence Wilton and James Clyde (2011)
- Two by Jim Cartwright with Justin Moorhouse and Victoria Elliott (2012)
- Lady Windermere's Fan by Oscar Wilde with Lysette Anthony, Laura Rees and Milo Twomey (2012)
- A Doll's House by Henrik Ibsen with Cush Jumbo (Theatre Awards UK), David Sturzaker, Kelly Hotten, Jack Tarlton and Jamie De Courcey(2013)

== Bibliography ==
- Murray, Braham (2007). The Worst It Can Be Is a Disaster. London: Methuen Drama. ISBN 978-0-7136-8490-2.
- The Royal Exchange Theatre Company Words & Pictures 1976 – 1998. The Royal Exchange Theatre Company Limited. 1998. ISBN 0-9512017-1-9.
