= Sarah Frankcom =

English theatre director

Sarah Frankcom (born 1968) is an English theatre director. She was an artistic director of the Royal Exchange Theatre in Manchester from 2008 to 2019, when she became director of the London Academy of Music and Dramatic Art.

== Early life ==
Sarah Frankcom was born in Sheffield. She studied at Westfield College which was a constituent college of the University of London and then at Goldsmiths College, London where she obtained her PGCE.

== Career ==
After working as a drama teacher in the East End, she began to work with new writers and drama schools. She spent time at the National Theatre Studio, Oval House and The Red Room and taught at the Poor School. She originally joined the Royal Exchange Theatre as literary manager in 2000, before becoming an associate artistic director and then artistic director in 2008. With the departure of Greg Hersov in 2014 she became the sole artistic director.

In October 2018 she won the UK Theatre Award for best director for her production of Our Town.

In August 2021 it was announced that Sarah Frankcom would step down as Director of LAMDA, and that the institution was conducting a search for a successor.

== Productions ==
=== Royal Exchange Theatre ===
Her credits include:

- Snapshots by Fiona Padfield. World premiere directed by Braham Murray and Sarah Frankcom with Terence Wilton (Mar. 2000)
- The Ghost Train Tattoo by Simon Robson. World premiere directed by Braham Murray and Sarah Frankcom with Terence Wilton, Joanna David and Gabrielle Drake (Mar. 2000)
- Habitat by Judith Thompson (May 2002)
- Moonshed by Aisha Khan (Jun. 2003)
- Across Oka by Robert Holman (Oct. 2003)
- The Rise and Fall of Little Voice by Jim Cartwright with Denise Black (Manchester Evening News Award), Emma Lowndes and Roy Barraclough (Feb. 2004)
- Basil and Beattie by Linda Brogan with Eileen O’Brien and Wyllie Longmore (May 2004)
- Kes by Barry Hines with Andrew Garfield (Manchester Evening News Theatre Awards]]), William Beck and Jane Hazlegrove (Oct. 2004)
- Rutherford & Son by Githa Sowerby with Maurice Roëves, Maxine Peake, Daniel Brocklebank and Jonas Armstrong (Feb. 2005)
- On the Shore of the Wide World by Simon Stephens (Olivier Award). World Premiere with Nicholas Gleaves, Siobhan Finneran (Manchester Evening News Theatre Awards) and Eileen O’Brien (April 2005)
- Christmas is Miles Away by Chloe Moss. World premiere (2007)
- Separate Tables by Terence Rattigan with Nigel Cooke, Claire Holman, Alexandra Matthie and Ian Barritt (June 2006)
- Mary Barton adapted by Rona Munroe with Kellie Bright, Roger Morlidge and William Ash (Oct. 2006)
- Who's Afraid of Virginia Woolf? by Edward Albee with Barbara Marten and Philip Bretherton (Apr. 2007)
- Pretend you have Big Buildings by Ben Musgrave directed with Jo Combes (Jul. 2007)
- Strawgirl by Jackie Kay (Nov/ 2007)
- The Adoption Papers by Jackie Kay (Nov. 2007)
- The Children's Hour by Lillian Hellman with Maxine Peake (MEN Award), Charlotte Emmerson and Kate O'Flynn (TMA Award) (Mar. 2008)
- Three Sisters by Anton Chekhov with Emma Cunniffe, Lucy Black and Beth Cooke (Sep. 2008)
- See How They Run by Philip King with Nick Caldecott, Laura Rogers and Kate O'Flynn (Dec. 2008)
- Punk Rock by Simon Stephens (Manchester Evening News Theatre Awards) with Jessica Raine (Manchester Evening News Theatre Awards) and Tom Sturridge (Manchester Evening News Theatre Awards and Critics' Circle Award) (Oct. 2009)
- Blithe Spirit by Noël Coward with Annette Badland, Suranne Jones and Milo Twomey (Dec 2009)
- The Lady from the Sea by Henrik Ibsen with Neve McIntosh and Reece Dinsdale (Oct. 2010)
- A View From The Bridge by Arthur Miller with Con O'Neill and Ian Redford (June 2011)
- Miss Julie by August Strindberg with Maxine Peake (Manchester Theatre Awards) as Miss Julie, Joe Armstrong as Jean, Liam Gerrard as the fiddler and Carla Henry as Kristin (April 2012)
- Orpheus Descending by Tennessee Williams with Imogen Stubbs as Lady Torrance, Val Xavier as Luke Norris and Jodie McNee as Carol Cutrere (November 2012)
- The Masque of Anarchy by Percy Bysshe Shelley with Maxine Peake for the Manchester International Festival(July 2013)
- That Day We Sang by Victoria Wood with Anna Francolini as Enid and Dean Andrews as Tubby (December 2013)
- Blindsided by Simon Stephens with Julie Hesmondhalgh as Susan Heyer, Andrew Sheridan as John Connolly, Katie West as Cathy Heyer, Jack Deam as Isaac Berg and Rebecca Callard as Siobhan Hennessy (January 2014)
- Hamlet with Maxine Peake as Hamlet, John Shrapnel as Claudius/Ghost, Barbara Marten as Gertrude, Gillian Bevan as Polonia, Katie West as Ophelia and Claire Benedict as Marcella/Player King (September 2014) The production was filmed and released through the Royal Exchange Theatre.
- The Skriker by Caryl Churchill. Commissioned and produced with the Manchester International Festival with Maxine Peake as The Skriker (July 2015)
- A Streetcar Named Desire by Tennessee Williams with Maxine Peake as Blanche DuBois, Ben Batt as Stanley Kowalski, Sharon Duncan-Brewster as Stella Kowalski and Youssef Kerkour as Harold Mitchell (October 2016)
- Our Town by Thornton Wilder with Youssef Kerkour as Stage Manager, Nicholas Khan as Dr Gibbs, Carla Henry as Mrs Julia Gibbs, Graeme Hawley as Mr Webb and Kelly Hotten as Mrs Myrtle Webb. UK Theatre Award for best director (September 2017)
- Happy Days by Samuel Beckett with Maxine Peake as Winnie and David Crellin as Willie (June 2018)
- Death of a Salesman by Arthur Miller with Don Warrington as Willy Loman, Maureen Beattie as Linda Loman, Ashley Zhangazha as Biff and Buom Tihngang as Happy (Oct. 2018)
- West Side Story by Leonard Bernstein and Stephen Sondheim with Gabriela Garcia as Maria, Andy Coxon as Tony, Jocasta Almgill as Anita, Michael Duke as Riff and Fernando Marino as Bernado. (April 2019)
- Light Falls by Simon Stephens with Rebecca Manley as Christine, Lloyd Hutchinson as Bernard, David Moorst as Steven, Katie West as Ashe and Witney White as Jess (October 2019)

=== Other theatres ===
- The Five Wives of Maurice Pinder by Matt Charman at the National Theatre with Sorcha Cusack and Adam Gillen (2007)
- The Breach by Naomi Wallace at the Hampstead Theatre with Tom Lewis (actor) (2022)
