= Angela Wynter =

Jamaican-British actress (born 1957)

- Born: 14 July 1957 (age 68); Kingston, Jamaica
- Occupation: Actress
- Years active: 1981–present
- Television: EastEnders; Doctors

Angela Wynter (born 14 July 1957) is a Jamaican-British actress. She is known for her role as Yolande Trueman in the BBC soap opera EastEnders (2003–2008, 2017, 2023–present). In 2021, she joined the cast of the BBC soap opera Doctors for a three-month stint as Makeda Sylvester.

== Early life ==
Wynter was born on 14 July 1957 in Kingston, Jamaica. After emigrating to the United Kingdom, she moved to Hinckley, Leicestershire.

== Career ==
Wynter was in a band called View From The Hill in the 1980s. In her first acting role, a stage play titled Meetings, she acted opposite her later on-screen EastEnders spouse Rudolph Walker. Wynter received acclaim for playing the role of Mout in the Talawa Theatre Company production of Sol B River's monologue To Rahtid, directed by Yvonne Brewster at the Young Vic Studio in 1996.

In 2003, Wynter was cast in the BBC soap opera EastEnders as Yolande Trueman. She based the characterisation of Yolande on her deceased sister, Merlene. She left the role in 2008, later making a guest appearance in 2017 and returned permanently in 2023. On 12 January 2017, Wynter appeared in the BBC drama Death in Paradise in the episode "The Secret of the Flame Tree" as Sylvie Baptiste. On 3 February 2019, Wynter appeared in the ITV drama Vera in the episode "The Seagull". In 2021, she joined the cast of the BBC soap opera Doctors for a short stint as Makeda Sylvester.

In November 2023, it was announced that Wynter had been cast as Cherry Sunday in Doctor Who, the adopted grandmother of companion Ruby Sunday in the show's fourteenth series.

== Filmography ==
=== Film ===
Year	Title	Role	Notes
1982	Burning an Illusion	Cynthia	
1987	Elphida	Elphida	
1989	Dreaming Rivers	Daughter	Short film
1992	Money Talk	Mother	Short film
1994	The Concrete Garden	Aunty Joyce	Short film
1995	Now What	Narrator	TV movie
2003	Wondrous Oblivion	Grace Wiseman	
2015	Lia	Jackie's Mum	Short film
2015	Gracie	Gracie	Short film
2019	Responsible Child	Grace	
2019	Last Christmas	Casting Director	
2020	Home by 8.30	Grandma	Short film
2021	Canvas 5	Journalist	Short film

=== Television ===
Year	Title	Role	Notes
1983	The Nation's Health	Herself	
1983–1984	No Problem!	Melba	5 episodes
1984	Minder	Sylvia	
1984	Mitch	Dorothy	
1992	The Bill	Landlady	
1993	What You Lookin' at?	Mrs. Williams	
1994	Murder Most Horrid	Hotel Receptionist	
1994	Cracker	Barbara Charles	
1996	In Motion	Narrator	
2001	As If	Sasha's Mum	
2002	Cutting It	Estelle	
2002	Holby City	Debbie	
2002, 2009, 2013, 2019	Doctors	Various	4 episodes
2003–2008, 2017, 2023–present	EastEnders	Yolande Trueman	Regular role
2009	Holby City	Honeysuckle McKenzie	
2011	Injustice	Liam's Mother	1 episode
2011	Planet of the Apemen: Battle for Earth	Wangari	2 episodes
2012	Casualty	Hayley Harper	
2015–2016	Holby City	Ina Effanga	7 episodes
2017	Death in Paradise	Sylvie Baptiste	
2017–2018	The Tunnel	Celeste	
2019	Cleaning Up	Amber	
2021	Doctors	Makeda Sylvester	20 episodes
2021	Whitstable Pearl	Monica	
2022	Mood	Gloria	
2022	This England	Sarah Boateng	
2022	Vampire Academy	Hight Priestess Irene	
2023	Call the Midwife	Florence Wray	2 episodes
2023	Three Little Birds	Miss Eunice	
2023	Time	May Sinclair	
2023–present	Doctor Who	Cherry Sunday	5 episodes

=== Audiobooks ===
Year	Title	Role	Notes
2024	Doctor Who: The Church on Ruby Road	Narrator	Audiobook Novelisation

== Awards and nominations ==
Year	Ceremony	Category	Work	Result	Ref.
2024	RadioTimes.com Soap Awards	Best Actor	EastEnders	Won	
2024	National Television Awards	Serial Drama Performance	EastEnders	Nominated	
2025	British Soap Awards	Best On-Screen Partnership (With Rudolph Walker)	EastEnders	Won	
