= Ian Bartholomew =

British actor and musician

- Born: 23 August 1954 (age 72); Gosport, England
- Occupation: Actor
- Years active: 1977–present
- Notable work: Perfect Scoundrels (1990–1992); Harry (1993–1995); Without Motive (2000–2001); Empire (2005); South Riding (2011); Coronation Street (2018–2022)
- Children: 2

Ian Bartholomew (born 23 August 1954) is a British actor and musician from Portsmouth, England who has worked widely in both theatre and television. In March 2018, Bartholomew joined the cast of ITV soap opera Coronation Street, as Geoff Metcalfe. He also played Chitterlow in the revival cast of Half A Sixpence and the Baker in the original West End production of Into the Woods opposite Imelda Staunton as his wife.

== Career ==
Bartholomew was born in Portsmouth, Hampshire, and brought up in Gosport. In television Bartholomew's work has ranged from The Darling Buds of May, Rumpole of the Bailey, Minder, and more recently, Making Waves, Spooks and Marcella.

On stage he has been in productions such as A Man for All Seasons at the Redgrave Theatre in Farnham, Mirandolina and Assassins. In 2005 he was in the acclaimed production of Who's Afraid of Virginia Woolf? by Edward Albee in the starring role of George at the Liverpool Playhouse and in that same year also at the playhouse he appeared in Alan Ayckbourn's Christmas comedy Season's Greetings. At the Menier Chocolate Factory in London he appeared in the new musical Take Flight in 2007. In 2010 he was well received as Eliza Doolittle's father in the Royal Exchange's production of Pygmalion. In 2011 in Mogadishu by Vivienne Franzmann at the Royal Exchange in Manchester and then at the Lyric Theatre in London.

In 2017 he recorded two songs for the album Wit & Whimsy - Songs by Alexander S. Bermange (one solo and one featuring all of the album's 23 artists), which reached No. 1 in the iTunes comedy album chart.

Bartholomew joined the cast of Coronation Street as Geoff Metcalfe in March 2018.

== Personal life ==
Bartholomew is married to theatre director Loveday Ingram. Their first child was born in March 2004 and their youngest was born in December 2006.

== Filmography ==
=== Film ===
Year	Title	Role	Notes
2023	Operation Fortune: Ruse de Guerre	Bakker	
2023	Wonka	Skeptical Old Man	
2025	Fackham Hall	Austin Blaine	

=== Television ===
Year	Title	Role	Production	Notes
1981	Bergerac	Simon Gibbins	BBC	Episode: "Unlucky Dip"
1982	Crown Court	James MaccPherson	ITV/Granada Television	Episode: "The Fiddling Connection"
1983	The Professionals	Miller	ITV/LWT	Episode: "Cry Wolf"
1984	Minder	Keith Wendell	ITV/Thames Television	Episode: "Get Daley"
1990–1992	Perfect Scoundrels	Inky	ITV/TVS	
1991	The Darling Buds of May	Tommy Mason	ITV/Yorkshire Television	Episode: "Christmas is Coming"
1992	The Blackheath Poisonings	Jenkins	ITV	2 episodes
1992, 1995, 1997, 2002	The Bill	Salter / P.C. Gunnell A.I.U. / Pete Gapper / Alfred 'Manny' Manola	ITV/Thames Television/Central Independent Television	4 episodes
1993	Minder	Ralphy	ITV/Thames Television	Episode: "Uneasy Rider"
1993	Love Hurts	D.I. Payne	BBC	Episode: "If the Cap Fits"
1993–1995	Harry	Snappy	BBC	
1994	Jo Brand Through the Cakehole	Himself	Channel 4	Episode: "Jo Brand Through the Christmas Cakehole"
1996	Is It Legal?	Terry Beath	ITV/Carlton Television	Episode: "Office Party"
1997	Wycliffe	Mick Sennan	ITV/HTV	Episode: "Close to Home"
1998	The Ruth Rendell Mysteries	Stanley Trotter	ITV/Meridian Television	Episode: "Road Rage"
1999	Casualty	Mick Milburn	BBC	Episodes: "Benny and the Vets: Parts 1 & 2"
2000–2001	Without Motive	Ronnie Stocks	ITV/HTV	
2004	William and Mary	Housing Inspector	ITV/Meridian Television	Series 2, Episode 4
2004	Making Waves	Lt. Cdr. William Lewis	ITV/Carlton Television	
2005	New Tricks	Tallis	BBC	Series 2, Episode 1
2005	Empire	Cimber		
2005	Open Wide	Ray	ITV/Thames Television	Television film
2006	Spooks	Dainiel Wise	BBC	Series 5, Episodes 6 & 7
2007	Thieves Like Us	Sergent Atwell	BBC Three	Episode: "The Jackets Job"
2008	HolbyBlue	Keith Sparrow	BBC	Series 2, Episode 9
2008	New Tricks	Sam Tallis	BBC	Episode: "Spare Parts"
2008	Heartbeat	Russell Bryant	ITV/Yorkshire Television	Episode: "You Never Can Tell"
2010	Foyle's War	Dillon	ITV/Greenlit Productions	Episode: "The Hide"
2010	Accused	Stephen Sullivan	BBC	Episode: "Helen's Story"
2011	Camelot	Caitran	Channel 4	Episode: "Homecoming"
2011	South Riding	Gaius Drew	BBC	3 part mini series
2016	Maigret	The Baron	ITV	Episode: "Maigret Sets a Trap"
2016	New Blood	Tom Robinson	BBC	
2018−2022	Coronation Street	Geoff Metcalfe	ITV	Regular role

=== Video games ===
Year	Title	Role	Notes
2004	World of Warcraft		Voice
2018	World of Warcraft: Battle for Azeroth		Voice

== Theatre ==
His work in the theatre includes: -

- Truffaldino, The Servant of Two Masters by Carlo Goldoni. Directed by Martin Duncan at the Richmond Theatre (1982)
- Deemer,Winding the Ball by Alex Finlayson. World premiere directed by Greg Hersov at the Royal Exchange, Manchester (1989)
- Joseph Surface,The School for Scandal by Richard Brinsley Sheridan. Directed by Phyllida Lloyd at the Royal Exchange, Manchester (1990)
- Oliver,Doctor Heart by Peter Muller. British premiere directed by Braham Murray at the Royal Exchange, Manchester (1991)
- The Fool, King Lear. Directed by Greg Hersov at the Royal Exchange, Manchester (1999)
- George, Who's Afraid of Virginia Woolf? by Edward Albee at the Liverpool Playhouse (2005)
- Charles Guiteau, Assassins by Stephen Sondheim. Directed by Nicolai Forster at the Crucible Theatre, Sheffield (2006)
- Count Albafiorita, Mirandolina by Goldoni. Directed by Jonathon Munby at the Royal Exchange, Manchester (2006)
- George Putnam, Take Flight by David Shire and Richard Maltby. Directed by Sam Buntrock at the Menier Chocolate Factory (2007)
- Lickcheese, Widowers' Houses by George Bernard Shaw. Directed by Greg Hersov at the Royal Exchange, Manchester (2009)
- Horace Vandergelder, Hello Dolly. Directed by Timothy Sheader at the Open Air Theatre, Regent's Park(2009)
- Paul Hammond, The Power of Yes by David Hare. Directed by Angus Jackson at the Royal National Theatre (2009)
- Alfred Doolttle, Pygmalion by George Bernard Shaw. Directed by Greg Hersov at the Royal Exchange, Manchester (2010)
- Chris, Mogadishu by Vivienne Franzmann. World premiere directed by Matthew Dunster at the Royal Exchange, Manchester (2011)
- Touchstone,As You Like It. Directed by Greg Hersov at the Royal Exchange, Manchester (2011)
- Arturo Ui,The Resistible Rise of Arturo Ui. Directed by Walter Meierjohann at the Nottingham Playhouse (2011)
