= Jamie de Courcey =

English actor

Jamie de Courcey is an English actor. He has appeared in a number of British television shows, including The Crown, The Tunnel, Downton Abbey, Taboo, Agatha Christie's Poirot, and Midsomer Murders. He has also appeared in the films, Rush, directed by Ron Howard, Michael Morpurgo's Private Peaceful, and as Vincent van Gogh in Vincent Van Gogh: A New Way of Seeing and Sunflowers. He trained at the Royal Academy of Dramatic Art.

De Courcey lives in London and, since 2016, he has been in a relationship with actress Amara Karan.

He holds British and Irish citizenship. His father is Roger De Courcey.

== Theatre ==
| Year | Title | Director | Company | Venue(s) |
|---|---|---|---|---|
| 2020 | The Boss of It All | Jack McNamara | New Perspectives | Soho Theatre |
| 2019 | The Man Without a Past | Jack McNamara | New Perspectives | |
| 2019 | A Fortunate Man | Michael Pinchbeck | New Perspectives | Esplanade - Theatres on the Bay and Studiobühne Köln |
| 2017 | The Cherry Orchard | Giles Croft | | Nottingham Playhouse |
| 2017 | Richard III | Mehmet Ergen | | Arcola Theatre (toured to Clásicos en Alcalá) |
| 2014 | This Was a Man | Belinda Lang | | Finborough Theatre |
| 2013 | The Ashes | Giles Croft | | Nottingham Playhouse |
| 2013 | A Doll's House | Greg Hersov | | Royal Exchange, Manchester |
| 2012 | The Sacred Flame | Matthew Dunster | English Touring Theatre | |
| 2011 | The Ashes | Giles Croft | | Nottingham Playhouse |
| 2011 | Sold | Natalie Ibu | | Theatre 503 |
| 2010 | Doctor Faustus | Toby Frow | | Royal Exchange, Manchester |
| 2010 | Nineteen Eighty-Four | Matthew Dunster | | Royal Exchange, Manchester |
| 2010 | Decade | Gemma Fairlie | | Theatre 503 |
| 2008 | Hangover Square | Gemma Fairlie | | Finborough Theatre |
| 2007 | Alphabetical Order | Philip Wilson | | Salisbury Playhouse. |
| 2006 | A Voyage Round My Father | Thea Sharrock | | Donmar Warehouse and Wyndham's Theatre. |
| 2005 | The Rivals | Christopher Morahan | | Theatre Royal, Bath. |
| 2005 | Hamlet | Rupert Goold | | Royal Theatre, Northampton. |
| 2004 | The Importance of Being Earnest | Braham Murray | | Royal Exchange, Manchester |
| 2004 | Great Expectations | Jacob Murray | | Royal Exchange, Manchester |
| 2003 | An Inspector Calls | Stephen Daldry | National Theatre (touring) | |
| 2002 | Macbeth | Jack Shepherd and Mehmet Ergen | | Arcola Theatre |
| 2001 | Alice in Wonderland | Rachel Kavanaugh | Royal Shakespeare Company | |
| 2000 | Another Country | Stephen Henry | | Arts Theatre. |
| 2000 | The Importance of Being Earnest | Rob Swain | Harrogate Theatre (touring) | |
| 1999 | The School of Night | Jack Shepherd | | Chichester Festival. |
| 1999 | Plenty | Jonathan Kent | Almeida | Albery Theatre |
| 1998 | Skylight | Rob Swain | | Harrogate Theatre |

== Film ==
| Year | Title | Director |
|---|---|---|
| 2021 | Sunflowers | David Bickerstaff |
| 2018 | Say My Name | Jay Stern |
| 2015 | Vincent Van Gogh: A New Way of Seeing | David Bickerstaff |
| 2013 | Rush | Ron Howard |
| 2012 | Private Peaceful | Pat O'Connor |

== Television ==
| Year | Title | Director(s) |
|---|---|---|
| 2018 | Vera | Chris Baugh |
| 2017 | Taboo | Kristoffer Nyholm and Anders Engstrom |
| 2016 | The Crown | Stephen Daldry and Julian Jarrold |
| 2016 | The Tunnel | Mike Barker |
| 2010 | Downton Abbey | Brian Percival |
| 2008 | Foyle's War | Tristram Powell |
| 2006 | Wire in the Blood | Andy Goddard |
| 2004 | Heartbeat | Gerry Mill |
| 2004 | Agatha Christie's Poirot | Simon Langton |
| 2002 | Midsomer Murders | Sarah Hellings |
| 2001 | The Way We Live Now | David Yates |
| 2000 | Beast | Martin Dennis |
| 1992 | Archer's Goon | Marilyn Fox |

== Short film ==
| Year | Title | Director |
|---|---|---|
| 2020 | The Theatre | David Bickerstaff |
| 2012 | Wonder | Johnny Daukes |
