= Greta Mendez =

Trinidad-born dancer and choreographer (born 1954)

Greta Mendez MBE
- Born: 1954 (age 71–72); Trinidad
- Occupations: Dancer, choreographer, director and carnival specialist
- Website: gmendez-owd.co.uk

Greta Mendez MBE (born 1954) is a Trinidad-born choreographer, former dancer and carnivalist, who has worked as a dance and drama tutor, theatre and movement director, performance artist, producer, and filmmaker. She is recognised as having "shaped contemporary British performance" for more than four decades. Her performance credits include the Scottish Ballet, MAAS Movers and the Royal Opera House, and she has directed for Talawa Theatre Company and elsewhere, in addition to significant involvement with the Notting Hill Carnival, producing numerous bands and being a winning masquerader, among other contributions.

== Backkground and career ==
Mendez has said: "Dance was and still is my first language. In Trinidad we learnt, Scottish, Irish and Morris dances. We tasted African and Indian dance. We learnt the waltz, the foxtrot and, of course, Samba, Rumba etc. But the world is much bigger than that in terms of dance language. Therefore I knew I had to travel abroad in order to learn more." Having trained at such institutions in Europe as Det Dansk Ballet Academy and the London Contemporary Dance School, Mendez went on to join in 1979 the Scottish Ballet, becoming the first Trinidadian to dance with the company.

Since the 1970s, she has been performing and working in different roles in dance and theatre, and is particularly notable as a pioneer in the development of independent dance in England. Mendez has performed as a dancer internationally and at a variety of venues, including the Royal Opera House, as well as in prisons and on television. She is recognised for her work at MAAS Movers, the UK's first black contemporary dance company, at Nin Dance Company and her own Battimamzel Dance Company. Mendez was an Associate Director of Talawa Theatre Company (she was credited by Yvonne Brewster, co-founder of Talawa, among key names who contributed to the company's successful longevity) and has also been an Advisor and Assessor for the Arts Council.

In October 2021, Mendez curated a new cross-genre festival named "A Time To Breathe".

In the 2021 New Year Honours, Mendez was appointed a Member of the Order of the British Empire (MBE) for services to dance.

== Further resding ==
- Ramdhanie, Robert (2026). The Black Dance Movement in England 1940 – 2000: Identity, Spirituality and Continuity. Routledge. ISBN 9781041026259.
