= Frances Tomelty =

Irish actress

- Born: Belfast
- Occupation: Actress
- Spouse: Gordon "Sting" Sumner (m. 1976; div. 1984)
- Children: 2, including Joe Sumner
- Parent: Joseph Tomelty

Frances Tomelty is a Northern Irish actress whose numerous television credits include Strangers (1978–1979), Testament of Youth (1979), Inspector Morse (1988), Cracker (1993), The Amazing Mrs Pritchard (2006), The White Queen (2013) and Unforgotten (2015). Her theatre roles include playing Kate in the original production of Dancing at Lughnasa in Dublin (1990). She was married to the musician Sting from 1976 to 1984.

== Career ==
Tomelty's television work has included Survivors, Bergerac, Blue Money, Inspector Morse, Lucy Sullivan is Getting Married, Strangers, Midsomer Murders, 99-1, Coronation Street, Cracker, Spooks, Casualty, The Amazing Mrs Pritchard, Holby City, Law & Order: UK, The Royal, Waking the Dead, Silent Witness, Unforgotten,Outlander Catastrophe, Death in Paradise as well as big-budget adaptations Atlantis, Merlin, The White Queen, and A Perfect Spy.

On film, she has acted in Bellman and True, Monk Dawson, Bullshot, The Field, Accused and Chéri.

Tomelty's theatre roles include Elaine Navazio in Last of the Red Hot Lovers by Neil Simon (1979 British premiere directed by Eric Thompson at the Royal Exchange, Manchester); Mia Schuurman in In the Talking Dark by Dolores Walshe (1989) (directed by Braham Murray at the Royal Exchange, Manchester); Kate in Dancing at Lughnasa by Brian Friel (1990) (directed by Patrick Mason at the Abbey Theatre, Dublin); Momma in Doctor Heart by Peter Muller (1991 British premiere directed by Braham Murray at the Royal Exchange, Manchester); and Mrs Alving in Ghosts by Henrik Ibsen (2000) (directed by Braham Murray at the Royal Exchange, Manchester). Tomelty also portrayed Lady Macbeth in the Old Vic's disastrous 1980 production of Macbeth, with Peter O'Toole in the title role.

== Personal life ==
On 1 May 1976, Tomelty married musician Sting, the future lead singer and bassist in the rock band the Police. They met on the set of rock-musical Rock Nativity during a production in Newcastle. She played the Virgin Mary; he played in the band. They have two children together, musician Joe Sumner and director Fuschia Sumner. Tomelty and Sting divorced in 1984 after Sting commenced an affair with actress Trudie Styler; he later married Styler in 1992.
