= Michael Buffong =

English theatre director

- Born: 1964 (age 61–62); Islington, London, England
- Occupation: Theatre director

Michael Buffong (born 1964) is an English theatre director and the Artistic Director of Talawa Theatre Company. His work is characterised by reworking stage classics delivered to high degree of detail. Buffong has been described as "one of the most influential directors of classic plays over the last two decades", in addition to being named one of Creative Review's 50 Creative Leaders. In Spring 2019, Buffong was one of the judges of the Susan Smith Blackburn Prize.

== Career ==
Buffong was born in Islington, London, in 1964. He attended a director's course at Theatre Royal Stratford East and was later appointed an assistant director there. Buffong then went on to work in television and film and his credits include Holby City, EastEnders, Admin, Placebo, Calais Rules, Doctors, Casualty and Comedy Shuffle (BBC), Hollyoaks (Lime Pictures), Feeling It (Eye2Eye) and Blazed (Channel 4). He has also written and directed the award-winning short film Simple! (Acapulco Film Festival).

He has also been particularly associated with the Royal Exchange Theatre in Manchester, where he has directed at least five plays. Buffong also directed Lenny Henry and Lashana Lynch in the Willy Russell play Educating Rita at the Minerva Theatre, Chichester, in 2015.

Buffong has been the artistic director Talawa Theatre Company since 2011. With Talawa, Buffong has most recently directed Guys and Dolls, King Lear, All My Sons, Moon on a Rainbow Shawl, God's Property, The Serpent's Tooth and Passing Wind. Buffong has directed Gurpreet Kaur Bhatti's A Kind of People at Royal Court Theatre and will also direct the Talawa co-production with Park Theatre (London) of Archie Maddocks's A Place for We in early summer 2020.

== Theatre Productions ==
=== Royal Exchange ===
His credits include:

- Six Degrees of Separation by John Guare with Lisa Eichhorn as Ouissa Kittredge, Phillip Bretherton as Flanders Kittredge and O-T Fagbenle (MEN Award) as Paul (May 2004)
- All the Ordinary Angels by Nick Leather (November 2005)
- A Raisin in the Sun by Lorraine Hansberry (MEN Award) with Ray Fearon as Walter Lee Younger, Starletta DuPois (MEN Award) as Lena Younger and Jenny Jules (MEN Award) as Ruth Younger (Feb 2010)
- Private Lives by Noël Coward with Imogen Stubbs as Amanda Prynne, Simon Robson as Elyot Chase, Joanna Page as Sibyl Chase and Clive Hayward as Victor Prynne (Mar 2011)
- All My Sons by Arthur Miller with Don Warrington as Joe Keller, Dona Croll as Kate Keller, Chike Okonkwo as Chris Keller, Kemi-Bo Jacobs as Ann Deever and Simon Coombs as George Deever. (October 2013)
- King Lear. Co-production with Talawa Theatre Company with Don Warrington in the title role. (April 2016)
- Guys and Dolls. Co-production with Talawa Theatre Company with Ray Fearon as Nathan Detroit, Lucay Vandi as Miss Adeleide, Ashley Zhamghazha as Sky Mssterson, and Abiona Omonua as Sarah Brown. (December 2017)
