= Emma Lowndes =

English actress (born 1975)

- Born: 1975 (age 50–51); Irlam, Salford, England
- Years active: 2001–present
- Partner(s): Jason Merrells (2012–present)

Emma Lowndes (born 1975) is an English actress, known for portraying Bella Gregson in Cranford, Mary Rivers in Jane Eyre and Margie Drewe in Downton Abbey.

== Background ==
Brought up in Irlam, near Manchester, Lowndes attended Irlam Primary School and Urmston Grammar School, where she was Head Girl. She studied English at the University of York before training at RADA, graduating in 2000. Her training was partly funded by the Salford Sports and Arts Trust, established by Albert Finney and Harold Riley to assist the city's young talent.

Lowndes is the eldest of three siblings born to Eric and Suzanne Lowndes. She has a younger brother, footballer Nathan Lowndes, and a sister, Katie Lowndes. Lowndes lives in London with her partner, Jason Merrells and their daughter.

== Career ==
Lowndes' television credits include Waking the Dead, Burn It, Afterlife, Doctors, Vera, Silent Witness, Heartbeat, Downton Abbey and Moving On. She also played Mary Rivers in the 2006 BBC adaptation of Jane Eyre and Bella Gregson in Cranford.

Lowndes has appeared in the films All or Nothing (2002), This Little Life (2003), Mother's Milk (2011) and Frozen (2005). She has lent her voice to the radio dramas Whitby Pier, Aperture and Hanging, and played Sarah Badger in the 2001 The Tomorrow People audio drama, The New Gods.

Her theatre work includes Whose Life Is It Anyway?, The Rise and Fall of Little Voice, The Seagull, Port and Cold Meat Party. She has also appeared in productions of Thérèse Raquin, Measure for Measure, Topless Mum and Three More Sleepless Nights. She joined the cast of Harry Potter and the Cursed Child at the Palace Theatre, London from 24 May 2017, playing the role of Ginny Potter.

== Awards ==
Lowndes won Best Actress in a Leading Role at the 2003 Manchester Evening News Theatre Awards for productions of Port and The Seagull at the Royal Exchange Theatre. Her role in The Seagull also earned her a nomination at the 2003 Ian Charleson Awards.

== Filmography ==
=== Television ===
Year	Show	Episode	Role	Notes
2002	Lenny Blue		DC Kerry Allen	Television film
2002	Heartbeat	A Girl's Best Friend (2002)	Teresa	Period crime drama
2003	Burn It		Jane	Drama series
2004	Von Trapped		Leisl 'Lee' Moogan	Television film
2005	The Walk		Gillian	Television film
2005	Waking the Dead	Straw Dog (parts one and two) (2005)	Young Grace Foley	Police procedural
2006	Jane Eyre	Episode 1.4 (2006)	Mary Rivers	Miniseries
2006	Afterlife	A Name Written in Water (2006)	Zoe	Supernatural drama
2007	Cranford	June 1842 (2007); August 1842 (2007); November 1842 (2007); April 1843 (2007)	Bella Gregson	Comedy drama
2008	Doctors	Attack of the Centorts: Part 1 (2008); Attack of the Centorts: Part 2 (2008)	Mia Arnell	Soap opera
2008	The Royal	Blood's Thicker Than Water (2008)	Penny Darnby	Period medical drama
2008	Heartbeat	Missing Persons (2008)	Julie	Period crime drama
2009	Moving On	The Rain Has Stopped (2009)	Alice	Anthology series
2009	Cranford	August 1844 (2009); October to December 1844 (2009)	Bella Gregson	Comedy drama
2009	Paradox	Episode 1.5 (2009)	Julie Hughes	Sci-fi crime drama
2010	Survivors	Episode 2.4 (2010); Episode 2.5 (2010)	Sally	Post-apocalyptic drama
2011	Silent Witness	First Casualty: Parts 1 & 2 (2011)	Claire Lockford	Crime drama
2011	Vera	Little Lazarus	Renagh Salter	Crime drama
2014	Downton Abbey	(Series 5, Downton Abbey series 6)	Mrs Margie Drewe	Period drama
2015	The Musketeers	Emilie (episode 2.4)	Emilie	Drama series
2020	Call the Midwife	Episode 9.1 (2020)	Brenda Donnelly	Period medical drama

2026 Patience// S.2 Episode 8 Nicola// Crime drama

=== Film ===
Year	Film	Role	Notes
2002	All or Nothing	Party Girl	
2003	This Little Life	Nurse Anne	
2005	Frozen	Receptionist	Uncredited
2019	Military Wives	Annie	

== Selected theatre performances ==
- Rachel in Port by Simon Stephens . World premiere directed by Marianne Elliott at the Royal Exchange, Manchester. Lowndes won a MEN Award for her performance. (2002)
- Nina in The Seagull by Anton Chekov. Directed by Greg Hersov at the Royal Exchange, Manchester. Lowndes won a MEN Award for her performance. (2003)
- Nancy in Cold Meat Party by Brad Fraser. World premiere directed by Braham Murray at the Royal Exchange, Manchester. (2003)
- Little Voice in The Rise and Fall of Little Voice by Jim Cartwright. Directed by Sarah Frankcom at the Royal Exchange, Manchester. (2004)
- May in The Accrington Pals by Peter Whelan. Directed by James Dacre at the Royal Exchange, Manchester. (2013).
