= David Horovitch =

English actor (born 1945)

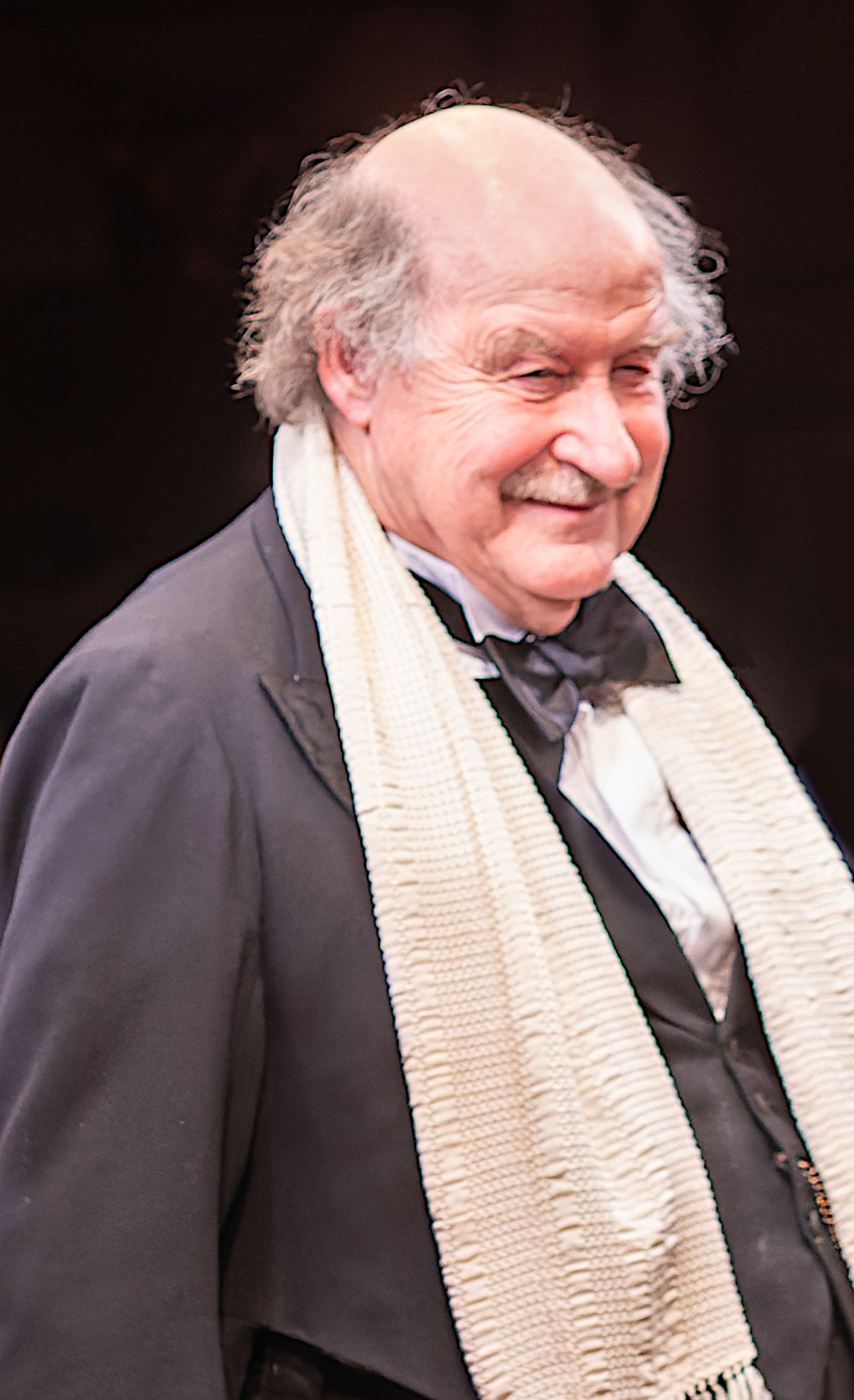
- Horovitch in She Stoops to Conquer 2023
- Born: 11 August 1945 (age 81); London, England
- Education: Central School of Speech and Drama (BA)

David Horovitch (born 11 August 1945) is an English actor, known for playing the character of Inspector Slack in Miss Marple series, and played the title character in Bognor (1981-1982). Other credits include Thriller (1975), The New Avengers (1976), Prince Regent (1979), An Unsuitable Job for a Woman (1982), The Dirty Dozen: The Deadly Mission (1987), Piece of Cake (1988), Bulman (1987), Hold the Back Page (1985-1986), Boon (1989), Love Hurts (1992-1993), Westbeach (1993), Just William (1994-1995), Drop the Dead Donkey (1996), Solomon and Gaenor (1999), 102 Dalmatians (2000), Peak Practice (1999-2001), Foyle's War (2002), The Second Coming (2003), Deceit (2000), Sapphire and Steel (2008), Dad's Army: The Lost Episodes (2019), White House Farm (2020), House of the Dragon (2022) (as Grand Maester Mellos), Bodies (2023), and The Nun II (2023).

== Early life ==
Horovitch was born in London, the son of Alice Mary, a teacher, and Morris Horovitch, a child care worker. He was educated at St Christopher School, a boarding independent school in the town of Letchworth Garden City in Hertfordshire, followed by the Central School of Speech and Drama in London.

Horovitch was born to an atheist Jewish father and a non-Jewish mother; Horovitch was not brought up in the Jewish faith, but started learning about it in his forties, when he was given a string of Jewish roles.

== Career ==
Horovitch has played many roles on popular British TV shows in the past 40 years including: Thriller (1975), Hadleigh (1976), The New Avengers (1976), Prince Regent (1979), Piece of Cake (1988), Bulman (1987), Hold the Back Page (1985-1986), Boon (1989), Love Hurts (1992-1993), Westbeach (1993), Just William (194-1995), Drop the Dead Donkey (1996), Peak Practice (1999-2001), Foyle's War (2002), The Second Coming (2003), Deceit (2000), and A Touch of Frost (2001), as well as starring in the ITV detective show Bognor (1981-1982).

In 1984 he played the role of Detective Inspector Slack for the first BBC Miss Marple adaptation, The Body in the Library. He returned for four Miss Marple Christmas specials (The Murder at the Vicarage, 4:50 from Paddington, They Do It With Mirrors and The Mirror Crack'd from Side to Side). In 1990 he played the role of Commander Daniels in Agatha Christie's Poirot The Kidnapped Prime Minister.

In 2022, he played Grand Maester Mellos in the Game of Thrones prequel series House of the Dragon.

He has also made a number of film appearances, including Sergeant Maskell in An Unsuitable Job for a Woman (1982), a French scientist in The Dirty Dozen: The Deadly Mission (1987), a Yiddish-speaking character in Solomon and Gaenor (1999), Dr. Pavlov in Disney's 102 Dalmatians (2000), and Cardinal Conroy in The Nun II (2023).

In 2008, Horovitch guest-starred in the Sapphire and Steel, audio drama Remember Me. He played Dr. Price in Mike Leigh's 2014 film Mr. Turner.

In 2015, he played George Frideric Handel in All the Angels by Nick Drake at the Sam Wanamaker Playhouse, London. In 2019 he played Corporal-Colonel Square in Dad's Army: The Lost Episodes, a recreation of three missing episodes of the BBC comedy Dad's Army. He starred in White House Farm (2020), Bodies (2023).

In 2023, he played Mr. Hardcastle in She Stoops to Conquer by Oliver Goldsmith at the Orange Tree Theatre, Richmond.

=== Audiobooks ===
Horovitch has also made numerous audiobooks, including Anna Karenina, The Leopard, The Age of Innocence, Fathers and Sons, Alice's Adventures in Wonderland, Through the Looking Glass and What Alice Found There, Nicholas Nickleby, Under Western Eyes, The 2008 production of Jaroslav Hašek's The Good Soldier Švejk, Joseph Conrad's The Secret Agent, and the 2015 production of The Buried Giant by Kazuo Ishiguro.

== Selected theatre performances ==
- The Man Who Came to Dinner at Richmond Theatre (London) (1970).
- The Boys in the Band (play) at the Castle Theatre, Farnham (1971)
- Macbeth at the Castle Theatre, Farnham (1971)
- Love's Labour's Lost at the Nottingham Playhouse (1972)
- The Deep Blue Sea (play) at the Nottingham Playhouse (1972)
- An Inspector Calls at the Mermaid Theatre (1973)
- The Importance of Being Earnest at Greenwich Theatre (1975)
- The Bells (play) at Greenwich Theatre (1976)
- The Merchant of Venice at St. Georges Theatre, Tufnell Park (1977)
- Hamlet at St. Georges Theatre, Tufnell Park (1977)
- The Crucifer of Blood at Theatre Royal Haymarket (1980)
- Willum in The Nerd by Larry Shue, European premiere directed by Braham Murray at the Royal Exchange, Manchester (1982)
- Prospero in The Tempest. Directed by Braham Murray at the Royal Exchange, Manchester (1990)
- Major Barbara by George Bernard Shaw, directed by Greg Hersov at the Royal Exchange, Manchester (Jun 2004)
- George Frideric Handel in All the Angels by Nick Drake at the Sam Wanamaker Playhouse, London (2015)
- Mr. Hardcastle in She Stoops to Conquer by Oliver Goldsmith at the Orange Tree Theatre (2023)
