= Sol B River =

English writer, actor and director

- Born: Leeds, Yorkshire, England
- Occupations: Writer, actor and director
- Notable work: To Rhatid (1996)

Sol B River (born 2 October) is an English writer, director, producer and actor best known for his theatre productions.

== Biography ==
Born in Leeds, Yorkshire, England, of (Jamaican) parentage, he was introduced as Writer in Residence (1994–96) to the West Yorkshire Playhouse, Leeds, by artistic director Jude Kelly after writing Moor Masterpieces as his first commissioned production.

In 1996, River received rave reviews for his first London production To Rhatid, directed by Yvonne Brewster and performed by Angela Wynter, produced by Talawa Theater at the Young Vic Studio Theater.

In 1998, River wrote the Jamaican story The White Witch of Rose Hall and the world premiere was produced in Jamaica as part of the University of the West Indies 50th anniversary at the Philip Sherlock Centre and directed by Brian Heap. The play had failed to receive a production in Britain.

In 1998, River Plays 1, which includes "Moor Masterpieces", "To Rhatid" and "Unbroken", was published by Oberon Books, London, as part of their Modern Playwrights series, making Sol B River the first living black writer to be published by Oberon.

A further collection of River's work was published as River Plays 2 by Oberon Books. in 2000.

His work also includes Unbroken 1998, commissioned by Phoenix Dance Theatre and choreographed by Thea Barnes, a piece that saw dancers perform to spoken word. 48/98, commissioned by Talawa Theatre Company for the Zebra Crossing 2 season, was performed at The Lyric Studio in 1998, directed by Ben Thomas, and was the recipient of the Barclays Extra Performance Award.

In 1998, River directed Brace Yourself, a dance documentary on RJC for Channel 4.

In 1999, he directed the award-winning short film The Bitterest Pill starring Radio 1 DJ Sara Cox.

In 2001, River directed the documentary Glass Ceiling for Channel Four, featuring Treva Etienne, Clarke Peters, Ricco Ross, Rodney Charles and Kolton Lee.

For BBC Radio 4, he has written Making Waves (2000), Walk Against Fear (2000) with James Meredith and Drive On (2002).

In 2003, he wrote and was associate director for Two Tracks & Text Me, West Yorkshire Playhouse.

In 2005–06, he became associate director at the Contact Theatre in Manchester.
