= Andrews Lane Theatre =

Irish theatre and niteclub (1989 to 2014)

Coordinates: 53°20′36″N 6°15′45″W

- Interactive map of Andrews Lane Theatre
- Address: St. Andrew's Lane, Dame Street; Dublin 2 Ireland

Construction
- Opened: August 1989
- Years active: 1989-2014

The Andrews Lane Theatre, later the ALT niteclub, was situated on St. Andrew's Lane, near Dame Street, Dublin. It had two performance areas; an auditorium with 220 seats, and an 80-seat studio. The venue became a niteclub before it became disused, and demolished, and replaced with a hotel.

== Establishment ==
The venue was established by private interests from the business and arts world without state funding. Stage actress Maureen Potter performed the opening ceremoney on 31 August 1989.

== Productions ==
New productions by Irish playwrights in the venue included:

- 'A Country in Our Heads' - Dolores Walshe
- Aceldama - Jimmy Murphy
- An tUisceadán - Nuala Nic Con Iomaire
- Bé Carna - Deirdre Kinahan
- Bimbo - Rosy Barnes
- Buffalo Bill Has Gone To Alaska - Colin Teevan
- Buille an Phíce - Brian Ó Riagáin
- Checking for Squirrels - Eugene O'Brien

== Demise ==
The closure of the space as a theatre was announced in 2007. It became a niteclub and concert venue for the next decade. It was then demolished and replaced with a hotel, including a restaurant "ALT" named after the theatre.
