= Bognor (TV series) =

British TV drama series (1981–1982)

- Genre: Drama crime drama
- Based on: Simon Bognor series by Tim Heald
- Starring: David Horovitch
- Country of origin: United Kingdom
- Original language: English
- No. of series: 2
- No. of episodes: 21

Production
- Running time: 30 minutes
- Production company: Thames

Original release
- Network: ITV
- Release: 10 February 1981 – 23 March 1982

Bognor is a British crime drama television series made by Thames Television for ITV. It was originally shown in 21 episodes (across four serialised stories) between 10 February 1981 and 23 March 1982. It was based on a series of novels by Tim Heald featuring Simon Bognor, an investigator working for the Board of Trade, and starred David Horovitch in the title role.

The first run of stories was shown in February and March 1981, with each story running to six 30-minute episodes. The series was cancelled after only four stories were made. The final story was not broadcast until March 1982, when it was shown in three parts.

== Regular cast ==
- David Horovitch - Simon Bognor
- Joanna McCallum - Monica
- Ewan Roberts - Parkinson
- Tim Meats - Lingard

== Guest cast ==
=== Unbecoming Habits ===
- James Maxwell - Anselm
- Patrick Troughton - Xavier
- Geoffrey Chater - Sir Erris Brig
- Richard Hurndall - Lord Camberley
- Robert Eddison - John
- Charles Lloyd-Pack - Matthew
- Anthony Jackson - Barnabus
- Alec Wallis - George Hey
- Glyn Jones - Sir John Derby
- David Rowlands - Batty Tom
- David Gooderson - Andy
- Edward Peel - Vivian
- John Flint - Insp. Trollope
- Gordon Rollings - Sid
- David Telfer - PC Temple

=== Deadline ===
- Benjamin Whitrow - Eric Gringe
- Charlotte Cornwell - Molly Mortimer
- Robert Addie - Willy Wimbledon
- Peter Jeffrey - Milburn Port
- Richard Vernon - Lord Wharfedale
- Glyn Jones - Sir John Derby
- Frances White - Thelma Gringe
- Shirley Dixon - Parson Woodforde
- Glynis Barber - Secretary
- David Calder - Insp. Flanders
- Annette Badland - Charlotte
- Christopher Biggins - Spencer Nugent
- Geoffrey Bateman - Elliston Gravelle

=== Let Sleeping Dogs Die ===
- Robin Bailey - Percy Pocklington
- Nigel Davenport - Edgar Eagerly
- Joan Greenwood - Duchess of Dorset
- Elizabeth Spriggs - Alisa Potts
- Michael Bilton - Andrew
- Roy Macready - Mervyn Sparks
- Shane Rimmer - Horace Higgins
- Frederick Treves - Brigadier Willoughby
- Victor Winding - Ramble
- Gabriel Woolf - Jorgen Winterfield
- Alfred Molina - Waiter

=== Just Desserts ===
- Andrew Burt - Aubrey Pring
- John Le Mesurier - Blight-Purley
- Lynda Marchal - Lady Aubergine
- Edward de Souza - Pendennis
- Ian Collier - Scoff Smith

== Novels ==
Five of Heald's novels were reissued as tie-ins with the series by Arrow Books in 1981: Unbecoming Habits, Deadline, Let Sleeping Dogs Die, Just Desserts and Blue Blood Will Out. The cancellation of the series meant the fifth novel was never produced for television. Heald continued to write further Bognor novels and they have all been re-issued since without reference to the television series.

== DVD release ==
The series was released on 4 DVDs in the UK (Region 2) by Network DVD in 2011.
