= Downton Abbey series 6 =

Downton Abbey
- Series 6
- No. of episodes: 8 + 1 Christmas special

Release
- Original network: ITV
- Original release: 20 September – 8 November 2015

Series chronology
- ← Previous; Series 5

The sixth and final series of the British historical drama television series Downton Abbey broadcast from 20 September 2015 to 8 November 2015, comprising a total of eight episodes and one Christmas Special episode broadcast on 25 December 2015. The series was broadcast on ITV in the United Kingdom and on PBS in the United States, which supported the production as part of its Masterpiece Classic anthology.

== Cast and characters ==
=== Main cast ===
Upstairs

- Hugh Bonneville as Robert Crawley, Earl of Grantham
- Laura Carmichael as Lady Edith Crawley; later Edith Pelham, Marchioness of Hexham
- Michelle Dockery as Lady Mary Crawley; later Lady Mary Talbot
- Matthew Goode as Mr Henry Talbot
- Harry Hadden-Paton as Mr Bertie Pelham; later Herbert "Bertie" Pelham, Marquess of Hexham (Note: In series 6 only credited with the main cast in "The Finale".)
- Lily James as Lady Rose Aldridge
- Allen Leech as Mr Tom Branson
- Elizabeth McGovern as Cora Crawley, Countess of Grantham
- David Robb as Dr Richard Clarkson
- Maggie Smith as Violet Crawley, Dowager Countess of Grantham
- Penelope Wilton as Mrs Isobel Crawley; later Isobel Grey, Lady Merton

Downstairs

- Jim Carter as Mr Charles Carson; the Butler
- Phyllis Logan as Mrs Elsie Hughes; the Housekeeper
- Brendan Coyle as Mr John Bates; Lord Grantham's valet
- Joanne Froggatt as Mrs Anna Bates; Lady Mary’s maid
- Robert James-Collier as Mr Thomas Barrow; the Under-Butler; later the Butler
- Kevin Doyle as Mr Joseph Molesley; First Footman
- Raquel Cassidy as Miss Phyllis Baxter; Lady Grantham's maid
- Michael Fox as Mr Andrew Parker; Second Footman
- Lesley Nicol as Mrs Beryl Patmore; the cook
- Sophie McShera as Mrs Daisy Mason; the Assistant Cook

=== Recurring and guest cast ===
- Samantha Bond as Lady Rosamund Painswick; Lord Grantham's sister (Recurring)
- Paul Copley as Mr Albert Mason, William Mason's father (Recurring)
- Harriet Walter as Prudence, Dowager Lady Shackleton; Lady Violet's close friend (Recurring)
- Jeremy Swift as Mr Septimus Spratt; Lady Violet's butler (Recurring)
- Sue Johnston as Miss Gladys Denker; Lady Violet's maid (Recurring)
- Douglas Reith as Richard Grey, Lord Merton; Lady Mary's godfather and Isobel's fiancé (Recurring)
- Antonia Bernath as Miss Laura Edmunds; co-editor at the Sketch (Recurring)
- Sebastian Dunn as Mr Charlie Rogers; Mr Talbot's close friend (Recurring)
- Rose Leslie as Mrs Gwen Harding; former housemaid of Downton Abbey (Guest)
- Philip Battley as Mr John Harding; Gwen's husband (Guest)
- Michael Cochrane as the Reverend Albert Travis (Recurring)
- Patricia Hodge as Mrs Mirada Pelham; Bertie Pelham's mother (Guest)
- Brendan Patricks as The Hon. Evelyn Napier; Lady Mary's close friend (Guest)
- Andrew Scarborough as Timothy Drewe; a farmer (Guest)
- Emma Lowndes as Margie Drewe; wife of Tim Drewe (Guest)
- Matt Barber as The Hon. Atticus Aldridge; Lady Rose's husband (Guest)
- Fifi Hart as Miss Sybbie Branson; Lady Sybil and Tom's daughter (Recurring)
- Oliver and Zac Barker as Master George Crawley; Lady Mary and Matthew's son (Recurring)
- Eva and Karina Samms as Miss Marigold Crawley; Lady Edith and Michael's daughter (Recurring)
- Peter Egan as Hugh "Shrimpie" MacClare, Marquess of Flintshire; Lady Rose's father (Guest)
- Howard Ward as Sergeant Willis; a policeman (Recurring)
- Charlie Anson as The Hon. Larry Grey; Lord Merton's elder son (Guest)
- Phoebe Sparrow as Miss Amelia Cruikshank; later The Hon. Mrs Larry Grey; Larry Grey's wife (Recurring)
- Richard Teverson as Dr Ryder; a doctor (Recurring)
- Patrick Brennan as Mr Dawes; headmaster of Downton Village School (Recurring)
- Victoria Emslie as Audrey; Lady Edith's secretary (Recurring)
- Paul Putner as Mr Skinner; former editor at the Sketch (Recurring)
- Hayley Jayne Standing as Lucy Philpotts; Mrs Patmore's niece (Recurring)
- Rick Bacon as Mr Henderson; owner of Mallerton Hall (Guest)
- Nichola Burley as Rita Bevan; Lady Mary's blackmailer (Guest)
- Rupert Frazer as Neville Chamberlain; Minister of Health (Guest)
- Charlotte Hamblin as Lady Anne Acland; Evelyn Napier's dinner guest (Guest)
- Adrian Lukis as Sir John Darnley; Crawley family's friend (Guest)

== Episodes ==
No. overall	No. in series	Title	Directed by	Written by	Original release date	UK viewers (millions)
44	1	"Episode One"	Minkie Spiro	Julian Fellowes	20 September 2015	10.32
April 1925. The larger York County Hospital wants to take over the Downton one; the hospital board is split. Violet objects and Isobel approves, citing new medical treatment and better equipment. Rita Bevan, a former chambermaid at the hotel where Mary and Lord Gillingham stayed, attempts to blackmail Mary for £1,000, or she will expose their tryst. Mary refuses to pay, but Rita confronts Robert, who pays her off with £50 and warns she will be reported to the police if she reveals anything. Sergeant Willis informs Bates and Anna that a woman has confessed to murdering Green, and the case is closed. Anna is upset she may be unable to bear a child. Edith intends to spend more time in London and be more hands-on with the magazine. The family attend an auction at a neighbouring estate which is being sold to pay off debts with Mr Mason losing the tenancy of his farm. The estate's owner says Robert should consider selling Downton before it is too late. Mrs Hughes asks Mrs Patmore to ask Mr Carson if his idea of a "full marriage" includes an expectation of her performing "her wifely duties".
45	2	"Episode Two"	Minkie Spiro	Julian Fellowes	27 September 2015	10.04
April 1925. Mary chides Robert for offering Carson the servants' hall for his and Mrs Hughes' wedding reception, and suggests the upstairs instead; Mrs Hughes insists on a separate venue which better represents who they are, which leads to friction between the couple. Edith argues vehemently with Mr Skinner, the magazine's publisher, who apparently resents working for a woman. Mary takes Anna to a Harley Street doctor who proposes minor surgery during her next pregnancy to prevent another miscarriage. When Mary and Cora take the children with them to inspect the new pigs, Mrs Drewe arrives and dotes on Marigold. Shortly after, at the local livestock competition, Mrs Drewe takes Marigold to the Yew Tree. Mr Drewe persuades her to return Marigold and tells Robert it is best if the Drewes find another tenancy.
46	3	"Episode Three"	Philip John	Julian Fellowes	4 October 2015	10.04
May 1925. Mrs Patmore tells Cora that Mrs Hughes prefers a wedding breakfast venue other than Downton's grand hall. Violet wants Robert to support her position on the hospital merger; things get tense at a hospital board meeting and an annoyed Isobel is rude to Dr Clarkson. Edith dismisses her editor, Mr Skinner, and gets her magazine assembled with Bertie Pelham's help. Anna is pregnant. Daisy hopes that Mr Mason can take over the vacated Yew Tree Farm and mistakenly believes that Cora has already arranged it. Mr Carson and Mrs Hughes are married in the church. During the wedding breakfast at the village school, Tom Branson and daughter Sybbie unexpectedly arrive from Boston. He says Downton is his home and he wants to stay.
47	4	"Episode Four"	Philip John	Julian Fellowes	11 October 2015	10.39
May 1925. Lady Shackleton visits with her nephew, Henry Talbot. Lady Rosamund and Mr and Mrs Harding, who are involved in advancing women's careers, also arrive. Anna recognizes and greets Mrs Harding as Gwen, the former Downton housemaid who left service for a new career. Sergeant Willis asks Baxter to testify against Coyle, the man who coerced her to steal jewellery from a previous employer. Cora persuades Robert and Mary to lease Yew Tree Farm to Mr Mason, which Daisy learns from Robert just as she was about to confront Cora. Lady Mary rushes a pregnant Anna to London where the doctor performs surgery, saving the baby. Bates is delighted to learn that Anna is pregnant. Robert continues to experience stomach pain but dismisses it as indigestion. Mr and Mrs Carson return from their Scarborough honeymoon and move into an estate cottage together. Edith plans to hire a woman editor for her magazine.
48	5	"Episode Five"	Michael Engler	Julian Fellowes	18 October 2015	10.60
May 1925. Mrs Patmore, Daisy and Andy help Mr Mason move into the farm. Andy confesses to Thomas that he is illiterate, and accepts Thomas's offer to teach him in secret. Edith hires Laura Edmunds as her editor, and also becomes romantically involved with Bertie Pelham. Molesley accompanies Baxter to the trial, but she is not called upon to testify as Coyle accepts a plea deal. Violet persuades Minister of Health Neville Chamberlain to attend a dinner at Downton, and during it harangues everyone about the hospital. Robert suddenly vomits blood over the dinner table, collapses, and is rushed to the local hospital. He has a burst ulcer and survives surgery, but Mary tells Tom that the two of them must take over running the estate, as her father must not be stressed further. Mary becomes suspicious about Marigold's birth, after hearing a puzzling exchange about the child between Cora and Violet.
49	6	"Episode Six"	Michael Engler	Julian Fellowes	25 October 2015	10.31
Early June 1925. Carson continues to criticise his wife's housekeeping practices at the cottage as not being up to standard, to her increasing annoyance. He even complains about how she makes the bed, and suggests she get some cooking pointers from Mrs Patmore. The board of Downton Hospital learns that its merger with the Royal Yorkshire Hospital has been approved and Cora has been invited to be the new president, replacing Lady Violet. Mary takes Tom to London, where they meet Henry. Henry tells Mary he is falling in love with her. Mary and Tom open Downton Abbey to the public for a day to raise funds for the hospital. Carson questions Thomas about his meetings with Andy, causing Thomas more distress and reducing him to tears of self-pity.
50	7	"Episode Seven"	David Evans	Julian Fellowes	1 November 2015	10.49
July 1925. Isobel is puzzled to receive an invitation to the wedding of Lord Merton's son, Larry, and Amelia Cruikshank. Mary receives a telephone call from Henry, who implores her to give him an answer regarding his romantic intentions; she says he is not the right man for her. Daisy and Molesley sit for their exams; the latter does so well that the headmaster offers him a teaching job at the school. Henry invites the family to an automobile race at Brooklands. There is a deadly accident, and Henry's friend Charlie Rogers is killed, upsetting both Mary and Henry very deeply. Mrs Carson pretends to have injured her hand, forcing Mr Carson to do the cooking and housekeeping at the cottage. Carson is exhausted and gains a new respect for his wife's efforts. Mrs Patmore's B&B opens with its first guests. Bertie proposes to Edith, who mentions Marigold (though only as 'the family ward') and asks for time to consider. Violet has departed to the south of France and gives Robert a new dog.
51	8	"Episode Eight"	David Evans	Julian Fellowes	8 November 2015	11.15
August 1925. When his cousin Peter dies, Bertie becomes the new Marquess of Hexham. Edith hesitates to tell him that Marigold is her illegitimate daughter. Upset over Henry, Mary spitefully reveals the truth about Marigold at breakfast, and Bertie leaves, hurt that Edith did not trust him. After having a heated row with Mary, Edith goes to London, where she and her editor discover that the magazine's agony aunt, believed to be a female, is in fact Mr Spratt, the Dowager Countess's butler. When it is revealed that the first couple to stay at Mrs Patmore's B&B were adulterers, she finds bookings are being cancelled. Cora and Robert go there for tea, taking a newspaper photographer to record their visit, to show support. Molesley begins teaching part-time at the school. Thomas attempts suicide, but Baxter and Andy save him. Henry calls Mary again, who reveals her fear that Henry will die in a car crash like her late husband, Matthew. Henry is invited back, and Mary agrees to marry him. They marry quickly in the village church. Mary and Edith reconcile.
Special
52	–	"The Finale"	Michael Engler	Julian Fellowes	25 December 2015	11.22
29 September 1925 – 1 January 1926: Carson's hands begin shaking while serving dinner. Thomas secures a job with an elderly couple. Molesley leaves full-time service when the headmaster offers him a teaching position, plus a cottage. Lord Merton tells Isobel he suffers from pernicious anaemia, but still wants to marry her. His manipulative daughter-in-law, Amelia, prevents Isobel from seeing him until an indignant Violet intervenes, and he and Isobel plan to marry. Andy falls for Daisy, who is uninterested, but she gradually grows to like him. Eventually, she decides to live at the farm with Mr Mason, her father-in-law. Mary sets up a meeting between Edith and Bertie where he again proposes to Edith, who accepts. At Brancaster Castle to announce Edith and Bertie's engagement, Edith tells Bertie's mother, Mrs Pelham, the truth about Marigold, impressing her initially sceptical future mother-in-law with her honesty. Henry and Tom go into business together selling cars, and Mary tells Henry she is pregnant. Edith and Bertie are married on New Year's Eve 1925 and leave on their honeymoon. Dr Clarkson informs Lord Merton that he has only a non-fatal form of anaemia. During the wedding reception, Anna goes into labour and gives birth to a son. Carson realises his condition will affect his duties, and tenders his resignation; Robert suggests that Thomas return as butler while Carson retires, retaining an oversight role. Violet graciously accepts Cora's prime position within the family, and in the end, they reconcile.
