= Eileen Essell =

English actress (1922–2015)

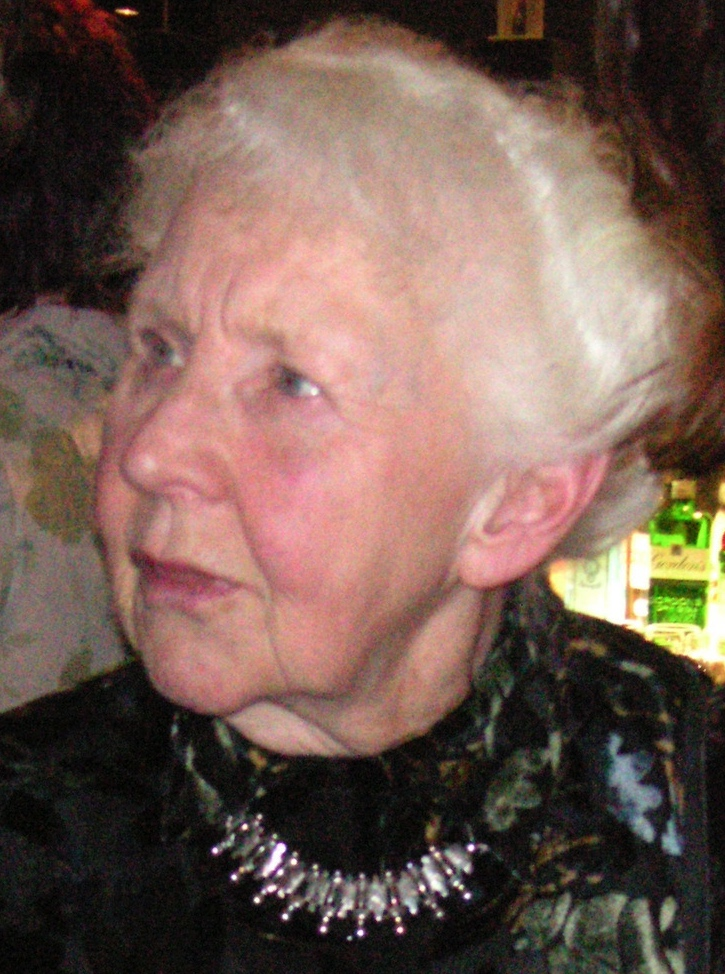
- Essell in 2006
- Born: 8 October 1922; London, England
- Died: 15 February 2015 (aged 92); London, England
- Occupation: Actress
- Years active: c. 1940s–2015
- Spouse: Gerard McLarnon (m. 1958; died 1997)
- Children: 1

Eileen Joan Essell (8 October 1922 – 15 February 2015) was an English actress, noted in part for not beginning her screen acting career until age 79.

== Career ==
Essell retired from stage acting in 1958 following her marriage to playwright and actor Gerard McLarnon. She later earned a living as a teacher at the Central School of Music and Drama and the City University. After the death of her husband in 1997, Christopher Webber (a family friend) lured Essell back on stage to play a leading role in a zarzuela he was directing at London's Bloomsbury Theatre, The Girl with the Roses (1999). Although she had acted onstage in the 1940s/1950s, Essell's first screen performance was in an episode of Doctors. She later appeared in The Bill, Doc Martin, Holby City, Hustle, Casualty, Ideal and Sensitive Skin, among other episodes. Essell guest starred as Christine in the episode "From Out of the Rain" in season 2 of the BBC spin-off show Torchwood. On film, she is best remembered for the role of Mrs. Connelly in Duplex and as Grandma Josephine in Charlie and the Chocolate Factory.

== Death ==
Essell died on 15 February 2015, at age 92.

== Filmography ==
Year	Title	Role	Notes
2002	Ali G Indahouse	Mrs Hugh	
2003	Duplex	Mrs Connelly	Released in the United Kingdom and Ireland as Our House
2004	Finding Neverland	Mrs Snow	
2005	Charlie and the Chocolate Factory	Grandma Josephine	
2005	The Producers	Hold Me-Touch Me	

=== Television ===
Year	Title	Role	Notes
2005	Hustle	Mary	Series 2
2006	Ideal	Mrs Coneybear	Series 2 Episode 4 "The Seance"
2007	Doc Martin	Mrs. Avril	Season 3 Episode 3
2007	Fear, Stress and Anger	Gran	
2008	Torchwood	Christina	
