= Hold the Back Page =

British television series

- Genre: Drama
- Written by: Stan Hey; Andrew Nickolds
- Directed by: Adrian Shergold; Christopher R. Baker
- Starring: David Warner
- Composer: Gordon Giltrap
- Country of origin: United Kingdom
- Original language: English
- No. of series: 1
- No. of episodes: 10

Production
- Producer: Evgeny Gridneff
- Running time: 60 minutes
- Production company: BBC

Original release
- Network: BBC One
- Release: 12 November 1985 – 28 January 1986

Hold the Back Page is a British ten-part television series which originally aired on BBC One between 12 November 1985 and 28 January 1986. A sports reporter transfers from a broadsheet to a tabloid.

== Main cast ==
- David Warner as Ken Wordsworth
- Eric Allan as Reg
- Gil Brailey as Alison
- Lee Whitlock as Charlie Wordsworth
- David Horovitch as Russell de Vries
- Peter-Hugo Daly as Steve Stevens
- Richard Ireson as Frank McNab
- Tilly Vosburgh as Ruby

== Bibliography ==
- Vahimagi, Tise . British Television: An Illustrated Guide. Oxford University Press, 1996.
