= All the Angels =

Play by Nick Drake

All the Angels (full title All the Angels: Handel and the First Messiah) is a 2015 play with music by the British poet Nick Drake treating the 1742 Dublin premiere of Handel's Messiah and the actor-singer Susannah Cibber's involvement in it. Other historical figures such as the work's librettist Charles Jennens, the music historian Charles Burney and the soprano Christina Maria Avoglio also appear. It draws its name from Let all the angels of God worship Him, the chorus of Part II, Scene 4 from Messiah, itself quoting and titled after Hebrews 1:6.

It briefly premiered from 26 June to 6 July 2015 at the Sam Wanamaker Theatre, directed by Jonathan Munby, followed by a longer run at the same venue from 6 December 2016 to 12 February 2017. In both productions Handel was played by David Horovitch, Cibber by Kelly Price and the choric figure of Crazy Crow (Note: "Crazy Crow" was the nickname of one George Hendrick, an eighteenth-century street porter (and body snatcher — in Jonathan Munby's 2015 production the character makes his first appearance on stage emerging from a grave) regularly employed by Dublin musicians.) by Sean Campion, with the music sung by members of Genesis Sixteen, the training programme of the choir The Sixteen.
