= Deirdre Kinahan =

Irish playwright and theatrical producer

- Born: Deirdre Kinahan; 1968 (age 57–58)

Deirdre Kinahan is an Irish playwright and theatre producer. She lives in County Meath with her family.

== Life ==
Deirdre Kinahan was born in Dublin. She joined several drama clubs during her childhood.

She graduated from University College Dublin in 1988, with a Bachelor Degree in English and History.

She and Maureen Collender set up the Tall Tales Theatre Company in Dublin in 1997 and staged several plays before she turned her hand to writing.

She has served as a board member of Theatre Forum Ireland and The Abbey Theatre. She is also literary associate with Meath County Council Arts Office. She is a member of Aosdána, a body of elected Irish artists considered to have made an outstanding contribution to cultural life. Kinahan has collaborated with many major theatres in Ireland and on the International circuit including The Old Vic, Royal Court, Bush Theatre London, MTC, Irish Arts Centre and Studio Theatre US. She writes for the Abbey Theatre, Landmark Productions and Fishamble Theatre Company regularly in Ireland.

== Works ==
=== Plays ===
Include

- Bé Carna. Women of the Flesh (1999) — Andrews Lane Theatre, Tall Tales Theatre co.
- Passage (2001) — Civic Theatre, Tall Tales Theatre co.
- Attaboy, Mr. Synge! (2002) — Civic Theatre, Tall Tales Theatre co.
- Knocknashee (2002) — Civic theatre, Tall Tales Theatre co.
- Melody (2005) — Tall Tales Theatre co.
- Hue and Cry (2007) — Tall Tales Theatre co and Bewleys Cafe Theatre
- Bogboy (2010) — Tall Tales Theatre co
- Moment (2011) — Tall Tales Theatre co and Bush Theatre
- These Halcyon Days (2013) — Tall Tales Theatre co and Landmark Productions
- Spinning (2014) — Fishamble Theatre co
- Rise (2016) — Old Vic
- Rathmines Road (2018) — Fishamble Theatre co and Abbey Theatre
- The Unmanageable Sisters (2018) — Abbey Theatre
- Crossings (2018) — Pentabus Theatre co
- Embargo (2020) — Fishamble Theatre co
- The Visit Draiocht 2021/2
- An Old Song, Half Forgotten (2023) — Abbey Theatre
- The Saviour (2023) - Landmark Productions
- OUTRAGE Fishamble Theatre Co

=== Producer ===
- Passage (Tall Tales Theatre Company, 2001)
- Melody (Tall Tales Theatre Company, 2005)

== Awards ==
- Member, Aosdána
- BBC Northern Ireland 2009
- First Irish NYC, Bogboy
- Edinburgh Fringe First, Halcyon Days 2013
- Tilestyle Bursary 2014
- Peggy Ramsey, 2014
- Helen Hayes DC, Moment
- Dora Awards Canada, Moment
- Jeff Chicago, Spinning
- Helen Hayes DC, Wild Notes (nomination) 2019
- Meath County Council Bursary in 2023
- Nomad Commission Award 2024

== See also ==
- List of Irish writers
