= Braham Murray =

English theatre director (1943–2018)

Braham Sydney Murray, OBE (12 February 1943 – 25 July 2018) was an English theatre director. In 1976, he was one of five founding Artistic Directors of the Royal Exchange Theatre in Manchester, and the longest-serving (he retired in 2012).

== Early years ==
Braham Goldstein was born in north London, the son of Samuel Goldstein. His name became Murray when his mother remarried and Philip Murray became his stepfather. He attended Clifton College, Bristol, at the age of 13 where he acted in The Bespoke Overcoat by Wolf Mankowitz (adapted from a Gogol short story) and directed Ibsen's Brand in school productions. He read English at University College, Oxford, from 1961.

He spent most of his time at university directing, and eventually left Oxford in 1964 without taking his degree. His student productions included The Connection by Jack Gelber, The Hostage by Brendan Behan, A Man for All Seasons by Robert Bolt and Rhinoceros by Eugène Ionesco. Whilst still at Oxford he co-wrote and directed Hang Down Your Head and Die for the ETC (experimental theatre club) at the Oxford Playhouse. It opened on 12 February 1964, later transferring to the Comedy Theatre in London and later still to Broadway.

== Foundation of the Royal Exchange Theatre ==
After leaving Oxford he directed The Winter's Tale at Birmingham Rep with Prunella Scales. Later, in September 1965, he was appointed artistic director of Century Theatre which became the resident company at the University Theatre in Manchester as well as touring the north-west of England using a mobile theatre. In 1967, Michael Elliott and Caspar Wrede agreed to direct productions at the Century Theatre. The following year the three men set up the 69 Theatre Company at the University, where they produced plays until 1972 when the group started to look for a permanent theatre in Manchester.

They were joined by Richard Negri – who was to design the new theatre – and actor James Maxwell, and in 1973 a temporary theatre, The Tent, was installed in the disused Royal Exchange in Manchester. The success of The Tent led to the decision being taken to build the new theatre inside the Royal Exchange. Using the Theatre-in-the-round principles, it became the largest such theatre in the UK. The opening production in September 1976 was The Rivals, directed by Murray. He moved permanently to Manchester at this time, with his wife, designer Joanna Bryant, and their family. She had already designed many of his productions, and would continue to do so at the Royal Exchange.

He continued to be an artistic director of the Company and directed 65 productions. Murray received the OBE in the 2010 New Year Honours for services to drama. In June 2011, he announced that he was to step down as artistic director in 2012.

== Productions ==
His productions include: -

=== Royal Exchange ===
- The Rivals by Richard Brinsley Sheridan. The opening production, with Tom Courtenay, Christopher Gable, James Maxwell and Patricia Routledge (1976)
- What the Butler Saw by Joe Orton, with Lee Montague, Lindsay Duncan and Michael Feast (1977)
- Leaping Ginger by Trevor Peacock. World premiere with Christopher Neil (1977)
- The Dybbuk by S Anski (1978)
- The Winter's Tale with James Maxwell and Helen Ryan (1978)
- The Three Musketeers by Braham Murray and Derek Griffiths. World premiere with Robert Lindsay, Derek Griffiths, Terry Wood and Trevor Peacock (1979)
- The Lower Depths by Maxim Gorky, with Robert Lindsay (1980)
- Blood, Black and Gold by Gerard McLarnon. World premiere with John Watts and Dilys Hamlett (1980)
- Have You Anything to Declare by Maurice Hennequin. British premiere with Brian Cox (1980)
- Waiting for Godot by Samuel Beckett, with Max Wall and Trevor Peacock (1980)
- Measure for Measure with Alfred Burke and Claire Higgins (1981)
- The Beaux' Stratagem by George Farquhar, with Robert Lindsay and Christopher Neame (1982)
- The Nerd by Larry Shue. European premiere with Derek Griffiths and David Horovitch (1982)
- Andy Capp by Alan Price and James Maxwell. World premiere with Tom Courtenay, Alan Price and Michael Mueller (1982)
- The Government Inspector by Nikolai Gogol, with Philip Madoc and Derek Griffiths (1983)
- Hamlet with Robert Lindsay (1983)
- Long Day's Journey into Night by Eugene O'Neill, with James Maxwell and Dilys Hamlett (1985)
- Who's a Lucky Boy by Alan Price, with Michael Mueller and Adrian Dunbar (1985)
- Riddley Walker by Russell Hoban. World Premiere with David Threlfall (1986)
- Court in the Act by Maurice Hennequin. British premiere with Michael Denison, Lee Montague and Gabrielle Drake (1986)
- The Merchant of Venice with Harriet Walter (1987)
- The Bluebird of Unhappiness by Woody Allen, with Derek Griffiths, Trevor Peacock, Haydn Gwynne and John Bennett (1987)
- The Cabinet Minister by Arthur Wing Pinero, with Frank Thornton, Susan Fleetwood, Haydn Gwynne and David Morrissey (1988)
- Twelfth Night with Tim McInnerny, Saskia Reeves and Derek Griffiths (1988)
- Macbeth with David Threlfall and Frances Barber (1988)
- In the Talking Dark by Dolores Walshe, with Terence Wilton and Frances Tomelty (1989)
- The Tempest with David Horovitch and Emily Raymond (1990)
- Your Home in the West by Rod Wooden, with David Threlfall, Lorraine Ashbourne and Andy Serkis (1991)
- Doctor Heart by Peter Muller, with Andy Serkis, Frances Tomelty and Lorraine Ashbourne (1991)
- The Miser by Moliere, with Tom Courtenay (1992)
- The Recruiting Officer by George Farquhar, with Derek Griffiths, Greg Wise and Haydn Gwynne (1992)
- The Odd Women by Michael Meyer, with Sean Arnold and Lorraine Ashbourne (1992)
- The Brothers Karamazov adapted by Gerard McLarnon. World premiere with Philip Madoc, Lorraine Ashbourne and Michael Mueller (1993)
- Maybe by Mikhail Shatrov. World premiere with Vanessa Redgrave and John Bennett (1993)
- Smoke by Rod Wooden. World premiere with Rade Serbedzija (1993)
- The Count of Monte Cristo adapted by James Maxwell and Jonathon Hackett. World premiere with David Threlfall and Colin Prockter (1994)
- Unidentified Human Remains and the True Nature of Love by Brad Fraser, with Andy Serkis (1995)
- Private Lives by Noël Coward, with Sian Thomas and Pip Donaghy (1995)
- Miss Julie by August Strindberg, with Amanda Donohoe, Patrick O'Kane and Marie Francis (1995)
- The Rivals by Richard Brinsley Sheridan, with Maureen Lipman and Tony Britton (1996)
- Lady Windermere's Fan by Oscar Wilde, with Gabrielle Drake (1997)
- The Candidate by Paul Godfrey, with James Saxton and Colin Prockter (1997)
- Peer Gynt by Henrik Ibsen, with David Threlfall (1999)
- Bats by Braham Murray and Emil Wolk, with Ben Keaton and Emil Wolk (2000)
- Snapshots by Fiona Padfield. World premiere directed by Braham Murray and Sarah Frankcom with Terence Wilton (2000)
- The Ghost Train Tattoo by Simon Robson. World premiere directed by Braham Murray and Sarah Frankcom with Terence Wilton, Joanna David and Gabrielle Drake (2000)
- Ghosts by Henrik Ibsen, with Frances Tomelty and David Horovitch (2000)
- Snake in Fridge by Brad Fraser (MEN Award), with Adam Sims (MEN Award) and Kellie Bright (2000)
- Loot by Joe Orton, with Derek Griffiths, Gabrielle Drake and Colin Prockter (2001)
- Hedda Gabler by Henrik Ibsen, with Amanda Donohoe (MEN Award), Terence Wilton and Simon Robson (2001)
- Time and the Conways by J. B. Priestley, with Gabrielle Drake, Rachel Pickup (MEN Award) and Naomi Frederick (MEN Award) (2002)
- Othello with Paterson Joseph, Emma Darwall Smith and Andy Serkis (2002)
- Cold Meat Party by Brad Fraser. World premiere with Emma Lowndes, Kellie Bright, Helen Atkinson Wood, Geraldine Alexander and Joseph Millson (2003)
- Hobson's Choice by Harold Brighouse, with Trevor Peacock, John Thomson and Joanna Riding (2003)
- The Happiest Days of Your Life by John Dighton, with Janet Henfrey, Simon Robson, Joanna Riding and Philip Madoc (2003)
- The Importance of Being Earnest by Oscar Wilde, with Gabrielle Drake, Jamie de Courcey, Ian Shaw, Laura Rees and Joanna David (2004)
- Antony and Cleopatra with Josette Bushell-Mingo, Tom Mannion and Terence Wilton (2005)
- What Every Woman Knows by J. M. Barrie, with Jenny Ogilvie, Gabrielle Drake and Mark Arends (2006)
- She Stoops to Conquer by Oliver Goldsmith, with Desmond Barrit, Polly Hemingway, Milo Twomey and Jack Tarlton (2006)
- The Triumph of Love by Marivaux, with Brigit Forsyth, Charlie Anson and Rae Hendrie (2007)
- An Ideal Husband by Oscar Wilde, with Joanna Riding, Simon Robson and Milo Twomey (2008)
- The Glass Menagerie by Tennessee Williams, with Brenda Blethyn (TMA Award) (2008)
- True Love Lies by Brad Fraser, with Johnny Phillips, John Kirk and Teresa Banham (2009)
- Haunted by Edna O'Brien, with Brenda Blethyn, Beth Cooke and Niall Buggy (2009)
- Charley's Aunt by Brandon Thomas, with Oliver Gomm and Malcom Rennie (2010)
- The Bacchae by Euripides (2010)
- 5@50 by Brad Fraser, with Teresa Banham, Barbara Barnes, Candida Gubbins, Ingrid Lacey and Jan Ravens(2011)
- Wonderful Town by Leonard Bernstein. Produced in partnership with the Hallé Orchestra and The Lowry with Connie Fisher, Lucy van Gasse, Michael Xavier, Nic Greenshields and Tiffany Graves. The orchestra was conducted by Mark Elder. The production was the last one directed by Murray as artistic director of the Royal Exchange (2012).

=== Other theatres ===
- Hang Down Your Head and Die at the Oxford Playhouse (1964)
- The Winter's Tale at the Birmingham Rep, with Prunella Scales (1965)
- Loot by Joe Orton, at the Century Theatre, Manchester, with Julian Chagrin (1966)
- Long Day's Journey into Night by Eugene O'Neill, at the Century Theatre, Manchester, with Dilys Hamlett, Derek Fowlds and Helen Mirren (1965)
- The Ortolan by Michael Meyer, at the Century Theatre, Manchester, with Dilys Hamlett, Derek Fowlds and Helen Mirren (1965)
- Charley's Aunt by Brandon Thomas, at the Century Theatre, Manchester, with Tom Courtenay and Helen Mirren (1967)
- The Merchant of Venice at the Century Theatre, Manchester, with Dilys Hamlett, James Maxwell and Helen Mirren (1967)
- She Stoops to Conquer by Oliver Goldsmith, at the 69 Theatre Company, with Tom Courtenay, Trevor Peacock and Juliet Mills (1969)
- A Midsummer Night's Dream at the 69 Theatre Company, Manchester, with Brian Cox and Zoë Wanamaker (1970)
- Catch My Soul by Jack Good, at the 69 Theatre Company, Manchester, with Jack Good, P. J. Proby and P. P. Arnold (1971)
- Catch My Soul by Jack Good, for 69 Theatre at the Prince of Wales Theatre, London, with Lance LeGault, Lon Satton and Sylvia McNeill (1971)
- Mary Rose by J. M. Barrie, at the 69 Theatre Company, Manchester, with Mia Farrow (1972)
- Time and the Conways by J. B. Priestley, at the 69 Theatre Company, Manchester, with Dilys Hamlett and Christopher Gable (1973)
- The Good Companions by Ronald Harwood and André Previn, at Her Majesty's Theatre, with Judi Dench, John Mills and Christopher Gable (1974)
- The Black Mikado, adapted from The Mikado by Gilbert and Sullivan, at the Cambridge Theatre, with Michael Denison, Patti Boulaye, Derek Griffiths and Floella Benjamin (1975)
- Shoenberg in Hollywood at the Boston Lyric Opera (2018)

== Bibliography ==
- Murray, Braham (2007). The Worst It Can Be Is a Disaster. London: Methuen Drama. ISBN 978-0-7136-8490-2.
- The Royal Exchange Theatre Company Words & Pictures 1976 – 1998. The Royal Exchange Theatre Company Limited. 1998. ISBN 0-9512017-1-9.
- What You Will: An Inner Journey with Shakespeare. White Crow Books. 2018. ISBN 978-1-78677-052-3.
