= Alex Finlayson =

American playwright

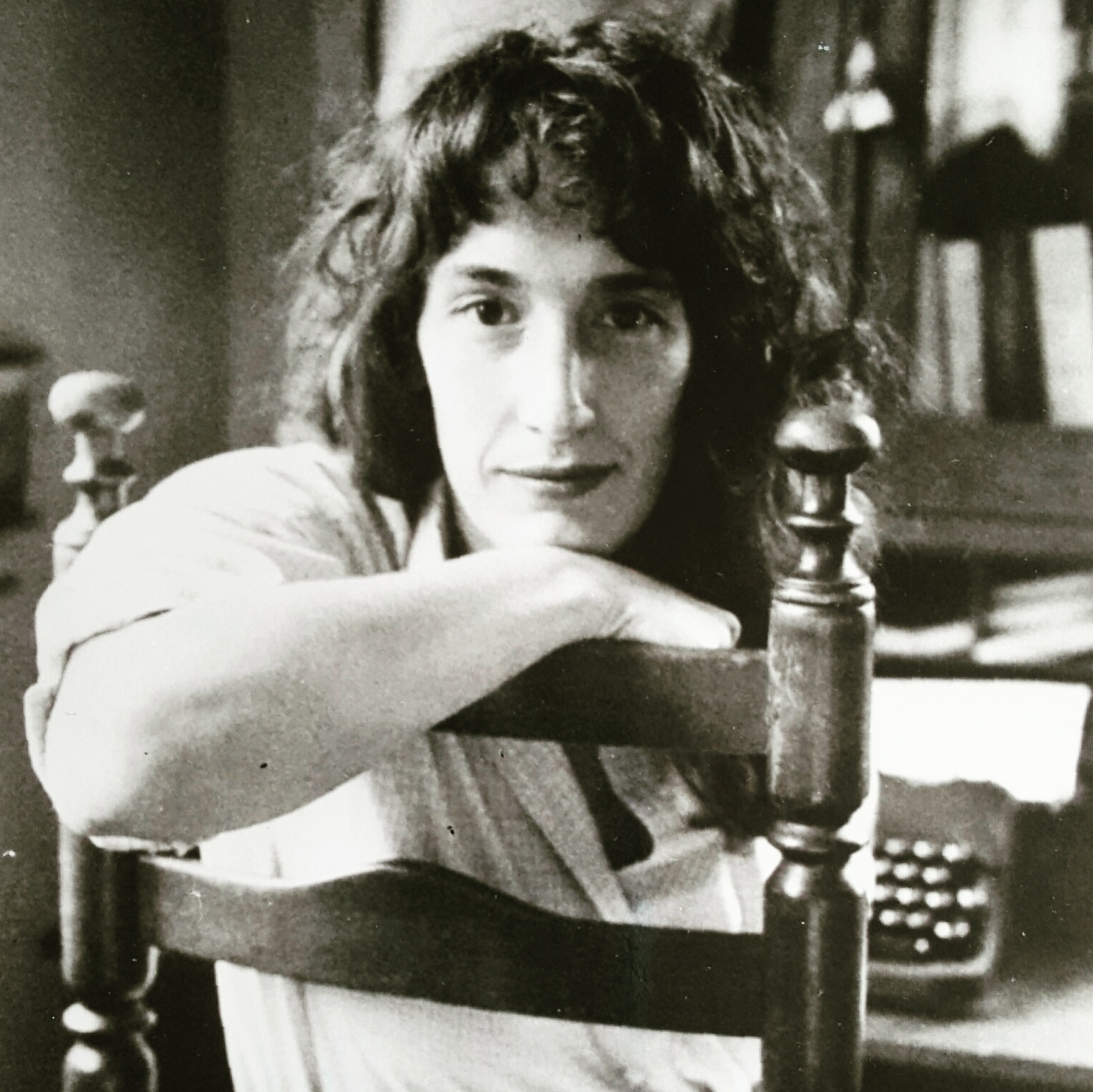
- Alex Finlayson, 1983
- Born: 1951 (age 74–75); Tyler, Texas, United States
- Occupation: Playwright

Alex Finlayson was an American playwright whose work found more success on the English stage than in the United States. After winning a Mobil Oil International Playwriting Prize, Winding the Ball was produced by The Royal Exchange Theatre, Manchester, which also commissioned and produced Finlayson's Misfits (1996) and Tobaccoland (1999). All three plays starred American stage and film actress Lisa Eichhorn and were directed by Greg Hersov.

Finlayson's play, Misfits, was inspired by Arthur Miller's autobiography, Timebends, specifically his account of the 1961 film The Misfits as a "valentine" for his wife Marilyn Monroe. Misfits portrays the film's historic box office and artistic failure as the fault of screenwriter Miller, director John Huston, and producer Frank Taylor, and not its star, Marilyn Monroe, who is most often blamed for the film disaster. Misfits received mixed reviews, with some critics attacking Finlayson for daring to put Miller onstage as a character. However, The Times proclaimed the play "riveting" and "inventive." (Arthur Miller's last play, Finishing the Picture, would present his version of Marilyn Monroe and the making of The Misfits (film) eleven years after Finlayson’s Misfits had debuted and been challenged by his lawyers.

Alex Finlayson was born and grew up in East Texas the daughter of an actor. She was an early protege of Julia Miles and the Women's Project. Her first play, Ladies' Side, was produced by the Source Theatre, Washington, D.C., and received a Helen Hayes nomination for Best New Play. Another early play World of Beauty won the Texas Playwrights Festival (1988) at Stages Repertory Theatre, Houston during producer Ted Swindley’s tenure as Artistic Director. Three of Finlayson's plays were published by Oberon Books.

== Produced Work ==
- Ladies Side - Source Theatre Company, Washington D.C.(1985)
- Last Piece of Flat Land - Zachary Scott Theater, Austin TX (1985)
- World of Beauty - Stages Repertory Theater, Houston TX (1987
- Winding the Ball - Royal Exchange Theatre, Manchester England with David Schofield (1989) / Burning Coal Theater, Raleigh NC (1999)
- Love and Adultery - Studio Theater, Richmond VA with Kathryn Harrold (1989)
- Misfits - Royal Exchange Theatre, Manchester England (1996) / Barksdale Theatre, Richmond VA (2001) / Black Dahlia Theatre, Los Angeles CA directed by Matt Shakman (2005)
- Tobaccoland - Royal Exchange Theatre, Manchester, England (1999)
- Why Men Hate Women - The Orchard Theatre, Ararat VA (2002)

== Media ==
- Triangle Regional Playwrights: A Brief History by Byron Woods
- Misfits explores Myth of Marilyn Monroe in Courageous Fashion, Style Weekly
- Don't Mess with Arthur Miller, Chicago Reader
- Misfits review, Financial Times
- Tobaccoland review, The Guardian
- Helen Hayes Awards
- North Carolina Artists Grant Award
