= Studiobühne Köln =

Theatre in Cologne, Germany

Coordinates: 50°55′29″N 6°55′51″E

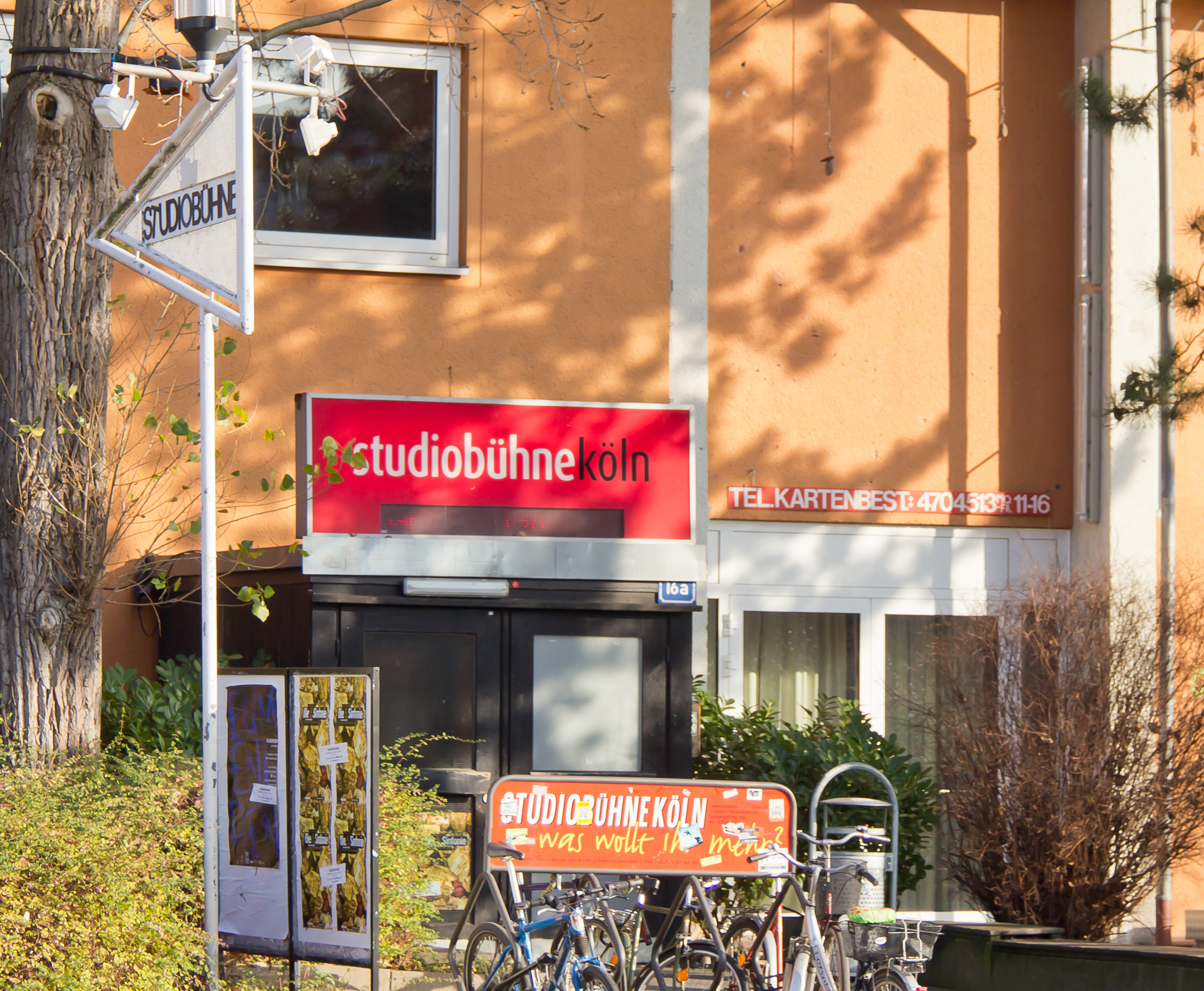
Entrance of the Studiobühne Köln

Studiobühne Köln is a theatre in Cologne, North Rhine-Westphalia, Germany. It was established in 1920 by the University of Cologne, who still supports the institution, making it one of the oldest university-run theatres in Germany.
