= Yvonne Brewster =

Jamaican actress and theatre director (1938–2025)

Yvonne Brewster OBE
- Born: Elsie Yvonne Clarke; 7 October 1938; Kingston, Jamaica
- Died: 12 October 2025 (aged 87); Florence, Italy
- Education: Rose Bruford College; Royal Academy of Music
- Occupations: Actress; theatre director; writer
- Known for: Co-founder of Talawa Theatre Company
- Spouse: Starr Brewster

Elsie Yvonne Brewster OBE (née Clarke; 7 October 1938 – 12 October 2025) was a Jamaican actress, theatre director, producer and writer working across film, theatre, radio and television. She has been described as a "cultural visionary who helped shape modern Caribbean theatre". In 1956, she went to England to study drama at Rose Bruford College, as the UK's first Black woman drama student. On returning to Jamaica in 1965, she co-founded with Trevor Rhone Jamaica's first professional theatre company, the Barn, before returning in the early 1970s to the UK, where she co-founded Talawa Theatre Company, the first production of which was The Black Jacobins by C. L. R. James.

Brewster also directed other international productions, among them Nanny of the Maroons in New York, The Importance of Being Earnest in Ireland, and The Lover in Florence, Italy.

In 1993, Brewster was appointed an Officer of the Order of the British Empire (OBE), and she received other honours including the Woman of Achievement Award from the Arts Council of Great Britain, as well as being elected a Fellow of the Royal Society of Arts and of the Central School of Speech and Drama.

== Early life ==
Born in Kingston, Jamaica, on 7 October 1938, to an upper-middle-class family who ran a funeral business, Brewster attended St Hilda's girls' school in St Ann. She said she was inspired to become an actress at the age of 16, when her father took her to the Ward Theatre "to see a French play, called Huis Clos, written by Jean Paul Sartre. And in it was Mona Chin, who I thought looked just like me. She was fantastic. I looked at this woman and I said, 'Hey, Daddy, I want to be like her.'"

In 1956, Brewster went to the UK to study drama at Rose Bruford College – where she was the UK's first Black woman drama student, being told on her first day that she was unlikely to find theatrical work in Britain – and also attended the Royal Academy of Music, receiving a distinction in drama and mime. She was a pupil of Marcel Marceau.

== Career ==
Brewster returned to Jamaica to teach drama and in 1965, she co-founded (with Trevor Rhone) the Barn in Kingston, Jamaica's first professional theatre company. Brewster noted that the aim of the theatre was to "provide, encourage and promote work that was worthwhile, serious and principled".

Upon her return to England in the early 1970s, she worked extensively in film, radio, television, and directing stage productions, among them The Harder They Come, Smile Orange and The Marijuana Affair, and for BBC TV Maybury, The Fight Against Slavery and My Father Sun Sun Johnson.

In the early 1980s, she co-founded with Anton Phillips Carib Theatre Company, among the aims of which was "to bring the value of multiculturalism to Britain in the form of plays written, directed and starring black people."

Between 1982 and 1984, Brewster was Drama Officer at the Arts Council of Great Britain.

In 1985, she directed a production of Lorraine Hansberry's play A Raisin in the Sun for the Black Theatre Co-operative, performed at the Tricycle Theatre (11 April 1985 – 4 May 1985) and at The Drill Hall Arts Centre (9 July 1985 – 20 July 1985), with the cast featuring Carmen Munroe, Gary McDonald, Peter Harding, Jacqueline de Peza, Freddie Brooks, Guy Gregory, Ella Wilder and Kwabena Manso.

In 1986, she co-founded Talawa Theatre Company with Mona Hammond, Carmen Munroe and Inigo Espejel, using funding from the Greater London Council, then led by Ken Livingstone. In 2021, she said: "In those days there were a lot of black theatre companies, but nobody [was] getting any money.... The work was very experimental and very good in many cases, but it was really, really, really fringe … But I'm not going to be faffing around the edges of the fringe. ...if you call me a fringe, that means I'm something you could cut off … you're not going to fringe me".

Brewster was Talawa's artistic director until 2003, directing Talawa's first production: C. L. R. James's play The Black Jacobins in 1986 at the Riverside Studios, with Norman Beaton in the principal role of Toussaint L'Ouverture. The play had not been performed in England for 50 years, and never before with an all-black cast. The production was a great success, and generated profits enabling Talawa to continue and eventually become Britain's longest-running black theatre company (among those whom Brewster credited for this accomplishment are choreographer Greta Mendez, designer Ellen Cairns, production manager Dennis Charles and actor Ben Thomas). Another landmark came in 1991, when Brewster directed the first all-black production of William Shakespeare`s Antony and Cleopatra, starring Doña Croll and Jeffery Kissoon. In 1996, Brewster created the Zebra Crossing 1 season at the Young Vic directing Sol B River's To Rahtid. In 1998, Brewster produced the Zebra Crossing 2 season at the Lyric Studio Hammersmith, giving a further opportunity to an explosion of Black British talent.

From 2000 to 2001, Brewster portrayed Ruth Harding on the BBC television soap opera Doctors. Her character, a nurse, departed from the series unexpectedly after Brewster suffered a heart illness in real life.

Brewster was a co-founder and trustee of the Alfred Fagon Award for new plays by black British playwrights, named in honour of poet and playwright Alfred Fagon (1937–1986).

Brewster was also a patron of the Clive Barker Centre for Theatrical Innovation.

== Writings ==
In 2004, Brewster published her memoirs, entitled The Undertaker's Daughter: The Colourful Life of a Theatre Director (Arcadia Books).

Her writings made notable contributions to the history of black theatre, and she additionally edited five collections of plays, including Black Plays (Methuen Publishing, 1987, ISBN 978-0413157102), Barry Reckord's For the Reckord (Oberon Books, 2010) and Mixed Company: Three Early Jamaican Plays, published by Oberon Books in 2012.

In 2018, Peepal Tree Press published her book Vaulting Ambition: Jamaica's Barn Theatre 1966–2005.

== Personal life and death ==
Brewster married after returning to England from Jamaica in 1971, and she and her husband retired to live in Florence, Italy.

She featured on BBC Radio 4's Desert Island Discs in 2005, when her chosen book was a primer to learn Italian, her favourite track was "Many Rivers to Cross" by Jimmy Cliff, and her luxury item was olive oil.

Brewster died in Florence on 12 October 2025, five days after her 87th birthday. According to her husband, Starr Brewster, she had been ill for some time.

== Awards and recognition ==
In the 1993 New Year Honours, Brewster was appointed an Officer of the Order of the British Empire (OBE) for services to the arts. In 2001, she was granted an honorary doctorate from the Open University.

In 1996, she was given a Children's BAFTA award for directing a BBC television children's production of Romeo and Juliet.

Brewster received a living legend award from the National Black Theatre Festival in 2001. She then featured on the 2003 list of 100 Great Black Britons.

In 2005, the University of London's Central School of Speech and Drama conferred an honorary fellowship on Brewster in acknowledgement of her involvement in the development of British theatre. In 2013, she was named one of the BBC's 100 Women.

== Selected bibliography ==
- The Undertaker's Daughter: The Colourful Life of a Theatre Director (BlackAmber/Arcadia Books, 2004, ISBN 978-1901969245)
- Vaulting Ambition: Jamaica’s Barn Theatre 1965–2005 (Peepal Tree Press, 2017, ISBN 9781845233600)
