= Nick Drake (poet) =

British poet

Nick Drake (born 1961) is a British poet, playwright, screenwriter, librettist, and novelist.

== Early life and education ==
Nick Drake was born near London, England, in 1961. His father was from Prague, Czechoslovakia, and his mother from Northampton.

He first went to school in Cookham, Berkshire, and then St Albans Grammar School. He attended Magdalene College, Cambridge.

== Career ==
Drake has been Literary Associate at the National Theatre, then Literary Manager at the Bush Theatre in Shepherd's Bush, and then Head of Development at Intermedia Films.

He has also taught creative writing at the Arvon Foundation and Goldsmiths' College.

Drake became a full-time freelance writer in 2002.

=== Writing ===
His first published poetry collection was a pamphlet Chocolate and Salt (Mandeville Press 1990). It earned a Society of Authors/Eric Gregory Award. It was followed by The Man in the White Suit (Bloodaxe Books 1999) which won the Forward Prize for Best First Collection. It included 'The Foley Artist' which won second prize in the Cardiff International Poetry Competition 1996. From the Word Go (2007) included a sonnet sequence in memory of his Czech father, and ‘Live Air’ about his name-sharing with the singer-songwriter Nick Drake. "The Farewell Glacier" published in 2012, was a book-length poem conceived in response to his participation in Cape Farewell's 2010 Arctic Expedition to Svalbard to witness and respond to climate change. The poems were recorded by United Visual Artists as the soundtrack for High Arctic, an installation at the National Maritime Museum in 2011. Drake adapted the collection as a performance piece for COP 26, with Peter Mullan and original music by Emma Donald and Isbel Pendelbury. In 2024 Drake further adapted and extended the collection as a BBC Radio 3 drama of the same name. Starring Adjoa Andoh and Peter Mullan, it included testimony from Inuit activist Siila Watt-Cloutier. Out of Range (Bloodaxe, 2018) continued his exploration of the “signs, wonders and alarms” of the early 21st century. His poems include “The Future” recorded by Andrew Scott for Culture Declares Emergency and Letters to the Earth, "From The Song Dynasty" and "Static".

His screenwriting credits include One Life (2023), co-written with Lucinda Coxon, starring Anthony Hopkins, Helena Bonham Carter and Johnny Flynn, adapted from If It's Not Impossible, the biography of Sir Nicholas Winton by his daughter Barbara Winton. He wrote the screenplay for the Australian film based on philosopher Raimond Gaita's autobiography, Romulus, My Father, which starred Eric Bana as Gaita's father and Kodi Smit-McFee as the young Gaita. It won Best Film at the AFI Awards and was shortlisted for Best Adapted Screenplay. He adapted the first part of Making Noise Quietly from Robert Holman's play for Dominic Dromgoole's 2019 film.

Drake has written for the stage. His "choral play", All the Angels, about the first performance of Handel's Messiah in Dublin, ran at the Sam Wanamaker Theatre in 2015 and 2016, and was revived at Smock Alley Theatre Dublin in 2021 by Rough Magic. The text was published by Faber and Faber in 2016. Other stage plays include Angel (Salisbury Playhouse/Bristol Old Vic), an adaptation of Lope de Vega's Peribanez at Cambridge Arts Theatre (1999), Success (National Theatre Connections 2009), To Reach the Clouds adapted Philippe Petit's 2002 memoir of his high wire walk between the Twin Towers for Nottingham Playhouse in 2006.

He has written the libretti for two operas created with composer Tansy Davies: Between Worlds (2015) for English National Opera, directed by Deborah Warner at the Barbican (the libretto was published by Faber), and Cave (2018), directed by Lucy Bailey for London Sinfonietta, with Mark Padmore and Elaine Mitchener.

He has collaborated with composer Rachel Portman on Earth Song (2019) commissioned by BBC Radio 3, including quotations from Greta Thunberg, and Tipping Points (2023) with violinist Niklas Liepe, a work of six poems on the climate emergency and six corresponding musical movements.

== Work ==
=== Rahotep novels ===
1. Nefertiti: The Book of the Dead 2007
2. Tutankhamun: The Book of Shadows 2010
3. Egypt: The Book of Chaos 2011

=== Poetry collections ===
- The Man in the White Suit 1999
- From the Word Go 2007
- The Farewell Glacier 2012
- Out of Range 2018
- Chocolate and Salt 1990

=== Film and TV ===
- Romulus My Father
- Making Noise Quietly
- One Life

=== Stage Plays ===
- All The Angels
- Success
- To Walk the Clouds
- Stasiland
- New version of Lope de Vega's Peribanez and the Comendador of Ocana

=== Opera Libretti ===
- Tansy Davies Between Worlds
- Tansy Davies Cave

=== Words for Music ===
- Rachel Portman Earth Song
- Rachel Portman Tipping Points
- Tansy Davies The Ice Core Sample Says
- Tansy Davies This Love
- Tansy Davies Static

=== Radio ===
- The Farewell Glacier
- Angel / Mr Sweet Talk
