= Gerard McLarnon =

Gerard McLarnon (16 April 1915 – 16 August 1997) was an English-Irish actor and playwright. Born in Clitheroe, Lancashire, England, he was raised in Northern Ireland. His plays have been performed throughout the world, including Ireland, the United Kingdom, Denmark and Australia. McLarnon collaborated with John Tavener, Tyrone Guthrie, and Laurence Olivier, among others. He had a long-standing creative relationship with theatre director Braham Murray, who directed all his work from 1967 to 1993 at the Century Theatre, the 69 Theatre Company and then the Royal Exchange in Manchester. McLarnon was married to actress Eileen Essell, an the couple married in 1958. They had a son, Fergus.

== Play list ==
- Unhallowed
- The Wrestler's Honeymoon (1953)
- The Bonefire (1958)
- The Rise and Fall of Sammy Posnett (1964)
- The Saviour (1967) directed by Braham Murray
- The Trial of Joan of Arc (1969) directed by Braham Murray
- Blood, Black And Gold (1980) directed by Braham Murray with Clare Higgins in the lead role at the Royal Exchange Theatre, Manchester
- Quartet From The Idiot (1991)adapted from the novel by Fyodor Dostoyevsky, directed by Braham Murray at the Royal Exchange Theatre, Manchester
- The Brothers Karamazov (1993)adapted from the novel by Fyodor Dostoyevsky, directed by Braham Murray at the Royal Exchange Theatre, Manchester
- Victory Morning (mid 1990s) at the Bridewell Theatre, London
