= Dolores Walshe =

Irish writer and dramatist

- Born: 1949 (age 76–77); Dublin

Dolores Walshe (born 1949) is an Irish short story writer, novelist and playwright.

== Biography ==
Dolores Walshe was born in Dublin and grew up in the Liberties in the inner city. She graduated with a degree in Arts from University College Dublin and then got a Higher Diploma from Trinity College, Dublin.

She has won grants, bursaries and awards for her story- and play-writing. Walshe was awarded a second Arts Council Bursary in Literature 2014. She has won a number of fiction awards including the Bryan MacMahon Short Story Award in 2012 and the James Joyce Jerusalem Bloomsday Award. She has come 2nd in the Francis MacManus Award twice. In 2017 she won the Berlin Writing Prize. Walshe has also won a number of awards as a playwright, such as the Listowel Writers’ Week Play Award and Irish Stage and Screen Award. In 1987 she won the OZ Whitehead/Society of Irish Playwrights/PEN Playwriting Literary Prize. Walshe was also winner of the 1991 Irish Stage and Screen Playwriting Competition.

Walshe's plays have been produced by The Royal Exchange in Manchester and the Andrews Lane Theatre in Dublin, and she has been published by Carysfort Press, UCD, and others.

Her work deals with themes including race, feminism and poverty.

She currently lives in Carrick-on-Shannon, Leitrim.

== Bibliography ==
- A Country in Our Heads
- In the Talking Dark
- Moon Mad, 1993
- Where the Trees Weep, 1992
