= Simon Robson =

British actor, director and writer

Simon Robson is a British actor, director and writer.

== Career ==
As an actor, he has appeared in Doctors, Tom & Viv, Trial & Retribution and EastEnders, playing Graham Stone.

Simon Robson studied Philosophy and Social and Political Science at Cambridge University and trained as an actor at RADA. He has worked extensively in the theatre, as well as appearing in Eastenders and Doctors.

His first play, The Ghost Train Tattoo, was premiered at the Royal Exchange Theatre in Manchester in 2001.

Since then he has published a book of short stories, The Separate Heart (Jonathan Cape), which was shortlisted for the prestigious Frank O'Connor International Short Story Award in 2007. His first novel, Catch, was published in 2010. He wrote the libretto for the opera Schoenberg in Hollywood, with music by Tod Machover, which received its premiere with the Boston Lyric Opera in November 2018 and has been revived several times, including at the Vienna Volksoper. He is currently working on another opera with Tod Machover, for Boston, an adaptation of Richard Powers' Pulitzer Prize winning novel, The Overstory, which will receive its premiere in 2028.

== Selected theatre performances ==
- Lord Darlington in Lady Windermere's Fan by Oscar Wilde. Directed by Braham Murray at the Royal Exchange, Manchester. (1997)
- Count Almaviva in The Marriage of Figaro by Beaumarchais. Directed by Helena Kaut-Howson at the Royal Exchange, Manchester. (2002)
- Rupert Billings in The Happiest Days of Your Life by John Dighton. Directed by Braham Murray at the Royal Exchange, Manchester. (2003)
- Chiltern in An Ideal Husband by Oscar Wilde. Directed by Braham Murray at the Royal Exchange, Manchester. (2008)
- Elyot Chase in Private Lives by Noël Coward. Directed by Michael Buffong at the Royal Exchange, Manchester. (2011)
