= Talawa Theatre Company =

Black British theatre company

- Formation: 1986; 40 years ago
- Type: Theatre group
- Artistic director: Michael Buffong
- Website: www.talawa.com

Talawa Theatre Company is a Black British theatre company founded in 1986.

The core of Talawa's work is championing reinterpretations of classic plays, developing new writing and directing talent, and developing and producing new plays from and about the Black British community and Caribbean and African diaspora within Britain.

Talawa Theatre Company is a National Portfolio Organisation, supported by funding from Arts Council England in recognition of consistently high-quality artistic work, and was one of very few organisations to receive an uplift in its grant for the period between 2018 and 2022 in recognition for its audience development.

Since 2011, Talawa Theatre Company has been led by CEO and Artistic Director Michael Buffong, whose career spans theatre, television, radio and film.

In February 2019, Buffong announced plans for a 200-seat on-site performance space at Croydon's Fairfield Halls, describing the move as enabling the organisation to "make outstanding work which will truly diversify and shape the cultural life of the whole country." Carolyn ML Forsyth joined the organisation in November 2020 to work alongside Michael Buffong as joint CEO and executive director.

Talawa's 2021 season, coming out of the COVID-19 pandemic, highlighted a mix of livestreamed work and online workshops gradually building towards live performance later in the year.

Following the COVID-19 pandemic, and along with all Arts Council England National Portfolio Organisations, Talawa was granted an additional year's grant extension to ensure stability. The 2023-2026 investment programme from Arts Council England ensured that Talawa retained its NPO status with an enhanced grant in view of its audience development and community engagement activity.

The name Talawa comes from a Jamaican patois saying "Me lickle but me talawa", meaning to be small but strong.

== Mission ==
The company's stated mission is "to champion Black Excellence in theatre; to nurture talent in emerging and established artists of African or Caribbean heritage and to tell inspirational and passionate stories reflecting Black experiences through art." In doing so, the company provides opportunities for black directors, writers and actors, and creatives to make theatre on British stages, and to enlarge theatre audiences seeing black work. Talawa's work embraces touring classical works on the mid-scale to regional theatres in the UK, literary and participation activities, finding and developing new writers and scripts, and developing theatre-makers, artists and directors. Alongside this, Talawa also runs unconscious bias training workshops for educational institutions and corporate clients.

== History ==
Jamaican-born Yvonne Brewster, Mona Hammond, and Guyanese Carmen Munroe and Inigo Espejel founded the company in 1986.

Talawa's first production in 1986 was The Black Jacobins by C. L. R. James, a play that had not been performed in England for 50 years, and never before with an all-black cast.

Since then, Talawa has produced and toured classic work by numerous playwrights and writers including Dennis Scott, Derek Walcott, Galt MacDermot, Sol B River, Wole Soyinka, James Baldwin, Michael Abbensetts, Trevor Rhone, William Shakespeare, Oscar Wilde, Samuel Beckett, Tariq Ali, Theresa Ikoko, Natasha Marshall and Arthur Miller and worked with a variety of directors and actors including Michaela Coel, Cathy Tyson, Dona Croll, Ray Shell, Norman Beaton, Horace Ove, Paulette Randall, Don Warrington, Sharon D Clarke, Fraser Ayres and David Harewood.

Talawa had a home at Bloomsbury's Jeannetta Cochrane Theatre from 1991 until 1995, a period within which the company achieved a high profile. Following the departure from the Cochrane Theatre in 1995, the failed attempt to secure a new theatre space in Victoria, and the departure of its founder Yvonne Brewster in 2003, Talawa was briefly led by Ben Thomas, and then Bonnie Greer, Paulette Randall, and Patricia Cumper, under whose direction the company regained Arts Council funding. Michael Buffong took over the helm from Patricia Cumper, securing enhanced Arts Council England National Portfolio Organisation status for the company and leading to a renewed profile for its work with new artists and its revived classic theatre productions. Michael Buffong featured on Creative Review's "50 Creative Leaders" list in 2017, having also featured in the Powerlist that celebrates Britain's most influential people of African or African Caribbean heritage.

In February 2019, plans for a 200-seat on-site performance space at Croydon's Fairfield Halls were revealed. The move gave Talawa its first such space since a residency at the Cochrane Theatre came to an end in 1995.

== Artist development ==
As well as touring major works across the UK, Talawa Theatre Company commissions new plays, and develops theatre artists and directors.

In January 2017, Talawa announced the creation of MAKE, a career development community of Black theatre artists. The MAKE community creates 250 new opportunities for Black artists every year, across four areas, enabling artists to make connections and build the support they need to create new work. A Talawa spokesperson commented that "Diversity projects tend to be just that – projects – and as a quick-fix approach, they are not building an infrastructure. What we need is sustained engagement that provides artists with a pathway into the industry, and the footholds to keep them there ...".

As part of MAKE, Talawa also offers a script reading service and produces an annual season of play readings, named Talawa Firsts, which showcases the best new black writing talent. The company also supports and develops emerging theatre-makers – performers, designers and technicians – through their flagship participation programmes TYPT, and Studio Firsts.

== Recent productions ==
Talawa Theatre Company co-produces a major touring production annually in addition to a rolling programme of artist development and showcases of new work.

=== Productions in the 2020s ===
==== Play On! ====
Talawa's production of Play On! toured the UK from September 2024 to February 2025. Set in the 1940s at New York's Cotton Club, this retelling of Shakespeare's Twelfth Night was a co production with Belgrade Theatre, Birmingham Hippodrome, Liverpool Everyman & Playhouse, Lyric Hammersmith Theatre and Wiltshire Creative. The production was directed by Talawa's Artistic Director Michael Buffong, with Kenrick H2O Sandy as choreographer, and production design by ULTZ.

Reception to the production was broadly positive, with The Guardian, The Times, The Observer, The Standard, All That Dazzles, London Theatre, and The Stage all awarding 4 stars to the production.

The Bristol 24/7 review stated that the production was "charming, enchanting, and laugh-out-loud funny..." Of the 5-star reviews, Spy in the Stalls noted the "ever-increasing 'wow factor'", Theatre Weekly described it as "an exhilarating production that melts the winter blues", with What's On Stage singling out the ensemble for praise.

Play On! was part of Talawa's revived "Black Joy" season.

==== Recognition ====
Recognition is co-created by Amanda Wilkin and Rachael Nanyonjo, written by Amanda Wilkin and directed by Rachael Nanyonjo. Recognition has original music composed by Mercury Prize-nominated Seed Ensemble leader Cassie Kinoshi (published by Decca Publishing) as well as Samuel Coleridge-Taylor's compositions.

Samuel Coleridge-Taylor was a successful dual-heritage African and British composer and Croydon resident. Talawa Theatre Company presented Recognition as part of This Is Croydon, London Borough of Culture 2023 programme.

Recognition was largely well received, with one reviewer describing it as "a superb piece of theatre", while others parised the assured direction and the elegance of the staging and strong performances.

==== Running With Lions ====
Written by Sian Carter (née Davila), Running With Lions began life as an audio play directed by Michael Buffong on BBC Radio 4 as part of the Talawa Stories season. In September 2021, Lyric Hammersmith announced the co-production with Talawa of Sian Carter's Running With Lions, which would again be directed by Buffong, the production being performed in February 2022.

Running With Lions was well received, with critics reserving praise for Carter's writing

==== A Place For We ====
A Place for We by Archie Maddocks was announced as a co-production between Talawa Theatre Company and Park Theatre, opening in early October 2021. Having been postponed during the COVID-19 pandemic, the production returned with a cast including David Webber and Blake Harrison, in a production directed by Michael Buffong. Referring to the story and setting of A Place For We, Buffong said: "In Talawa's 35-year history we've been at the forefront of presenting the issues faced by our communities. More than ever, gentrification is the pressing issue of our day." Critical receptions to the play were largely complimentary, with reviews awarding three to five stars. The Guardian review held particular praise for the "subtlety and naturalism" of the production, awarding four stars. Awarding five stars, the Theatre Weekly review dubbed A Place for We "the funniest play of the year". What's On Stage commented that "This production has been a long time coming... but rest assured, it has been worth the wait".

==== Run It Back ====
Run It Back is a show with a live DJ set inspired by Black British club culture and was originally devised by Talawa Theatre Company's TYPT 2018 company. Run It Back would have opened the Talawa Studio at Fairfield Halls in spring 2020, but plans were postponed following the lockdowns arising as a result of the COVID-19 pandemic. Run It Back was revived in September 2021 to both critical and audience acclaim. The reviewer for The Stage awarded the production five stars, stating that it was: "full of exuberance, but it’s not an uncritical celebration. The piece also offers gentle interrogation of some of the more problematic elements of music and club culture, by highlighting homophobic lyrics and violently misogynist behaviour that so often goes unchecked." Meanwhile, The Guardian went further, with Arifa Akbar declaring Run It Back to be: "the purest enactment of 'black joy' – as a political act – I have seen in the past year."

==== The Tide ====
In August 2021, Talawa revived The Tide for a free national tour of Talawa's first production created exclusively for outdoor performance. The Tide is a movement based theatre production and is an artistic collaboration between choreographer Jade Hackett and writer Ryan Calais Cameron which explores the narratives and experiences of migration within the United Kingdom,

==== Talawa Stories ====
In May 2021, Talawa presented three well received new radio dramas on BBC Radio 4, co-produced with radio production company, feral inc.

==== Tales from the Front Line ====
In July 2020, Talawa announced that Tales from the Front Line, based on verbatim interviews from Black key and frontline workers during the COVID-19 pandemic, would be available from Autumn 2020. Tales from the Front Line was launched on 30 November 2020, with the first two films of dramatised verbatim testimony getting good notices.

The first film presented a verbatim narrative from a Teacher, played by Jo Martin, talking about trying to keep themselves and their pupils safe during the pandemic, the emotional and psychological impact of the global Black Lives Matter movement, and the challenges of supporting students' education during an era of great uncertainty. The second film presented a verbatim narrative from an NHS Recovery Worker, played by Sapphire Joy, which highlighted the racial bias in the medical treatment of Black people, and their disdain for performative gratitude during the pandemic, followed by the failure to award pay rises to front line staff. As Buffong explained in interviews at the time: "These are the words of the teacher, the health worker, the train dispatch worker, the woman who works in the supermarket warehouse."

The Guardian reviewer commented that the stories were "not just about expressing anger at systemic injustice. They are miniature character studies, rich in insight and individual detail. They reveal a person and a life, as well as giving a depth of meaning to the high rates of Covid-related deaths among people of colour in Britain." The Stage review focused on the verbatim aspects of the work, stating: "This is a necessary art – an example of the way theatre can be used to educate and promote understanding. Where else can we hear the unadulterated stories of our front-line workers told in their own words?" iPaper stated that it was "Impossible not to listen; impossible to look away" from the pieces.

Many reviewers commented on the quality of the films, as well as the power of the verbatim narratives. Further episodes were released in February and April 2021.

==== Black Joy ====
In Autumn 2020, Talawa and Birmingham Repertory Theatre announced their Black Joy season. Following that announcement, Birmingham Repertory Theatre revealed that they would hire several spaces "to operate a Nightingale Court from December '20 to June '21". This move was not well received by many Black artists, creatives and community leaders. Press reports highlighted that the move had "alienated staff, audiences and cultural workforce", leading to criticism from prominent figures, including the comedian Joe Lycett. Both The Times and The Daily Telegraph referred to figures from the House of Commons library, which showed that black and minority ethnic people are over-represented within the criminal justice system, accounting for 23 per cent of people prosecuted (against 16 per cent of population), and 27 per cent of prison inmates and, with average sentences longer than those of white people. The New York Times highlighted the lack of transparency around Birmingham Repertory Theatre's decision.

Subsequently, Talawa announced "…that having to make the difficult calls between maintaining the creative and political integrity of cultural buildings, and preserving the jobs of those who work within them, is a position arts leaders shouldn't be forced into", going on to state: "The decision Birmingham Rep have taken to host a Nightingale Court does not align with Talawa's commitment to Black artists and communities, the communities most affected by this decision. It has threatened the integrity of the Black Joy season; regrettably the partnership is no longer tenable under current circumstances." Talawa have stated that they are "exploring our options" to still bring the season "to the audiences it was intended for".

==== COVID-19 pandemic ====
In common with other parts of the live performance sector, and in line with advice from the UK Government and health authorities, Talawa Theatre Company staff transferred to working from home, releasing updates on company activity in early May 2020 and late September 2020. In common with many theatre companies at a time when live performance was not possible, Talawa transferred activities online, holding advice and career development sessions, and developing work for release in digital or broadcast formats as part of Tales from the Front Line and Talawa Stories for BBC Radio 4. No Talawa staff were placed on furlough, made redundant or worked reduced hours.

===== A Place for We =====
In October 2019, Talawa announced the co-production with Park Theatre (London) of Archie Maddocks's debut play A Place for We, which was first performed in a staged reading at Talawa Firsts 2018. Due to the COVID-19 pandemic the production, which was to have played to audiences in May and June 2020, was postponed.

A Place for We performed in a Talawa and Park Theatre co-production at Park Theatre in October 2021.

===== Run It Back =====
In January 2020, Talawa announced Run It Back, a rave-inspired show with a live DJ set that had been originally devised by Talawa Theatre Company's TYPT 2018 company. Run It Back was to have opened the Talawa Studio at Fairfield Halls and played from late March to early April 2020. Due to the COVID-19 pandemic the production was postponed. Run It Back was announced as part of Talawa's 2021 season, performing in September 2021 and was well received by critics and audiences alike, with the Guardian's critic, Arifa Akbar describing it as "This is the purest enactment of 'black joy' – as a political act – I have seen in the past year".

=== Productions in the 2010s ===
==== The Tide ====
In February 2019, Talawa announced The Tide, a Talawa Theatre Company, Greenwich+Docklands International Festival, and Breakin' Convention co-production, and Talawa's first ever show created exclusively for outdoor performance. The Tide played at Brighton Festival on 11 May, at Norfolk & Norwich Festival on 18 and 19 May and at Greenwich + Docklands International Festival on 29 June 2019.

The Tide was also announced as part of Talawa's 2021 season, returning to the Greenwich+Docklands International Festival and also popping up in Croydon.

==== Superhoe ====
In October 2018, Talawa and Royal Court Theatre announced their co-production of Superhoe by Nicôle Lecky, which had previously been performed as a staged reading at Talawa Firsts in 2018. Superhoe tells the story of Sasha, a wannabe singer living with her mother and step-father in Plaistow, East London. A fraught relationship with them propels Sasha out into a world of cam and sex work, and Instagram fakery. There was praise for Lecky, with one reviewer writing: "performing her own raw and fiery solo piece, she's a revelation...." while another stated that the "slow reveal of all the ways in which Sasha has been neglected, damaged and violated is deeply affecting." The play was adapted into a TV-series, Mood, in 2022.

==== Guys and Dolls ====
Talawa announced their winter 2017 co-production with the Royal Exchange Theatre of the Damon Runyon-inspired musical, Guys and Dolls, the first UK production with an all-Black cast. Among the cast announced for Guys and Dolls were Ray Fearon, Ashley Zhanghazha, Abiona Omonua, and Lucy Vandi. Guys and Dolls played at Manchester's Royal Exchange Theatre in an extended run from December 2017 to February 2018.

Reviews had particular praise for the music, direction, relocation to Harlem and sense of spectacle. As Lyn Gardner noted in The Guardian, "the gamblers ... are a bunch of sharp-suited peacocks clad in rainbow hues." The reviewer for The Times wrote: "Whoever had the idea of moving this classic musical from one part of New York to another bit, just up the road, needs to be congratulated. This version of Frank Loesser's musical, which swirls around the lives of the petty gangsters and their 'dolls' who inhabit New York's underbelly, moves the action to Harlem at its prewar height in 1939. It is a Talawa production with an all-black cast and it is terrific from the get-go." The Observer noted: "Relocated to Harlem, this fine new production of Frank Loesser’s classic musical retains a threat of violence under a cartoon-bright exterior."

==== Half Breed ====
Described variously as a story about growing up mixed-race, and as a story about friendship, Half Breed was written by Natasha Marshall and first performed at Talawa Firsts 2016 before being developed further by both Talawa and the Soho Theatre. That same partnership presented Half Breed at Edinburgh in summer 2017. At the time Marshall said: "My whole life I've been holding my breath but when I perform Half-Breed I feel like I'm breathing. I want to bring something real and different to the Fringe. I want to create a conversation, I want to open people's minds up."

Half Breed was nominated as a "Best New Play" at the UK Theatre Awards. Half Breed was nominated for Offies for "Best New Play", "Best Female Performance" and "Most Promising New Playwright".

Half Breed had a sell-out London run following its success at Edinburgh. The co-production of Half Breed toured India in autumn 2017, where it was well received by audiences and critics alike.

Half Breed toured the UK in Spring 2018 as a co-production between Talawa Theatre Company and Soho Theatre. Half Breed was also broadcast on BBC4 in April 2021 as part of "Culture in Quarantine".

==== Girls ====
Also in 2016, Talawa also co-produced the award-winning play by Theresa Ikoko, Girls, the story of three young women kidnapped by extremists.

The Times referred to Girls as "Scorchingly intelligent and as powerful as a gut punch", while Time Out called it "clever, audacious, entertaining and full of promise."

Theresa Ikoko commented on her experience of working with Talawa to get the story produced, saying: "This isn't the first play I've written, but it's my first produced play. The first play I wrote, I didn't really know it was a play, it was just for me. I would read it over the phone to my friend and when I'd finished he said I had to show it to someone. Talawa Theatre Company found me and [artistic director] Michael Buffong put that play in a Talawa Firsts show, and I got signed by my agent there ... Talawa completely took a chance on me. I had no training or experience or credentials, and there was no one to offer a reference. But Michael believed in me. It took me forever though, probably until the opening night of Girls at HighTide, for me to believe him."

In 2017, Girls went on tour with a new cast, having first played at the Edinburgh Festival, where it was presented as part of the British Council Edinburgh Showcase.

==== King Lear ====
In October 2015, Talawa announced a new production of William Shakespeare's King Lear starring Don Warrington in the title role. King Lear was co-produced with the Royal Exchange Theatre in Manchester.

Reviews singled out the production for being "as close to definitive as can be", "a significant production" and "outstanding". Don Warrington's performance as King Lear was described as "a heartbreaking tour de force".

In late June 2016, Talawa Theatre Company announced the film of King Lear, in a collaboration with the Royal Exchange Theatre and funded by the digital commissioning body The Space. The film was available to view on-demand and free of charge on BBC iPlayer and the British Council's websites for three months in summer 2016, ahead of a cinema release in September and October 2016, and closed 2016 by being screened on BBC4 on Christmas Day.

==== All My Sons ====
Talawa Theatre Company toured a revival of Arthur Miller's All My Sons in spring 2015.

Critics described the production as "heart wrenching", noting that "Talawa's contribution to the Arthur Miller centenary ... is a worthwhile one" and one that "ratchets up the tension".

==== Moon on a Rainbow Shawl ====
The 2013–14 production was a revival of Moon on a Rainbow Shawl by Errol John that was directed by Michael Buffong, which toured across the UK, in addition to playing at the Royal National Theatre. Critics described the show as "an absolute must-see" "a well-crafted slow burner" and "treats the characters as real people rather than outrageous exotics ... Justice, you feel, has at last been done ..."

== See also ==
- Alfred Fagon Award
- Black British Theatre Awards
