= Manchester Evening News Theatre Awards =

The Manchester Evening News Theatre Awards (MENTA) were a theatre awards ceremony that recognised live theatre within Greater Manchester. They were administered by the Manchester Evening News, and presented at an annual ceremony in Manchester, England. The awards were for regional and nationally touring productions and were created in 1981 by Alan Hulme, who wrote for the paper as theatre critic from 1970 to 2000. The first ceremony was held in the conference room of the MEN in their then Deansgate offices, and the awards were held annually until 2010, when the Manchester Evening News ended its association with the awards, however a group of former panel members announced in October 2011 that they were to continue the awards as an independent body under the name Manchester Theatre Awards.
