= David Bernstein (architect) =

American-born architect (born 1937)

David Bernstein (24 June 1937 – 21 January 2018) was an American-born architect who mainly practiced in the UK. He co-founded the London-based Circle 33 housing association and architects practice Levitt Bernstein, working extensively on housing projects.

== Early life and education ==
Bernstein was born in New York in 1937, the son of ambitious Jewish parents, Diana and Sol Bernstein.

He studied architecture at the University of Cincinnati, before attending Louis Kahn's masterclasses at Philadelphia University in 1962.

== Career ==
With his wife Beverly, he moved to London in 1964, and both worked for a while at the Architectural Association School of Architecture; his AA students included Marco Goldschmied, Tony Fretton, Peter Blundell Jones, and Mike Davies.

Bernstein also worked for William Whitfield before joining Patrick Hodgkinson's practice in 1966. He was one of five assistants who worked on the design of Camden's Brunswick Centre - one of the first large-scale scheme to show that housing could be built at high densities without tower blocks. David Levitt was one of the other assistants and they established a long-term partnership,

Influenced by John Coward, chief executive of the Notting Hill Housing Trust, by the charity Shelter, and by the 1966 BBC drama Cathy Come Home, in 1968, Bernstein, Levitt and their wives co-founded the housing association Circle 33, running it for six years before choosing to devote their professional time to their architecture practice, Levitt Bernsten, also co-founded in 1968.

Bernstein subsequently led numerous London social housing projects, including schemes for the Peabody Trust, Metropolitan Housing Trust and Tower Hamlets Housing Action Trust, and insisted that designing social housing was always a process of collaboration between architect and resident. In larger commissions, he embraced Oscar Newman's concept of defensible space. In consultation with residents, the practice redeveloped Hackney's Holly Street, remodelled Arlington House, an Edwardian hostel in Camden for single working men, and created 33 sheltered flats for elderly people and 10 family homes in Hart Hill Lane in Luton. The firm subsequently expanded into other areas of work, notably arts venues such as Manchester's Royal Exchange Theatre - a project led by an early Levitt Bernstein recruit, Axel Burrough.

== Family life ==
Bernstein married economist Beverly Liden in 1962, but his parents disapproved of the marriage, and in 1964, the couple moved to London (and never returned to the US). Beverly developed a career as a planner. After she was diagnosed with cancer in 2003, Bernstein took early retirement to spend more time with her. She died in 2012.

Bernstein died on 21 January 2018 from cancer. He was recalled by Levitt Bernstein managing director Matthew Goulcher as being "kind, light-hearted and full of integrity".
