= Richard Negri =

- Born: Richard Anthony Negri; 27 June 1927; London, UK
- Died: 17 April 1999 (aged 71)
- Education: Old Vic Theatre School
- Occupations: Theatre director and designer
- Years active: 1951–1983
- Spouse: Jill Adams (1956–1998)
- Children: 8

Richard Negri (27 June 1927, London – 17 April 1999, Fakenham, Norfolk) was a British theatre director and designer.

== Early life ==
Richard Negri was born on 27 June 1927 in Stamford Hill, London to parents of Italian origin: Riccardo Negri and Teresa Manattini. The family moved to Chingford in Essex where he was educated. He served in the Royal Navy as a radio engineer at the end of the Second World War and afterwards studied Art under David Bomberg at Borough Polytechnic (later to become part of South Bank University). In 1951 he attended the Old Vic Theatre School to study theatre design. The director of the school, Michel Saint-Denis, was especially influential on Negri's thinking and development as a theatre designer as was the designer Margaret (Percy) Harris (of the renowned all female design group Motley), the design tutor at the school.

== Career ==
After leaving the Old Vic he spent a year designing for the Oldham Coliseum before founding the Piccolo Theatre company with director Frank Dunlop (a contemporary at the Old Vic Theatre School) in Chorlton-cum-Hardy, Manchester (which only survived for a year) and designing the productions. In 1957, at the Royal Court 'Nekrassov' by Jean-Paul Sartre directed by George Devine with Robert Helpmann heading a distinguished cast including Ronald Barker, Roddy McMillan, James Villiers, Bernard Kay and Harry H. Corbett. He also designed Chekhov's 'Platonov' directed by George Devine and John Blatchley at the Royal Court in 1960 with Rex Harrison as well as James Bolam, Peter Bowles, Ronald Barker, Rachel Roberts and Graham Crowden.

Also, Peter Shaffer's double bill 'The Private Eye' and 'The Public Ear' with Maggie Smith and Kenneth Williams at the Globe, in the West End directed by Peter Wood.

Shakespeare's 'King Richard II' at London's Old Vic in 1959, directed by Val May with Maggie Smith as the Queen to John Justin's King Richard. George Baker, John Woodvine and Joss Ackland were also in the cast.

'Lady at the Wheel' a musical comedy directed by Wendy Toye in 1958, costumes by Motley and lighting by Richard Pilbrow with Bernard Cribbins at the Lyric Theatre, Hammersmith.

'Masterpiece' in 1961, a play by Larry Ward and Gordon Russell, directed by Harry Kaplan, lighting by Richard Pilbrow at the Royalty Theatre. Anton Walbrook and Margaret Johnston headed a strong cast that included Peter Sallis, Patrick Magee, Robert Eddison and Arnold Marlé.

At the Bristol Old Vic he designed a production of Joseph O'Conor's early play, 'The Iron Harp'. With Peter O'Toole in the lead role (alongside O'Conor) the play also gave a first important role to Richard Harris.

Negri also had a six-month spell as a television designer and his work at that time included designs for Ibsen's 'John Gabriel Borkman', which marked Laurence Olivier's television debut in the title role and 'Hay Fever' with Edith Evans and Maggie Smith, both directed by Casper Wrede. Also: 'The Living Room' with Dorothy Tutin, Ring Round The Moon' with Yvonne Arnaud, 'Touch of the Sun' with Michael Redgrave all directed by Lionel Harris. Working with director Peter Wood, Negri also designed 'Sunday out of Season' with Alec McCowan and Maggie Smith.

In 1959 he started to design for the 59 Theatre Company, based at the Lyric Theatre. The company was run by Michael Elliott and Casper Wrede, a friend from the Old Vic and, although short-lived, the company achieved considerable success with productions of Brand (designed by Negri), Little Eyolf and Danton's Death. When Wrede and Elliott went on to run a season of plays at the Old Vic in 1961 Negri joined them as designer.

In 1962 Negri began teaching as a part-time lecturer at Wimbledon School of Art in the Theatre Department teaching on the theatre design course; by the end of 1963 he had become Head of Department on Peter Bucknell's (former head of the Theatre Department) promotion to Principal.

The formation of the 69 Theatre Company by Wrede, Elliott, and Braham Murray in Manchester led to Negri designing many of the productions at the University Theatre including Peer Gynt and The Tempest. Based upon the success of the Company the group started to look for a permanent theatre in Manchester and eventually a new theatre was built inside the disused Royal Exchange with Negri as the designer of the theatre and one of the founding artistic directors.

The design incorporated the ideas of the founding group; Wrede, Elliott, Murray, the actor James Maxwell and Negri himself. According to Murray, Negri's design was based upon a beehive and meant that no one would be seated more than thirty feet from the stage. "The audience would be suspended between the world of the gods in the outer hall and the stage where the actors who entered from that world would act out their drama." The architects, Levitt Bernstein Associates, observed "the beginning for us was a small paper and wire model sitting in the middle of a table with Richard Negri striding round it talking about the form of a rose. How, we wondered, would we ever bring this man down to earth? Fortunately we never did." Axel Burrough led Levitt Bernstein's inputs.

The theatre opened on 15 September 1976 and Negri remained as an artistic director until 1983. He directed a number of productions in addition to his design work.

He had resigned from Wimbledon in 1974 to concentrate all his efforts on the Royal Exchange but returned in 1982 to continue his lecturing. He finally retired in 1988. His legacy remains both in the theatre he designed and in the students he taught. Johanna Bryant, one of key designers for the Royal Exchange, was one of his students.

National Life Stories conducted a series of interviews (C1173) with theatre designers, directors and actors in the 2000s about their memories of Negri for its An Oral History of Theatre Design collection held by the British Library.

== Personal life ==
Negri married Jill Adams on 27 September 1956 in Bury St Edmunds. They had two sons and six daughters

== Productions directed at The Royal Exchange ==
- The Skin of Our Teeth by Thornton Wilder. Directed by Richard Negri and James Maxwell with Olive McFarland and Lee Montague (1977)
- The Golden Country by Shusaku Endo. European premiere with Wolfe Morris, Geoffrey Bateman and Ian Hastings (1977)
- The Chairs by Eugène Ionesco with Gwen Nelson and Frank Thornton (1980)
- The Emperor Jones by Eugene O'Neill with Pete Postlethwaite and Albie Woodington (1980)
- The Caretaker by Harold Pinter with Charlie Drake, Jonathon Hackett and Tim McInnerny (1983)

== Bibliography ==
- The Royal Exchange Theatre Company Words & Pictures 1976–1998. The Royal Exchange Theatre Company Limited. 1998. ISBN 0-9512017-1-9.
- Murray, Braham (2007). The Worst It Can Be Is a Disaster. London: Methuen Drama. ISBN 978-0-7136-8490-2.
- Burrows, David (2013). The Life and Work of Richard Negri. London: The Society of British Theatre Designers. ISBN 978-0-9529309-6-9.
