= Levitt Bernstein =

UK architecture, landscape architecture, and urban design practice

Levitt Bernstein is a British architecture, landscape architecture and urban design practice established in 1968. It has studios in London, Manchester and Ireland, and in 2024 employed 112 people. Known particularly for housing and urban design projects, but also working in the arts, education and cultural sectors, the firm got into financial difficulties in 2026 during a contraction of the UK housing market.

== History ==
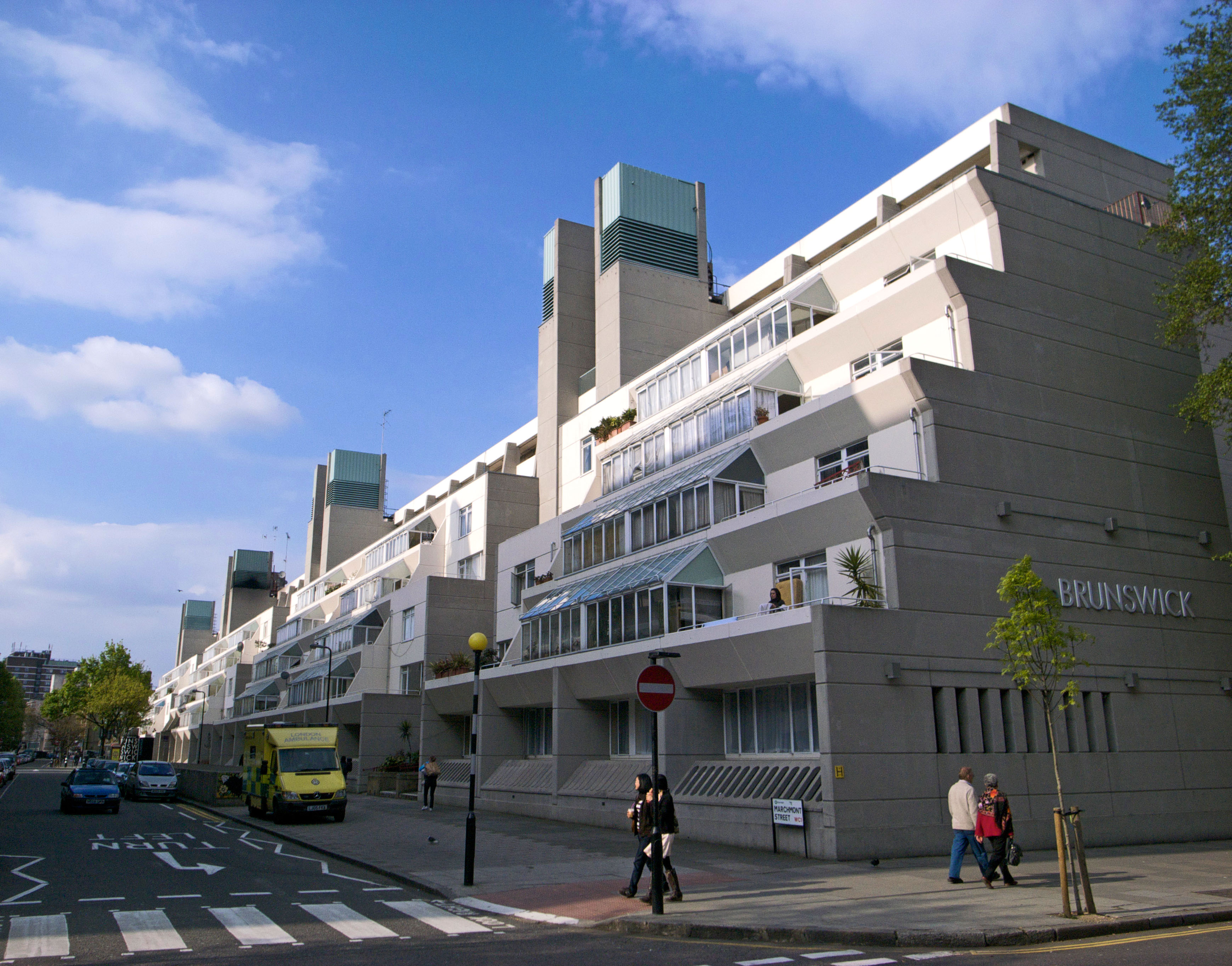
Brunswick Centre, London

The practice was established in 1968 by David Levitt and David Bernstein (1937–2018) after both had earlier worked for Patrick Hodgkinson on the design of the Brunswick Centre in London. During its first six years, the practice concentrated on social housing for the Circle 33 housing association (which he, Levitt and their wives also co-founded in 1968). One of their early recruits was Axel Burrough (1946–2026), who helped the firm expand into arts projects. By 1977, the firm had 40 staff.

Levitt Bernstein led numerous London social housing projects, including schemes for the Peabody Trust, Metropolitan Housing Trust and Tower Hamlets Housing Action Trust, and Bernstein insisted that designing social housing was always a process of collaboration between architect and resident. In larger commissions, he embraced Oscar Newman's concept of defensible space. In consultation with residents, the practice redeveloped Hackney's Holly Street, and remodelled Arlington House, an Edwardian hostel in Camden for single working men.

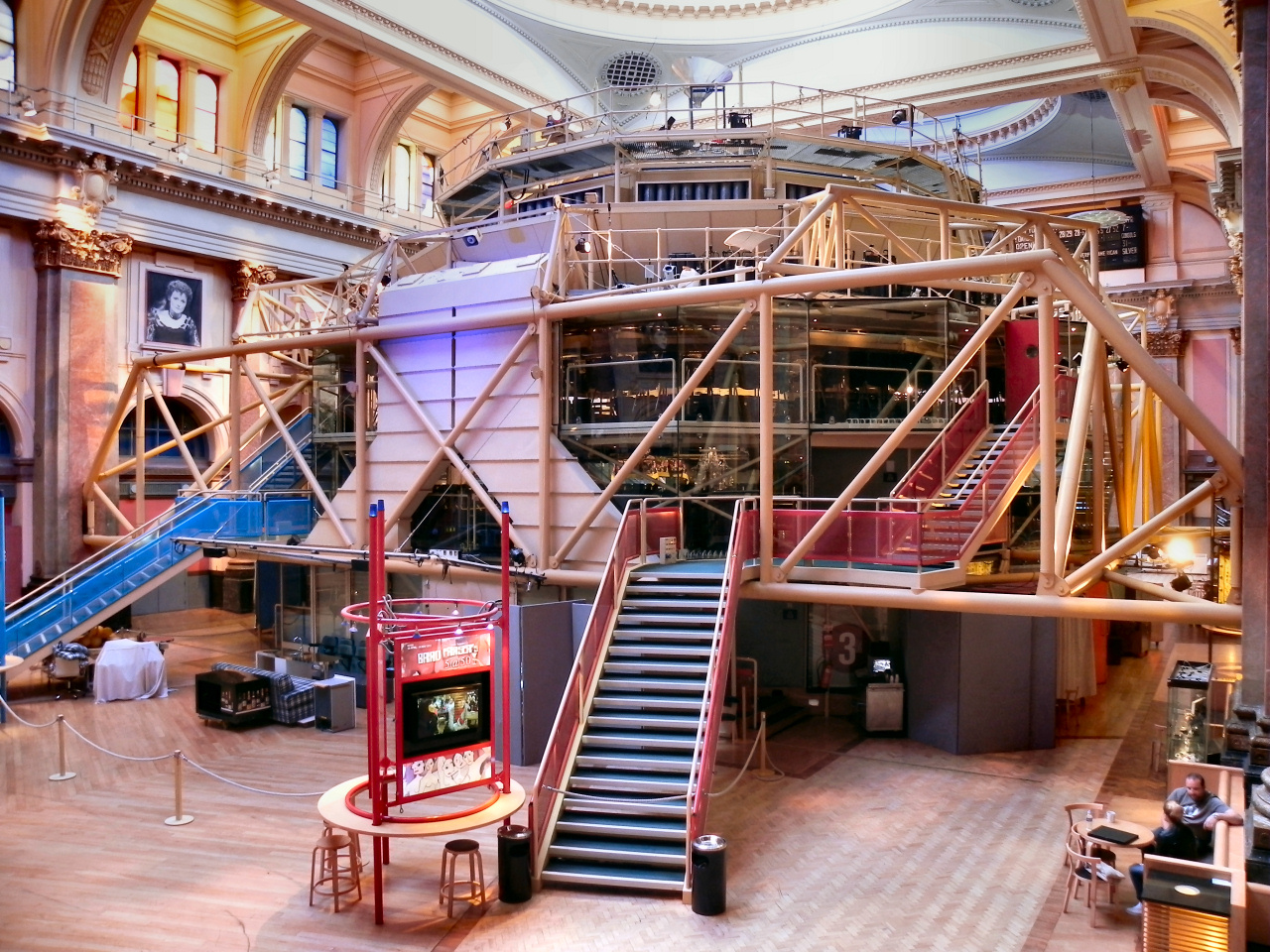
Theatre pod inside Royal Exchange, Manchester

The practice's expansion into arts projects followed a 1969 commission from the 69 Theatre Company to design a theatre within the Edwardian Grade II listed Royal Exchange in Manchester, which won a RIBA award in 1977. In 2002, Levitt Bernstein undertook further work on the Brunswick Centre. Bernstein took early retirement in 2003 after his wife's cancer diagnosis. Levitt retired three years later.

In 2024, Levitt Bernstein completed a £130m restoration of the Grade II-listed Bristol Beacon (formerly known as Colston Hall) for Bristol City Council and Bristol Music Trust.

Also in 2024, Levitt Bernstein Associates, which then empoyed 112 people, transitioned into an employee-owned trust, when shareholders sold 100 per cent of their shares to Levitt Bernstein EOT Limited.

In the year to 30 April 2025, Levitt Bernstein Associates had a turnover of £9.6m, and generated a pre-tax profit of £62,000, but its operating cashflow fell to £3,000 from almost £1.6m, while cash reserves fell from £1.37m to £720,000. Turnover from work in Ireland fell to £144,000 from £953,000. The firm opened a studio in Rathnew, County Wicklow in September 2025.

In June 2025, Levitt Bernstein co-founder David Levitt was named winner of the 2025 AJ100 Contribution to the Profession award for his outstanding commitment to housing and architecture.

In November 2026, the financially troubled, 100-strong practice cut jobs and applied for a company voluntary arrangement (CVA) with creditors. The news was described by RIBA president-elect Jay Morton as a massive alarm bell for the UK government as it struggled to meet a target to build 1.5 million new homes before the next election. RIBA president Chris Williamson also expressed his sadness, saying it was "part of a bigger worrying picture".

== Selected projects ==
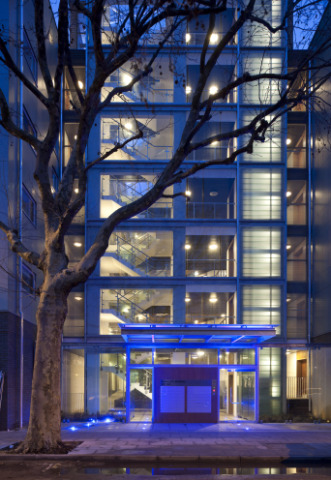
Bolanachi Building, Bermondsey Spa, London

Projects undertaken by Levitt Bernstein include:

- 1968, 2006 — The Brunswick Centre, London
- 1969–1976, 1998 — Royal Exchange Theatre, Manchester
- 1977 — Hart Hill Lane housing, Luton
- 1980s — Arlington House, Camden
- 1993 — Gateway Centre, Southwark
- 1997 — Ikon Gallery, Birmingham
- 1999, 2026 — Bristol Beacon, Bristol
- 1998 — Victoria Hall, Stoke-on-Trent
- 2001 — Stratford Circus, London
- 2003 — LSO St Luke's, London
- 2004 — YMCA Indian Student Hostel, London
- 2007 — Toynbee Studios, London
- 2005–2007 — Theatre Royal, Bury St Edmunds (restoration)
- 2007 — James Lighthill House, University College London
- 2008 — Victoria Gallery & Museum, University of Liverpool
- 2008 — Ramsay Hall, University College London
- 2009 — Granville new homes, London
- 2009 — Bolanachi Building, Bermondsey Spa, London
- 2010 — Heating infrastructure project (HIP), University of Liverpool
- 2010 — Greengate House, London
- 2011 — Central House, University College London
- 2011 — Queensbridge Quarter, London
- 2011 — Aylesbury Estate South West Corner, London
- 2011 — Harvey Court (refurbishment and modernisation), Gonville and Caius College, Cambridge
- 2013 — Papermill Place, Walthamstow, London
- 2013 — John Dodgson House, University College London
- 2014 — VIVO, Ocean Estate, Tower Hamlets, London
- 2014 — So Stepney, Ocean Estate, Tower Hamlets, London

== Awards ==
The firm has won various awards, including:

- RIBA architectural awards
- Civic Trust Awards
- Housing Design Awards
- London Planning Awards
- Regeneration and Renewal Awards
- Housebuilder Awards
- Affordable Home Ownership Awards
- Constructing Excellence awards
- First Time Buyer Awards
- British Construction Industry Awards
