= St Luke Old Street =

Coordinates: 51°31′30.66″N 0°5′38.61″W

St Luke's Old Street
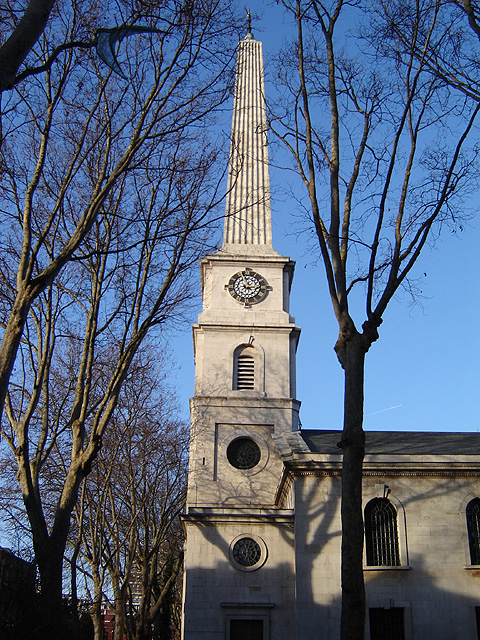
- 2006 photo
- St Luke's Old Street
- OS grid reference: TQ 32320 82421
- Location: Old Street, London
- Country: England
- Denomination: Church of England (Deconsecrated)

History
- Founded: 1733
- Dedication: St Luke

Architecture
- Functional status: Preserved; Used as concert venue by the LSO
- Architect(s): John James and Nicholas Hawksmoor
- Years built: 1727–1733
- Closed: 1959

Administration
- Diocese: London

St Luke's is a historic Anglican church building in central London, and in the London Borough of Islington. It served as a parish church from 1733 to 1959. It was designed by John James and Nicholas Hawksmoor, and is a Grade I listed building.

Following closure in 1959, the church stood derelict and roofless for some 40 years, but since 2003 has been a music centre operated by the London Symphony Orchestra and known as LSO St Luke's. It is the home of the LSO's community and music education programme, LSO Discovery. The main body of the building seats up to 372 and is used by the LSO for rehearsals, and by a wide variety of musicians for performances and recording. Additional rooms in the crypt provide practice facilities for professional musicians, students and community groups.

== History ==
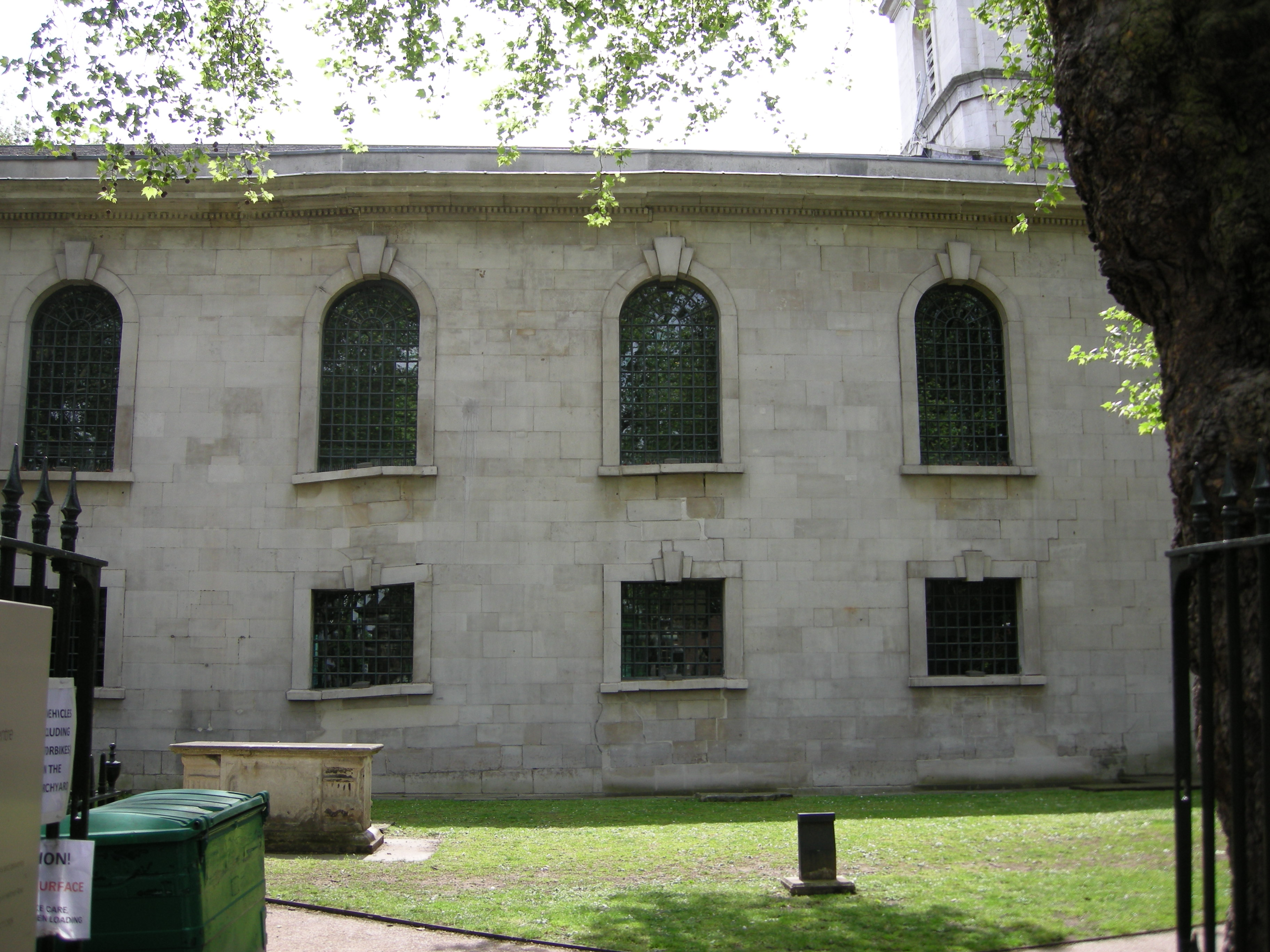
The north side of St Luke's, showing the distortion of the windows caused by the subsidence which prompted the church's closure

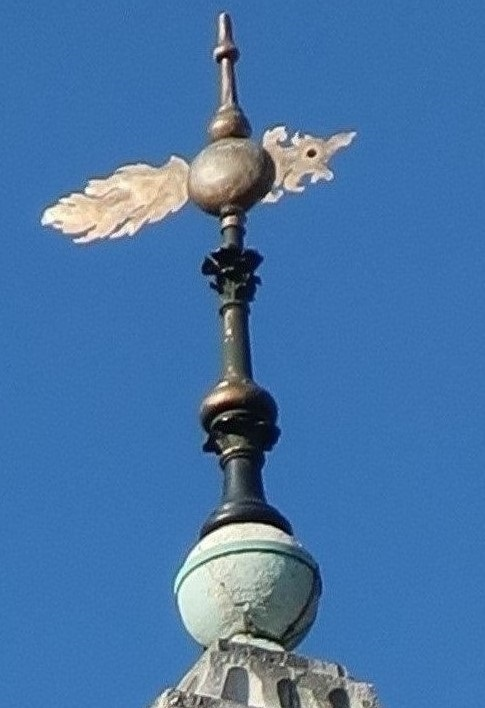
The weather vane

The church is sited on Old Street, north of the City of London. It was built to relieve the City church of St Giles-without-Cripplegate, Cripplegate, under the Commission for Building Fifty New Churches, an attempt to meet the religious needs of London's burgeoning 18th-century population. The ancient parish of St Giles lay partly within the City and partly outside its boundaries in Middlesex: under the Commissioners' scheme these two parts were to be separated, with the Middlesex portion (historically the Manor of Finsbury) becoming a new parish of St Luke's. Construction began in 1727 and was completed in 1733, when the church was consecrated on 18 October (St Luke's day), and the parish detached from that of St Giles.

The architects were the joint salaried surveyors to the Commission, John James and Nicholas Hawksmoor. Their respective contributions to the project remain unclear and a matter of scholarly debate. Until recently, it was believed that James was responsible for the body of the church, and Hawksmoor for the west tower, the flanking staircase wings, and the obelisk spire (a most unusual feature for an Anglican church). However, in 2026 Jonathan Hales, drawing on a detailed comparison with other Hawksmoor churches, argued that Hawksmoor probably devised the overall plan for St Luke's, and that the rest of the design was an equal collaboration between the two architects.

The spire was topped by an unusual weather vane depicting the head of a dragon with a fiery comet-like tail: this was misinterpreted locally as a louse, and by the mid-20th century had gained the church the nickname "lousy St Luke's".

The church stood on often waterlogged ground, near the (historically) notoriously marshy Moorfields area, and from an early date (but particularly from the beginning of the 20th century) suffered from problems of subsidence. The effects of the subsidence remain visible in the distorted shapes of the windows on the north side of the building.

== Burials ==
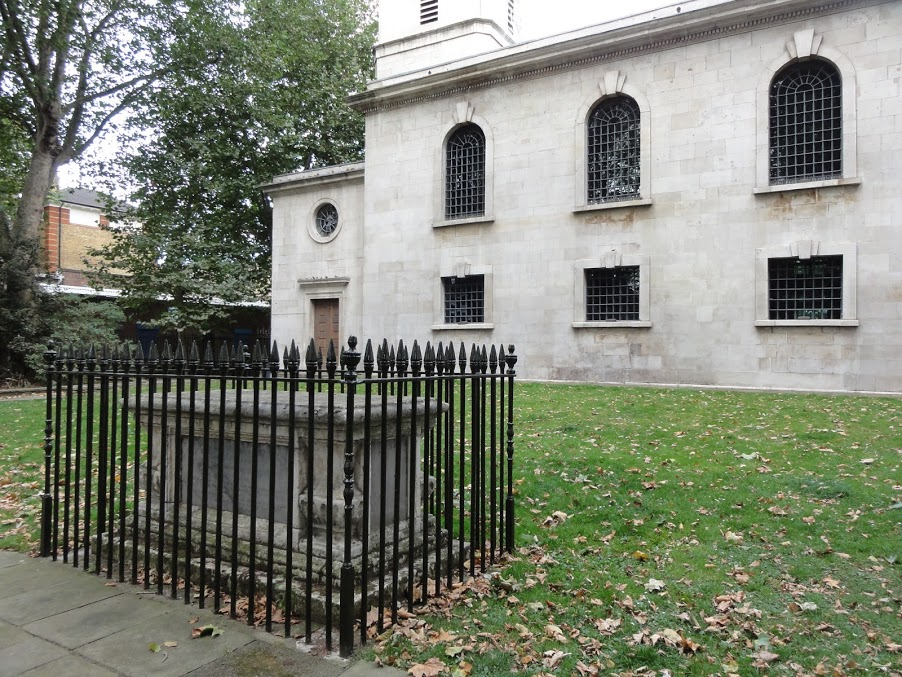
The Caslon family grave

Burials in the small churchyard included:

- Mark Catesby (1683–1749), naturalist. His grave is lost.
- William Caslon the elder (1692/1693–1766), type founder, his son William Caslon II (1720–1778) and other members of the family. They are commemorated by a listed chest tomb.
- George Dance the Elder (1695–1768), architect, and at one time a member of the vestry. His grave is lost.

In preparation for the conversion of the church into a music centre, the crypt was cleared of burials in the year 2000. A total of 1053 burials were archaeologically recorded, removed, and reburied at Brookwood Cemetery, Surrey. A television documentary, "Changing Tombs" (2001), recorded the process.

== Deconsecration and reuse ==
In 1959, in response to structural problems at the church resulting from subsidence, and to a declining inner-city population, the Diocese of London closed St Luke's and the parish was re-absorbed into that of St Giles-without-Cripplegate. The following year the font and organ case were moved to St Giles' church, the reredos and altar rails to St Andrew Holborn, and the roof was removed for safety reasons. The crypt was bricked up in 1964. The empty shell of St Luke's became a dramatic ruin for some 40 years, overgrown with trees, despite being a Grade I listed building.

After several controversial proposals to redevelop offices inside the retained walls, it was converted by the St Luke Centre Management Company Ltd for the London Symphony Orchestra as a concert hall, rehearsal and recording space, and educational resource. The conversion was designed by Axel Burrough of London architects Levitt Bernstein, who installed a heavy concrete slab roof which keeps out traffic noise from the nearby road. Though this is similar in profile to the former eighteenth-century roof, its great weight is supported on tall steel columns inside the hall described by the designer as "tree-like". The interior acoustic can be varied for different events, from full orchestra to soloists, by the use of absorbent surfaces that unroll like blinds across the ceiling and down the walls, whilst the seating and staging are also highly flexible. Work was completed in 2002, and the centre was brought into use early in 2003.

== Special events ==
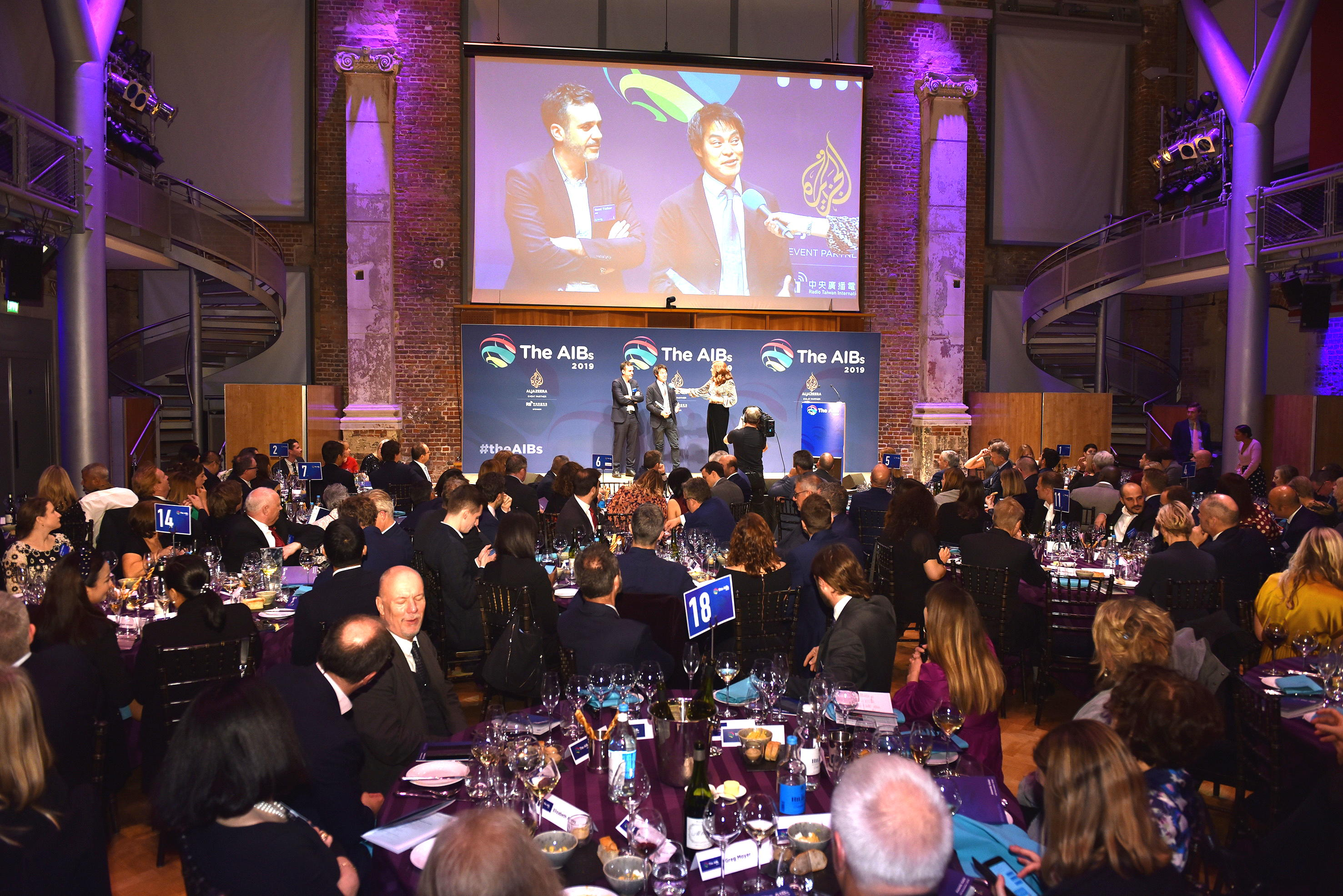
Association for International Broadcasting awards festival 2019, held at LSO St Luke's

The venue regularly hosts open rehearsals by the London Symphony Orchestra in advance of concerts at the nearby Barbican Hall, and has pioneered genre-busting events such as the Eclectica series, which combines classical, jazz, experimental and electronic sound-worlds.

Junior Trinity, the junior department of Trinity Laban Conservatoire of Music and Dance have also performed at LSO St Luke's as part of their seasonal concerts with their Symphony Orchestra, Wind Orchestra, Sinfonia, Big Band, and other notable groups.

During 2006 the BBC used the venue to record concerts by Bruce Springsteen and Paul Simon for broadcast.

In October 2006, Sting performed the songs of John Dowland with Edin Karamazov. The concert was later released on the CD/DVD, The Journey and the Labyrinth.

Sir Elton John also recorded a concert to publicise his album The Captain & the Kid.

MTV used the venue in 2007 to record a concert from Editors, for broadcast in the same year.

Patti Smith, Philip Glass and Lenny Kaye performed a tribute to Allen Ginsberg in 2007.

Van Morrison recorded a concert at St Luke's on BBC Four Sessions on 25 April 2008 featuring songs from his 2008 album, Keep It Simple.

In September 2008, Duffy played there for BBC Sessions; the concert was televised on 12 October 2008.

In December 2008, BBC Four broadcast Sacred Music: The Story of Allegri's Miserere, presented by Simon Russell Beale, with a performance by The Sixteen conducted by Harry Christophers at St Luke's.

== Sources ==
- Boyle, Angela; Boston, Ceridwen; Witkin, Annsofie (2005). The Archaeological Experience at St Luke's Church, Old Street, Islington (PDF). Oxford: Oxford Archaeology.
- Downes, Kerry (8 September 1960). "A church with an obelisk steeple". Country Life. 128 (3314): 479.
- Hales, Jonathan (2026). "A question of attribution: Nicholas Hawksmoor and John James at the Church of St Luke Old Street". Georgian Group Journal. 34: 39–58.
- Purcell Miller Tritton (2000). St Luke's, Old Street: Conservation Plan (PDF).
