= Circle: International Survey of Constructivist Art =

1937 art book published in London

- Editor: Ben Nicholson; Naum Gabo
- Language: English
- Genre: Art
- Publication date: 1937
- Publication place: United Kingdom

Circle: International Survey of Constructivist Art was an art book published in London, England, in 1937. It was edited by the artists Ben Nicholson and Naum Gabo and the architect Leslie Martin with the layout being designed by Barbara Hepworth. Circle was intended to be a series of publications so is sometimes referred to as a journal or magazine, although only one issue was actually produced.

Contributors are listed and categorized as painters, sculptors, architects, and writers on the front cover. The main texts are Gabo's essay "The Constructive Idea in Art" that is the main statement by the artist on his work and Piet Mondrian's seminal essay "Plastic Art and Pure Plastic Art". As well as these, others featured are:

- J. D. Bernal
- Constantin Brâncuși
- Le Corbusier
- Karel Honzík
- El Lissitzky
- Malevich
- László Moholy-Nagy
- Henry Moore
- Lewis Mumford
- Richard Neutra
- Antoine Pevsner
- Herbert Read
- Cecil Stephenson

Circle was reprinted in 1971 in the United States by Praeger Publishers and in the UK by Faber & Faber, in paperback.
