= Halls of residence at University College London =

This is a list of the halls of residence at University College London in London, England.

== Ramsay Hall ==
Ramsay Hall is a building located in London used primarily as a hall of residence for students of University College London.

=== History ===
The building was designed by Maxwell Fry. It opened for autumn term, 1964. It is situated on Maple Street in central London, on the border of Fitzrovia and Bloomsbury and around one hundred metres from Tottenham Court Road. The building is located within the Bloomsbury Conservation Area. It occupies the same block as, and forms a single unified building with, the YMCA Indian Student Hostel designed by Ralph Tubbs and was constructed at the same time. The building contains around 450 bedrooms, a dining hall and a number of common rooms and surrounds a central courtyard. In 2008 the building received a major refurbishment and an 8-storey extension containing 91 rooms was added, at a total cost of £8 million. The architects for the project were Levitt Bernstein and it won a Camden Building Excellence Award in 2009. The new extension was subsequently awarded a BREEAM 'very good' rating. In 2010 a further 10 bedrooms were added to the building. In 2018 further renovation work occurred, focusing particularly on upgrading the common lounge.

In 2019, it was filmed for Edgar Wright's psychological horror film Last Night in Soho as Eloise's (Thomasin McKenzie) former residential hall for the London College of Fashion, where she shared a room with her snobby roommate Jocasta.

=== Residents ===
Notable former residents include all four members of the British band Coldplay, who met whilst living at the hall.

Filmmaker and director Christopher Nolan was a resident. He read English Language and Literature at UCL and was a member of the film society there.

=== Hostel ===
Outside UCL term time the building serves as a hostel. There are numerous images of the building within the Courtauld Institute of Art's Conway Collection.

== James Lighthill House ==
James Lighthill House is located on Penton Rise near the Pentonville Road intersection. It contains 209 single en suite rooms across a large main block and a smaller 'lodge' in the courtyard. All flats are self-catered and share a communal kitchen cleaned once a week by staff. There is a laundrette on site and a large common room with an air-hockey table. The closest London Underground stations to the halls are King's Cross St Pancras and Angel.

=== History ===
James Lighthill House and Paul Robeson House, another hall of residence for the School of Oriental and African Studies, are both on the site of a former steel-stockbroking depot, owned and operated by Macready's Metal Co. Ltd. The original warehouse, built in 1935, was designed by M. Stanley Blanchfield of Raynes Park.

The current building was designed by the British architectural design firm Levitt Bernstein on the site of an existing hall of residence. It has a wave-shaped façade to allow light inside more easily, while maintaining privacy. The building was opened in 2007.

Sir Michael James Lighthill, FRS (1924–1998) was an applied mathematician who is known for his pioneering work in the field of aeroacoustics. He was the Lucasian Professor of Mathematics at Cambridge University, a chair he held until 1979, when he was succeeded by Stephen Hawking. Lighthill then became Provost of University College London, a post he held until 1989. James Lighthill House is named in his honour.

== Nutford House ==
Nutford House in Marble Arch was built in 1916 and was acquired by the University of London in 1949, after which it was expanded to take in five terraced houses in Brown Street, known as the Annexe and one house in Seymour Place. Accommodation is provided for 199 men and women students in 157 single and 21 twin rooms. No smoking is permitted in the hall.

Nutford House has a total of 156 single rooms, and 21 shared rooms across the main hall, annexe and Seymour Place. The warden for many years was the sole surviving relative of Howard Carter, the discoverer of Tutankhamun's tomb. He signed the death certificate (last seen on display at the 1992 British Museum's exhibit of Carter's career before Tutankhamun).

The hall has a TV room, a common room, a games room, a music room, a study room, a bicycle shed and a small private garden usually open from 9 a.m. till 10:30 p.m. The Hall also has a two laundry rooms (one in the Main House, one in the Annexe) and a number of small tea kitchens.

== Others ==
- Arthur Tattersall House (115–131 Gower Street)
- Astor College (99 Charlotte Street)
- Campbell House East and West (Taviton Street)
- Goldsmid House (36 Gillingham Street)
- Ifor Evans & Max Rayne Student Residences (109 Camden Road)
- Frances Gardner House and Langton Close (Gray's Inn Road)
- John Adams Hall (15–23 Endsleigh Street)
- John Tovell House (89 & 93–7 Gower Street)
- John Dodgson House (Bidborough Street)
- Max Rayne House, 109 Camden Road, London, NW1 9HZ
- New Hall (465 Caledonian Road)
- One Pool Street (1 Pool Street)
- Prankerd House (195 North Gower Street)
- Ramsay Hall and Ian Baker House Student Residences (Maple Street)
- Schafer House Student Residence (Drummond Street)
- St Pancras Way (11–13 St Pancras Way)
- Canterbury Hall, Commonwealth Hall, College Hall, Connaught Hall, Hughes Parry Hall and International Hall near Russell Square in Bloomsbury
- Lillian Penson Hall in Paddington

There is limited UCL accommodation available for married students and those with children at Bernard Johnson House, Hawkridge, Neil Sharp House and the University of London's Lilian Penson Hall.
