= Royal Exchange, Manchester =

Listed building in Manchester, England

Coordinates: 53.4825°N 2.2444°W

Royal Exchange
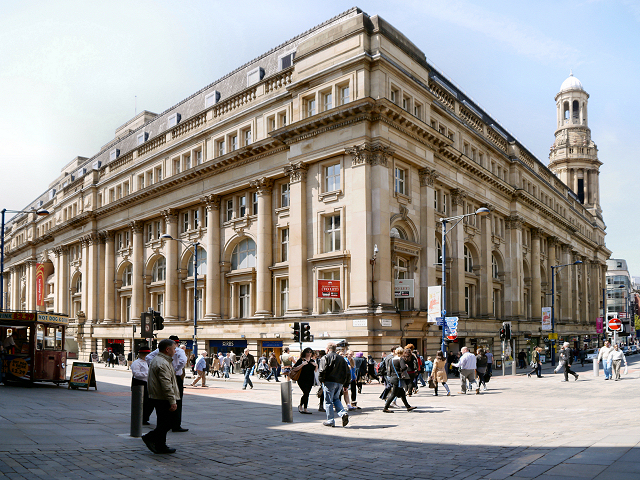
- Exterior of the Royal Exchange

General information
- Architectural style: Classical style. Baroque turret at north-west corner.
- Location: Manchester, England
- Construction started: 1867
- Completed: 1921; 105 years ago

Design and construction
- Architect: Bradshaw, Gass and Hope

Listed Building – Grade II
- Official name: Royal Exchange
- Designated: 3 October 1974
- Reference no.: 1200826

The Royal Exchange is a grade II listed building in Manchester, England. It is located in the city centre. The complex includes the Royal Exchange Theatre and the Royal Exchange Shopping Centre.

== History, 1729 to 1973 ==
The cotton industry in Lancashire was served by the cotton importers and brokers based in Liverpool who supplied Manchester and surrounding towns with the raw material needed to spin yarns and produce finished textiles. The Liverpool Cotton Exchange traded in imported raw cotton. In the 18th century, the trade was part of the slave trade in which African slaves were transported to America where the cotton was grown and then exported to Liverpool where the raw cotton was sold. The raw cotton was processed in Manchester and the surrounding cotton towns and Manchester Royal Exchange traded in spun yarn and finished goods throughout the world including Africa. Manchester's first exchange opened in 1729 but closed by the end of the century.

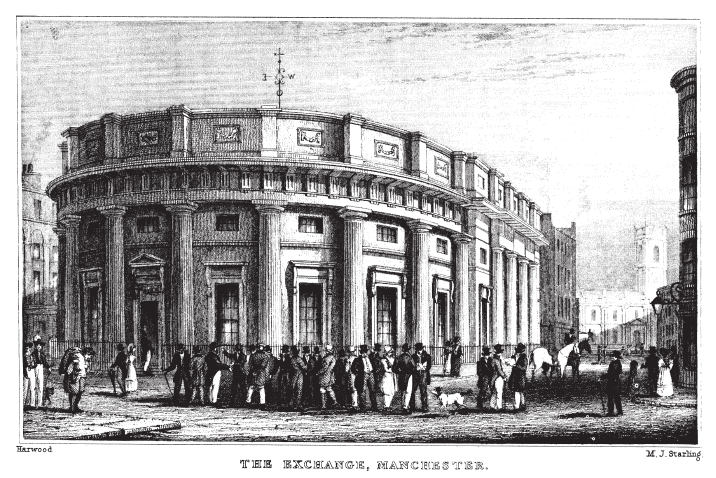
The Manchester Exchange in 1835 (the second exchange before it was enlarged in 1849)

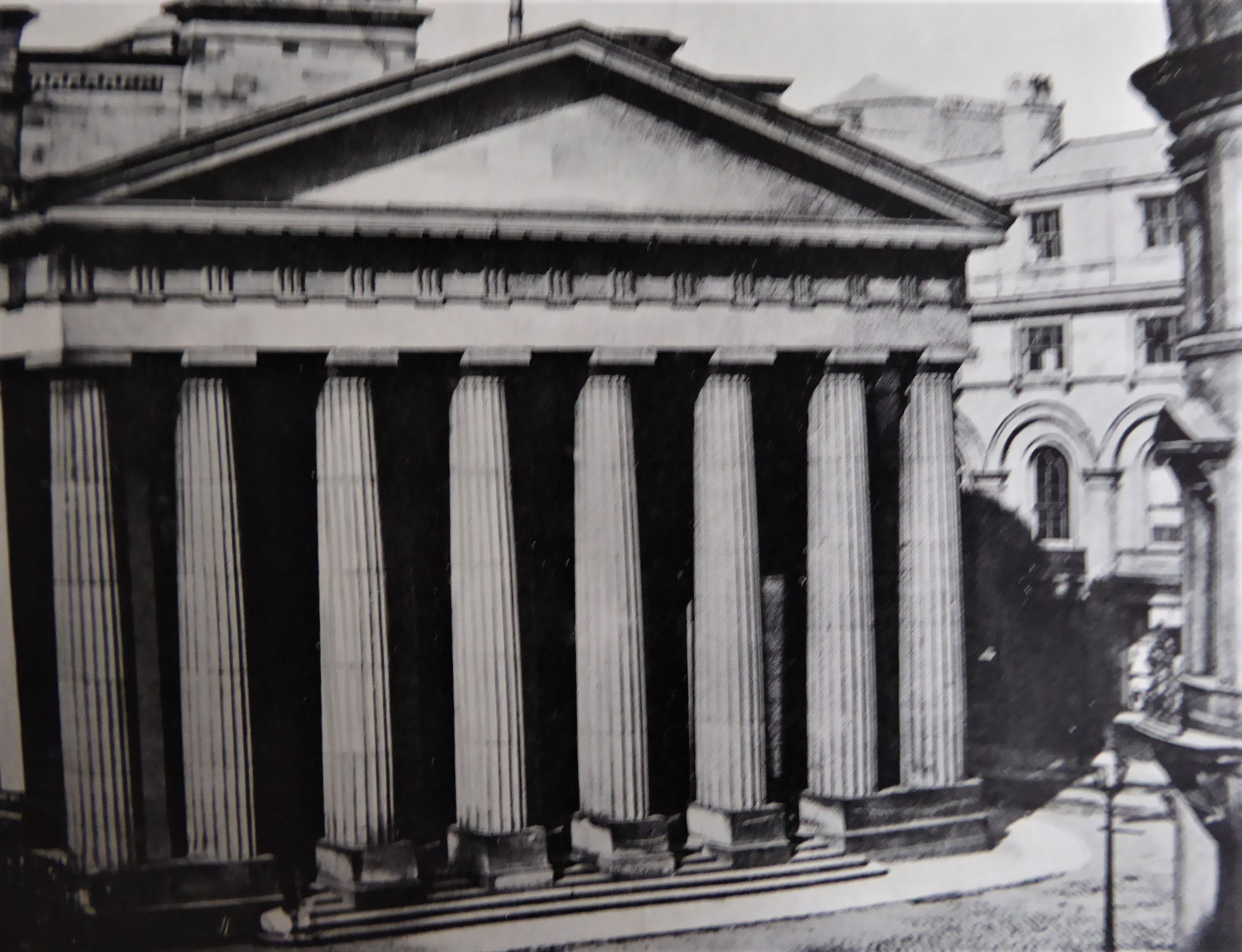
The Manchester Exchange in 1859 (the second exchange after it was enlarged in 1849)

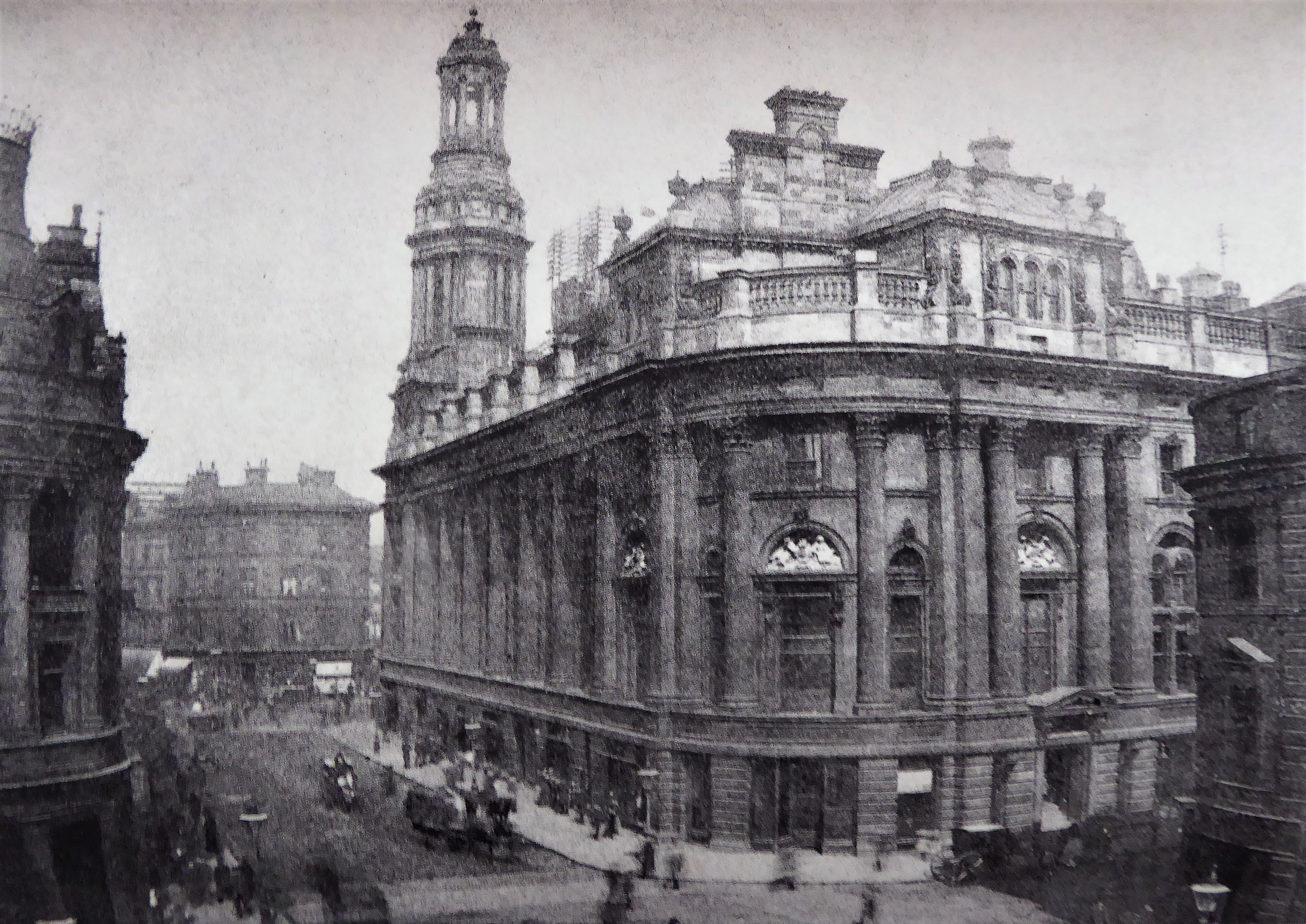
The Royal Exchange in 1891 (the third exchange)

As the cotton industry boomed, the need for a new exchange was recognised. Thomas Harrison designed the second exchange, completed in 1809, at the junction of Market Street and Exchange Street. Harrison designed the exchange in the Classical style. It had two storeys above a basement and was constructed in Runcorn stone. The cost, £20,000, was paid for in advance by 400 members who bought £50 shares and paid £30 each to buy the site. The semi-circular north façade had fluted Doric columns. The exchange room where business was conducted covered 812 square yards. The ground floor also contained the members' library with more than 15,000 books. The basement housed a newsroom lit by a dome and plate-glass windows, its ceiling was supported by a circle of Ionic pillars spaced 15 feet (4.6 m) from the walls. The first-floor dining-room was accessed by a geometrical staircase. The exchange opened to celebrate the birthday of George III in 1809. It also contained other anterooms and offices.

As the cotton trade continued to expand, larger premises were required and its extension was completed in 1849. The design featured a huge new Doric order portico. The Exchange was run by a committee of notable Manchester industrialists. From 1855 to 1860, the committee was chaired by Edmund Buckley.

The second exchange was replaced by a third designed by Mills & Murgatroyd, constructed between 1867 and 1874. It was extended and modified by Bradshaw Gass & Hope between 1914 and 1931 to form the largest trading hall in England. In order to maximise the internal space, these modifications required the demolition of a huge Corinthian order portico on the Cross Street frontage which had former part of the Mills & Murgatroyd design. The trading hall had three domes and was double the size of the current hall. The colonnade parallel to Cross Street marked its centre. On trading days merchants and brokers struck deals which supported the jobs of tens of thousands of textile workers in Manchester and the surrounding towns. Manchester's cotton dealers and manufacturers trading from the Royal Exchange earned the city the name, Cottonopolis.

The exchange was seriously damaged during the Second World War when it took a direct hit from a bomb during a German air raid in the Manchester Blitz at Christmas in 1940. Its interior was rebuilt with a smaller trading area. The top stages of the clock tower, which had been destroyed, were replaced in a simpler form. Trading ceased in 1968, and the building was threatened with demolition.

== Architecture ==
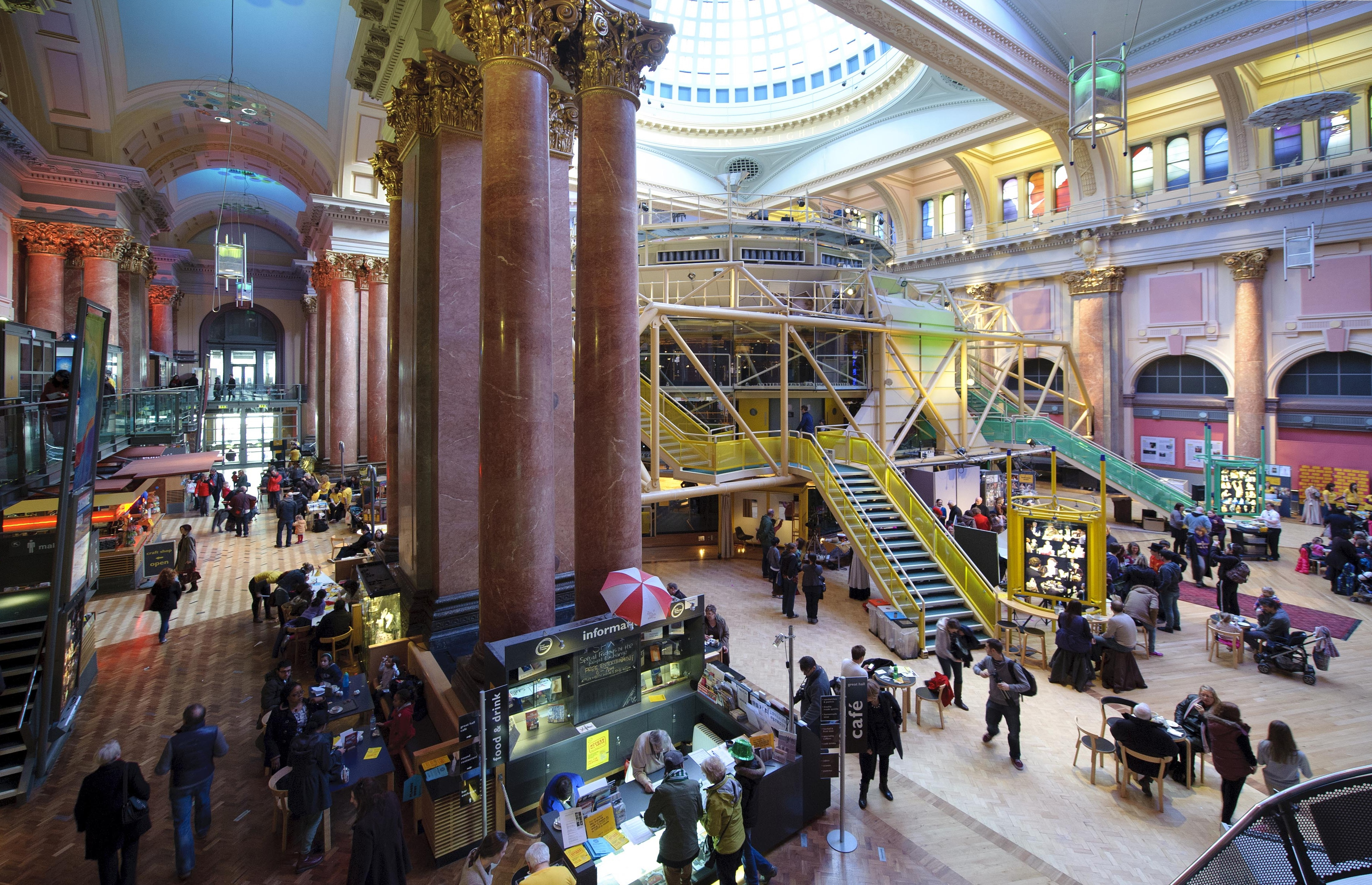
View towards the arches and theatre in the Great Central Hall

The exchange has four storeys and two attic storeys built on a rectangular plan in Darley Dale stone. It was designed in the Classical style. Its slate roof has three glazed domes and on the ground floor an arcade orientated east to west. It has a central atrium at first-floor level. The ground floor facade has channelled rusticated piers and the first, second and third floors have Corinthian columns with entablature and a modillioned cornice. The first attic storey has a balustraded parapet while the second attic storey has a mansard roof. At the north-west corner is a Baroque turret and there are domes over other corners. The west side has a massive round-headed entrance arch with wide steps up and the first and second floor windows have round-headed arches. The third floor and first attic storey have mullioned windows.

== Theatre ==
The building remained empty until 1973, when it was used to house a theatre company (69 Theatre Company); the company performed in a temporary theatre but there were plans for a permanent theatre whose cost was then estimated at £400,000. The Royal Exchange Theatre was founded in 1976 by five artistic directors: Michael Elliott, Caspar Wrede, Richard Negri, James Maxwell and Braham Murray. The theatre was opened by Laurence Olivier on 15 September 1976. In 1979, the artistic directorship was augmented by the appointment of Gregory Hersov.

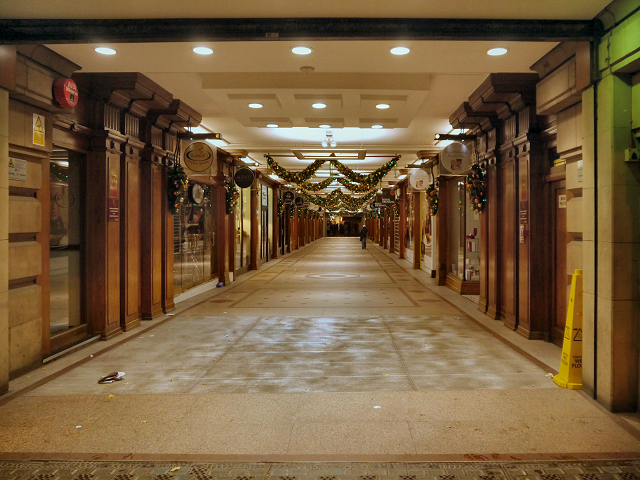
The Royal Exchange Arcade is a public route which passes under the building and contains retail units.

The building was damaged on 15 June 1996 when an IRA bomb exploded in Corporation Street less than 50 yards away. The blast caused the dome to move, although the main structure was undamaged. That the adjacent St Ann's Church survived almost unscathed is probably due to the sheltering effect of the stone-built exchange. Repairs, which were undertaken by Birse Group, took over two years and cost £32 million, a sum provided by the National Lottery. While the exchange was rebuilt, the theatre company performed in Castlefield. The theatre was repaired and provided with a second performance space, the Studio, a bookshop, craft shop, restaurant, bars and rooms for corporate hospitality. The theatre's workshops, costume department and rehearsal rooms were moved to Swan Street. The refurbished theatre was re-opened on 30 November 1998 by Prince Edward. The opening production, Stanley Houghton's Hindle Wakes was the play that should have opened the day the bomb was exploded.

In 1999 the Royal Exchange was awarded "Theatre of the Year" in the Barclays Theatre Awards, in recognition of its refurbishment and ambitious re-opening season.

In January 2016, the Royal Exchange was awarded Regional Theatre of the Year by The Stage. In announcing the award, The Stage said: "This was the year that artistic director Sarah Frankcom really hit her stride at the Royal Exchange. The Manchester theatre in the round's output during 2015 delivered its best year in quite some time."

In January 2018, the Royal Exchange Young Company won the "School of the Year" award at The Stage Awards 2018.

On 28 March 2019, the Royal Exchange announced that Frankcom was stepping down as artistic director of the theatre to take up a new post as director of the prestigious drama school LAMDA. On 8 July 2019, the theatre announced the appointment of Bryony Shanahan and Roy Alexander Weise as joint artistic directors.

=== Theatres ===
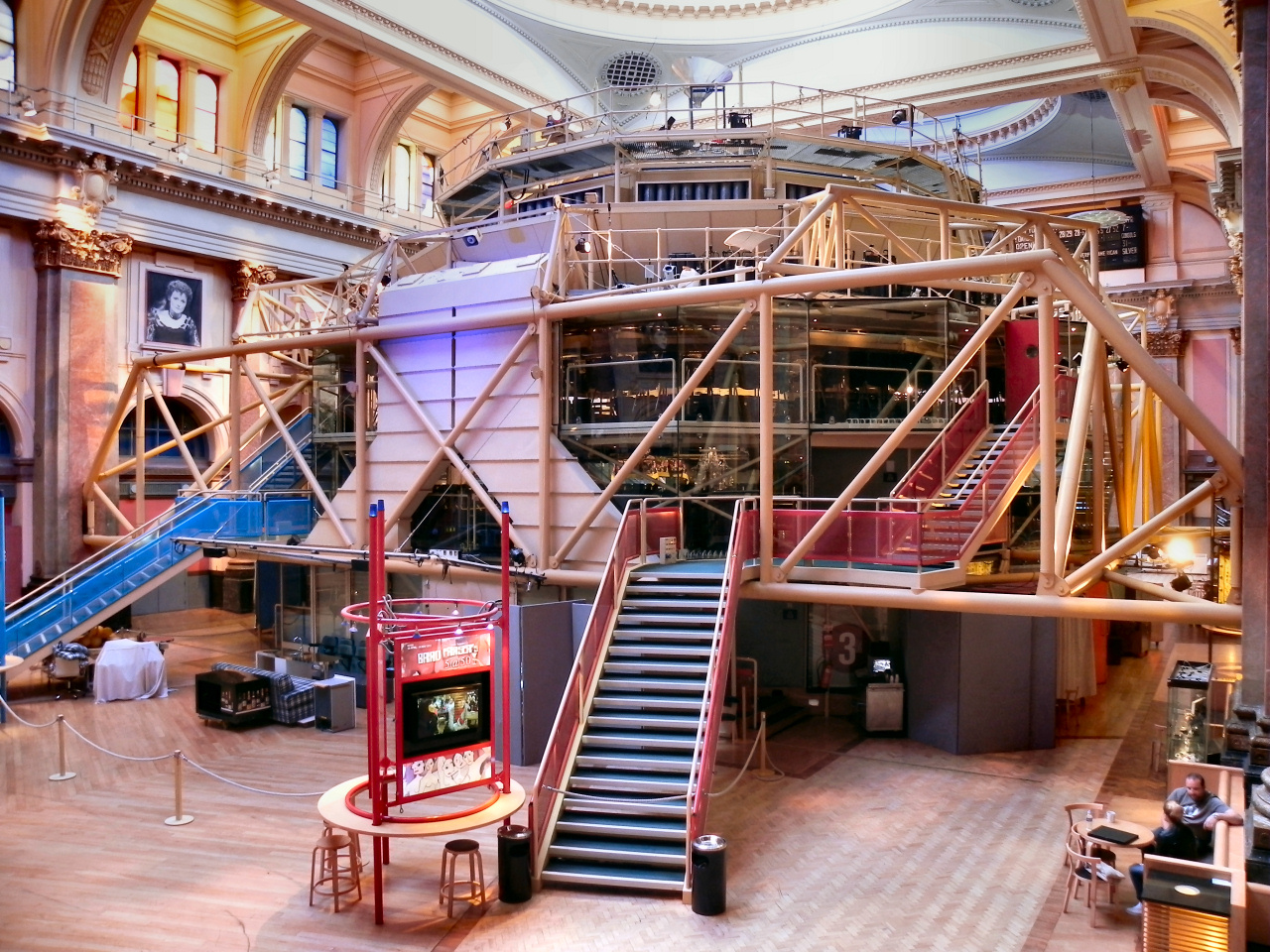
The exterior of the circular theatre pod in the Great Central Hall

The theatre features a seven-sided steel and glass module that squats within the building's Great Hall. It is a pure theatre in the round in which the stage area is surrounded on all sides, and above, by seating. It was designed by Richard Negri of the Wimbledon School of Art and Axel Burrough of Levitt Bernstein. As the floor of the exchange was unable to take the weight of the theatre and its audience, the module is suspended from the four columns carrying the hall's central dome. Only the stage area and ground-level seating rest on the floor. The 150-ton theatre structure opened in 1976 at a cost of £1 million.

The theatre can seat an audience of up to 800 on three levels, making it the largest theatre in the round in the world. There are 400 seats at ground level in a raked configuration, above which are two galleries, each with 150 seats set in two rows.

The Studio is a 90-seat studio theatre with no fixed stage area and moveable seats, allowing for a variety of production styles (in the round, thrust etc.) Prior to 2020, the studio acted as host to a programme of visiting touring theatre companies, stand-up comedians and performances for young people.

==== Theatre programme ====
The company performs a varied programme including classic theatre and revivals, contemporary drama and new writing. Shakespeare, Ibsen and Chekhov have been the mainstay of its repertoire but the theatre has staged classics from other areas of the canon including the British premieres of La Ronde and The Prince of Homburg and revivals of The Lower Depths, Don Carlos and The Dybbuk. American work has also been important – Tennessee Williams, O'Neill, Miller, August Wilson – as has new writing, with the world premieres of The Dresser, Amongst Barbarians, A Wholly Healthy Glasgow and Port to its name.

The Royal Exchange also presents visiting theatre companies in the Studio; folk, jazz and rock concerts; and discussions, readings and literary events. It engages children of all ages in drama activities and groups and has performances including these children and teens. Performances include The Freedom Bird and The Boy Who Ran from the Sea.

=== Notable people ===
The company has been run by a group of artistic directors since its inception. According to Braham Murray: "Although the names have changed we have remained a team of like-minded individuals sharing a common vision of the purpose and potency of theatre." These individuals include

- Michael Elliott (1976–1984)
- James Maxwell (1976–1995)
- Braham Murray (1976–2012)
- Richard Negri (1976–1986)
- Caspar Wrede (1976–1990)
- Greg Hersov (1987–2014)
- Marianne Elliott (1998–2002)
- Matthew Lloyd (1998–2001)
- Sarah Frankcom (2008–2019)
- Bryony Shanahan (2019–2023)
- Roy Alexander Weise (2019–2023)
- Selina Cartmell (2024-present)

In 2014 Sarah Frankcom became the sole artistic director.

Associate artistic directors include Nicholas Hytner (1985–1989), Ian McDiarmid (1986–1988) and Phyllida Lloyd (1990–1991). Other directors who have worked at the Royal Exchange include Lucy Bailey, Michael Buffong, Robert Delamere, Jacob Murray, Adrian Noble, Steven Pimlott and Richard Wilson.

Designers, composers and choreographers have included Lez Brotherston, Johanna Bryant, Chris Monks, Alan Price, Jeremy Sams, Rae Smith and Mark Thomas.

== Controversies ==
In 2017, the Royal Exchange Theatre produced Jubilee, a stage adaptation of Derek Jarman’s film, directed and adapted by playwright Chris Goode. In 2021, Goode died by suicide shortly after being arrested on suspicion of possessing indecent images of children. In response to allegations that his work at Royal Exchange had been marked by abuse, the theatre joined with the Royal Court Theatre to commission an independent inquiry into working practices and safeguarding failures related to Goode's productions. The report concluded that several individuals had been “badly hurt,” and it called for improved safeguarding procedures across the UK theatre sector. Survivors have since called on institutions to acknowledge their role in enabling abusive behavior by failing to act on warning signs.

== See also ==
- Listed buildings in Manchester-M2

== Bibliography ==
- Ashmore, Owen (1969). Industrial Archaeology of Lancashire. David & Charles. ISBN 0-7153-4339-4.
- Hartwell, Clare (2001). Pevsner Architectural Guides: Manchester. London: Penguin Books. ISBN 0-14-071131-7.
- Murray, Braham (2007). The Worst It Can Be Is a Disaster. London: Methuen Drama. ISBN 978-0-7136-8490-2.
- Parkinson-Bailey, John J (2000). Manchester: an Architectural History. Manchester: Manchester University Press. ISBN 0-7190-5606-3.
- Scott, RDH (1976). The Biggest Room in the World: A Short History of the Royal Exchange. Royal Exchange Theatre Trust. ISBN 978-0-85972-033-5.
- The Royal Exchange Theatre Company Words & Pictures 1976–1998. The Royal Exchange Theatre Company Limited. 1998. ISBN 0-9512017-1-9.
