= Sadie Speight =

British architect, designer and writer

Sadie Speight, Lady Martin (26 May 1906 – 23 October 1992), was a British architect, designer and writer, and a leading figure in, and chronicler of, the Modern movement of art, architecture and design in early 20th-century Britain. She was a founding member of the Design Research Unit, wrote books and magazine features on architecture and design, designed products and interiors, and undertook several collaborative architectural commissions with her husband, the architect Leslie Martin. According to her obituary, she "made a contribution in her own right and with her husband to the very best in design today".

== Early life and education ==
Sadie Speight was born in Church Street, Standish, Lancashire, one of two daughters of Alfred Speight, a doctor, and his wife, Mary Annie Urmston. She was educated at St Mary's and St Anne's, Abbots Bromley, and Manchester University, where she graduated with first-class honours from the school of architecture in 1929.

Speight was a Prix de Rome finalist and held a travelling scholarship in 1929, which enabled her to study abroad. In 1930 she received the Royal Institute of British Architects’ silver medal for drawing and was elected an Associate. She held a fellowship at Manchester University in 1932 and gained her master’s degree in 1933. She worked as an architectural assistant to Halliday and Associates in Manchester (1930–34) and then undertook research in Spain as recipient of the RIBA Neale Bursary in 1934.

== The Modern Movement and design journalism ==
Speight met her future husband, Leslie Martin, when they were students at Manchester University. He bought her an engagement ring in 1927, and they married a number of years later, on 3 January 1935. In the 1930s Speight, who continued to work under her own name, and Martin developed a productive partnership designing a number of private houses together, as well as a kindergarten in Cheshire. Perhaps the best known of the houses they jointly designed was Brackenfell, Cumbria (1938; now Grade II-listed), whose client was the textile designer and artist Alastair Morton (1910–1963); the house features a large window over the garage, providing light for his studio.

Along with Martin, Speight also formed friendships with and became part of the group of leading modernist architects, sculptors and artists in Britain, including Ben Nicholson, Barbara Hepworth and Naum Gabo. Other collaborative projects in the 1930s included the design of the Good Form range of modular furniture for W. Rowntree & Sons and the publication of The Flat Book (1939), an advice manual for modern home owners. According to design historian Jill Seddon, Speight’s ‘achievements in product design and shop layout reveal a particular flair for the use of colour and the grouping of objects, which surely owed much to her early contact with the champions of abstract art in Britain’.

Speight also played an important role in British design and architecture journalism in the mid-20th century. In 1943 Nikolaus Pevsner invited her to compile the new 'Design Review' feature of The Architectural Review, a section highlighting contemporary design which ran from 1944 until 1946. At the time, she was '... the only female writer to make a regular contribution during a period when the only permanent female staff working on the magazine occupied administrative or secretarial positions'.

== The Flat Book ==
The Flat Book, which acted as a British catalogue for furniture design, was published in 1939. Although previously only Martin was attributed as the author, Speight co-authored the book. Example precedent works Martin and Speight inserted ranged from their personal works, specifically the "Good Form" Scarborough project, to other 1938 female designers including J. L. Martin and Sadie Speight individually.

== Post-war career ==
Speight was a founder member of the Design Research Unit, which was set up by the Council of Industrial Design to enable designers to make their skills available to industry. With the greater emphasis on high-quality design for mass production, she designed kettles, textiles and electric irons. A collaborative project with Leonard Manasseh, for the Festival of Britain in 1951 was the design of the Rosie Lee cafeteria at the ‘Live Architecture’ exhibition in Lansbury, London. Later work included interiors for Swansea University in the 1950s and Cambridge colleges in the 1960s. She was also involved in planning exhibitions and books about her husband's work. In later life Speight worked on converting an apple store and stables in Norfolk as a retreat. She died on 23 October 1992 in Great Shelford, Cambridgeshire.
