= William Stone Building =

Residential building in Cambridge, England

Coordinates: 52.1988°N 0.1199°E

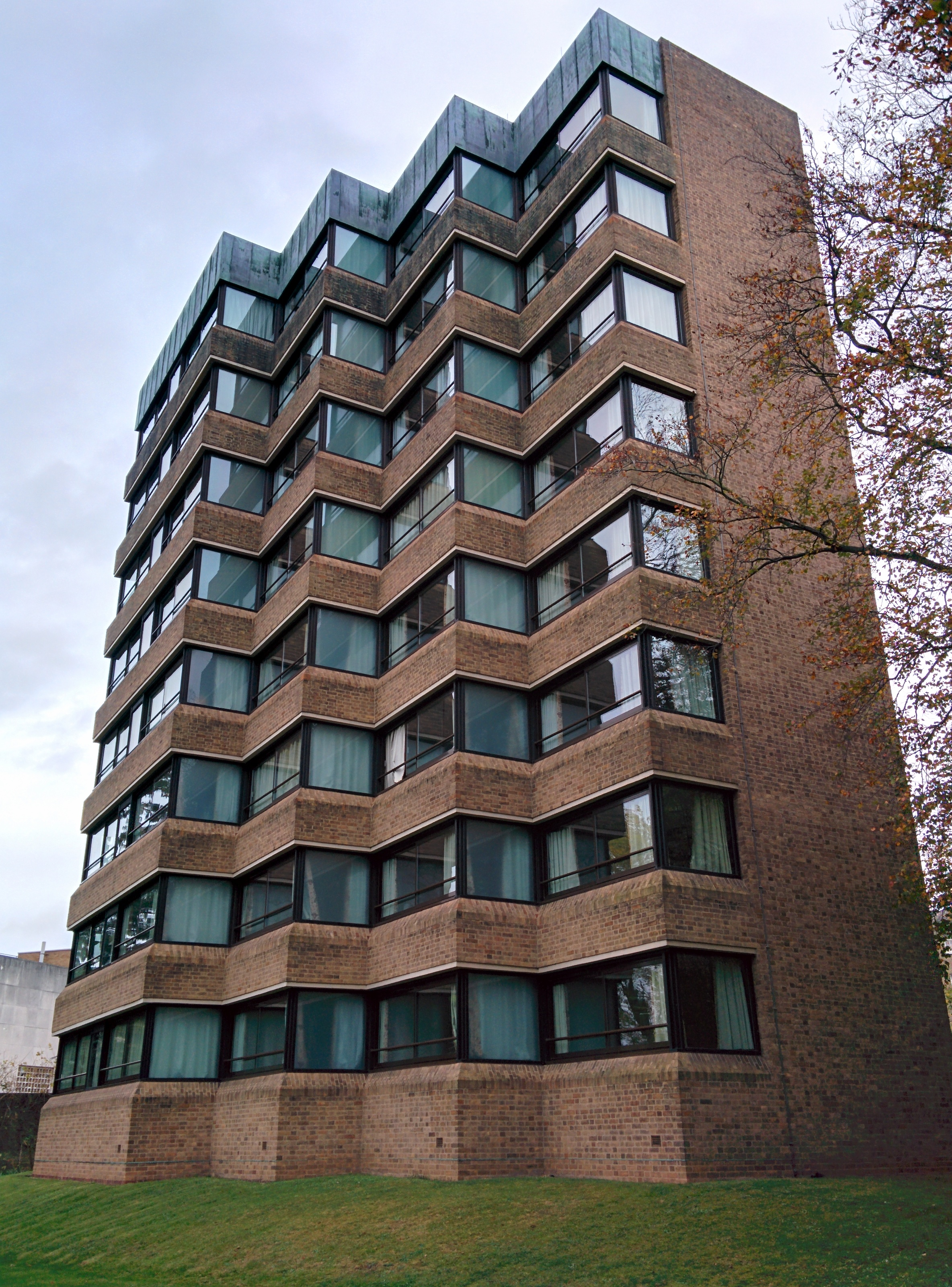
William Stone Building, Peterhouse, Cambridge

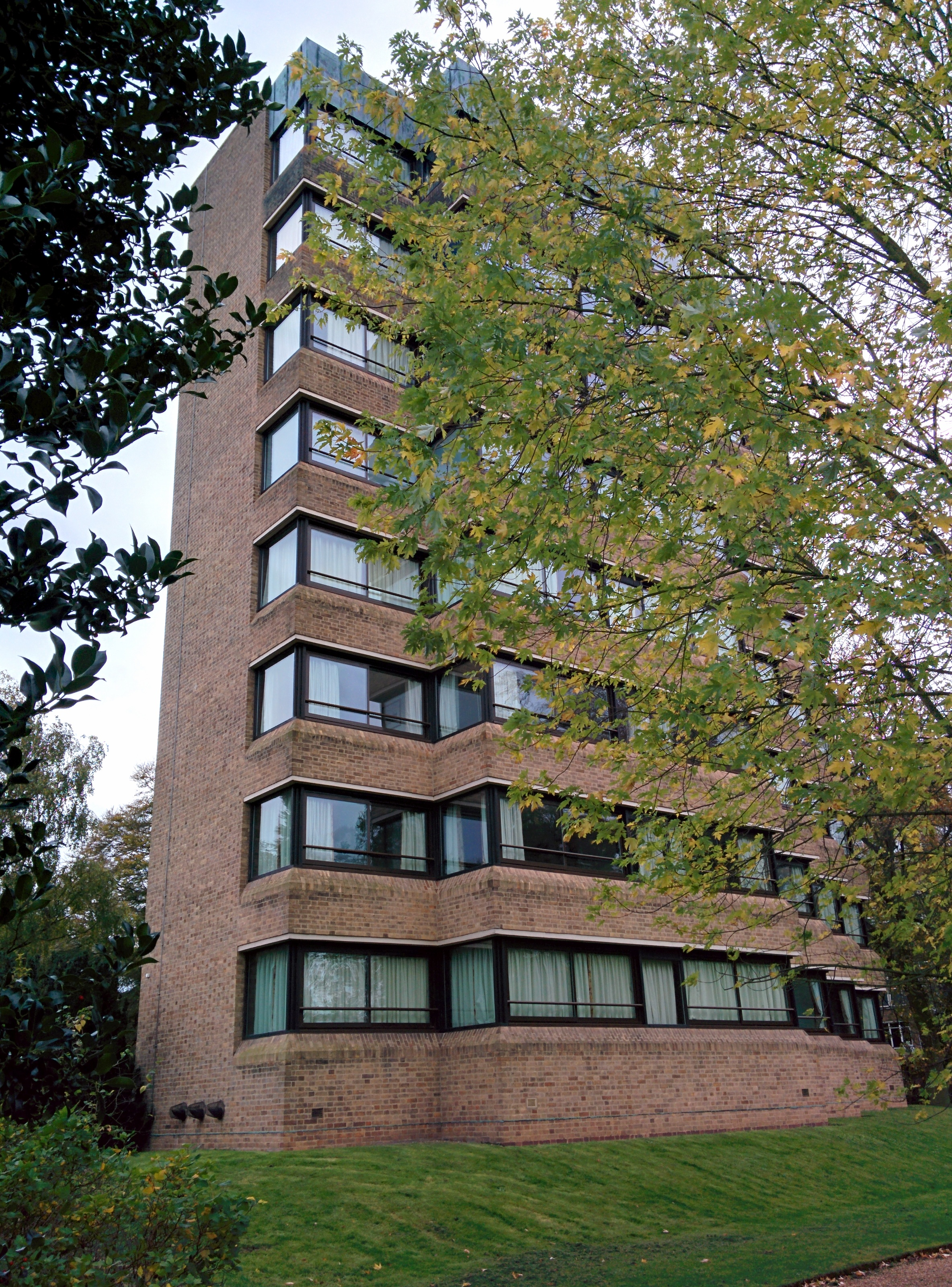
William Stone Building, Peterhouse, Cambridge

The William Stone Building is a residential structure within the grounds of Peterhouse, Cambridge, one of the constituent colleges of the University of Cambridge. It was recognised as a Grade II listed building in March 1993.

The William Stone Building comprises residential accommodation for eight fellows and 24 students of Peterhouse. It was constructed during 1963-64 to a design by Leslie Martin and Colin St John Wilson that was influenced by the work of Alvar Aalto. The March 1993 Grade II listing details describe it:

Buff brick; copper cladding. Flat roof. Irregular plan with staggered rooms, facing west. Eight storeys. Horizontal strip windows with bull-nosed cills. Varnished timber frames. Copper sheet cladding above top storey window. Elevation to east has expressed rectangular staircase and lift tower rising above roof line and narrow horizontal strip windows.

The building is 102 feet (31 m) high on a 71 feet (22 m) by 42 feet (13 m) Aalto-inspired staggered ground plan. The construction cost of £100,000 was funded by a bequest from William Stone (1857-1958), a former member of the college. The original design was later amended to provide privacy for its occupants, who had found that they could see into each other's rooms from their windows; it still retains appealing views of the surrounding area. It was refurbished in 2007-08, when solar panels were also installed on the roof.

The structure is the only tower-style student accommodation in the university and as of 2009 it was the de facto standard regarding planning decisions related to the maximum height of new developments in the city. The college describes it as "interesting historically as a belated and solitary example in Cambridge of the impact of Corbusier's fantasies of the 1920s of high-rise living for modern man".
