= Leslie Martin =

English architect (1908–2000)

Sir Leslie Martin
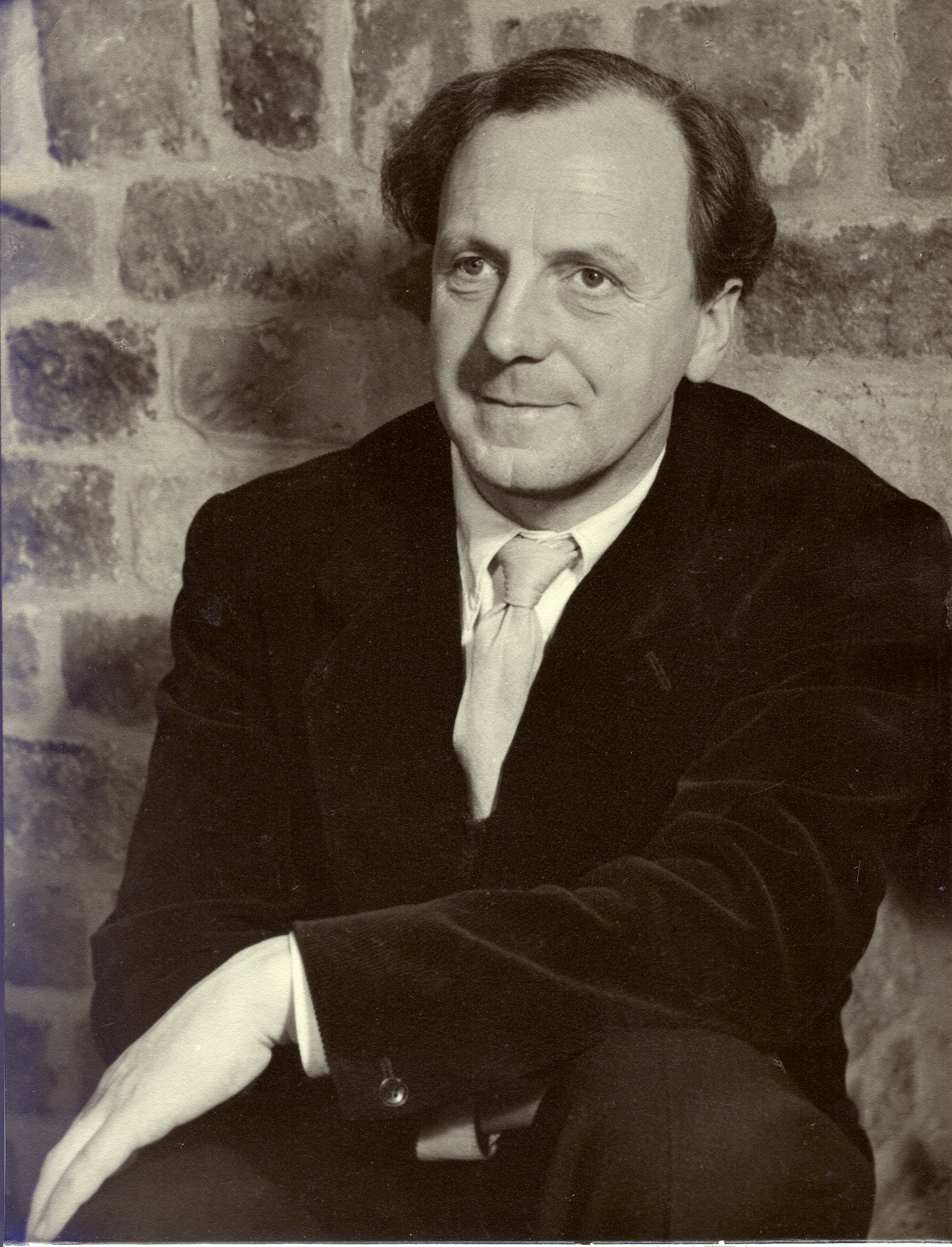
- Born: John Leslie Martin; 17 August 1908; Manchester, England
- Died: 28 July 2000 (aged 91)
- Education: Manchester University
- Occupation: Architect
- Spouse: Sadie Speight
- Buildings: Royal Festival Hall, Harvey Court, William Stone Building, Tinbergen Building, Brackenfell, Kettle's Yard extension
- Projects: Loughborough Estate

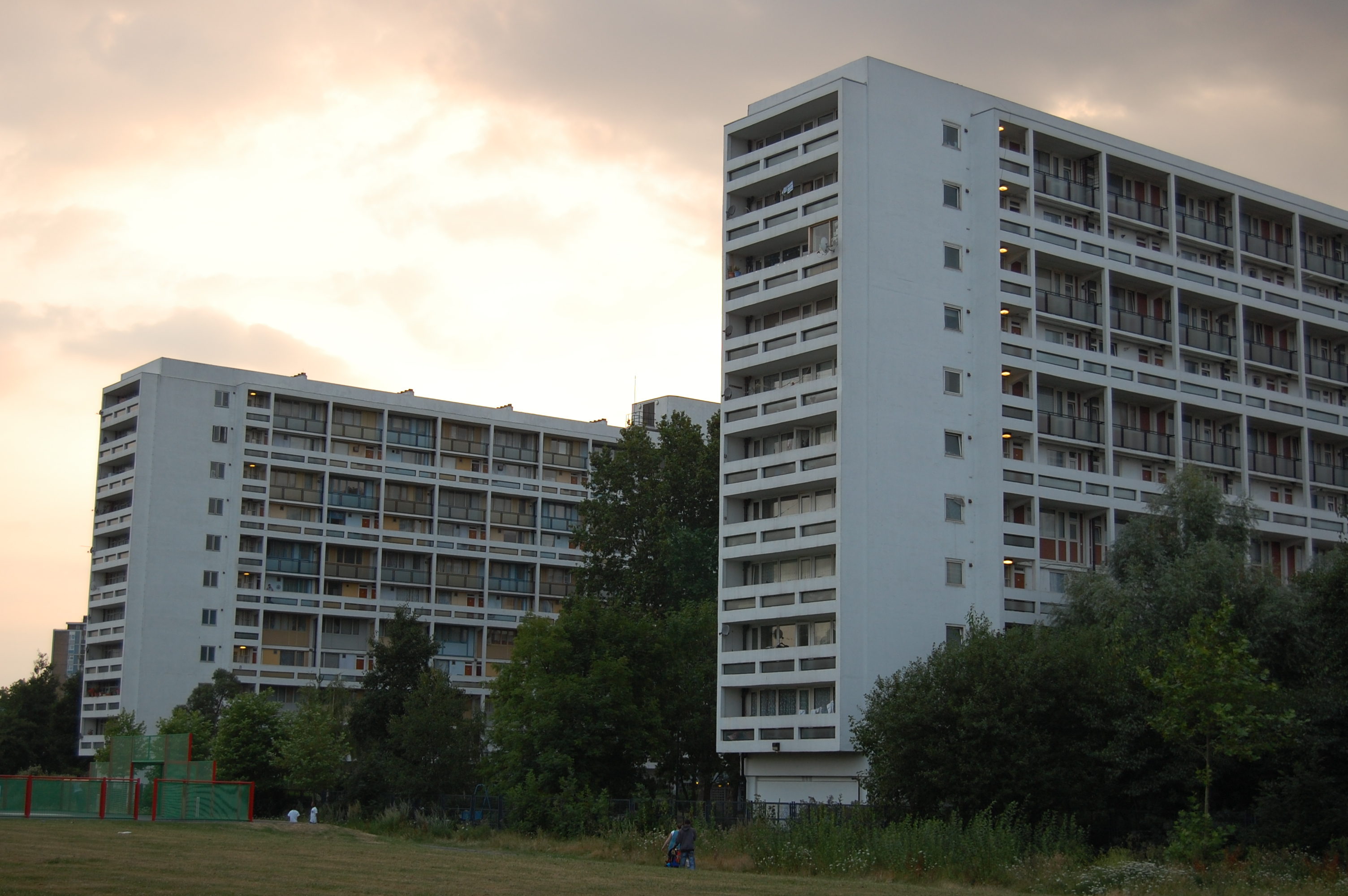
The Loughborough Estate in Brixton

Sir John Leslie Martin (17 August 1908, in Manchester – 28 July 2000) was an English architect, and a leading advocate of the International Style. Martin's most famous building is the Royal Festival Hall. His work was especially influenced by Alvar Aalto.

== Life ==
After studying at Manchester University, Leslie Martin taught at the University of Hull. In 1937 he co-edited with Ben Nicholson and Naum Gabo the journal Circle, which reviewed avant-garde abstract art and architecture. In 1939 Martin and his wife, Sadie Speight, co-wrote The flat book.

During the Second World War Martin was assigned to the pre-nationalisation Railway companies to supervise re-building of bomb-damaged regional rail stations.

In this capacity Martin developed pre-fabricated designs to speed construction. Following the war he was made a Deputy Architect to the London County Council (LCC), and in 1948 Hugh Casson selected him to lead the design team for the Royal Festival Hall, the most prestigious building project of the Festival of Britain. Partly in recognition of his achievement, Martin was made Chief Architect of the LCC in 1953; he used his position to promote emerging younger architects Colin St. John Wilson, James Stirling, and Alison and Peter Smithson.

From 1956, he was made head of the Architecture School at Cambridge University where Colin St John Wilson was his assistant. He was Slade Professor of Fine Art at the University of Oxford for 1965–66.

== Planning work ==
Martin was involved initially with Patrick Hodgkinson in the Brunswick Centre, an early experiment in planned mixed-use development in Bloomsbury that was partially completed. The 1950s also saw the creation of the Loughborough Estate in Brixton, south London, designed by Martin.

In the 1960s the British government commissioned Martin to draw plans for a wholesale demolition and redevelopment of the area between St James's Park and the Thames Embankment in London. It would have involved the demolition of most of the Victorian and Edwardian government offices (the Foreign Office, the Commonwealth Office, the old Home Office, etc.) in Whitehall, which were then scheduled for demolition, and left the Banqueting Hall as a traffic island and the original Scotland Yard building enveloped in the middle of a courtyard of offices.

The plans met with determined opposition from the public and conservation groups, especially the Victorian Society, and their implementation was delayed. Edward Heath's government eventually formally abandoned Martin's plan in 1971. The existing buildings were subsequently restored and opened to the public.

Taking a broader view of Martin's work, a picture emerges of the man as a quiet achiever par excellence. Through his skilled networking in support of promising younger architects, and his self-effacing work on committees, he strongly influenced the course of post-war British architecture. "He was efficient, cooperative, impeccably well networked and calmly authoritative, justifying his advice with his immense architectural expertise and his scientific investigations of planning needs."

== Architectural commissions ==
Martin with Wilson completed a number of academic buildings including halls of residence Harvey Court for Gonville and Caius College, one of the most important examples of brick brutalism, and the William Stone Building for Peterhouse; and the Tinbergen Building and the St. Cross faculty libraries for Oxford University. Martin was also the masterplanner for Leicester University.

One of his later projects was an extension to Kettle's Yard Art Gallery to house the works of Dame Barbara Hepworth, Ben Nicholson, and others.

Martin and his wife, Sadie Speight, were responsible for the modernist house Brackenfell (Grade II listed) in Brampton, Cumbria. Designed in 1936 and completed in 1938 for textile designer and artist Alastair Morton, of Edinburgh Weavers. The interior colour scheme was reputedly designed by Ben Nicholson who lived locally when married to Winifred Roberts. Brackenfell is still a private house.

== Recognition ==
Martin was knighted by Queen Elizabeth II in the 1957 Birthday Honours.
