= Patrick Hodgkinson =

British architect

Patrick Hodgkinson (8 March 1930 – 21 February 2016) was a British architect, best known for his design of London's Brunswick Centre.

== Biography ==
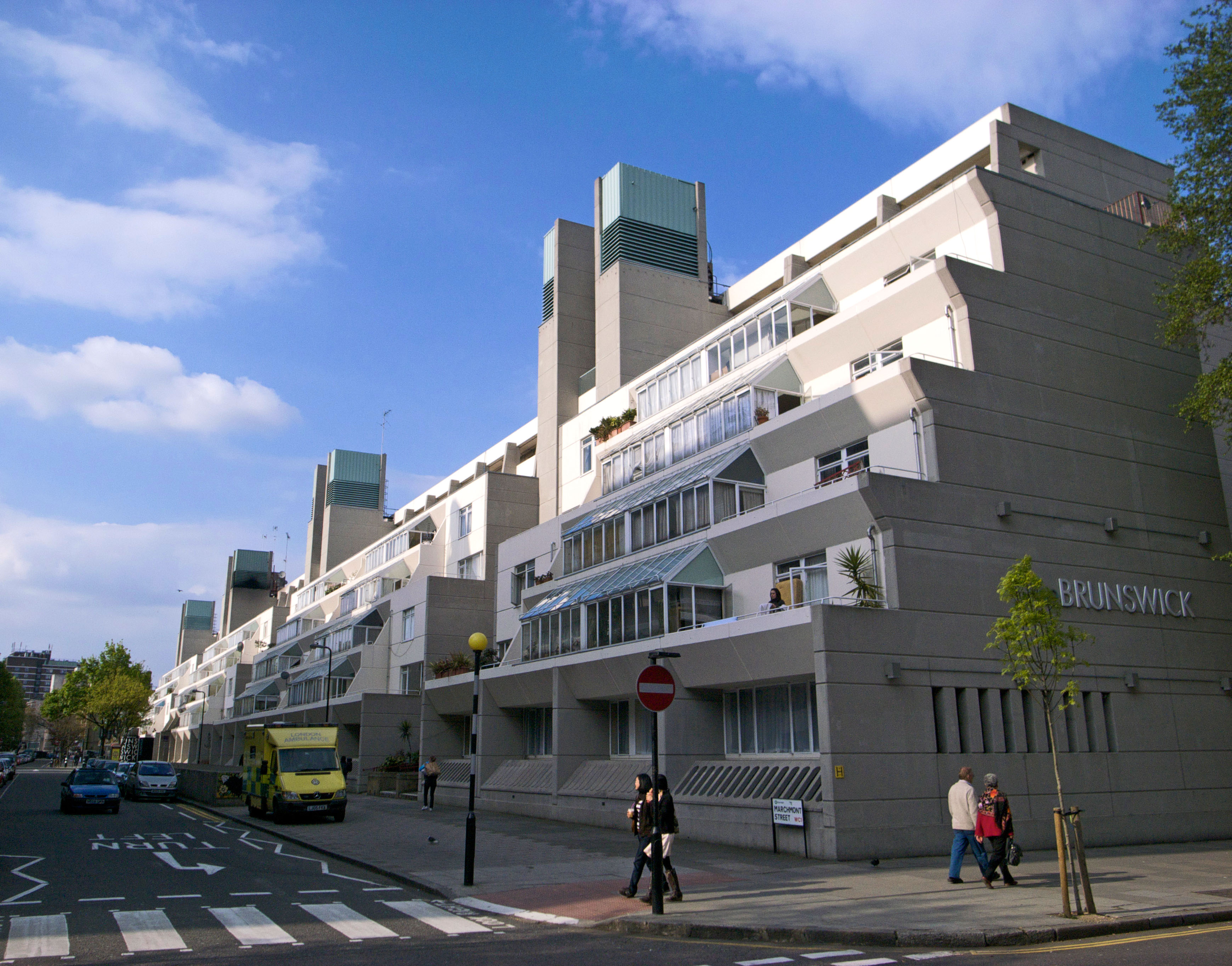
Brunswick Centre, Hodgkinson's best known work

Hodgkinson was born in Putney, London on 8 March 1930. His father, Geoffrey Walter Hodgkinson was a farmer and car sale company manager and his mother was Patricia Florence Nena Vere, née Denning.

As a child he lived at Little Blakenham, Suffolk and Aldeby, Norfolk. After leaving Orwell Park preparatory school, he went to Charterhouse in Godalming, Surrey then Norwich School of Art.

For Hodgkinson's National Service he joined the Royal Navy. In 1950 he began his studies at the Architectural Association school in London and began working for Neville Ward & Felix Samuely.

In 1957, Hodgkinson joined Leslie Martin and was given the project of designing the Foundling Estate, Bloomsbury in 1964 and Gonville & Caius’s Harvey Court hall of residence.

Hodgkinson designed the Brunswick Centre, a residential and commercial building in Bloomsbury, London He was awarded a chair at Bath University, which he retired from in 1995.

On 17 December 1955 he had his first marriage to fellow student, Anna Margaret Tomlinson and they had two children together. His second marriage was to Jacqueline Metcalf on 27 April 1973 and they also had two children together before they separated some time later. On 21 February 2016, Hodgkinson died as a result of bronchopneumonia and chronic obstructive pulmonary disease at St Teresa's nursing home in Corston, Bath.
