= Brunswick Centre =

Residential and shopping centre in London

Coordinates: 51.524°N 0.124°W

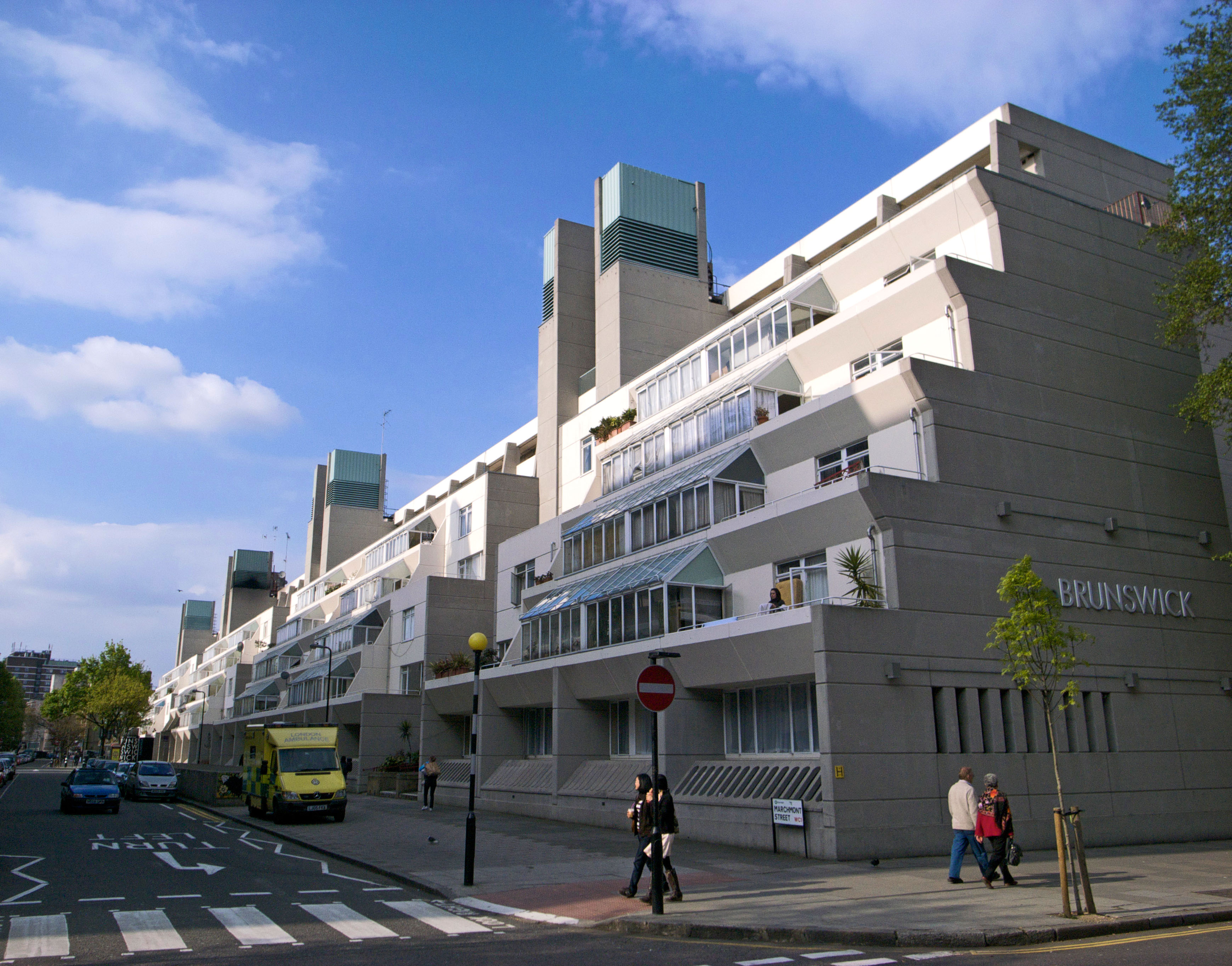
- The Brunswick Centre tiered flats, with ventilation towers
- Interactive map of Brunswick Centre

General information
- Area: Bloomsbury

Construction
- Constructed: 1967-1972
- Architect: Patrick Hodgkinson
- Influence: Leslie Martin

Refurbishment
- Refurbished: 2002-2006

Listing
- Listed: 2000
- Listed as: Grade II

Other information
- Governing body: Camden Council

The Brunswick Centre is a grade II listed residential and shopping centre in Bloomsbury, London, England. It is located between Brunswick Square and Russell Square and is administratively in the London Borough of Camden.

== Planning and design ==
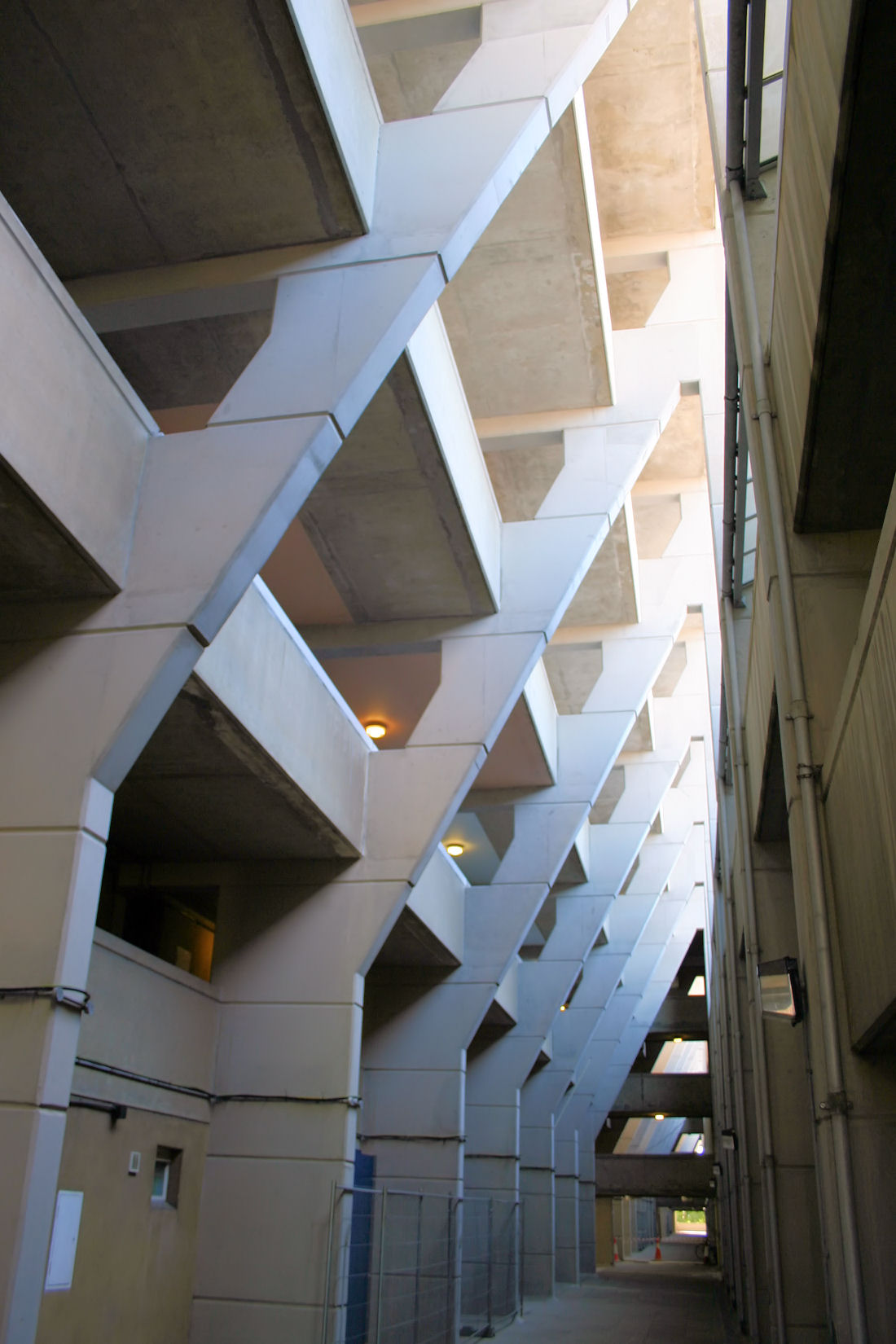
Second floor view of the interior concrete structure

The centre replaced streets of run-down Georgian era terrace housing. It was designed by Patrick Hodgkinson in the mid-1960s, based on studies by Leslie Martin. It was initially planned as a private development at a time when private, mixed-use development in the UK was rare. Building started in 1967 and was completed in 1972, though the building fell some way short of its intended size. The original plan extended up to Euston Road but the Ministry of Defence would not release the site of a building they leased for use by the Territorial Army (and that still stands next to the Centre today).

After failing to attract sufficient private buyers on time, the residential section was leased to the London Borough of Camden for use as council housing, while the developer retained ownership of the structure and shopping areas. The exterior of the building was never painted because the Borough could not afford to complete work on the building after they took control. In Hodgkinson's design, the blocks would have been painted cream, a shade typical of the Georgian period, as a homage to the terraced houses that previously stood on the site and those that still surround it.

== 21st century ==
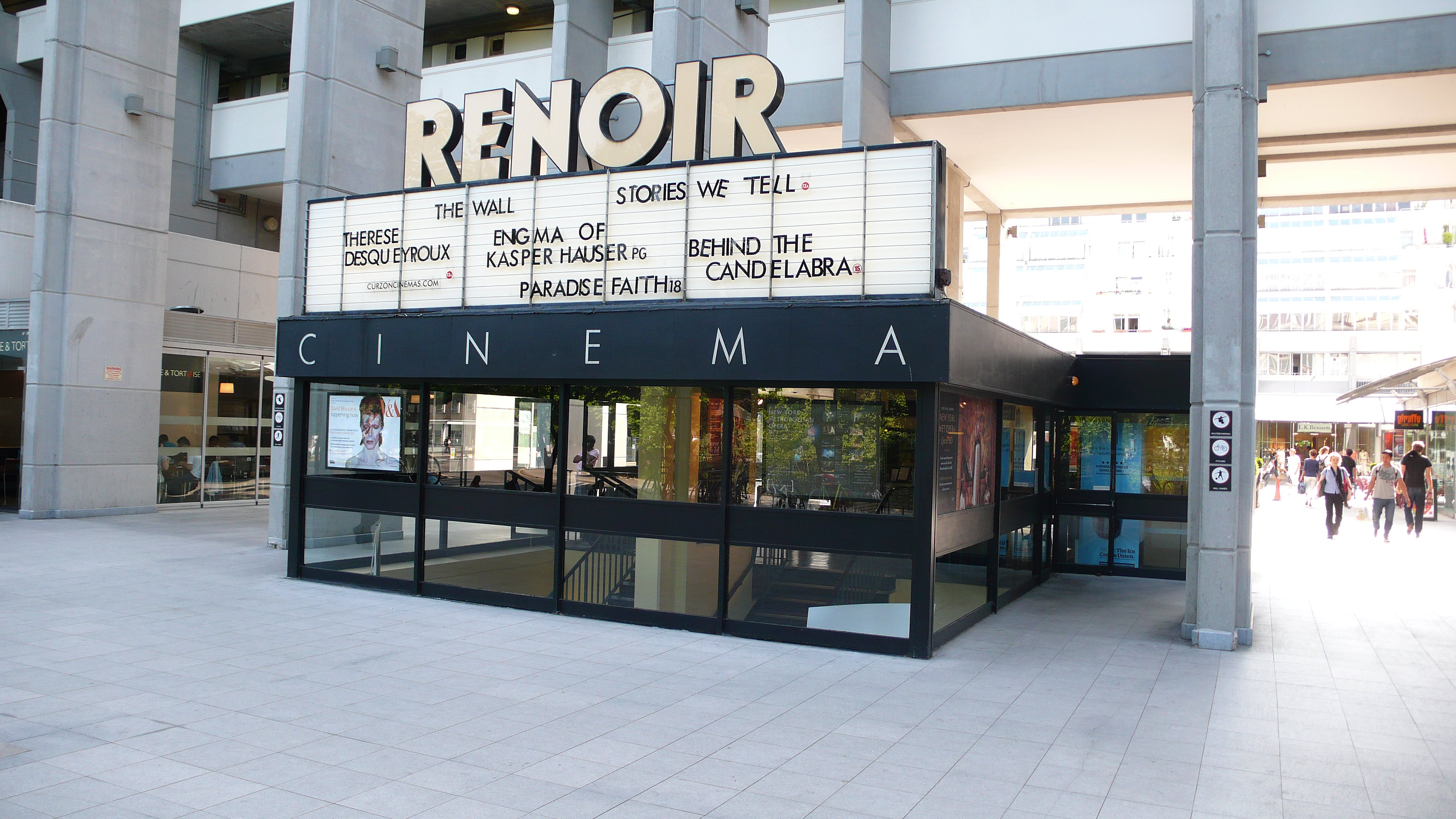
The Renoir cinema

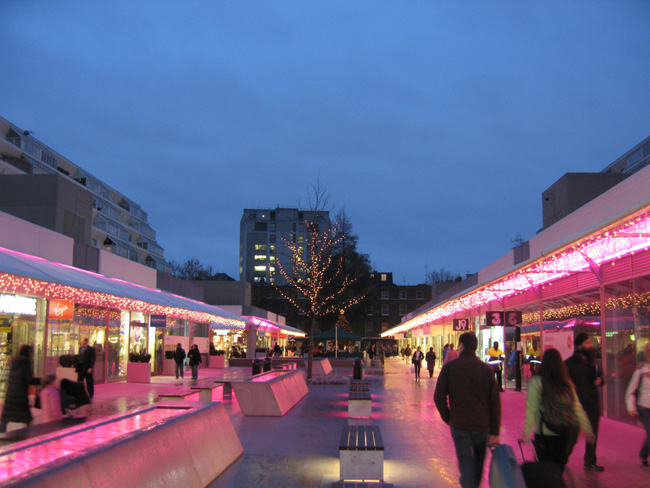
Shopping arcade of The Brunswick in December 2006

Despite being widely disliked by those who are unsympathetic to modernist architecture, it was listed Grade II on the National Heritage List for England in 2000. By this time, however, many of its shop premises were unoccupied. Plans for renovation had repeatedly been blocked by residents' committees but in November 2002, the £22 million project began. This included the painting of the blocks in their originally-planned colour and the commissioning of artist Susanna Heron to introduce water features to the central space. The major work was completed in late 2006 with the opening of branches of several high street chain stores and restaurants. The dual management has caused problems though, as the landlord restored the structure of the estate but the council is responsible for maintenance of the residential properties – so while the concrete structure was restored, the windows remained untouched, detracting from the overall aesthetic of the development. In 2007, the council started work on replacing the windows.

Now referring to itself as The Brunswick, the centre contains 560 flats, various shops, cafés and restaurants, a Waitrose supermarket, and a Curzon cinema.

== Appearances in popular culture ==
The centre is often used as a location for films, TV, photography and music videos including Alexei Sayle's Stuff, The Comic Strip, Crime Traveller, Gangster No. 1, the BBC's skateboarders trailer and Egg Card's guinea pig advertisement.

- Jack Nicholson strolls along the concourse and down the main staircase (now demolished) in the 1975 film The Passenger.
- The 2022 series set in the Star Wars universe Andor filmed Coruscant scenes at the centre.
- Mansun's music video for "Wide Open Space" was filmed at the centre.
- Lodger wrote a song dedicated to the building.
- It was featured in the Tumbler ident in 2005 which was used as part of BBC One's Rhythm & Movement ident set from 2002 to 2006.

== See also ==
- Alexandra Road estate – of similar ziggurat design by Neave Brown
- Balfron Tower
- St George's Fields (Bayswater)
