= Axel Burrough =

English architect (1946–2026)

Hedley Axel Burrough (18 November 1946 – 29 January 2026) was an English architect and director at Levitt Bernstein, known for his work on arts and cultural buildings in the United Kingdom.
