= Death on the Rocks =

- The Avengers episode
- Episode no.: Season 2 Episode 10
- Directed by: Jonathan Alwyn
- Written by: Eric Paice
- Production code: 3512
- Original air date: 1 December 1962

Guest appearances
- Meier Tzelniker; Gerald Cross; Ellen McIntosh; Naomi Chance; Hamilton Dyce

Episode chronology
← Previous "The Sell-Out"	Next → "Traitor in Zebra"

"Death on the Rocks" is the tenth episode of the second series of the 1960s cult British spy-fi television series The Avengers, starring Patrick Macnee and Honor Blackman. It was first broadcast by ABC on 1 December 1962. The episode was directed by Jonathan Alwyn and written by Eric Paice.

== Plot ==
Steed and Cathy investigate a gang of criminals who are flooding the market with smuggled diamonds.

== Cast ==
- Patrick Macnee as John Steed
- Honor Blackman as Cathy Gale
- Meier Tzelniker as Samuel Ross
- Gerald Cross as Fenton
- Ellen McIntosh as Liza Denham
- Naomi Chance as Mrs. Daniels
- Hamilton Dyce as Max Daniels
- David Sumner as Nicky
- Richard Clarke as Van Berg
- Toni Gilpin as Jackie Ross
- Doug Robinson as Sid
- Annette Kerr as Mrs. Ross
- Haydn Ward as Painter
- Jack Grossman as Diamond Dealer
- Vincent Charles as Diamond Dealer
