= Death Dispatch =

- The Avengers episode
- Episode no.: Season 2 Episode 13
- Directed by: Jonathan Alwyn
- Written by: Leonard Fincham
- Production code: 3503
- Original air date: 22 December 1962

Guest appearances
- Richard Warner; David Cargill; Valerie Sarruf; Douglas Muir; Gerald Harper; Hedger Wallace

Episode chronology
| ← Previous "The Big Thinker" | Next → "Dead on Course" |

"Death Dispatch" is the thirteenth episode of the second season of the 1960s British spy-fi television series The Avengers, starring Patrick Macnee and Honor Blackman. It was first broadcast by ABC on 22 December 1962. The episode was directed by Jonathan Alwyn and written by Leonard Fincham.

== Plot ==
Steed and Cathy get a job as bait in South America, investigating the murder of a British courier in Jamaica.

== Cast ==
- Patrick Macnee as John Steed
- Honor Blackman as Cathy Gale
- Richard Warner as Miguel Rosas
- David Cargill as Monroe
- Valerie Sarruf as Anna Rosas
- Douglas Muir as One Ten
- Gerald Harper as Travers
- Hedger Wallace as Alan Baxter
- Michael Forrest as Rico
- Maria Andipa as Singer, Conchita
- Alan Mason as Pasco
- Geoff L'Cise as Thug
- Arthur Griffiths as Thug
- Bernice Rassin as Chambermaid
- Jerry Jardin as Customer
