= Intercrime =

- The Avengers episode
- Episode no.: Season 2 Episode 15
- Directed by: Jonathan Alwyn
- Written by: Terrance Dicks; Malcolm Hulke
- Production code: 3515
- Original air date: 5 January 1963

Guest appearances
- Kenneth J. Warren; Julia Arnall; Angela Browne; Patrick Holt; Alan Browning; Jerome Willis

Episode chronology
← Previous "Dead on Course"	Next → "Immortal Clay"

"Intercrime" is the fifteenth episode of the second series of the 1960s cult British spy-fi television series The Avengers, starring Patrick Macnee and Honor Blackman. It was first broadcast by ABC on 6 January 1963. The episode was directed by Jonathan Alwyn and written by Terrance Dicks and Malcolm Hulke.

== Plot ==
Cathy Gale takes on the identity of an assassin to infiltrate a criminal gang. However things get complicated when the real assassin escapes from prison.

== Production notes ==
This episode was the first to be credited to John Bryce as producer. Later he re-worked it as "The Great, Great Britain Crime" for the sixth series. However after Bryce was replaced it was re-edited and released as "Homicide and Old Lace".

A brief continuity lapse causes a camera to be visible through a door in the last scenes of this episode.

== Cast ==
- Patrick Macnee as John Steed
- Honor Blackman as Cathy Gale
- Kenneth J. Warren as William Felder
- Julia Arnall as Hilda Stern
- Angela Browne as Pamela Johnson
- Patrick Holt as Jack Manning
- Alan Browning as Moss
- Jerome Willis as Lobb
- Paul Hansard as Hans Kressler
- Donald Webster as Palmer
- Rory MacDermot as Sewell
- Bettine Milne as Prison Officer Sharpe
- Charlotte Selwyn as Trustie
- Jean Gregory as Trustie
