= Death of a Great Dane =

- The Avengers episode
- Episode no.: Season 2 Episode 8
- Directed by: Peter Hammond
- Written by: Roger Marshall; Jeremy Scott
- Production code: 3511
- Original air date: 17 November 1962

Guest appearances
- Frederick Jaeger; Leslie French; John Laurie; Clare Kelly; Dennis Edwards; Anthony Baird

Episode chronology
| ← Previous "The Mauritius Penny" | Next → "The Sell Out" |

"Death of a Great Dane" is the eighth episode of the second series of the 1960s cult British spy-fi television series The Avengers, starring Patrick Macnee and Honor Blackman. It was first broadcast by ABC on 17 November 1962. The episode was directed by Peter Hammond and written by Roger Marshall and Jeremy Scott.

== Plot ==
When a road accident victim is found to have £50,000 worth of diamonds in his stomach, Steed and Cathy are called in to investigate.

== Cast ==
- Patrick Macnee as John Steed
- Honor Blackman as Cathy Gale
- Frederick Jaeger as Getz
- Leslie French as Gregory
- John Laurie as Sir James Mann
- Clare Kelly as Mrs. Miller
- Dennis Edwards as First Assistant
- Anthony Baird as Second Assistant
- Billy Milton as Minister
- Eric Elliott as Winetaster
- Roger Maxwell as Winetaster
- Herbert Nelson as Gravedigger
- Mike Moyer as Policeman
- Frank Peters as George Miller
- Kevin Barry as Kennels Man
