= Esprit de Corps (The Avengers) =

- The Avengers episode
- Episode no.: Season 3 Episode 25
- Directed by: Don Leaver
- Written by: Eric Paice
- Production code: 3624
- Original air date: 14 March 1964

Guest appearances
- Duncan Macrae; Joyce Heron; Roy Kinnear; John Thaw; Pearl Catlin

Episode chronology
← Previous "Concerto"	Next → "Lobster Quadrille"

"Esprit de Corps" is the twenty-fifth episode of the third series of the 1960s cult British spy-fi television series The Avengers, starring Patrick Macnee and Honor Blackman. It was first broadcast by ABC on 14 March 1964. The episode was directed by Don Leaver and written by Eric Paice.

== Plot ==
Steed and Cathy investigate the murder of a soldier, uncovering a plot to stage a coup d'état against the British government. The regal Mrs. Gale encounters a strangler who is not a true gentleman.

== Cast ==
- Patrick Macnee as John Steed
- Honor Blackman as Cathy Gale
- Duncan Macrae as Brigadier General Sir Ian Stuart-Bollinger
- Joyce Heron as Lady Dorothy Stuart-Bollinger
- Roy Kinnear as Private Jessop
- John Thaw as Captain Trench
- Pearl Catlin as Mrs. Angela Craig
- Doug Robinson as Sergeant Marsh
- Hugh Morton as Admiral, Harry
- Anthony Blackshaw as Private Hamish Asquith
- James Falkland as Signaller
- George Alexander as Piper
- George Macrae as Highland Dancer
- Tony Lambden as Drummer
