= Man with Two Shadows =

- The Avengers episode
- Episode no.: Season 3 Episode 3
- Directed by: Don Leaver
- Written by: James Mitchell
- Production code: 3605
- Original air date: 12 October 1963

Guest appearances
- Daniel Moynihan; Paul Whitsun-Jones; Philip Anthony; Gwendolyn Watts; Geoffrey Palmer

Episode chronology
← Previous "The Undertakers"	Next → "The Nutshell"

"Man with Two Shadows" is the third episode of the third series of the 1960s cult British spy-fi television series The Avengers, starring Patrick Macnee and Honor Blackman. It was first broadcast by ABC on 12 October 1963. The episode was directed by Don Leaver and written by James Mitchell.

== Plot ==
An agent who has been given multiple personalities reveals a plot to assassinate key government scientists and officials and replace them with doppelgangers. Cathy has to identify the real Steed and eliminate his imposter.

== Cast ==
- Patrick Macnee as John Steed
- Honor Blackman as Cathy Gale
- Daniel Moynihan as Bill Gordon
- Paul Whitsun-Jones as Charles
- Philip Anthony as Cummings
- Gwendolyn Watts as Julie
- Geoffrey Palmer as Dr. Terence
- Anne Godfrey as Miss Quist
- George Little as Sigi
- Doug Robinson as Rudi Engel
- Terence Lodge as Peter Borowski
- Robert Lankesheer as Holiday Camp Official
