= Warlock (The Avengers) =

- The Avengers episode
- Episode no.: Season 2 Episode 18
- Directed by: Peter Hammond
- Written by: Doreen Montgomery
- Production code: 3504
- Original air date: 25 January 1963

Guest appearances
- Peter Arne; John Hollis; Pat Spencer; Douglas Muir

Episode chronology
← Previous "Box of Tricks"	Next → "The Golden Eggs"

"Warlock" is the eighteenth episode of the second series of the 1960s cult British spy-fi television series The Avengers, starring Patrick Macnee and Honor Blackman. It was first broadcast in the Teledu Cymru region of the ITV network on Friday 25 January 1963. ABC Weekend TV, who produced the show for ITV, broadcast it the next day in its own regions. The episode was directed by Peter Hammond and written by Doreen Montgomery.

== Plot ==
The inventor of a new type of fuel lapses into a coma. Steed discovers that the scientist had links to black magic and the occult.

== Production ==
The episode was originally intended to introduce the Cathy Gale character. But after initial production in July 1962, the episode was revamped with various scenes reshot.

== Cast ==
- Patrick Macnee as John Steed
- Honor Blackman as Cathy Gale
- Peter Arne as Dr. Cosmo Gallion
- John Hollis as Markel
- Pat Spencer as Julia
- Douglas Muir as One Ten
- Olive Milbourne as Mrs. Dunning
- Alban Blakelock as Peter Neville
- Brian Vaughan as Doctor
- Gordon Gardner as Pathologist
- Philip Mosca as Mogom
- Susan Franklin as Barmaid Myrtle
- Herbert Nelson as Pasco
- Christina Ferdinando as Miss Timson
