= Immortal Clay =

- The Avengers episode
- Episode no.: Season 2 Episode 16
- Directed by: Richmond Harding
- Written by: James Mitchell
- Production code: 3516
- Original air date: 11 January 1963

Guest appearances
- Paul Eddington; James Bree; Bert Palmer; Gary Watson; Steve Plytas

Episode chronology
← Previous "Intercrime"	Next → "Box of Tricks"

"Immortal Clay" is the sixteenth episode of the second series of the 1960s cult British spy-fi television series The Avengers, starring Patrick Macnee and Honor Blackman. It was first broadcast in the Teledu Cymru region of the ITV network on Friday 11 January 1963. ABC Weekend TV, who produced the show for ITV, broadcast it the next day in its own regions. The episode was directed by Richmond Harding and written by James Mitchell.

== Plot ==
A company invents an unbreakable ceramic, the secret of which others try to steal. Following the death of an industrial spy in a vat of liquid clay, Steed and Cathy mount an undercover investigation.

== Cast ==
- Patrick Macnee as John Steed
- Honor Blackman as Cathy Gale
- Paul Eddington as Richard Marling
- James Bree as Miller
- Bert Palmer as Josh Machen
- Gary Watson as Allen Marling
- Steve Plytas as De Groot
- Rowena Gregory as Anne
- Didi Sullivan as Mara Little
- Douglas Muir as One Ten
- Frank Olegario as Blomberg
