= The Removal Men =

- The Avengers episode
- Episode no.: Season 2 Episode 6
- Directed by: Don Leaver
- Written by: Roger Marshall; Jeremy Scott
- Production code: 3509
- Original air date: 3 November 1962

Guest appearances
- Edwin Richfield; Reed De Rouen; Patricia Denys; George Roderick; Douglas Muir; Hira Talfrey

Episode chronology
← Previous "Mission to Montreal"	Next → "The Mauritius Penny"

"The Removal Men" is the sixth episode of the second series of the 1960s cult British spy-fi television series The Avengers, starring Patrick Macnee and Julie Stevens. It was first broadcast by ABC on 3 November 1962. The episode was directed by Don Leaver and written by Roger Marshall and Jeremy Scott.

== Plot ==
Steed goes undercover to infiltrate a clique of assassins based in France.

== Music ==
Julie Stevens sings "An Occasional Man" by Ralph Blane and Hugh Martin, accompanied by the Dave Lee Trio. The trio also perform a tune Lee stated he "made up in the studio" for the episode.

== Cast ==
- Patrick Macnee as John Steed
- Julie Stevens as Venus Smith
- Edwin Richfield as Bug Siegel
- Reed De Rouen as Jack Dragna
- Patricia Denys as Cecile Dragna
- George Roderick as Charlie Binaggio
- Douglas Muir as One Ten
- Hira Talfrey as Charlie Bonnay
- Edina Ronay as Nicole Cauvin
- Donald Tandy as Godard
- Ivor Dean as Harbour Officer
- Hugo De Vernier as Jailer
- George Little as Waiter
