= Propellant 23 (The Avengers) =

- The Avengers episode
- Screen title
- Episode no.: Season 2 Episode 2
- Directed by: Jonathan Alwyn
- Written by: Jon Manchip White
- Production code: 3505
- Original air date: 6 October 1962

Guest appearances
- Justine Lord; Katherine Woodville; Geoffrey Palmer; Ralph Nossek; Barry Wilsher; John Crocker

Episode chronology
← Previous "Mr Teddy Bear"	Next → "The Decapod"

"Propellant 23" is the second episode of the second series of the 1960s cult British spy-fi television series The Avengers, starring Patrick Macnee and Honor Blackman. It was first broadcast by ABC on 6 October 1962. The episode was directed by Jonathan Alwyn and written by Jon Manchip White.

== Plot ==
Steed and Cathy must retrieve a flask of top secret rocket fuel stolen from a murdered courier at a French airport.

== Cast ==
- Patrick Macnee as John Steed
- Honor Blackman as Cathy Gale
- Justine Lord as Jeanette
- Katherine Woodville as Laure
- Geoffrey Palmer as Paul Manning
- Ralph Nossek as Roland
- Barry Wilsher as Pierre
- John Crocker as Lt. 'Curly' Leclerc
- Trader Faulkner as Jacques Tissot
- John Dearth as Siebel
- Frederick Schiller as Jules Meyer
- Nicholas Courtney as Captain Legros
- Michael Beint as Co-Pilot, Robert
- John Gill as Baker, Jean Martan
- Graham Ashley as Gendarme
- Deanne Shendey as Shop Assistant
