= Brief for Murder =

- The Avengers episode
- Episode no.: Season 3 Episode 1
- Directed by: Peter Hammond
- Written by: Brian Clemens
- Production code: 3600
- Original air date: 28 September 1963

Guest appearances
- John Laurie; Harold Scott; Helen Lindsay; Alec Ross; June Thody; Anthony Baird

Episode chronology
← Previous "Killer Whale"	Next → "The Undertakers"

"Brief for Murder" is the first episode of the third series of the 1960s cult British spy-fi television series The Avengers, starring Patrick Macnee and Honor Blackman. It was first broadcast by ABC on 28 September 1963. The episode was directed by Peter Hammond and written by Brian Clemens.

== Plot ==
Steed and Cathy set a trap to catch two corrupt lawyers.

== Cast ==
- Patrick Macnee as John Steed
- Honor Blackman as Cathy Gale
- John Laurie as Jasper Lakin
- Harold Scott as Miles Lakin
- Helen Lindsay as Barbara Kingston
- Alec Ross as Ronald Henry Wescott
- June Thody as Dicey Hunt
- Anthony Baird as Wilson
- Alice Fraser as Miss Elizabeth Prinn
- Fred Ferris as Inspector Marsh
- Michael Goldie as Bart
