= Richmond Harding =

- Born: Richmond Norman Harding; 28 September 1923; Isleworth, London, England
- Died: 21 October 2010 (aged 87); Salisbury, Wiltshire, England
- Occupations: Television director and producer

Richmond Harding (28 September 1923 – 21 October 2010) was an English television director, producer, second unit director, and assistant director. He was the son of a chartered surveyor. Harding fought in Burma during the war with the Indian Mountain Artillery. He directed seven episodes of the British television series The Avengers in 1962 and 1963, and was credited with the idea of clothing Honor Blackman in black leather as Catherine Gale in the series. Later in the 1960s, he directed several episodes of the TV series Z-Cars, Coronation Street, Emergency – Ward 10 and others.

He also contributed to films Scott of the Antarctic, Passport to Pimlico, Whisky Galore!, The Great Game and Appointment in London.

== Credits ==
Production	Notes	Functioned as
Scott of the Antarctic	Film (1948)	Third assistant director (uncredited)
Passport to Pimlico	Film (1949)	Third assistant director (uncredited)
Whisky Galore!	Film (1949)	Third assistant director (uncredited)
The Great Game	Film (1953)	Assistant director
Appointment in London	Film (1949)	First assistant director: second unit (uncredited)
Cards with Uncle Tom	TV Movie (1959)	Producer
The World of Tim Frazer	6 episodes (1961)	Producer; Director
The Avengers	7 episodes (1962–63): "Mr. Teddy Bear" (1962); "The Mauritius Penny" (1962); "Traitor in Zebra" (1962); "Dead on Course" (1962); "Immortal Clay" (1963); "The White Dwarf" (1963); "Six Hands Across a Table" (1963)	Director
Out of This World	"Medicine Show" (1962)	Director
Jezebel ex UK	"The Long Cool Drop" (1963)	Director
Detective	1 episode (1964)	Director
Z-Cars	"First Class Citizen" (1964); "Happy Birthday" (1964)	Director
Swizzlewick	6 episodes (1964)	Director
Coronation Street	2 episodes (1965)	Director
The Flying Swan	3 episodes (1965)	Director
Emergency – Ward 10	"A Matter of Will" (1967)	Director
