= Mission to Montreal =

- The Avengers episode
- Episode no.: Season 2 Episode 5
- Directed by: Don Leaver
- Written by: Lester Powell
- Production code: 3500
- Original air date: 27 October 1962

Guest appearances
- Jon Rollason; Patricia English; Iris Russell; Mark Eden; Gillian Muir; Harold Berens; Alan Curtis; John Bennett; Gerald Sim

Episode chronology
← Previous "Bullseye"	Next → "The Removal Men"

"Mission to Montreal" is the fifth episode of the second series of the 1960s cult British spy-fi television series The Avengers, starring Patrick Macnee. It was first broadcast by ABC on 27 October 1962. The episode was directed by Don Leaver and written by Lester Powell.

== Plot ==
Steed and Dr. King are assigned a mission to recover a microfilm containing the stolen plans of a missile early warning system. Shipboard, they meet knives and a drunken film star.

== Cast ==
- Patrick Macnee as John Steed
- Jon Rollason as Dr. Martin King
- Patricia English as Carla Berotti
- Iris Russell as Sheila Dowson
- Mark Eden as Alec Nicholson
- Gillian Muir as Judy
- Harold Berens as Film Director
- Alan Curtis as A.G. Brand
- John Bennett as Guido Marson
- Gerald Sim as Budge
- Eric McCain as Pearson
- Alan Casley as Barman
- John Frawley as Passenger
- Malcolm Taylor as Reporter
- Terence Woodfield as Reporter
- Leslie Pitt as Reporter
- Pamela Ann Davy as Peggy
- William Buck as Photographer
- Angela Thorne as Receptionist
- Peter Mackriel as Steward
- William Swan as Steward

== Story Notes ==
Mission to Montreal is introduces Dr. Martin King (Jon Rolloason), a thinly disguised reworked character of Dr. David Keel, marking the first of three appearances in the series. The other Keel episodes held over and rewritten for series 2 are The Sell-Out and Dead on Course.
