= The Big Thinker =

- The Avengers episode
- Episode no.: Season 2 Episode 12
- Directed by: Kim Mills
- Written by: Martin Woodhouse
- Production code: 3514
- Original air date: 15 December 1962

Guest appearances
- Antony Booth; Walter Hudd; David Garth; Tenniel Evans; Allan McClelland

Episode chronology
← Previous "Traitor in Zebra"	Next → "Death Dispatch"

"The Big Thinker" is the twelfth episode of the second series of the 1960s cult British spy-fi television series The Avengers, starring Patrick Macnee and Honor Blackman. It was first broadcast by ABC on 15 December 1962. The episode was directed by Kim Mills and written by Martin Woodhouse.

== Plot ==
A new cryogenic missile defence system computer, Plato, springs a deadly leak. Sabotage? Murder? Steed investigates while Cathy plays cards with sharks.

== Cast ==
- Patrick Macnee as John Steed
- Honor Blackman as Cathy Gale
- Antony Booth as Dr. James Kearns
- Walter Hudd as Dr. Clemens
- David Garth as Dr. Farrow
- Tenniel Evans as Dr. Hurst
- Allan McClelland as Nicky Broster
- Penelope Lee as Clarissa
- Marina Martin as Janet Lingfield
- Ray Browne as Blakelock
- Clive Baxter as Nino
