= Bullseye (The Avengers) =

- The Avengers episode
- Episode no.: Season 2 Episode 4
- Directed by: Peter Hammond
- Written by: Eric Paice
- Production code: 3508
- Original air date: 20 October 1962

Guest appearances
- Ronald Radd; Charles Carson; Judy Parfitt; Felix Deebank; Mitzi Rogers; Robin Wentworth

Episode chronology
← Previous "The Decapod"	Next → "Mission to Montreal"

"Bullseye" is the fourth episode of the second series of the 1960s cult British spy-fi television series The Avengers, starring Patrick Macnee and Honor Blackman. It was first broadcast by ABC on 20 October 1962. The episode was directed by Peter Hammond and written by Eric Paice.

== Plot ==
Steed and Cathy investigate illegal gunrunning to Africa by a British arms manufacturer.

== Cast ==
- Patrick Macnee as John Steed
- Honor Blackman as Cathy Gale
- Ronald Radd as Henry Cade
- Charles Carson as Brigadier Williamson
- Judy Parfitt as Miss Doreen Ellis
- Felix Deebank as Young
- Mitzi Rogers as Jean
- Robin Wentworth as George the Foreman
- Fred Ferris as Inspector
- Bernard Kay as Karl
- Laurie Leigh as Dorothy Young
- John Frawley as Reynolds
- Graeme Bruce as Shareholder
