= The White Dwarf =

- The Avengers episode
- Episode no.: Season 2 Episode 21
- Directed by: Richmond Harding
- Written by: Malcolm Hulke
- Production code: 3520
- Original air date: 15 February 1963

Guest appearances
- George A. Cooper; Philip Latham; Peter Copley; Bill Nagy; Daniel Thorndike; Constance Chapman; Keith Pyott

Episode chronology
← Previous "School for Traitors"	Next → "Man in the Mirror"

"The White Dwarf" is the twenty-first episode of the second series of the 1960s cult British spy-fi television series The Avengers, starring Patrick Macnee and Honor Blackman. It was first broadcast in the Teledu Cymru region of the ITV network on Friday 15 February 1963. ABC Weekend TV, who produced the show for ITV, broadcast it the next day in its own regions. The episode was directed by Richmond Harding and written by Malcolm Hulke.

== Plot ==
A leading astronomer predicts that the earth is about to be destroyed. Steed and Cathy investigate a conspiracy to silence him.

== Cast ==
- Patrick Macnee as John Steed
- Honor Blackman as Cathy Gale
- George A. Cooper as Maxwell Barker
- Philip Latham as Professor Cartwright
- Peter Copley as Henry Barker
- Bill Nagy as Mervin Johnson
- Daniel Thorndike as Sir Charles
- Constance Chapman as Miss Edwina Tregarth
- Keith Pyott as Professor Richter
- Paul Anil as Professor Rahim
- John Falconer as Butler
- Vivienne Drummond as Dr Elizabeth Fuller
- George Roubicek as Dr Luke Richter
