= The Decapod =

- The Avengers episode
- Episode no.: Season 2 Episode 3
- Directed by: Don Leaver
- Written by: Eric Paice
- Production code: 3507
- Original air date: 13 October 1962

Guest appearances
- Paul Stassino; Philip Madoc; Wolfe Morris; Lynn Furlong; Raymond Adamson; Harvey Ashby

Episode chronology
← Previous "Propellant 23"	Next → "Bullseye"

"The Decapod" is the third episode of the second series of the 1960s cult British spy-fi television series The Avengers, starring Patrick Macnee and Julie Stevens. It was first broadcast by ABC on 13 October 1962. This was the first episode to feature the recurring character Venus Smith. The episode was directed by Don Leaver and written by Eric Paice.

== Plot ==
When the personal secretary of the President of the Republic of the Balkans is murdered at the embassy by a masked assassin, Steed is brought in to protect him, although the Balkan President declines the protection, pointing out that he has two bodyguards, both champion wrestlers, with him at all times. Steed embeds a night-club singer, Venus Smith, into his entourage by telling her that the President would be able to arrange a singing engagement in the Balkans. Meanwhile, the bodyguards are dying, apparently from the same masked assassin, a professional wrestler named "The Decapod".

== Music ==
Julie Stevens sings "You're Getting To Be A Habit With Me" composed by Harry Warren and "I Got It Bad (and That Ain't Good)" by Duke Ellington, accompanied by the Dave Lee Trio.

== Cast ==
- Patrick Macnee as John Steed
- Julie Stevens as Venus Smith
- Paul Stassino as Yakob Borb
- Philip Madoc as Stepan
- Wolfe Morris as Ito
- Lynn Furlong as Edna Ramsden
- Raymond Adamson as Harry Ramsden
- Harvey Ashby as Guard's Officer
- Pamela Conway as Girl In Shower
- Stanley M. Ayers as Ring Announcer
- Doug Robinson as Bodyguard Georgi
- Valentino Musetti as Bodyguard Sarkoff
- Valerie Stanton as Cigarette Girl
