= The Nutshell (The Avengers) =

- The Avengers episode
- Screen title
- Episode no.: Season 3 Episode 4
- Directed by: Raymond Menmuir
- Written by: Philip Chambers
- Production code: 3602
- Original air date: 19 October 1963

Guest appearances
- Bud Tingwell; John Cater; Patricia Haines; Christine Shaw; Edina Ronay; Ian Clark

Episode chronology
← Previous "Man with Two Shadows"	Next → "Death of a Batman"

"The Nutshell" is the fourth episode of the third series of the 1960s cult British spy-fi television series The Avengers, starring Patrick Macnee and Honor Blackman. It was first broadcast by ABC on 19 October 1963. The episode was directed by Raymond Menmuir.

== Plot ==
Steed and Cathy investigate espionage by a pretty burglar in "The Nutshell", codename for a top-secret underground nuclear shelter. They are not telling each other everything, and somewhere a traitor lurks.

== Cast ==
- Patrick Macnee as John Steed
- Honor Blackman as Cathy Gale
- Bud Tingwell as Mick Venner
- John Cater as Disco
- Patricia Haines as Laura
- Christine Shaw as Susan Campbell
- Edina Ronay as Elin Strindberg
- Ian Clark as Anderson
- Ray Browne as Alex
- Jan Conrad as Jason Avon
- Edwin Brown as Military Policeman, Bill
