= School for Traitors =

- The Avengers episode
- Episode no.: Season 2 Episode 20
- Directed by: Jonathan Alwyn
- Written by: James Mitchell
- Production code: 3519
- Original air date: 8 February 1963

Guest appearances
- Melissa Stribling; Anthony Nicholls; John Standing; Richard Thorp; Reginald Marsh

Episode chronology
← Previous "The Golden Eggs"	Next → "The White Dwarf"

"School for Traitors" is the twentieth episode of the second series of the 1960s cult British spy-fi television series The Avengers, starring Patrick Macnee and Julie Stevens. It was first broadcast in the Teledu Cymru region of the ITV network on Friday 8 February 1963. ABC Weekend TV, who produced the show for ITV, broadcast it the next day in its own regions. The episode was directed by Jonathan Alwyn and written by James Mitchell.

== Plot ==
During a spate of suicides at a university, a burglar seeks a non-existant note that one of the students had purportedly sent to Venus before his death. Steed uncovers a sinister plot to blackmail students into espionage activities.

== Music ==
Julie Stevens sings Put On a Happy Face with lyrics by Lee Adams and music by Charles Strouse from Bye Bye Birdie, and Yellow Bird by Alan and Marilyn Bergman

== Cast ==
- Patrick Macnee as John Steed
- Julie Stevens as Venus Smith
- Melissa Stribling as Claire Summers
- Anthony Nicholls as Dr. Shanklin
- John Standing as Ted East
- Richard Thorp as Jack Roberts
- Reginald Marsh as Higby
- Frank Shelley as Professor Aubyn
- Frederick Farley as One Seven
- Terence Woodfield as Green
- Ronald Mayer as Proctor
- Jan Butlin as Barmaid
