= Mr Teddy Bear =

- The Avengers episode
- Episode no.: Season 2 Episode 1
- Directed by: Richmond Harding
- Written by: Martin Woodhouse
- Production code: 3506
- Original air date: 29 September 1962

Guest appearances
- Douglas Muir; Bernard Goldman; Tim Brinton; Kenneth Keeling; John Horsley; John Ruddock; Michael Robbins

Episode chronology
← Previous "Dragonsfield"	Next → "Propellant 23"

"Mr Teddy Bear" is the first episode of the second series of the 1960s cult British spy-fi television series The Avengers, starring Patrick Macnee and Honor Blackman. It was first broadcast by ABC on 29 September 1962. The episode was directed by Richmond Harding and written by Martin Woodhouse.

== Plot ==
Steed and Cathy must track down an elusive assassin nicknamed Mr Teddy Bear.

== Cast ==
- Patrick Macnee as John Steed
- Honor Blackman as Cathy Gale
- Douglas Muir as One Ten
- Bernard Goldman as Mr Teddy Bear
- Tim Brinton as TV Interviewer
- Kenneth Keeling as Colonel Vernon Wayne-Gilley
- John Horsley as Dr. Gilmore
- John Ruddock as Dr. James Howell
- Michael Robbins as Henry Farrow
- Michael Collins as George, the Technician/Teddy Bruin
- Sarah Maxwell as Blonde Cafe Girl
