= Concerto (The Avengers) =

- The Avengers episode
- Episode no.: Season 3 Episode 24
- Directed by: Kim Mills
- Written by: Terrance Dicks; Malcolm Hulke
- Production code: 3601
- Original air date: 7 March 1964

Guest appearances
- Nigel Stock; Sandor Elès; Dorinda Stevens; Bernard Brown; Geoffrey Colville

Episode chronology
← Previous "The Charmers"	Next → "Esprit de Corps"

"Concerto" is the twenty-fourth episode of the third series of the 1960s cult British spy-fi television series The Avengers, starring Patrick Macnee and Honor Blackman. It was first broadcast by ABC on 7 March 1964. The episode was directed by Kim Mills and written by Terrance Dicks and Malcolm Hulke.

== Plot ==
Steed and Cathy come to the rescue of a visiting Russian concert pianist who has a dead girl in his room.

== Cast ==
- Patrick Macnee as John Steed
- Honor Blackman as Cathy Gale
- Nigel Stock as Zalenko
- Sandor Elès as Stefan Veliko
- Dorinda Stevens as Darleen Lomax
- Bernard Brown as Peterson
- Geoffrey Colville as Burns
