= Six Hands Across a Table =

- The Avengers episode
- Screen title
- Episode no.: Season 2 Episode 25
- Directed by: Richmond Harding
- Written by: Reed R. de Rouen
- Production code: 3524
- Original air date: 16 March 1963

Guest appearances
- Guy Doleman; Campbell Singer; Philip Madoc; Edward de Souza; John Wentworth

Episode chronology
← Previous "A Chorus of Frogs"	Next → "Killer Whale"

"Six Hands Across a Table" is the twenty-fifth episode of the second series of the 1960s cult British spy-fi television series The Avengers, starring Patrick Macnee and Honor Blackman. ABC first broadcast on 16 March 1963. The episode was directed by Richmond Harding and written by Reed R. de Rouen.

== Plot ==
Cathy becomes romantically involved with shipyard owner Oliver Waldner, blissfully unaware that he is masterminding a dastardly plan to gain control of most of Britain’s shipbuilding industry. After she nearly dies in an apparent accident, Steed sets out to prove that Waldner has murdered a business rival.

== Cast ==
- Patrick Macnee as John Steed
- Honor Blackman as Cathy Gale
- Guy Doleman as Oliver Waldner
- Campbell Singer as George Stanley
- Philip Madoc as Julian Seabrook
- Edward de Souza as Brian Collier
- John Wentworth as Sir Charles Reniston
- Sylvia Bidmead as Rosalind Waldner
- Frank Sieman as Bert Barnes
- Stephen Hancock as Draughtsman
- Freda Bamford as Lady Reniston
- Gillian Barclay as Miss Francis
- Ilona Rodgers as Receptionist
- Ian Cunningham as Butler, Thomas
