= Dead on Course =

- The Avengers episode
- Episode no.: Season 2 Episode 14
- Directed by: Richmond Harding
- Written by: Eric Paice
- Production code: 3501
- Original air date: 29 December 1962

Guest appearances
- Jon Rollason; John McLaren; Liam Gaffney; Donal Donnelly; Peggy Marshall; Elizabeth Murray

Episode chronology
← Previous "Death Dispatch"	Next → "Intercrime"

"Dead on Course" is the fourteenth episode of the second season of the 1960s British spy-fi television series The Avengers, starring Patrick Macnee. It was first broadcast by ABC on 29 December 1962. The episode was directed by Richmond Harding and written by Eric Paice.

== Plot ==
Canadian aircraft crash off course, near an Irish convent. But what happened to the crew?

== Cast ==
- Patrick Macnee as John Steed
- Jon Rollason as Dr. Martin King
- John McLaren as Freedman
- Liam Gaffney as Michael Joyce
- Donal Donnelly as Vincent O'Brien
- Peggy Marshall as Mother Superior
- Elisabeth Murray as Deidre O'Connor/Slade
- Janet Hargreaves as Sister Isobel
- Nigel Arkwright as Mr. Hughes
- Bruce Boa as Bob Austin Slade
- Margo Jenkins as Margot
- Trevor Reid as Pilot
- Edward Kelsey as Gerry
- Denis Cleary as Ambulance Man
- Wilfred Grove as Male Nun
