= November Five =

- The Avengers episode
- Episode no.: Season 3 Episode 6
- Directed by: Bill Bain
- Written by: Eric Paice
- Production code: 3611
- Original air date: 2 November 1963

Guest appearances
- Ruth Dunning; David Davies; Ric Hutton; David Langton; Iris Russell

Episode chronology
← Previous "Death of a Batman"	Next → "The Gilded Cage"

"November Five" is the sixth episode of the third series of the 1960s cult British spy-fi television series The Avengers, starring Patrick Macnee and Honor Blackman. It was first broadcast by ABC on 2 November 1963. The episode was directed by Bill Bain and written by Eric Paice.

== Plot ==
Newly elected Member of Parliament, Michael Dyter, fakes his own death only to reappear later in possession of a nuclear bomb which he threatens to detonate on 5 November, in London. Steed and Cathy go into politics, during a race against time to hunt him down.

== Cast ==
- Patrick Macnee as John Steed
- Honor Blackman as Cathy Gale
- Ruth Dunning as Mrs. Ellen Dove
- David Davies as Arthur Dove
- Ric Hutton as Mark St. John
- David Langton as Major Gavin Swinburne
- Iris Russell as Fiona
- Gary Hope as Michael Osborne Dyter
- Joe Robinson as Max
- Aimée Delamain as 1st Lady
- John Murray Scott as Returning Officer
- Frank Maher as Farmer
