= The Golden Eggs =

- The Avengers episode
- Episode no.: Season 2 Episode 19
- Directed by: Peter Hammond
- Written by: Martin Woodhouse
- Production code: 3518
- Original air date: 1 February 1963

Guest appearances
- Peter Arne; Pauline Delaney; Donald Eccles; Gordon Whiting; Robert Bernal

Episode chronology
← Previous "Warlock"	Next → "School for Traitors"

"The Golden Eggs" is the nineteenth episode of the second series of the 1960s cult British spy-fi television series The Avengers, starring Patrick Macnee and Honor Blackman, and made by ABC Weekend TV. It was first broadcast in the Teledu Cymru region of the ITV network on Friday 1 February 1963. ABC broadcast it the next day in its own regions. The episode was directed by Peter Hammond and written by Martin Woodhouse.

== Plot ==
A burglar steals two gold-plated eggs from a laboratory not knowing that they contain a deadly virus.

== Cast ==
- Patrick Macnee as John Steed
- Honor Blackman as Cathy Gale
- Peter Arne as Julius Redfern
- Pauline Delaney as Elizabeth Bayle
- Donald Eccles as Dr. Ashe
- Gordon Whiting as Leon DeLeon
- Robert Bernal as Hillier
- Irene Bradshaw as Diana DeLeon
- Louis Haslar as Campbell
- Charlie Bird as Hall
