= The Mauritius Penny =

- The Avengers episode
- Episode no.: Season 2 Episode 7
- Directed by: Richmond Harding
- Written by: Malcolm Hulke; Terrance Dicks
- Production code: 3510
- Original air date: 10 November 1962

Guest appearances
- Alfred Burke; David Langton; Richard Vernon; Sylva Langova; Edward Jewesbury; Harry Shacklock

Episode chronology
← Previous "The Removal Men"	Next → "Death of a Great Dane"

"The Mauritius Penny" is the seventh episode of the second series of the 1960s cult British spy-fi television series The Avengers, starring Patrick Macnee and Honor Blackman. It was first broadcast by ABC on 10 November 1962. The episode was directed by Richmond Harding and written by Malcolm Hulke and Terrance Dicks.

== Plot ==
A philatelist is murdered after discovering an extremely rare and valuable stamp on sale. Steed and Cathy investigate and encounter a naughty dentist.

== Cast ==
- Patrick Macnee as John Steed
- Honor Blackman as Cathy Gale
- Alfred Burke as Brown
- David Langton as Gerald Shelley
- Richard Vernon as Lord Matterley
- Sylva Langova as Sheila Gray
- Edward Jewesbury as Maitland
- Harry Shacklock as Percy Peckham
- Philip Guard as Peter Goodchild
- Alan Rolfe as Inspector Burke
- Grace Arnold as Elsie, Charlady
- Edward Higgins as P.C. Andrews
- Delia Corrie as Miss Power
- Raymond Hodge as Auction Porter
- Edwin Brown as Lorry Driver
- Anthony Blackshaw as Lorry Driver's Mate
- Theodore Wilhelm as Foreign Delegate
- Anthony Rogers as Boy
