= The Charmers (The Avengers) =

- The Avengers episode
- Episode no.: Season 3 Episode 23
- Directed by: Bill Bain
- Written by: Brian Clemens
- Production code: 3623
- Original air date: 29 February 1964

Guest appearances
- Fenella Fielding; Warren Mitchell; Brian Oulton; Vivian Pickles; John Barcroft

Episode chronology
← Previous "The Outside-In Man"	Next → "Concerto"

"The Charmers" is the twenty-third episode of the third series of the 1960s cult British spy-fi television series The Avengers, starring Patrick Macnee and Honor Blackman. It was first broadcast by ABC on 29 February 1964. The episode was directed by Bill Bain and written by Brian Clemens.

== Plot ==
After a number of Soviet agents are murdered by an unknown third party, Steed and Cathy co-operate with their Russian counterparts to find the assassins.

== Cast ==
- Patrick Macnee as John Steed
- Honor Blackman as Cathy Gale
- Fenella Fielding as Kim Lawrence
- Warren Mitchell as Keller
- Brian Oulton as Mr. Edgar
- Vivian Pickles as Betty Smythe
- John Barcroft as Martin
- Malcolm Russell as Horace J. Cleeves
- Frank Mills as Harrap
- John Greenwood as Sam
- Peter Porteous as George Vinkel
