= Traitor in Zebra =

- The Avengers episode
- Episode no.: Season 2 Episode 11
- Directed by: Richmond Harding
- Written by: John Gilbert
- Production code: 3513
- Original air date: 8 December 1962

Guest appearances
- John Sharp; Richard Leech; Noel Coleman; Jack Stewart; Ian Shand; William Gaunt

Episode chronology
← Previous "Death on the Rocks"	Next → "The Big Thinker"

"Traitor in Zebra" is the eleventh episode of the second series of the 1960s cult British spy-fi television series The Avengers, starring Patrick Macnee and Honor Blackman. It was first broadcast by ABC on 8 December 1962. The episode was directed by Richmond Harding and written by John Gilbert.

== Plot ==
In Wales, a new satellite tracking system is being jammed every time it is used. Steed and Cathy search for the traitor who is passing on information about the project.

== Cast ==
- Patrick Macnee as John Steed
- Honor Blackman as Cathy Gale
- John Sharp as Rankin
- Richard Leech as Franks
- Noel Coleman as Captain Nash
- Jack Stewart as Thorne
- Ian Shand as Lieutenant Mellors
- William Gaunt as Sub-Lieutenant Graham
- June Murphy as Maggie
- Katy Wild as Linda
- Michael Danvers-Walker as Crane
- Richard Pescud as Escorting Officer
- Michael Browning as Wardroom Steward
