= Death of a Batman =

- The Avengers episode
- Episode no.: Season 3 Episode 5
- Directed by: Kim Mills
- Written by: Roger Marshall
- Production code: 3609
- Original air date: 26 October 1963

Guest appearances
- André Morell; Philip Madoc; Katy Greenwood; David Burke; Geoffrey Alexander

Episode chronology
← Previous "The Nutshell"	Next → "November Five"

"Death of a Batman" is the fifth episode of the third series of the 1960s cult British spy-fi television series The Avengers, starring Patrick Macnee and Honor Blackman. It was first broadcast by ABC on 26 October 1963. The episode was directed by Kim Mills and written by Roger Marshall.

== Plot ==
Steed attends his wartime batman's funeral and discovers that the deceased has unexpectedly left a very substantial sum of money. Kathy's photography leads to violence and electronics. The answer to the mystery involves illegal insider trading.

== Cast ==
- Patrick Macnee as John Steed
- Honor Blackman as Cathy Gale
- André Morell as Lord Basil Teale
- Philip Madoc as Eric Van Doren
- Katy Greenwood as Lady Cynthia Bellamy
- David Burke as John Wrightson
- Geoffrey Alexander as Victor Gibbs
- Kitty Atwood as Edith Wrightson
- Ray Browne as Cooper
