= Killer Whale (disambiguation) =

The orca, or killer whale, is a toothed whale and the largest member of the oceanic dolphin family.

Killer Whale may also refer to:

- The Whale God, alternatively known as Killer Whale, a 1962 Japanese tokusatsu (kaiju) film
- Killer Whale (2026 film), a survival thriller film
- "Killer Whale" (The Avengers), an episode of the TV series The Avengers
