= The Undertakers (The Avengers) =

- The Avengers episode
- Episode no.: Season 3 Episode 2
- Directed by: Bill Bain
- Written by: Malcolm Hulke
- Production code: 3608
- Original air date: 5 October 1963

Guest appearances
- Lee Patterson; Jan Holden; Lally Bowers; Patrick Holt; Mandy Miller; Howard Goorney

Episode chronology
← Previous "Brief for Murder"	Next → "Man with Two Shadows"

"The Undertakers" is the second episode of the third series of the 1960s cult British spy-fi television series The Avengers, starring Patrick Macnee and Honor Blackman. It was first broadcast by ABC on 5 October 1963. The episode was directed by Bill Bain and written by Malcolm Hulke.

== Plot ==
Why are they coming for people who aren't dead yet? A dodgy retirement home is being used as part of a scam to avoid inheritance tax. Steed and Cathy investigate.

== Cast ==
- Patrick Macnee as John Steed
- Honor Blackman as Cathy Gale
- Lee Patterson as Lomax
- Jan Holden as Paula Madden
- Lally Bowers as Mrs. Renter
- Patrick Holt as Robert Madden
- Mandy Miller as Daphne Madden
- Howard Goorney as Green
- Marcella Markham as Mrs. Lomax
- Ronald Russell as Wilkinson
- Helena McCarthy as Mrs. Baker
- Denis Forsyth as Reeve
