= Box of Tricks (The Avengers) =

- The Avengers episode
- Episode no.: Season 2 Episode 17
- Directed by: Kim Mills
- Written by: Peter Ling; Edward Rhodes
- Production code: 3517
- Original air date: 18 January 1963

Guest appearances
- Jane Barratt; Maurice Hedley; Edgar Wreford; Ian Curry; April Olrich

Episode chronology
| ← Previous "Immortal Clay" | Next → "Warlock" |

"Box of Tricks" is the seventeenth episode of the second series of the 1960s cult British spy-fi television series The Avengers, starring Patrick Macnee and Julie Stevens. It was first broadcast in the Teledu Cymru region of the ITV network on Friday 18 January 1963. ABC Weekend TV, who produced the show for ITV, broadcast it the next day in its own regions. The episode was directed by Kim Mills and written by Peter Ling and Edward Rhodes.

== Plot ==
Steed is given to job of finding out who is stealing secrets. The death of a nightclub magician's assistant leads through a crippled general and a quack doctor, to employment opportunities and secret documents. Steed enlists the help of Venus to root out the criminals by becoming the new assistant.

== Music ==
Julie Stevens sings It's A Pity To Say Goodnight by Ella Fitzgerald and It's De-Lovely by Cole Porter, during which - in a rarity for the entire series - she briefly breaks the fourth wall.

== Cast ==
- Patrick Macnee as John Steed
- Julie Stevens as Venus Smith
- Jane Barratt as Kathleen Sutherland
- Maurice Hedley as General Sutherland
- Edgar Wreford as Dr. Gallam
- Ian Curry as Gerry Weston
- April Olrich as Denise
- Dallas Cavell as Manager
- Jacqueline Jones as Henriette
- Robert Hartley as Nena the Barman
- Royston Tickner as Maitre D'
- Gail Starforth as Maid
- Lynn Taylor as Valerie
