= Spy-fi =

Spy-fi may refer to:

- Spy fiction, a genre of fiction involving espionage as an important context or plot device
- Spy-fi (subgenre), a subgenre of spy fiction that includes elements of science fiction
