= Propellant 23 =

Propellant 23 may refer to:

- Fluoroform
- Propellant 23 (The Avengers)
