= The Sell Out (The Avengers) =

- The Avengers episode
- Episode no.: Season 2 Episode 9
- Directed by: Don Leaver
- Written by: Brandon Brady; Anthony Terpiloff
- Production code: 3502
- Original air date: 24 November 1962

Guest appearances
- Jon Rollason; Frank Gatliff; Carleton Hobbs; Arthur Hewlett; Gillian Muir; Anne Godley; Michael Mellinger

Episode chronology
← Previous "Death of a Great Dane"	Next → "Death on the Rocks"

"The Sell Out" is the ninth episode of the second series of the 1960s cult British spy-fi television series The Avengers, starring Patrick Macnee. It was first broadcast by ABC on 24 November 1962. The episode was directed by Don Leaver and written by Brandon Brady and Anthony Terpiloff.

== Plot ==
Steed, though under suspicion himself, leads an operation to flush out a traitor plotting to assassinate a foreign dignitary. Dr. King initially refuses to be involved, but comes to Steed's aid.

== Cast ==
- Patrick Macnee as John Steed
- Jon Rollason as Dr. Martin King
- Frank Gatliff as Mark Harvey
- Carleton Hobbs as Monsieur Roland
- Arthur Hewlett as One Twelve
- Gillian Muir as Judy
- Anne Godley as Lillian Harvey
- Michael Mellinger as Fraser
- Richard Klee as Workman
- Storm Durr as Gunman
- Cyril Renison as Customer
- Anthony Blackshaw as Policeman
- Ray Browne as Price
