= Lobster Quadrille =

- The Avengers episode
- Episode no.: Season 3 Episode 26
- Directed by: Kim Mills
- Written by: Richard Lucas
- Production code: 3625
- Original air date: 21 March 1964

Guest appearances
- Leslie Sands; Burt Kwouk; Gary Watson; Jennie Linden; Norman Scace; Corin Redgrave

Episode chronology
← Previous "Esprit de Corps"	Next → "The Town of No Return"

"Lobster Quadrille" is the twenty-sixth episode of the third series of the 1960s cult British spy-fi television series The Avengers, starring Patrick Macnee and Honor Blackman. It was first broadcast by ABC on 21 March 1964. The episode was directed by Kim Mills and written by Richard Lucas.

== Plot ==
Steed and Cathy investigate an illegal drug smuggling operation.

== Cast ==
- Patrick Macnee as John Steed
- Honor Blackman as Cathy Gale
- Leslie Sands as Captain Slim
- Burt Kwouk as Mason
- Gary Watson as Max Bush
- Jennie Linden as Katie Miles
- Norman Scace as Dr. Stannage
- Corin Redgrave as Quentin Slim
- Valentino Musetti as Jackson

== Episode notes ==
The episode title is a reference to "The Mock Turtle's Song", also known as the "Lobster Quadrille", a song and dance in Lewis Carroll's 1865 novel Alice's Adventures in Wonderland.

The episode is notable for a number of lasts:

- This is Honor Blackman's final appearance as Cathy Gale. Blackman's forthcoming appearance in the Bond film Goldfinger, is alluded when Cathy remarks to Steed she is going 'Pussyfooting'.
- This is the final episode in the original series run to be recorded on videotape. From series four and continuing into The New Avengers, The Avengers would be recorded on film.
- Lobster Quadrille would be the last time the original Avengers theme, composed by Johnny Dankworth would be used. Laurie Johnson composed a new theme tune for series four and onwards. Johnson would remain as primary composer for the sequel series, The New Avengers.
- The last episode to have John Bryce as producer, Richard Bates as story editor (who wrote this episode under the pseudonym 'Richard Lucas') and Kim Mills as director. John Bryce would return for series six, but left after three episodes. The episodes initially produced by Bryce (Invitation to a Killing, Invasion of the Earthmen and The Great Great Britain Crime) were re-edited and produced under the Fennel/Clemens banner.

== See also ==
- Lobster-quadrille
- Quadrille
- Quadrille paper
