= Killer Whale (The Avengers) =

- The Avengers episode
- Episode no.: Season 2 Episode 26
- Directed by: Kim Mills
- Written by: John Lucarotti
- Production code: 3525
- Original air date: 23 March 1963

Guest appearances
- Patrick Magee; John Bailey; Kenneth Farrington; Morris Perry; John Tate

Episode chronology
← Previous "Six Hands Across a Table"	Next → "Brief for Murder"

"Killer Whale" is the twenty-sixth episode of the second series of the 1960s cult British spy-fi television series The Avengers, starring Patrick Macnee and Honor Blackman. It originally aired on ABC on 23 March 1963. The episode was directed by Kim Mills and written by John Lucarotti.

== Plot ==
Steed investigates a possible link between the proprietors of a boxing ring and the illegal smuggling of ambergris.

== Cast ==
- Patrick Macnee as John Steed
- Honor Blackman as Cathy Gale
- Patrick Magee as Sam 'Pancho' Driver
- John Bailey as Fernand
- Kenneth Farrington as Joey Frazer
- Morris Perry as Harry
- John Tate as Willie
- Julie Paulle as Angela
- Christopher Coll as Laboratory assistant
- Robert Mill as Brown
- Fredric Abbott as Sailor
- Lyndall Goodman as Receptionist
- Brian Mason as Tiger
