= The Undertakers =

The Undertakers could refer to:

- The Undertakers (band)
- The Undertakers (The Avengers)
- "The Undertakers", short story from The Second Jungle Book
