= The Sell Out =

The Sell Out may refer to:

- The Sell Out (film)
- The Sell Out (The Avengers)
