= Robert Lankesheer =

British actor (1914–1993)

Robert Lankesheer (1914–1993) was a British stage, radio and television actor, best known for playing the character Leamington Sparr in the radio soap The Dales between 1963 and 1966 and Chamberlain in the television series Doctor Who in 1965.

== Early life ==
He was born on 28 April 1914 in Southampton, England. Whilst working for the local government in the land registry department he took evening classes and qualified in law. He served in the army during World War II as an officer in the Royal Artillery. After the war he decided to take up acting professionally.

== Career ==
On stage, in addition to his repertory theatre work, Robert Lankesheer played Sir Henry Burke in Templeton at the Arts Theatre in 1958 and Mr Quelch between 1960 and 1963 in the Billy Bunter Christmas shows at the Victoria Palace Theatre and Queen's Theatre, London. He had a long association with The Royal Opera, Covent Garden, performing roles in Carmen (1973), A Midsummer Night's Dream (1974, 1976, 1984) and Die Zauberflöte (1979, 1980, 1983, 1985, 1986, 1987, 1989, 1991).

In films, Robert Lankesheer appeared in David Copperfield (1970) and Young Winston (1972).

His television credits include:

- The Malory Secret (1951)
- At Your Service Ltd (1951)
- The Trial of Andy Fothergill (1951)
- Emil and the Detectives (1952)
- Theatre Royal (1955)
- Tales from Dickens (1960)
- Starr and Company (1958)
- Dancers in Mourning (1959)
- An Arabian Night (1960)
- Deadline Midnight (1960)
- Dixon of Dock Green (1961, 1967)
- Emergency Ward 10 (1962)
- The Scales of Justice (1963)
- Out of This World (1962)
- The Avengers: Man with Two Shadows (1963)
- Doctor Who: The Crusade (1965)
- The Paradise Makers (1967)
- Z-Cars (1968, 1976)
- Dad's Army (1969)
- Rogues' Gallery: The Wicked Stage (1969)
- Junket 89 (1970)
- Bachelor Father (1970)
- Doctor in Charge (1972)
- An Evening with Francis Howerd (1975)
- Thriller (1975)
- The Professionals (1978)
- Fawlty Towers (1979)
- Reilly, Ace of Spies (1983)
- Full House (1985)
- Mixed Doubles (1985)

== Death ==
Robert Lankesheer died on 29 December 1993 in London, England of emphysema.
