= Jennie Linden =

English actress (born 1939)

- Born: 8 December 1939 (age 86); Worthing, Sussex, England
- Education: Royal Central School of Speech and Drama
- Occupation: Actress
- Years active: 1956–2005
- Known for: Dr. Who and the Daleks; Women in Love
- Spouse: Chris Mann (m. 1962)
- Children: 1

Jennie Linden (born 8 December 1939) is an English actress. She is best known for her starring role in Ken Russell's film Women in Love (1969) as well as her starring role in the cult film Nightmare (1964).

== Life and career ==
Linden was born in Worthing to Marcus and Freida Fletcher.

Her earliest film appearances were as the heroine in Hammer's Nightmare (1964) and Barbara in Dr. Who and the Daleks (1965). Her most widely known film role was as Ursula in Women in Love (1969), for which she received a BAFTA nomination; a year later she appeared in the film version of Iris Murdoch's novel A Severed Head. Her subsequent film appearances include Vampira (1974), Valentino (1977) and Charlie Muffin (1979).

Wishing to bring up her son in England, Linden decided not to pursue a career in Hollywood. She was considered for The Lion in Winter (1968) and The Go-Between (1970); the latter was for the lead role of Marian Maudsley for which Julie Christie was later cast. She turned down the role of Amy in Sam Peckinpah's Straw Dogs (1971).

She starred with Kenneth Williams in the theatrical production of My Fat Friend in 1972. Also, she toured in Trevor Nunn's Royal Shakespeare Company production of Hedda Gabler for two years playing Thea Elvsted, with Glenda Jackson in the title role; they later appeared together in the 1975 film adaptation.

Linden's television credits include The Avengers (episode: Lobster Quadrille, 1964); Dr. Finlay's Casebook (episode: A Right to Live, 1965); Sherlock Holmes (1965); The Saint (Episode S5, E4: "The Reluctant Revolution",1966) as Diane Holbrook; The Persuaders! (episode: To the Death, Baby, 1970); The Rivals (1970); The Adventures of Black Beauty (episode: "Foul Play", 1973); Thriller (episode: "Death to Sister Mary", 1974) as "Sister Mary"; Little Lord Fauntleroy (1976); Lillie (1978) as Patsy Cornwallis-West; Tales of the Unexpected (episode: "Pattern of Guilt", 1982); Lytton's Diary (1985); Chancer (1990); Lovejoy (1991); and Trainer (1991). She continues to perform different roles on TV and stage. She is married to Chris Mann; they have a son, Rupert.

== Filmography ==
Year	Title	Role	Notes
1964	Nightmare	Janet	
1965	Dr. Who and the Daleks	Barbara	
1969	Women in Love	Ursula Brangwen	
1970	A Severed Head	Georgie Hands	
1974	Pogled iz potkrovlija	Linda Channing	
1974	Vampira	Angela	
1975	Hedda	Thea Elvsted	
1977	Valentino	Agnes Ayres	
1979	Charlie Muffin	Edith	

== Television ==
Year	Title	Role	Notes
1962-3	Tales of Mystery	Margaret/Mary	2 episodes
1963	Emergency Ward 10	Judy Sinclair	2 episodes
1963-4	ITV Play of the Week	Daphne Stillington/Annie Hudd	2 episodes
1963-4	Drama 61-67	Eve/Betsy Bannerman	2 episodes
1964	Armchair Theatre	Betty	Episode: "The Pretty English Girls"
1964	The Avengers	Katie Miles	Episode: "Lobster Quadrille"
1964	Love Story	Janet Caldwell	Episode: "An Apple for the Teacher"
1964	Sergeant Cork	Julia Bell	Episode: "The Case of the Merry Widower"
1965	Sherlock Holmes	Violet de Merville	Episode: "The Illustrious Client"
1965	Public Eye	Sonia	Episode: "You Should Hear Me Eat Soup"
1965	Armchair Mystery Theatre	Claire Pace	Episode: "That Finishing Touch"
1965-6	The Saint	Diane Holbrook/Monya Stanford	2 episodes
1967	Mickey Dunne	Sue Kirby	Episode: "No Flowers by Request"
1967	The Revenue Men	Sheila Graham	Episode: "The Present"
1967-82	ITV Playhouse	Margery Battle/Lady Windermere	2 episodes
1968	Virgin of the Secret Service	Hon. Maud La Motte	Episode: "The Rajah and the Suffragette"
1968	The Champions	Samantha	Episode: "The Gilded Cage"
1970	BBC Play of the Month	Lydia Languish	Episode: "The Rivals"
1971	Jackanory	Storyteller	Story: "Princes and Princesses"
1971	Shadows of Fear	Judith	Episode: "Return of Favours"
1971	The Persuaders!	Shelley Masterton	Episode: "To the Death, Baby"
1972	His and Hers	Moira Ridley	Episode: "Moving"
1972	The Adventurer	Kay Masterton	Episode: "Deadlock"
1973	The Adventures of Black Beauty	Lady Faulkner	Episode: "Foul Play"
1973	ITV Saturday Night Theatre	Jan	Episode: "Visitors"
1974	Thriller	Sister Mary	Episode: "Death to Sister Mary"
1974	Orson Welles Great Mysteries	Alice Stubbs	Episode: "Trial for Murder"
1978	Lillie	Patsy Cornwallis-West	8 episodes
1979-80	Play for Today	Josie/Mrs. Edmonds	2 episodes
1980	Leap in the Dark	Anne	Episode: "Watching Me, Watching You"
1982	Dick Turpin	Mrs. Brownlow	Episode: "The Hanging"
1982	Tales of the Unexpected	Faye	Episode: "Pattern of Guilt"
1983	Partners in Crime	Cicely March	Episode: "The Ambassador's Boots"
1983	The Morecambe and Wise Show	Herself	Christmas Special
1985	The Corsican Brothers	Countess Wolski	TV movie
1985	Lytton's Diary	Solveig Lindstrom	Episode: "The Silly Season"
1986	The Practice	Gillian Golding	8 episodes
1989	The Endless Game	Matron	1 episode
1989	Home James!	Jane Glass	Episode: "Rent-a-Butler"
1991	Lovejoy	Roz Chatfield	Episode: "One Born Every Minute"
1991	Chancer	Olivia	7 episodes
1991	The Piglet Files	Abigail Drummond	Episode: "Trouble with Reception"
1992	Trainer	Angela Healy	1 episode
1995	Casualty	Caroline Martin	Episode: "End of the Road"
