= Incident at Midnight =

1963 British film by Norman Harrison

- Directed by: Norman Harrison
- Written by: Arthur La Bern
- Based on: a short story by Edgar Wallace
- Produced by: Jack Greenwood
- Starring: Anton Diffring; William Sylvester; Justine Lord; Martin Miller
- Cinematography: James Wilson
- Edited by: Derek Holding
- Music by: Bernard Ebbinghouse
- Production company: Merton Park Studios
- Distributed by: Anglo-Amalgamated Film Distributors
- Release date: 1963
- Running time: 56 minutes
- Country: United Kingdom
- Language: English

Incident at Midnight is a 1963 British crime film directed by Norman Harrison and starring Anton Diffring, William Sylvester and Justine Lord. It was written by Arthur La Bern, adapted from an Edgar Wallace short story, and was made at Merton Park Studios as part of the series of Edgar Wallace Mysteries.

== Plot ==
Old Dr. Schroeder, who has been struck off, attends a late-night chemist every night for a prescription, and to observe Dr. Leichner, an ex-Nazi war criminal who has taken a new identity. Leichner has a blonde wife, and a blonde mistress, who is blackmailing him. He is also involved in a drug scam involving two lockers and two keys, and aims to become a millionaire selling drugs. Meanwhile, a wounded bank robber has been taken to the dispensary for treatment, and to rendezvous with his gang leader. Dr. Schroeder finds himself attending to the robber's injuries.

== Cast ==
- Anton Diffring as Dr. Erik Leichner
- William Sylvester as Vince Warren
- Justine Lord as Diane Graydon
- Martin Miller as Dr. Schroeder
- Tony Garnett as Brennan
- Philip Locke as Foster
- Sylva Langova as Vivienne Leichner
- Warren Mitchell as chemist
- Jacqueline Jones as Vanessa Palmer
- Peter Howell as Inspector Macready
- Oliver MacGreevy as Wilkinson
- David Futcher as Whitehead
- Clifford Earl as sergeant
- Geoffrey Palmer as Dr. Tanfield
- Derek Partridge as detective
- Fred Beauman as policeman
- Mike Moyer as policeman
- Roland Curram as soldier

== Critical reception ==
The Monthly Film Bulletin wrote: "An all-night chemist is at least a novel setting for a crime drama. Often vague, despite the final clarification, it is quite adequately played. Despite the billing, William Sylvester has only a small, inconsequential role."

Sky Movies wrote that the "harsh black-and-white photography effectively catches the bleak, claustrophobic atmosphere of the all-night chemist's in which some of the drama is set."

Leonard Maltin rated it two stars, calling it a "trim yarn."
