= Terrance Dicks =

English author and screenwriter (1935–2019)

- Dicks in 2013
- Born: Terrance William Dicks; 14 April 1935; East Ham, Essex, England
- Died: 29 August 2019 (aged 84); London, England
- Education: Downing College, Cambridge
- Occupations: Television screenwriter; Script editor; Producer; Children's author
- Years active: 1962–2019
- Known for: Doctor Who TV scripts, novelisations and novels
- Spouse: Elsa Germaney (m. 1963)
- Children: 3

Terrance William Dicks (14 April 1935 – 29 August 2019) was an English author and television screenwriter, script editor and producer. In television, he had a long association with the BBC science-fiction series Doctor Who, working as a writer and also serving as the programme's script editor from 1968 to 1974. The Doctor Who News Page described him as "arguably the most prolific contributor to Doctor Who". He later became a script editor and producer of classic serials for the BBC.

Dicks wrote many children's books during the 1970s and 1980s. He also maintained his association with Doctor Who by adapting televised stories into novelisations for Target Books and in later years contributing to many documentaries and DVD commentaries for the series.

== Early career ==
Born in East Ham, Essex (now part of Greater London), Dicks was the only son of William, a tailor's salesman and Nellie (née Ambler), a waitress. His parents later ran a pub, the Fox and Hounds, in Forest Gate. He excelled in English at East Ham Grammar School and consumed literature ranging from classics to pulp thrillers and adventure stories. He won a scholarship to study English at Downing College, Cambridge, and later performed two years of national service in the British Army with the Royal Fusiliers. Following his discharge from the armed forces, he worked for five years as an advertising copywriter, and started to write radio play scripts for the BBC in his spare time.

His breakthrough into television came when friend Malcolm Hulke, whom he met when he rented a room from him, asked for his help with the scripting of "The Mauritius Penny", an episode of the second series of ABC's action-adventure The Avengers, for which Dicks was awarded a co-writer's credit. Dicks went on to co-write a further two Avengers episodes with Hulke: the second, "Intercrime", was later re-worked for the sixth and final series.

== Doctor Who ==
In 1968, Dicks was hired as assistant script editor on the BBC science-fiction TV series Doctor Who. He was appointed head script editor the following year and earned his first writing credit for the programme when he and Hulke co-wrote the 10-part serial The War Games, which concluded the series' sixth season and the Second Doctor's (Patrick Troughton) tenure. The serial introduced the concept of the Time Lords and initiated the Doctor's exile to Earth, which would be a major theme of the Third Doctor's tenure. Dicks had been the uncredited co-writer of the earlier serial The Seeds of Death (1969), having extensively re-written Brian Hayles' original scripts.

Dicks formed a highly productive working relationship with incoming Doctor Who producer Barry Letts, serving as script editor on all of Letts's five seasons as series producer from 1970 to 1974. During his tenure as script editor on Doctor Who, Dicks oversaw a number of additions to the series' mythology that still exist in the modern era, including the following:

- The development of the Time Lords and their society
- The name Gallifrey (augmented from Doctor Who writer Robert Holmes' "Galfrey")
- The creation of companions Liz Shaw, Jo Grant, and Sarah Jane Smith
- The term "regeneration" (Planet of the Spiders)
- An established race of villainous monsters turn to the side of good (the Ice Warriors in The Curse of Peladon by Brian Hayles)
- Sontarans (from writer Robert Holmes)
- The Dematerialisation Circuit is vital for the operation of the TARDIS
- The concept that the TARDIS is indestructible
- The TARDIS can be remote controlled
- The TARDIS has a Telepathic Circuit (in The Time Monster)
- The TARDIS might be sentient (The Time Monster and Planet of the Spiders)
- The Blinovitch Limitation Effect used as a plot device to explain away paradoxes (Day of the Daleks)
- Multi-Doctor stories (The Three Doctors)

During Dicks' tenure, the series also delved into social and political concepts. Sometimes these were straightforward and other times they were metaphors. Concepts and topics included the respect for all life (The Silurians), Great Britain joining the European Economic Community (in metaphor in The Curse of Peladon), apartheid (The Mutants), global pollution (The Green Death) and equality for women (with the inclusion of Sarah Jane Smith as companion).

In 1972, Dicks embarked on a parallel career as an author with the publication of his first book, The Making of Doctor Who (a history of the production of the TV series), which was co-written by Hulke.

After stepping down as script editor, Dicks continued his association with Doctor Who, writing four scripts for his successor, Robert Holmes: these were Robot (1975, Tom Baker's first outing as the Fourth Doctor), The Brain of Morbius (1976, for which Dicks was credited under the pseudonym Robin Bland after his displeasure at Holmes' re-writes prompted him to request that it be shown "under some bland pseudonym"), Horror of Fang Rock (1977) and State of Decay (1980), a re-written version of a story originally titled The Vampire Mutations, which had been due for production during season 15. The BBC decided that the vampiric theme would clash with the plot of its new adaptation of Bram Stoker's Count Dracula, which was due for transmission at roughly the same time, and replaced it with Horror of Fang Rock. His final Doctor Who script was "The Five Doctors" (1983), a feature-length episode for the programme's 20th anniversary.

Dicks' other work for Doctor Who included two stage plays, Doctor Who and the Daleks in the Seven Keys to Doomsday (1974) and Doctor Who - The Ultimate Adventure (1989), and an audio drama for Big Finish Productions titled Comeback (2002), which was the first to feature former Doctor's companion Sarah Jane Smith in a significant capacity. He went on to contribute several additional scripts to Big Finish including audio adaptations of his two-stage plays, a Sixth Doctor-era story for the "Companion Chronicle" range, and a Bernice Summerfield story, in 2011, which was the final script of his career.

The first serial aired after Dicks' death, the 2020 Thirteenth Doctor-era story "Spyfall", was dedicated to him.

=== Books ===
Dicks contributed heavily to Target Books' series of novelisations of the Doctor Who TV serials, writing 67 of the titles published by the company. As Dicks explains in an interview in the documentary Built for War (included on the 2006 DVD release of The Sontaran Experiment), he served as the unofficial editor of the Target Books range. In this role, he would attempt to enlist the author of the original scripts to write the novelisation whenever possible, but if they refused or had other commitments, Dicks would usually undertake the work himself (although he also recruited other writers, including former Doctor Who actor Ian Marter and former series producer Philip Hinchcliffe).

On one occasion, he enlisted Robert Holmes to novelise his script for The Time Warrior, but when Holmes gave up after writing only one chapter, it was left to Dicks to complete the work. Dicks had better success in recruiting the original writers for the later Doctor Who serials, and was required to adapt only one Sixth Doctor story himself (The Mysterious Planet; he again replaced Holmes, who had died in 1986). Dicks' name appears on the cover of no Seventh Doctor novelisations. His plans to publish a novelisation of his stage play Doctor Who - The Ultimate Adventure were not realised.

As of September, 1980, Terrance Dicks' Doctor Who novelisations had sold three-and-a-half million copies and had been translated into ten different languages.

During the 1990s, Dicks contributed to Virgin Publishing's line of full-length, officially licensed, original Doctor Who novels, New Adventures, which continued the series' storyline following the TV cancellation in 1989. Dicks wrote three Doctor Who novels for Virgin, and continued to write occasionally for the franchise after BBC Books assumed the licence in 1997. He wrote the first of the Eighth Doctor Adventures, titled The Eight Doctors, which was, for a time, the best-selling original Doctor Who novel. World Game, featuring the Second Doctor, is set during "Season 6B". Later contributions to the range were the Quick Reads books Made of Steel and Revenge of the Judoon, both featuring the Tenth Doctor and Martha Jones.

His final Doctor Who short story, "Save Yourself", was published posthumously by BBC Books in October 2019.

A compilation of his work chosen by fans, The Essential Terrance Dicks, was published in two volumes in August 2021.

== Other television work ==
Dicks also wrote for the ATV soap opera Crossroads. He co-created and wrote for the short-lived BBC science-fiction TV series Moonbase 3 (1973), and wrote for the ITC science-fiction series Space: 1999 (1976). During the early 1980s, Dicks served once more as script editor to producer Barry Letts on the BBC's Sunday Classics strand of period dramas and literary adaptations.

When Letts returned to directing in 1985, Dicks succeeded him as the producer of the Sunday Classics, overseeing productions such as Oliver Twist (1985), David Copperfield (1986) and Vanity Fair (1987), before retiring from the BBC in 1988 to resume his career as a novelist.

== Children's fiction and non-fiction ==
It was through his work on Doctor Who books that Dicks became a writer of children's fiction, penning many successful titles during the 1970s and 1980s. In 1976, he wrote a trilogy for Target Books, The Mounties, concerning a Royal Canadian Mounted Police recruit. They were followed from 1979 to 1983 another trilogy, Star Quest, which was later re-printed by Big Finish Productions.

Beginning in 1978, Dicks penned The Baker Street Irregulars inspired by the Sherlock Holmes characters; the series eventually ran to 10 books, the last published in 1987. In 1981, he commenced work on a series of six children's horror novels with Cry Vampire. In 1987, Dicks started a new series for very young children titled T. R. Bear, resulting in a further seven books. There followed the Sally Ann series, about a ragdoll, Magnificent Max, about a cat, and The Adventures of Goliath (Dicks' longest series, at 18 books), about a Golden Retriever. Another five books concerning a St. Bernard dog make up the Harvey series.

Jonathan's Ghost and its three sequels were published in 1988, and the three-part MacMagic series followed in 1990. The Littlest Dinosaur was published in 1993 and The Littlest on Guard in 1994. Other works that Dicks published in 1994 include Woof! The Never Ending Tale, the Cold Blood series and the Chronicles of a Computer Game Addict series (both in four parts). Between 1998 and 2000, Dicks penned Changing Universe trilogy. In 2000 and 2001, Dicks produced the 12-book series, The Unexplained.

As well as his numerous fictional works, Dicks also penned several non-fiction books for children, including Europe United, A Riot of Writers, Uproar in the House, A Right Royal History and The Good, the Bad and the Ghastly.

== Personal life ==
Dicks lived in Hampstead, London. In 1963, he married Elsa Germaney, a teacher and later a Quaker recording clerk. They had three sons: Stephen, Jonathan and Oliver. They also had three grandchildren: Amy, Nelly Rose, and Rufus.

Dicks died in London on 29 August 2019 after a short illness.

In 2025, the Terrance Dicks archive was acquired by the Borthwick Institute for Archives, part of the University of York.

== Bibliography ==
- Great March West (1976)
- Massacre in the Hills (1976)
- War Drums of the Blackfoot (1976)
- The Case of the Missing Masterpiece (1978)
- Spacejack (1978)
- The Case of the Blackmail Boys (1979)
- Roboworld (1979)
- The Case of the Cinema Swindle (1980)
- The Case of the Crooked Kids (1980)
- The Case of the Ghost Grabbers (1980)
- Cry Vampire! (1981)
- The Case of the Cop Catchers (1981)
- Terrorsaur! (1981)
- Ask Oliver (1982)
- Marvin's Monster (1982)
- Wereboy! (1982)
- The Mystery of the Missing Diamond (1983)
- Demon of the Dark (1983)
- The Fireworks Mystery (1984)
- The Mystery of the Missing Train (1984)
- Goliath and the Dognappers (1984)
- Ghosts of Gallows Cross (1984)
- Gupta's Christmas (1985)
- Goliath on Holiday (1985)
- Goliath at the Dog Show (1986)
- Goliath's Christmas (1986)
- T.R. Afloat (1986)
- T.R.'s Hallowe'en (1986)
- In the Money (1986)
- The Disappearing Diplomat (1986)
- The Case of the Fagin File (1987)
- Goliath and the Burglar (1987)
- Goliath and the Buried Treasure (1987)
- Goliath Goes to Summer School (1987)
- Goliath on Vacation (1987)
- Goliath's Easter Parade (1987)
- Goliath at the Seaside (1988)
- T.R's Big Game (1987)
- T.R.'s Festival (1987)
- Sally Ann, on Her Own (1987)
- By the Sea (1987)
- School Fair (1987)
- The Criminal Computer (1988)
- The Haunted Holiday (1988)
- Goliath Cub Scouts (1989)
- Enter T.R. (1988)
- T.R. Bear: Enter T.R., T.R. Goes to School, T.R.'s Day Out, T.R.'s Halloween (1988)
- T.R. Goes Skiing (1988)
- T.R. Goes to Hollywood (1988)
- T.R. Goes to School (1988)
- T.R.'s Day Out (1988)
- The Picnic (1988)
- Sally Ann Goes to Hospital (1988)
- Sally Ann's School Play (1988)
- In Trouble (1988)
- A New Beginning (1988)
- Goliath's Sports Day (1989)
- T.R. Down Under (1989)
- T.R. in New York (1989)
- At the Ballet (1989)
- The River Rats (1989)
- The School Spirit (1989)
- Spitfire Summer (1989)
- Magnificent Max (1989)
- Goliath and the Cub Scouts (1990)
- Goliath's Birthday (1990)
- Teacher's Pet (1990)
- T.R. Bear at the Zoo (1990)
- The Pony (1990)
- Majestic Max (1990)
- Max and the Quiz Kids (1990)
- Meet the MacMagics (1990)
- My Brother the Vampire (1990)
- Lost Property (1990)
- Prisoners of War (1990)
- The Winjin' Pom (1991)
- The Big Match (1991)
- Goliath Gets a Job (1991)
- Jonathan and the Superstar (1991)
- Jonathan's Ghost (1991)
- Max's Amazing Summer (1991)
- A Spell for My Sister (1991)
- George and the Dragon (1991)
- What's Going On William (1991)
- The Comic Capers (1992)
- Sally Ann and the School Show (1992)
- Max and the Cat Burglar (1992)
- Max and the Missing Megastar (1992)
- Steaming Sam (1992)
- Knightschool (1992)
- War of the Witches (1992)
- On Their Own (1993)
- Goliath and the School Bully (1993)
- Sally Ann and the Mystery Picnic (1993)
- Max's Old-fashioned Christmas (1993)
- The Littlest Dinosaur (1993)
- Nurse Sally Ann (1994)
- The Ultimate Game (1994)
- Killing Time: Cold Blood 2 (1994)
- Littlest on Guard (1994)
- Cyberspace Adventure (1994)
- Woof! the Never Ending Tale (1994)
- Terror in the Swamp (1994)
- World War Two (1995)
- Harvey to the Rescue (1995)
- Escape from Everytown (1995)
- Littlest Disappears (1995)
- Virtual Unreality (1995)
- The Wild West (1996)
- World War One (1996)
- Harvey and the Beast of Bodmin (1996)
- Harvey on Holiday (1996)
- The Wollagong Incident (1996)
- Murder on the Net (1996)
- Jonathan's Ghost: Spitfire Summer, The School Spirit and Jonathan and the Superstar: A Spine-chilling Trilogy (1997)
- Harvey and the Swindlers (1997)
- Harvey Goes to School (1997)
- The Bermuda Triangle Incident (1997)
- The Circle of Death Incident (1997)
- Stella's Wedding (1990)
- Internet Danger (1998)
- The Transylvanian Incident (1998)
- SS World (1998)
- Mets O Hyd (1998)
- The Borley Rectory Incident (1998)
- The Easter Island Incident (1999)
- Mafia Incident (1999)
- The Pyramid Incident (1999)
- Eco Crash (1999)
- Sam the Detective (1999)
- The Chinese Ghost Incident (2000)
- The Mars Project (2000)
- Cassie and the Devil's Charm (2000)
- Sci-Fi Danger: Set of 6 (2000)
- Endgame (2000)
- The Bombay Deaths Incident (2001)
- The Inca Alien Incident (2001)
- The Nazi Dagger Incident (2001)
- Cassie and the Conway Curse: Second Sight II (2001)
- Cassie and the Cornish Ghost: Second Sight III (2001)
- Cassie and the Riviera Crime (2002)
- Nikki and the Drugs Queen Murder (2002)
- Star Quest (2003)

=== Doctor Who ===
==== Novelisations ====
Most of Dicks' Doctor Who novelisations incorporated the prefix "Doctor Who and..." before the title, as did most of the series' novelisations prior to 1981. Several of his novels were subsequently re-printed in omnibus editions, such as The Adventures of Doctor Who and The Dalek Omnibus. In the late 1980s, Star Books issued "2-in-1" collections of selected Target Books novelisations, which included several of Dicks' works.

- The Auton Invasion (1974)
- The Day of the Daleks (1974)
- The Abominable Snowmen (1974)
- The Giant Robot (1975; re-titled Robot for the 1992 edition; Dicks also wrote a version for younger readers, Junior Doctor Who and the Giant Robot, which was published in 1980)
- Terror of the Autons (1975)
- The Planet of the Spiders (1975)
- The Three Doctors (1975)
- The Loch Ness Monster (1976; re-titled Terror of the Zygons for the 1993 edition)
- The Revenge of the Cybermen (1976)
- The Genesis of the Daleks (1976)
- The Web of Fear (1976)
- The Planet of the Daleks (1976)
- The Pyramids of Mars (1976)
- The Carnival of Monsters (1977)
- The Dalek Invasion of Earth (1977)
- The Claws of Axos (1977)
- The Brain of Morbius (1977; Dicks also wrote a version for younger readers, Junior Doctor Who and the Brain of Morbius, which was published in 1980)
- The Planet of Evil (1977)
- The Mutants (1977)
- The Deadly Assassin (1977)
- The Talons of Weng-Chiang (1977)
- The Face of Evil (1978)
- The Horror of Fang Rock (1978)
- The Time Warrior (1978; with Robert Holmes, who is uncredited)
- Death to the Daleks (1978)
- The Android Invasion (1978)
- The Hand of Fear (1979)
- The Invisible Enemy (1979)
- The Robots of Death (1979)
- The Image of the Fendahl (1979)
- The Destiny of the Daleks (1979)
- Underworld (1980)
- The Invasion of Time (1980)
- The Stones of Blood (1980)
- The Androids of Tara (1980)
- The Power of Kroll (1980)
- The Armageddon Factor (1980)
- The Nightmare of Eden (1980)
- The Horns of Nimon (1980)
- The Monster of Peladon (1980)
- An Unearthly Child (1981)
- The State of Decay (1981)
- The Keeper of Traken (1982)
- The Sunmakers (1982)
- Meglos (1983)
- Four to Doomsday (1983)
- Arc of Infinity (1983)
- The Five Doctors (1983)
- Kinda (1983)
- Snakedance (1984)
- Warriors of the Deep (1984)
- Inferno (1984)
- The Caves of Androzani (1984)
- The Mind of Evil (1985)
- The Krotons (1985)
- The Time Monster (1985)
- The Seeds of Death (1986)
- The Faceless Ones (1986)
- The Ambassadors of Death (1987)
- The Trial of a Time Lord: The Mysterious Planet (1987)
- The Wheel in Space (1988)
- The Smugglers (1988)
- Planet of Giants (1990)
- The Space Pirates (1990)
- The Sarah Jane Adventures – Invasion of the Bane (2007)

==== Original novels ====
- Virgin New Adventures (the Doctor):
  - Timewyrm: Exodus (1991)
  - Blood Harvest (1994)
  - Shakedown (1995)
- Virgin New Adventures (Bernice Summerfield):
  - Mean Streets (1997)
- Eighth Doctor Adventures:
  - The Eight Doctors (1997)
  - Endgame (2000)
- Past Doctor Adventures:
  - Catastrophea (1998)
  - Players (1999)
  - Warmonger (2002)
  - Deadly Reunion (2003) (with Barry Letts)
  - World Game (2005)
- New Series Adventures (Quick Reads):
  - Made of Steel (2007)
  - Revenge of the Judoon (2008)

==== Original short story ====
- "Save Yourself" in Doctor Who: The Target Storybook (2019)

=== Non-fiction ===
- The Making of Doctor Who (1972; co-written with Malcolm Hulke; updated and re-issued in 1976)

=== Stage plays ===
- Doctor Who and the Daleks in Seven Keys to Doomsday (1974)
- Doctor Who – The Ultimate Adventure (1989)

=== Big Finish audio productions ===
- Sarah Jane Smith audio series
  - Comeback (2002)
- Big Finish stage play adaptations
  - Seven Keys to Doomsday (2008)
  - The Ultimate Adventure (2008)
- Companion Chronicles
  - Beyond the Ultimate Adventure (2010)
- Bernice Summerfield Short Stories
  - A Mutual Friend (2011)

== Writing credits ==
Production	Notes	Broadcaster
The Avengers	Writer, 5 episodes: "The Mauritius Penny" (co-written with Malcolm Hulke, 1962); "Intercrime" (co-written with Malcolm Hulke, 1963); "Concerto" (co-written with Malcolm Hulke, 1964); "The Great, Great Britain Crime" (co-written with Malcolm Hulke, 1967; unreleased; some filmed material subsequently re-worked into the below episode); "Homicide and Old Lace" (contains material co-written with Malcolm Hulke, 1969; uncredited additional framing material by Brian Clemens)	ITV
Crossroads	Writer, unknown episodes	ITV
Doctor Who	Writer, 35 episodes (1968–1983): The Dominators (1968) (episodes 4-5 of 5, uncredited); The Seeds of Death (1969) (episodes 3-6 of 6, uncredited); The War Games (10 episodes, co-written with Malcolm Hulke, 1969); Robot (4 episodes, 1974–1975); The Brain of Morbius (4 episodes, 1976, credited under an alias); Horror of Fang Rock (4 episodes, 1977); State of Decay (4 episodes, 1980); "The Five Doctors" (1 episode, 1983); Script Editor, 156 episodes (1968–1974): The Invasion (8 episodes, 1968); The Krotons (4 episodes, 1968–1969); The Seeds of Death (6 episodes, 1969); The War Games (10 episodes, 1969); Spearhead from Space (4 episodes, 1970); Doctor Who and the Silurians (7 episodes, 1970); The Ambassadors of Death (7 episodes, 1970); Inferno (7 episodes, 1970); Terror of the Autons (4 episodes, 1971); The Mind of Evil (6 episodes, 1971); The Claws of Axos (4 episodes, 1971); Colony in Space (6 episodes, 1971); The Dæmons (5 episodes, 1971); Day of the Daleks (4 episodes, 1972); The Curse of Peladon (4 episodes, 1972); The Sea Devils (6 episodes, 1972); The Mutants (6 episodes, 1972); The Time Monster (6 episodes, 1972); The Three Doctors (4 episodes, 1972–1973); Carnival of Monsters (4 episodes, 1973); Frontier in Space (6 episodes, 1973); Planet of the Daleks (6 episodes, 1973); The Green Death (6 episodes, 1973); The Time Warrior (4 episodes, 1973–1974); Invasion of the Dinosaurs (6 episodes, 1974); Death to the Daleks (4 episodes, 1974); The Monster of Peladon (6 episodes, 1974); Planet of the Spiders (6 episodes, 1974)	BBC1
Moonbase 3	Co-Creator and uncredited Script Editor, 6 episodes: "Departure and Arrival" (also co-writer, with Barry Letts, 1973); "Behemoth" (1973); "Achilles Heel" (1973); "Outsiders" (1973); "Castor and Pollux" (1973); "View of a Dead Planet" (1973)	BBC1
Space: 1999	Writer, 1 episode: "The Lambda Factor" (1976)	ITV
The Classic Serial	Script Editor, 134 episodes (1981-8): Great Expectations (12 episodes, 1981); Beau Geste (8 episodes, 1981–2; also co-writer with Alistair Bell); Stalky & Co. (6 episodes, 1982); The Hound of the Baskervilles (4 episodes, 1982); Dombey and Son (1 episode of 10, 1983); Jane Eyre (11 episodes, 1983); Goodbye, Mr. Chips (6 episodes, 1984); The Invisible Man (6 episodes, 1984); The Prisoner of Zenda (4 episodes, 1984); The Pickwick Papers (12 episodes, 1985); Oliver Twist (12 episodes, 1985; uncredited Script Editor, credited Producer); Alice in Wonderland (4 episodes, 1986; uncredited Script Editor, credited Producer); Brat Farrar (6 episodes, 1986; uncredited Script Editor, credited Producer); David Copperfield (10 episodes, 1986; uncredited Script Editor, credited Producer); The Diary of Anne Frank (4 episodes, 1987; uncredited Script Editor, credited Producer); Vanity Fair (16 episodes, 1987–8; uncredited Script Editor, credited Producer); The Franchise Affair (6 episodes, 1988; uncredited Script Editor, credited Producer)	BBC1
Doctor Who: Shakedown: Return of the Sontarans	Feature film (1994)	N/A
Doctor Who: Mindgame	Short film (1998)	N/A
Doctor Who: Mindgame Trilogy	Feature film (1999) (segment: "Battlefield")	N/A

== Awards and nominations ==
Year	Award	Work	Category	Result	Reference
1987	British Academy Television Awards	David Copperfield (shared with Barry Letts)	Best Children's Programme (Entertainment/Drama)	Nominated	
1988	CableACE Award	The Diary of Anne Frank	Children's Entertainment Special or Series - 9 and Older	Nominated	

Preceded by Derrick Sherwin	Doctor Who Script Editor; 1968–69	Succeeded by Derrick Sherwin

Preceded by Derrick Sherwin	Doctor Who Script Editor; 1969–1974	Succeeded by Robert Holmes
