= Robin Wentworth =

English television actor (1915–1997)

- Born: Victor Roy Wheeler; 20 July 1915; Edmonton, Middlesex England
- Died: 16 August 1997 (aged 82); Denville Hall, Northwood, London, England
- Citizenship: United Kingdom
- Occupation: Actor
- Years active: 1938–1992
- Spouse: Sheila Elizabeth Wharton (m. 1949; died 1988)

Robin Wentworth (20 July 1915 – 16 August 1997) was a British television actor, whose most prominent role was that of Ted Dawson in 116 episodes of soap-serial United!.

== Early life ==
A former Taunton schoolboy, he auditioned at Birmingham Repertory Theatre, only to be told by Sir Barry Jackson to "Go away immediately and get some experience then come back." Upon leaving the Army in 1945, Wentworth continued to write music but really earned his living by acting.

== Acting career ==
Another prominent role was playing Arthur Dewhurst, who was in a relationship with Elsie Tanner in 12 episodes of Coronation Street during 1961 before returning eight years later as John Greaves in two episodes. Wentworth's other work includes an episode of the Doctor Who Season 8 finale called The Dæmons, an episode of The Avengers called Bullseye and TV plays called Moonlight on the Highway and Robin Redbreast.
