= Nightmare (1964 film) =

British horror film by Freddie Francis

- British quad poster
- Directed by: Freddie Francis
- Written by: Jimmy Sangster
- Produced by: Jimmy Sangster
- Starring: David Knight; Moira Redmond; Brenda Bruce; Jennie Linden
- Cinematography: John Wilcox
- Edited by: James Needs
- Music by: Don Banks
- Production company: Hammer
- Distributed by: Rank Film Distributors
- Release dates: 19 April 1964 (London); 31 May 1964 (United Kingdom)
- Running time: 82 minutes
- Country: United Kingdom
- Language: English

Nightmare (also known as Here's the Knife, Dear: Now Use It) is a 1964 British neo-noir horror film directed by Freddie Francis and starring Jennie Linden. It was written by Jimmy Sangster, who also produced the film for Hammer Films. The film focuses on Janet, a young girl in a finishing school who is plagued by nightmares concerning her institutionalized mother.

== Plot ==
Janet Freeman, a girl at finishing school who six years earlier saw her mother stab her father to death, is plagued by nightmares. (Her mother, following the tragedy, was committed to an asylum.) Miss Mary Lewis, a teacher, takes Janet home and in the absence of Henry Baxter, Janet's guardian, they are met by John, the chauffeur; Mrs. Gibbs, the housekeeper; and Grace Maddox, an attractive nurse-companion hired by Henry. Miss Lewis leaves Janet in Grace's care.

The nightmares continue: a white-shrouded woman roams the corridors, inviting Janet to burst into her parents' room, where she finds the same woman on the bed with a knife in her chest. When Henry returns, he finds Janet under sedation; her doctors recommend psychiatric care but he refuses and Janet tries to commit suicide.

Henry's wife comes to tea and, because she seems to be the woman in Janet's nightmares, Janet stabs the woman to death and is promptly committed to an institution. The woman in white is revealed to be Grace, disguised with a wig and mask and conspiring with Henry. They marry, but Grace begins believing that Henry is trying to drive her mad. Under the impression that Janet has escaped from the asylum, Grace stabs Henry to death, expecting Janet to be blamed. However, Mrs. Lewis, Mrs. Gibbs and John reveal that they were on to Grace and Henry's plan to drive Janet crazy and decided to get revenge on the both of them and reveals that Janet is recovering well. Grace finally snaps before being brought to justice.

== Cast ==
- David Knight as Henry Baxter
- Moira Redmond as Grace Maddox
- Jennie Linden as Janet Freeman
  - Elizabeth Dear as Young Janet Freeman
- Brenda Bruce as Mary Lewis
- George A. Cooper as John
- Clytie Jessop as woman in white
- Irene Richmond as Mrs. Gibbs
- John Welsh as doctor
- Timothy Bateson as barman
- Isla Cameron as Mrs. Freeman

== Production ==
Jennie Linden was an 11th hour casting choice replacing Julie Christie who dropped out to do the film Billy Liar. The film was shot with the working title Here's the Knife Dear: Now Use It.

== Release ==
Nightmare had its public premiere at the New Victoria Theatre in London on 19 April 1964. It received a general release in the United Kingdom on 31 May 1964 by Rank Film Distributors in support of The Evil of Frankenstein.

In the United States, the film received a DVD release through Universal Pictures in an eight-film set titled "The Hammer Horror Series" on 6 September 2005. This set was re-released on Blu-ray on 13 September 2016.

The film was released on 28 November 2016 in the United Kingdom on a Region B Blu-ray disc.

On 28 June 2021 Nightmare was released in Europe as part of Powerhouse Films' "Hammer Volume Six: Night Shadows" limited edition Blu-ray box set.

== Reception ==
The Monthly Film Bulletin wrote: "Hammer Mark II, i.e the quasi-Diaboliques exercise as opposed to the Transylvanian blood-bath, has become as rigidly formalised as Perry Mason. While this makes things easier than ever for horror addicts, it has evidently proved an increasing burden of late for the writer, Jimmy Sangster, in his efforts to find even the slightest variations. Nightmare's equipage could hardly be more predictable: distraught heroine in ill-lit country house; phantoms gliding upstairs and down corridors; chauffeur, housekeeper, preoccupied and often-absent guardian, enigmatic mistress; knives, turning door-handles, masks, a perambulatory "corpse". Given the outlandish plot, director Freddie Francis makes quite a lot of one of Sangster's neater scripts. There is a sensible avoidance of awkward details ... as well as economy, more surprise than one expects, and several imaginative touches. ... Apart from David Knight, an even less impressive Hammer recruit than Oliver Reed, the players are very sound, Moira Redmond in particular having a field-day with the initially charming, ultimately crazed Grace Maddox."

AllMovie called the film an "effective little chiller that packs a surprising punch for a film of its age."
