= Kinky Boots (song) =

- Cover of the CD reissue (1990)

Single by Patrick Macnee and Honor Blackman
- Released: February 1964
- Genre: Beat
- Length: 1:37
- Label: Decca Records
- Songwriters: Herbert Kretzmer; David Lee

"Kinky Boots" is a song written by Herbert Kretzmer and David Lee for an episode of the television programme That Was The Week That Was in 1963, and subsequently recorded in 1964 by Patrick Macnee and Honor Blackman, stars of another television series, The Avengers.

== Background ==
The song was commissioned by Ned Sherrin for the satirical television series That Was the Week That Was and used in a sequence featuring the titular footwear, which were then fashionable, and performed by Millicent Martin on the show's November 2 1963 episode.

In February 1964, Decca released "Kinky Boots" as a single, performed by Patrick Macnee and Honor Blackman, with "Let's Keep It Friendly" on the B-side. Neither Macnee nor Blackman was able to sing, but the record was conceived as a piece of novelty merchandise to promote The Avengers television series, referring to the boots worn by Blackman's character in the series, Cathy Gale.

The song was not initially a hit, but it was re-released in 1990 amid a Swinging Sixties retro revival craze. "Kinky Boots" reached the top ten of the British Singles Chart in December of that year, after the song was promoted by BBC Radio One DJ Simon Mayo.

The single peaked at No.5 (on Deram records label KINKY 1) and remained on the chart for seven weeks. Prior to this, in 1977, it was placed at No.22 in the "Bottom 30" of Kenny Everett's World's Worst Wireless Show. The song is quite short: just one minute and thirty seven seconds long.

== Later critical reception ==
Upon the 1990 re-release, Jon Wilde from Melody Maker magazine considered it to be a "magnificent high camp curiosity", remarking on Patrick Macnee's delivery of lines such as "frumpy little beat girls" and "Leather is so kinky"."

Music writer George Gimarc found the song to be repetitive and annoying, and remarked on Macnee's "disturbing enthusiasm" in referring to "sexy little schoolgirls". Fashion writer Caroline Cox placed the song in the context of 1960s fetish fashion and sexual liberation, but cautiously noted that at the time, the term "kinky" meant "'not straight' or slightly naughty, rather than a full-on sexual perversion".

== Track listing ==
CD Single Reissue (1990)
No.	Title	Writer(s)	Length
1.	"Kinky Boots" (Patrick Macnee & Honor Blackman)	Lee/Kretzmer	1:40
2.	"Let's Keep It Friendly" (Patrick Macnee & Honor Blackman)	Lee/Kretzmer	2:23
3.	"I Wish I Never Loved You" (Honor Blackman)	Raymonde/Hawker	3:03
4.	"Men Will Deceive You" (Honor Blackman)	Stellman/Gainsbourg	2:28

== Charts ==
Chart (1990)	Peak position
Luxembourg (Radio Luxembourg)	2
UK Singles (OCC)	5
UK Airplay (Music Week)	40
