= Richard Warner (actor) =

English actor (1911–1989)

- 1939 Spotlight photo by Angus McBean
- Born: 24 May 1911; Congerstone, Leicestershire, England
- Died: 14 January 1989 (aged 77); Sevenoaks, Kent, England
- Occupation: Actor
- Years active: 1934–1988

Richard Warner (24 May 1911 – 14 January 1989) was an English actor. He appeared in more than one hundred films from 1938 to 1988. Also active on stage, his theatre work included Gerald Savory's George and Margaret on Broadway in 1937, and the original production of J.B. Priestley's When We Are Married in London's West End in 1938. He portrayed a judge in several episodes of Granada television's Crown Court from 1972 to 1973.

== Filmography ==
Film
Year	Title	Role	Notes
1949	Golden Arrow	Captain	
1951	To Have and to Hold	Cyril	
1953	The Story of Gilbert and Sullivan	Cellier	
1953	The Large Rope	Inspector Harmer	
1953	One Stop Shop	Dr. Blake	
1955	Contraband Spain	Inspector LeGrand	
1956	Othello	Roderigo	English version, Voice
1958	The Strange World of Planet X	Inspector Burns	
1958	The Moonraker	Trooper	
1959	The Dawn Killer	Mr. Hoddy	
1960	Village of the Damned	Harrington	
1961	The Shadow of the Cat	Edgar Venable	
1961	Never Back Losers	Mr. Crabtree	
1962	The Wild and the Willing	Coroner	
1962	The Share Out	Mark Speller	
1963	On the Run	Prison Governor	
1965	Mr. Brown Comes Down the Hill	Doctor	
1965	Give a Dog a Bone	Rat King	
1967	The Mummy's Shroud	Inspector Barrani	
1968	The Strange Affair	Magistrate	
1971	Mary, Queen of Scots	Francis Walsingham	
1972	Henry VIII and His Six Wives	William Warham	
1975	Inside Out	Wilhelm Schlager	
1976	Escape from the Dark		
1987	Maurice	Judge	
1988	Dream Demon	Minister	(final film role)

TV
Year	Title	Role	Notes
1959	Great Expectations	Orlick	6 episodes
1960	Danger Man	Hospital Director	Episode: "The Girl in Pink Pajamas"
1961–1962	Sir Francis Drake	Walsingham	4 episodes
1962	Man of the World	Inspector Sanglett	Episode: "A Family Affair"
1962	The Avengers	Miguel Rosas	Episode: "Death Dispatch"
1967	The Rat Catchers	Angelo Cornoldi	Episode: "Mission to Madeira"
1968–1970	Tom Grattan's War	Storyteller	26 episodes
1975	The Secret Garden	Dr Craven	4 episodes
1984	Strangers and Brothers	Doctor	Episode: #10
