= Justine Lord =

British actress

- Born: Jennifer Lily Schooling; 8 March 1937 (age 89); Bromley, Kent, England
- Occupation: Actress
- Spouse: James Ridler (m. 1971)

Justine Lord (born Jennifer Lily Schooling; 8 March 1937) is an English actress, active on television throughout the 1960s.

She began her acting career in repertory theatre. In the 1960s she made guest appearances in Live Now – Pay Later (1962), The Avengers ("Propellant 23", 1962), The Saint ("The Bunco Artists" and "The Saint Plays with Fire", 1963; "The Saint Steps In" and "The Imprudent Politician", 1964; "The Checkered Flag", 1965; "The Fiction-Makers", 1968), The Prisoner ("The Girl Who Was Death", 1968) and Man in a Suitcase, as well as playing regular roles in Crossroads, Compact, The Troubleshooters and The Doctors.

Lord married James Ridler in 1971. She retired from acting in the late 1970s, with the exception of an appearance in The Young Ones in 1982.

== Filmography ==
=== Film ===
Year	Title	Role	Notes
1962	Live Now – Pay Later	Coral Wentworth	
1962	The War Lover	Street Girl	
1963	Maniac	Grace	
1963	Tamahine	Diana	
1963	Edgar Wallace Mysteries (Incident at Midnight)	Diane Graydon	
1964	Ring of Spies	Christina	
1964	Act of Murder	Anne Longman	
1966	Doctor in Clover	New Matron	
1967	The Scales of Justice – "Payment in Kind"	Paula	Film series short
1967	Deadlier Than the Male	Peggy Ashenden	
1967	Mister Ten Per Cent	Lady Dorothea	
1968	The Fiction-Makers	Galaxy Rose	Film release of The Saint episodes "The Fiction-Makers" parts I and II
1969	Twenty Nine	Dee Baird	Short
1969	Night After Night After Night	Helena Lomax	

== Television ==
Year	Title	Role	Notes
1959	Charlesworth	Nursing Sister	
1961	A Life of Bliss	Belle	"2.2"
1961	ITV Television Playhouse	Janet / Veronica	"Hi Diddle Diddle", "Ben Spray"
1962	Compact	Kay Livingstone	Recurring role
1962	BBC Sunday-Night Play	Yvonne	"The Man Who Opted Out"
1962	The Avengers	Jeanette	"Propellant 23"
1962	ITV Play of the Week	Joan Ferris	"Murder in Shorthand"
1962	The Edgar Wallace Mystery Theatre	Diane Graydon	"Incident at Midnight"
1963	ITV Play of the Week	Claire Goode	"I Can't Bear Violence"
1963	Jane Eyre	Blanche Ingram	"1.2", "1.3"
1963	The Human Jungle	Susan Anthony	"14 Ghosts"
1963	Love Story	Angela Hawke	"Charlie Is My Darling"
1963	The Plane Makers	Phoebe	"The Old Boy Network"
1963	No Hiding Place	Barbara Green	"No Previous Convictions"
1963	The Saint	Lady Valerie Woodchester / Jean Yarmouth	"The Saint Plays with Fire", "The Bunco Artists"
1964	The Saint	Andrea Quennel / Denise Grant	"The Saint Steps In", "The Imprudent Politician"
1964	The Edgar Wallace Mystery Theatre	Anne Longman	"Act of Murder"
1964	Marriage Lines	Jill	"The Divorce"
1964	Gideon's Way	Rina	"The Lady-Killer"
1965	The Saint	Mandy Ellington	"The Checkered Flag"
1965	ITV Play of the Week	Sophie	"Finesse in Diamonds"
1965	Out of the Unknown	Paula	"Stranger in the Family"
1965	Hereward the Wake	Alftruda	TV series
1965–1968	The Troubleshooters	Steve Thornton	Regular role (seasons 1–2, 4)
1966	The Informer	Dotty Cland	"When You Shake Hands with a Greek"
1967	No Hiding Place	Sybil Miles	"New Faces for Old"
1967	Summer Playhouse	Margot Du Caine	"The Sleeping Partner"
1967	Summer Playhouse	Liz Barcher	"The Big Killing"
1968	The Prisoner	Sonia	"The Girl Who Was Death"
1968	Man in a Suitcase	Jane Farson	"Property of a Gentleman"
1968	Detective	Valmal Seacliff	"Artists in Crime"
1968	Journey to the Unknown	Sue Tarleton	"Girl of My Dreams"
1968	The Saint	Galaxy Rose	"The Fiction-Makers" parts I and II, also released as the film The Fiction Makers
1969	ITV Sunday Night Theatre	Lucy Lane	"The Dirt on Lucy Lane"
1969–1971	The Doctors	Dr. Liz McNeal	Main role
1970	Two in Clover	Hilary Berkeley	"2.5"
1971	The Fenn Street Gang	Mary Taylor	"These Foolish Things"
1973	The Generation Game	Perkins	broadcast Sat. 10th. Nov.,with Melvyn Hayes
1974	Miss Nightingale	Lady Lovelace	TV film
1976	Crossroads	Kelly	Regular role
1982	The Young Ones	The White Witch	"Flood"
