= Act of Murder (film) =

1964 British film by Alan Bridges

- Directed by: Alan Bridges
- Written by: Lewis Davidson
- Produced by: Jack Greenwood
- Starring: Anthony Bate; John Carson; Justine Lord
- Cinematography: James Wilson
- Edited by: Derek Holding
- Music by: Bernard Ebbinghouse
- Production company: Anglo-Amalgamated
- Release date: 1964
- Running time: 62 minutes
- Country: United Kingdom
- Language: English

Act of Murder is a 1964 British crime drama film, directed by Alan Bridges and starring Anthony Bate, John Carson and Justine Lord. It was written by Lewis Davidson. One of the Edgar Wallace Mysteries series, it was Bridges's first film as director.

== Plot ==
An actor, Tim Ford, tries to persuade an ex-actress, his former girlfriend Anne Longman, to return to the stage. Her husband, Ralph, suspects that Ford's motives are more than just professional. The Longmans plan to exchange their country house with the house of a London couple for a few days, but when they reach the London address they were given, there is no house there, and they return to their home, fearing it has been robbed of their valuable paintings and objets d'art. When they arrive, they find their belongings intact, but moved slightly from their usual places, and their dog and chickens have been killed. Frightened, Anne accepts Tim's offer of a temporary stage part, and goes to London to stay with her mother while in the role.

== Cast ==
- Anthony Bate as Ralph Longman
- John Carson as Tim Ford
- Justine Lord as Anne Longman
- Duncan Lewis as Will Peterson
- Dandy Nichols as Maud Peterson
- Richard Burrell as John Quick

== Critical reception ==
Film historians Steve Chibnall and Brian McFarlane wrote that on its release in the United Kingdom, the film "received pretty well uniformly positive reviews", especially for the directorial debut of Alan Bridges. They selected it as one of the 15 most meritorious British B films made between World War II and 1970, noting that "it picks its way through a web of obliquely suggested jealousy and a scam involving convincingly improbable frauds".

The reviewer "T.M." in the Monthly Film Bulletin declared the film an "uncommonly intelligent little thriller", but noted that it was "just the sort of film which is likely to arouse critical sneers for reaching too high on a low budget." The reviewer added, "Long, languid close-ups a la Antonioni convey the dreamy sensuousness of the wife, the introspective quality which makes her react so strongly to the bizarre situation; abrupt cuts within speeches, from character to character, suggest very precisely the tensions that underlie the relations between husband, wife and lover right from the start."
