= The Doctors (1969 TV series) =

British TV drama series (1969–1971)

- Genre: Drama
- Created by: Donald Bull
- Written by: Elaine Morgan; Fay Weldon
- Directed by: Michael E. Briant; Timothy Combe; Mary Ridge; Mike Bowen
- Starring: Justine Lord; Nigel Stock; Richard Leech; Pamela Duncan; John Barrie
- Opening theme: Tony Hatch
- Country of origin: United Kingdom
- Original language: English
- No. of series: 2
- No. of episodes: 160 (139 missing)

Production
- Producers: Colin Morris; Bill Sellars
- Running time: 30 minutes

Original release
- Network: BBC1
- Release: 19 November 1969 – 1971

The Doctors is a British television series, produced by the BBC between 1969 and 1971.

The series was set around a general practice in north London and leading cast members included: Justine Lord, Nigel Stock, Barry Justice, Richard Leech, Isla Blair and Lynda La Plante (billed as Lynda Marchal).

Nigel Stock's character, Dr. Thomas Owens, was the lead in a later spin-off series, Owen, M.D., which aired between 1971 and 1973.

Most of the episodes produced are missing from the archives; 139 of the 160 shows are thought to be lost.
