= John Wentworth (actor) =

British actor (1908–1989)

- in The Avengers ep: Six Hands Across a Table (1963)
- Born: Arthur Powell; June 7, 1908; Reading, Berkshire, England
- Died: June 28, 1989 (aged 81); England
- Occupation: Actor
- Years active: 1958 - 1984

John Wentworth (1908–1989) was a British television actor. He starred in the ITV television series The Main Chance in which he played the role of Henry Castleton a traditionalist Leeds-based lawyer.

== Selected filmography ==
Film

- The Last Shot You Hear (1969) - Chambers
- The Oblong Box (1969) - Parson

Television

- The Scales of Justice (1963) - Registrar
- The Massingham Affair (1964) - Colonel Deverel
- The Count of Monte Cristo (1964) - Abbe Feria
- Angel Pavement (1967) - Mr. Pearson
- The Prisoner (1967) - Sir Charles Portman
- The Main Chance (1969-1975) - Henry Castleton
- Germinal (1970) - Monsieur Gregoire
- The Last of the Mohicans (1971) - Tamenund
- Bel Ami (1971) – Comte de Vaudrec
- The Rivals of Sherlock Holmes (1971) - Thaxted
- The Onedin Line (1974-1980) - Dawkins / Mr. Dawkins / Mr. Wallace
- Ripping Yarns (1976) - Chaplain
- Number 10 (1983) - Sir Henry Campbell-Bannerman
