= Nicholas Alwyn =

English cricketer

Personal information
- Born: 13 June 1938
- Died: 15 June 2021 (aged 83)
- Batting: Right-handed

Domestic team information
- Years: Team
- 1961: Cambridge University

Career statistics
Competition	First-class
Matches	5
Runs scored	141
Batting average	14.10
100s/50s	0/0
Top score	41
Catches/stumpings	0/-
- Source: CricketArchive, 9 August 2008

Nicholas Alwyn (13 June 1938 – 16 June 2021) was an English first-class cricketer who played for Cambridge University Cricket Club. His highest score of 41 came when playing for Cambridge University in the match against Essex County Cricket Club.

== Early life and career ==
Alwyn was born on 13 June 1938 in Finchley, Middlesex, England. He was the son of the composers William Alwyn and Olive Alwyn. He had an older brother, the directorJonathan Alwyn.

Nicholas Alwyn matriculated at Gonville and Caius College, University of Cambridge, in 1957. He initially read history but later transferred to the Music Tripos for the second part of his undergraduate course.

During his time at Cambridge, he was a member of the university cricket club. He was awarded the degree of Bachelor of Music (MusB) by the university in 1959.
