= Cathy Gale =

Fictional character from the Avengers television series

- The Avengers character
- First appearance: "Mr. Teddy Bear"
- Last appearance: "Lobster Quadrille"
- Portrayed by: Honor Blackman (TV); Beth Chalmers (audio)

In-universe information
- Gender: Female
- Occupation: Anthropologist
- Nationality: British

Dr. Catherine "Cathy" Gale is a fictional character played by Honor Blackman, on the 1960s British series The Avengers. She was the first regular female partner of John Steed, following the departure of Steed's original male co-star, Dr David Keel (played by Ian Hendry). She made her first appearance at the start of the series' second season in 1962.

== Fictional biography ==
Initially, Gale was one of several rotating partners who worked with Steed (the others being medical man Dr Martin King and nightclub singer Venus Smith). By the third season, however, she was Steed's only partner.

Gale was born 5 October 1930. She was an anthropologist who married a farmer in Africa and there learned to hunt, fight and take care of herself. When her husband was killed, Gale returned to London to earn a Ph.D. in anthropology. She was the curator of a museum when she first encountered John Steed and agreed to work alongside him from 1962 to 1964. She is engaged in charities.

The relationship between Steed and Gale was marked by sexual tension of a type absent from later partners, plus Gale and Steed also had a rocky working relationship, with Gale not always appreciative of Steed's methods nor his habit of "volunteering" her for missions. Still, the two appear to have become quite close as the episode "The Golden Eggs" has her actually living in Steed's apartment as she searches for a new home of her own (the reason for her displacement is not revealed). In keeping with The Avengers' policy of avoiding direct references to romance between the two leads, however, it's quickly stated that Steed is actually sleeping at a nearby hotel.

Cathy Gale was considered a trail-blazing female character for British television, displaying a level of self-assurance and physical prowess rarely seen in women on television before that time. Her later mode of dress — a leather outfit designed to make it easier for Gale to fight — started a fashion trend, as did her wearing of what were dubbed "kinky boots". (The term became a catch phrase and Honor Blackman and her co-star Patrick Macnee even recorded a single entitled "Kinky Boots".) The influence of Cathy Gale could be felt in productions on both sides of the Atlantic; characters considered to have been influenced by her in some way include the TV version of Honey West and the Doctor Who character Sara Kingdom, as well as the character who succeeded her in The Avengers, Emma Peel.

Blackman left the series after its third season in order to co-star in the James Bond film Goldfinger. She was replaced by actress Diana Rigg as Emma Peel, who continued Gale's habit of wearing leather during action sequences until she was given her own unique costuming when series production switched to colour.

The Emma Peel episode "Too Many Christmas Trees" sees Steed receive a Christmas card from Mrs Gale, and he wonders what she can be doing in Fort Knox, a cheeky reference to Blackman's appearance as Pussy Galore in Goldfinger (the climax of the film takes place at the U.S. gold repository there).

Another reference was made to Catherine Gale in the Tara King episode "Pandora", where the names Cathy Gale and Emma Peel are seen on two envelope folders.

She was featured on an episode of The New Avengers, "The Midas Touch", where Steed had a woman visiting at his place, while he had an 8×10 colour photo of her, along with two other photos that included Emma Peel and Tara King. Aside from a cameo by Emma Peel in part one of "K is for Kill", this was the only other time in the revival series that characters from the original were directly referenced.

Unlike her successors, she was rarely knocked unconscious and usually managed to fend off abduction attempts.

== Reception ==
Dave Rogers writes in The Complete Avengers: The Full Story of Britain's Smash Crime-Fightin Team!: "Most people enjoyed the show's originality, and the Cathy Gale character, as one of the screen's earliest liberated women, was a revelation."

In the British Film Institute's 1996 tribute book, The Avengers, Toby Miller writes: "Mrs Gale was known from the first for her clothes, designed by Michael Whittaker with a view to being six months ahead of women's fashions. Guns were kept at different moments in a garter under her culottes, in her armpit, and then in a compact. She wore knee-high boots, tailored leather suits and a trench coat at a time when such outfits were only seen in porn magazines and fetishist outlets." He further writes that "Mrs Gale was straightforward and virtuous as well as sensual, Steed slightly untrustworthy, wilful and exciting: a 'sophisticate but not lacking in virility'. Unlike Mrs Peel, Mrs Gale is a Monica Seles avant la lettre, squealing and screaming as she does battle with assailants in ways that made a few male viewers anxious."

== Other media ==
Beth Chalmers voiced Mrs. Gale in Big Finish's 2017 audio adaptation of the Avengers novel Too Many Targets.

Status
Preceded by Patrick Macnee	Oldest living The Avengers star Played by Honor Blackman; June 25, 2015 – April 5, 2020	Succeeded by Diana Rigg
