= Patricia Denys =

British actress (1937–2024)

- Born: Patricia Bernice Sneyd; 6 September 1937; London, England
- Died: 4 November 2024 (aged 87); London, England
- Education: RADA
- Occupation: Actress
- Spouse: David J. Prole (m. 1981)

Patricia Bernice Prole (née Sneyd; 6 September 1937 – 4 November 2024), better known by the stage name Patricia Denys, was a British actress.

== Life and career ==
Patricia Bernice Sneyd was born in London on 6 September 1937. She trained at RADA, graduating in 1960. In her final year at RADA she receiving the Silver Medal and Emile Littler award.

Denys died in London on 4 November 2024, aged 87.

== Filmography ==
=== Television ===
Year	Title	Role	Notes
1961	Deadline Midnight		2 episodes
1963	The Rag Trade	Betty	12 episodes
1963–1966	Sergeant Cork		3 episodes
1964	The Wednesday Play	Delia Ziegler	Episode: "The July Plot"
1965	Redcap	Lotte Leibrun	Episode: "A Question of Initiative"
1965	Public Eye	Jane Tindall	Episode: "Dig You Later"
1966	Emergency Ward 10	Miss Maxwell	2 episodes
1966	The Troubleshooters	Marion Flood	Episode: "No Such Thing as Luck"
1966	Out of the Unknown	Woman	Episode: "Level Seven"
1967	Softly, Softly	WPC Raikes	Episode: "What Colour a Wolf?"
1970	Thirty-Minute Theatre	Mrs. Maxwell Reece	Episode: "Waugh on Crime: In Which Inspector Waugh Encounters the English Class System"
1973	The Tomorrow People	Mrs. Jameson	2 episodes
1973	New Scotland Yard	Joyce Ross	Episode: "Bullet in a Haystack"
1976	Z-Cars	Ellen Cookson	Episode: "Hunch"
1977	Mr. Big	Waitress	Episode: "The Bank Job"
1980	Charles Endell Esquire	Linda Croall	Episode: "Stuff Me a Flamingo"
