= Jon Rollason =

English actor, writer (1931–2016)

- Born: Jon Roger Rollinson; 9 April 1931; Birmingham, England, U.K.
- Died: 20 February 2016 (aged 84); Llandudno, Wales, U.K.
- Occupations: Actor; broadcaster; writer; councillor
- Years active: 1955–2016
- Known for: The Avengers; The Web of Fear
- Spouse: Shirley Rollason Janet Rollason

Jon Rollason (9 April 1931 – 20 February 2016) was an English television actor, broadcaster and writer.

He is remembered for the role of Dr. Martin King in the television series The Avengers. He appeared in episodes of Doctor Who (as Harold Chorley in The Web of Fear), Z-Cars, Coronation Street, Softly, Softly, and the soap opera Crossroads. For the last of these, he also wrote the scripts for some episodes.

== Early life and education ==
Rollason was born on 9 April 1931 in Birmingham, and went to drama school at The Old Vic in London after completing his National Service.

== Career ==
One of his first acting jobs was as an understudy to Sir Laurence Olivier in the West End production of John Osborne's play The Entertainer. One of his first major roles was in Joan Littlewood's production of The Quare Fellow by Brendan Behan, in which he starred alongside Richard Harris; he then spent several years at the Birmingham Repertory Theatre, and appeared in stage productions of Henry VI (parts I, II and III), The Boy David and The Critic.

This led to much radio and television work throughout the 1950s, 1960s and 1970s in some of Britain's top-rated shows, including The Avengers, Coronation Street, Z-Cars, Swizzlewick, Softly Softly, Doctor Who, Crossroads, Barlow and Robin's Nest, along with, among other work, a part in the world-premiere broadcast of Harold Pinter's The Dwarves on BBC Radio 3.

Rollason continued to act and also wrote for television; he co-created the 1969 BBC One series Special Project Air. His writing work for television expanded, notably including daytime soap opera Crossroads, after he gained a job as a contract writer for ATV in the mid-to-late 1970s.

He was also a published author and scriptwriter for radio, spent time writing and presenting for major international conferences, and went on to write speeches for the bosses of Audi, Jaguar and Rover and – in the United States – Ford, as well as writing television documentaries and commercials. In addition, he worked as a Llanrwst town councillor, and collected ceramics.

== Death ==
Rollason died on 20 February 2016 in Llandudno, Wales, at the age of 84.
