= Doug Robinson (stuntman) =

English actor and stuntman

- Robinson in A Stitch in Time, 1963
- Born: Douglas Bowbank Robinson; 8 February 1930; Newcastle upon Tyne, England
- Died: 16 December 2021 (aged 91)
- Occupations: Actor, stuntman
- Spouse: Ziki Robertson, 11th Baroness Wharton
- Relatives: Joe Robinson (brother)

Douglas Bowbank Robinson (8 February 1930 – 16 December 2021) was an English actor and stuntman.

== Life and career ==
Robinson was born in Newcastle upon Tyne, the son of Joseph Robinson and Stella Hurle. He was the brother of Joe Robinson, an actor and professional wrestler. His grandfather John was a heavyweight wrestler, and he was raised in South Africa, where he was a miner in Port Elizabeth. In 1951, he moved to England, and he originally was a bodybuilder. He began his screen career in 1954, appearing in the film Meet Mr. Callaghan. He and his brother Joe performed as fight coordinators in the ITV espionage television series The Avengers.

Later in his career, in 1963, Robinson played Euphemus, an Argonaut, in the film Jason and the Argonauts. He also stunt doubled for Doug McClure in the 1978 film Warlords of the Deep, and Gene Hackman in the 1980 film Superman II. He performed stunts in numerous films such as The Living Daylights, Indiana Jones and the Temple of Doom, Robin Hood: Prince of Thieves, Willow, Moonraker, Revenge of the Pink Panther, The Man with the Golden Gun, The Keep, A View to a Kill, Son of the Pink Panther, Diamonds Are Forever and The Empire Strikes Back.

== Death ==
Robinson died on 16 December 2021, at the age of 91.
