= Douglas Muir (actor) =

British actor (1904–1966)

Douglas Muir (5 November 1904, in Greenwich, London – 30 November 1966, in Chelsea, London) was a British film and television actor. known for The Appleyards (1952), Scrooge (1951) and his recurring role as Steed's boss in the Dr. David Keel/Cathy Gale era of TV's The Avengers. He was married to the actress Miriam Adams. Muir died on 30 November 1966 in Brompton Hospital, Chelsea, London.

== Filmography ==
Year	Title	Role	Notes
1951	Laughter in Paradise	Card Player	Uncredited
1951	Scrooge	Second Businessman	
1952	Wings of Danger	Dr. Wilner	Uncredited
1952	The Sound Barrier	Controller	Uncredited
1952	It Started in Paradise	1st Detective	Uncredited
1958	Another Time, Another Place	Card Player	Uncredited
1960	The Professionals	Beaumont	
1961	The Naked Edge	Police Clerk	Uncredited
1961	Out of the Shadow	Killer	
1961	Some Like It Cool	Colonel Willoughby-Muir	
1962	The Pot Carriers	Court Usher	
1962	Play It Cool	Briggs - Airport Official	Uncredited
1963	Girl in the Headlines	Fingerprint Expert	Uncredited
1967	The Double Man	Wilfred	(final film role)
