= Jonathan Alwyn =

British television director (1930–2021)

- Born: 10 October 1930; London, England
- Died: 29 August 2021 (aged 90); London, England
- Occupations: Television director, television producer
- Relatives: William Alwyn (father); Nicholas Alwyn (brother); Joe Alwyn (grandson)

Jonathan Alwyn (10 October 1930 – 29 August 2021) was a British television director and producer, known for his work on Mystery and Imagination, The Avengers , and The Rivals of Sherlock Holmes.

== Early life ==
Jonathan Alwyn was born on 10 October 1930 in London, England. He was the son of composer William Alwyn and his first wife, Olive Alwyn. He had a younger brother, Nicholas Alwyn.

== Career ==
Alwyn began his career in theatre, working as a stage manager at the Young Vic Theatre in 1950 under George Devine. The following year, he joined The Old Vic Theatre Company in a similar role.

In 1953, Alwyn moved into television, working in the children's department of BBC Television. He continued to work in television as a producer and director throughout his career.

== Personal life ==
In March 1957, Alwyn married Pamela Jackson. They had two children, including documentary filmmaker Richard Alwyn. He was also the grandfather of actor Joe Alwyn.

== Filmography ==
=== Director ===
Year	Title	Notes	Ref
1981	When the Boat Comes In	2 episodes	
1980–1981	Juliet Bravo	6 episodes	
1980	The Trial of Lady Chatterley	TV film	
1980	The Enigma Files	2 episodes	
1979	The Deep Concern	2 episodes	
1978–1980	Enemy at the Door	6 episodes	
1978	BBC2 Play of the Week	1 episode	
1977	The Onedin Line	3 episodes	
1977	Warship	3 episodes	
1977	The Mackinnons	2 episodes	
1976	Sutherland's Law	2 episodes	
1976	Couples	2 episodes	
1976	Killers	1 episode	
1976	Life and Death of Penelope	1 episode	
1974–1975	Six Days of Justice	6 episodes	
1974–1975	Moody and Pegg	3 episodes	
1974–1975	Rooms	6 episodes	
1974	Dial M For Murder	6 episodes	
1974	Napoleon and Love	2 episodes	
1974	Bedtime Stories	1 episode	
1973–1975	Public Eye	6 episodes	
1971–1973	The Rivals of Sherlock Holmes	7 episodes	
1972	Callan	1 episode	
1972	Man at the Top	1 episode	
1971	Brett	4 episodes	
1971	The Mind of Mr. J.G. Reeder	1 episode	
1970–1971	Doomwatch	5 episodes	
1970	Ryan International	3 episodes	
1969	Special Branch	1 episode	
1969	Detective	2 episodes	
1969	Tower of London: The Innocent	TV Film	
1969	Dr. Finlay's Casebook	1 episode	
1968	The Root of All Evil?	1 episode	
1968	Mystery and Imagination	1 episode	
1967	Haunted	2 episodes	
1966	Intrigue	1 episode	
1965	Redcap	1 episode	
1964	Miss Adventure	3 episodes	
1962–1972	Armchair Theatre	18 episodes	
1964	The Protectors	3 episodes	
1962–1964	The Avengers	7 episodes	
1962	Jezebel ex UK	2 episodes	
1962	Out of This World	2 episodes	
1961	Tales of Mystery	1 episode	
1961	ITV Play of the Week	1 episode	
1960–1961	No Hiding Place	4 episodes	
1959–1961	Boyd Q.C.	16 episodes	
1961	Top Secret	2 episodes	
1960	Close-up	1 episode	
1958–1960	ITV Television Playhouse	2 episodes	
1958	The Chinese Dagger	6 episodes	
1957–1959	Murder Bag	10 episodes	
1957	Destination Downing Street	8 episodes	
1957	The House That Jim Built		
1956	Mr. Papingay's Ship	2 episodes	
1955	The Little Round House	3 episodes	

=== Producer ===
Year	Title	Notes	Ref
1994	Under the Hammer	7 episodes	
1992	Maigret	6 episodes	
1990	Campion	8 episodes	
1989	Chelworth	8 episodes	
1983–1987	Bergerac	29 episodes	
1985	By the Sword Divided	10 episodes	
1982	Juliet Bravo	14 episodes	
1980	Enemy at the Door	13 episodes	
1971–1973	The Rivals of Sherlock Holmes	6 episodes	
1966–1968	Mystery and Imagination	18 episodes	
1961	ITV Play of the Week	1 episode	
1958–1960	ITV Television Playhouse	2 episodes	
1955	Simon's Treasure	TV Movie	
1954	The Scarlet Eagle	TV Movie	

=== Writer ===
Year	Title	Notes	Ref
1957	Dead Giveaway	6 episodes (From an idea by)	
1955	The Snow Queen	5 episodes (Adaptation)	
