= Honor Blackman =

British actress (1925–2020)

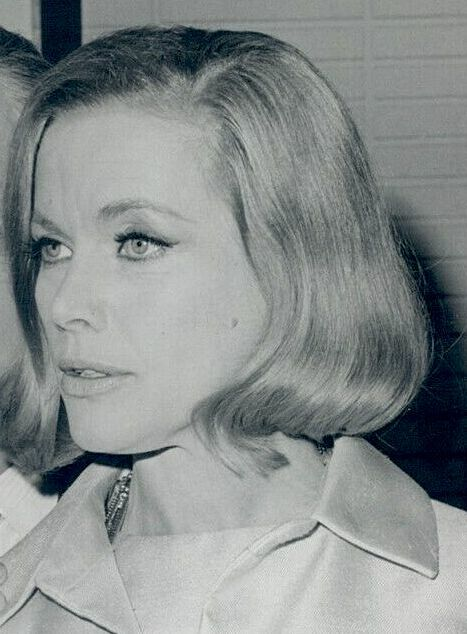
- Blackman in 1969
- Born: 22 August 1925; Canning Town, Essex, England
- Died: 5 April 2020 (aged 94); Lewes, East Sussex, England
- Education: Guildhall School of Music and Drama
- Occupations: Actress; singer
- Years active: 1947–2015
- Known for: Cathy Gale in The Avengers, Pussy Galore in Goldfinger
- Spouses: William E. Sankey (m. 1948; div. 1954) Maurice Kaufmann (m. 1961; div. 1975)
- Children: 2

Honor Blackman (22 August 1925 – 5 April 2020) was an English actress and singer, known for the roles of Cathy Gale in The Avengers (1962–1964), "Bond girl" Pussy Galore in Goldfinger (1964), Julia Daggett in Shalako (1968), and Hera in Jason and the Argonauts (1963). She is also known for her role as Laura West in the ITV sitcom The Upper Hand (1990–1996).

== Early life ==
Honor Blackman was born at 200 Cumberland Road, Canning Town, then in Essex, West Ham (now in the London Borough of Newham), England, the daughter of Edith Eliza (Stokes) and Frederick Blackman, a civil service statistician. She attended North Ealing Primary School and Ealing County Grammar School for Girls. For her 15th birthday, her parents gave her acting lessons and began her training at the Guildhall School of Music and Drama in 1940. While attending the Guildhall School, Blackman worked as a clerical assistant for the Home Office.

Following graduation, Blackman went into live theatre. She was an understudy in the West End play The Guinea Pig. In 1947 she appeared in the Patrick Hastings play The Blind Goddess at the Apollo Theatre.

== Career ==
=== Films ===
Blackman's film debut was a nonspeaking part in Fame Is the Spur (1947). Her other films include Quartet (1948), based on short stories by W. Somerset Maugham, starring Dirk Bogarde; Diamond City (1949), So Long at the Fair (1950), in which she again appeared with Dirk Bogarde; Green Grow the Rushes (1951), alongside Roger Livesey and Richard Burton; A Night to Remember (1958), an account of the Titanic disaster; the comedy The Square Peg (1958); Life at the Top (1965) with Laurence Harvey; The Virgin and the Gypsy (1970), and the Western films Shalako (1968) with Sean Connery and Brigitte Bardot, and Something Big (1971) with Dean Martin.

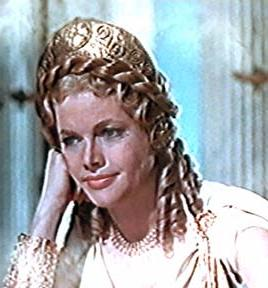
Blackman in the role of the goddess Hera in Jason and the Argonauts (1963)

She played Hera in Jason and the Argonauts (1963), which featured stop-motion animation by Ray Harryhausen. She had roles in the films Bridget Jones's Diary (2001) and Jack Brown and the Curse of the Crown (also 2001).

Cockneys vs Zombies (2012) was Blackman's final feature film appearance.

==== James Bond ====
During the 1960s, Blackman practised judo at the Budokwai dojo. This helped her prepare for her roles as Cathy Gale in the British television series The Avengers and Pussy Galore in Goldfinger (1964).

Albert R. Broccoli said Blackman was cast opposite Sean Connery in the Bond film on the basis of her success in The Avengers. He knew that most American audiences would not have seen the programme. Broccoli said, "The Brits would love her because they knew her as Mrs. Gale[;] the Yanks would like her because she was so good—it was a perfect combination."

=== Theatre ===
In 1968, Blackman appeared opposite John Neville and Hylda Baker in the musical play Mr & Mrs, based on the plays of Noël Coward. In the late 1970s, she toured Australia and New Zealand and Canada with Michael Craig and Colleen Clifford in the comedy play Move Over, Mrs Markham. In February 1979, she starred in Stephen Barry's production of Tom Stoppard's Night and Day at the Perth Playhouse, coinciding with Stoppard's presence as a participant in the Festival of Perth.

In 1981, she appeared in a London revival of The Sound of Music opposite Petula Clark. The production opened to rave reviews and the largest advance sale in British theatre history to that time. She spent most of 1987 at the Fortune Theatre starring as the Mother Superior in the West End production of Nunsense.

Blackman returned to the theatre in 2005, touring through 2006 with a production of My Fair Lady, in which she played Mrs. Higgins. She developed a one-woman show, Word of Honor, which premiered in October 2006. From April to September 2007, Blackman took over the role of Fraulein Schneider in Cabaret at the Lyric Theatre in London's West End.

=== Television ===
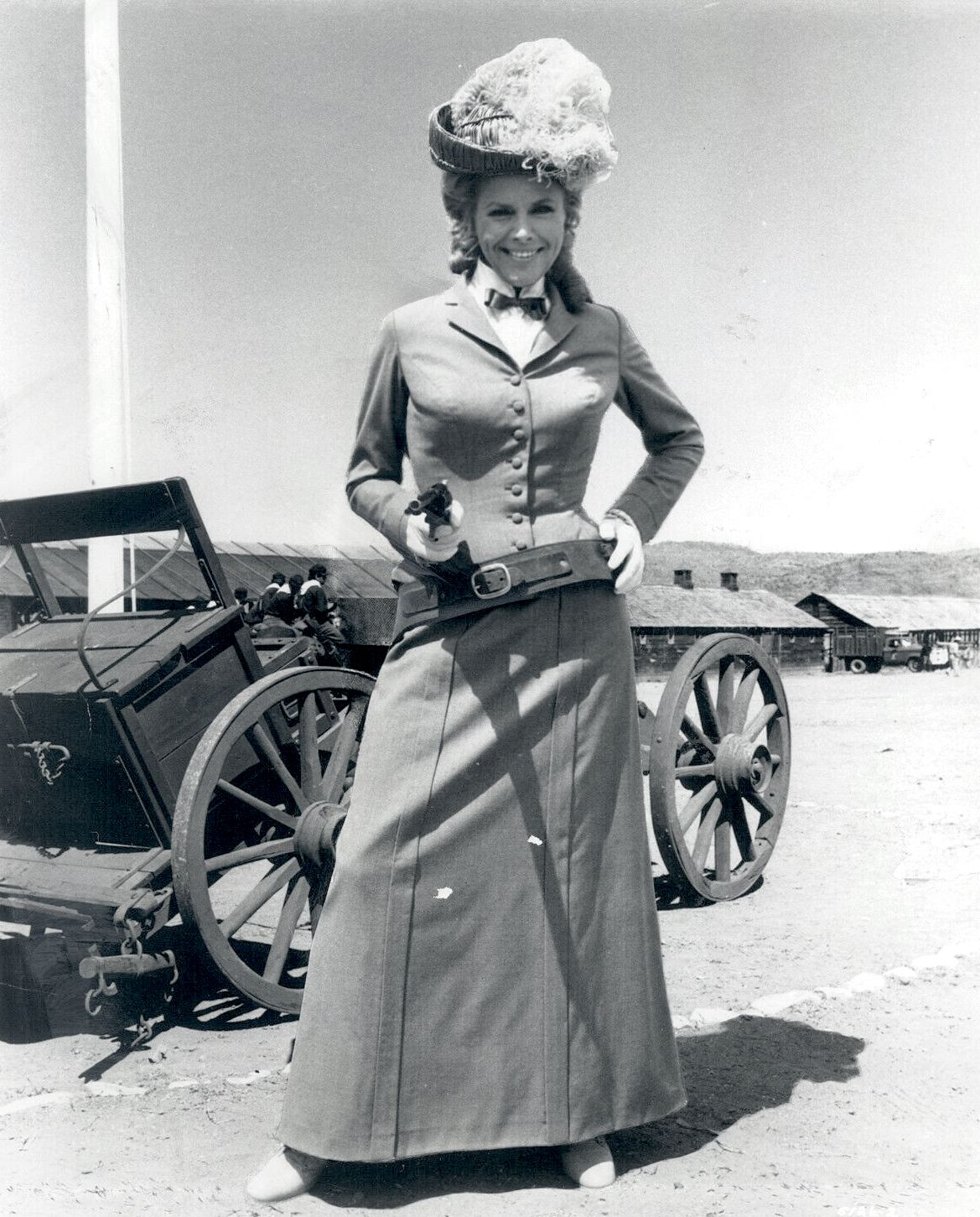
Blackman in a publicity photo for Something Big (1971)

Blackman started acting on television in the recurring role of Nicole, secretary/assistant to Dan Dailey's character of Tim Collier in the television series The Four Just Men (1959). In a 1960 episode of Danger Man titled "Colonel Rodriguez" she played Joan Bernard. In an episode of The Saint titled "The Arrow of God" (1962), Blackman played an adulterous personal secretary named Pauline Stone, who became one of several suspects in the murder of a despised gossip columnist.

In The Avengers from 1962 to 1964, she played Dr Cathy Gale, a self-assured, quick-witted anthropologist who was skilled in judo and had a passion for leather clothes. Gale was unlike any female character seen before on British TV. Blackman left the series after its third season to co-star in the James Bond film Goldfinger.

In an episode of The Avengers, "Too Many Christmas Trees" (1965), John Steed received a Christmas card from Cathy Gale. Reading the envelope, he says in a puzzled voice, "Whatever can she be doing at Fort Knox ...?" It was an inside joke, as Blackman was filming Goldfinger at the time.

In December 1969 and February 1993, Blackman was taken by surprise as the subject of This Is Your Life. In 1972, Blackman (as a special guest star) and Richard Basehart played a married pair of Shakespearean actors who commit murder in the American crime mystery series Columbo (episode "Dagger of the Mind"). In 1983, she appeared in a film production of Agatha Christie's novel, The Secret Adversary, in the role of Rita Vandemeyer, and as Juno/Empress Eugénie in the BBC television production of Orpheus in the Underworld.

In 1986, she had a role in "Terror of the Vervoids", a segment of the Doctor Who serial The Trial of a Time Lord. From 1990 to 1996, she appeared as Laura West on The Upper Hand. In 2003, Blackman took a guest role on Midsomer Murders, as ex-racing driver Isobel Hewitt in the episode "A Talent for Life". In September 2004, she briefly joined the Coronation Street cast in a storyline about wife swapping. In 2007, she participated in the BBC TV project The Verdict. She was one of 12 well-known figures who made up a jury to hear a fictional rape case. The series was designed to explore the jury system. She was sworn in as a juror as "Honor Kaufmann". In 2013, she guest-starred in the BBC medical drama Casualty and in By Any Means.

Blackman also appeared in a number of episodes of Never the Twain with Donald Sinden and Windsor Davies as veterinarian Veronica Barton.

=== Singing career ===
Blackman's recording with The Avengers co-star Patrick Macnee of "Kinky Boots" (1964), referring to the boots she wore in the show, failed to chart upon its original release, but became a surprise hit in 1990. The song peaked at number five after being played incessantly by BBC Radio 1 breakfast-show presenter Simon Mayo. After her appearance in Goldfinger, Blackman recorded a full album of songs titled Everything I've Got.

In 1968, Blackman released a 45 rpm record of "Before Today"/"I'll Always Be Loving You" (CBS 3896), which were featured in the musical play Mr & Mrs. In 1983, she sang as Juno in a special TV production of Jacques Offenbach's Orpheus in the Underworld.

On 6 July 2009, Blackman released a new single, "The Star Who Fell from Grace", composed by Jeff Chegwin and Adrian Munsey. She also compèred the James Bond Prom, part of the "Welsh Proms" concert series in 2009.

=== Other roles ===
Blackman appeared as Anahita in the Doctor Who audio drama The Children of Seth, released in December 2011.

== Personal life ==
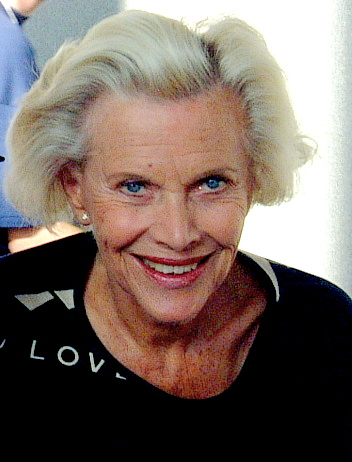
Blackman in 2000

Blackman was married to Walter "Bill" Sankey from 1948 to 1954. After their divorce, she married British actor Maurice Kaufmann (1961–75). They appeared together in the thriller film Fright (1971) and some stage productions. They adopted two children, a daughter and a son.

After her divorce from Kaufmann, she did not remarry and stated that she preferred being single. She enjoyed watching football.

Blackman owned a summer house in Islesboro, Maine, United States.

Blackman died at her home in Lewes, East Sussex, on 5 April 2020, aged 94, from natural causes.

=== Politics ===
Blackman was a Liberal Democrat and was previously a member of the Liberal Party, campaigning for the party during the 1964 general election. She declined a CBE in 2002, as she felt that as a republican it would be hypocritical to accept the award. She publicly supported changing the British electoral system from first-past-the-post to alternative vote for electing members to the House of Commons in the Alternative Vote referendum in 2011.

In 2012, Blackman publicly criticised actor Sean Connery, her Bond co-star in 1964, for his status as a tax exile. She said, "I disapprove of him strongly now. Because I don't think you should accept a title from a country and then pay absolutely no tax towards it. He wants it both ways. I don't think his principles are very high."

Following the death of Margaret Thatcher in April 2013, when asked about her thoughts on Thatcher, Blackman responded:

She's not my idea of Heaven, I have to say. Although she did some good things in her time, she was merciless about the unions. I'm not too happy about the Falklands, either. We lost men, we took injuries and we blew up a ship. I suppose we need it for a base, but my common sense tells me that it does belong more to Argentina than it does to us. Lots of people may throw things at me for saying that about Thatcher, but hopefully not during the performance. She was a powerful figure, but she did damn all for empowering women. She didn't surround herself with any women whatsoever or encourage women to come into politics or do anything in particular. She could have been a quite wonderful role model.

== Filmography ==
=== Film ===
Year	Title	Role	Notes
1947	Fame Is the Spur	Emma	Uncredited
1948	Daughter of Darkness	Julie Tallent	
1948	Quartet	Paula	Segment: "The Alien Corn"
1949	A Boy, a Girl and a Bike	Susie Bates	
1949	Conspirator	Joyce	
1949	Diamond City	Mary Hart	
1950	So Long at the Fair	Rhoda O'Donovan	
1951	Green Grow the Rushes	Meg Cuffley	
1952	Come Die My Love	Eva	
1954	The Rainbow Jacket	Mrs. Tyler	
1954	Diplomatic Passport	Marcelle	
1955	The Delavine Affair	Maxine Banner	
1955	The Glass Cage	Jenny Pelham	
1956	Breakaway	Paula Grant / Paula Jackson	
1957	You Pay Your Money	Susie Westlake	
1957	Suspended Alibi	Lynn Pearson	
1957	Danger List	Gillian Freeman	Short film
1957	Account Rendered	Sarah Hayward	
1958	A Night to Remember	Mrs. Liz Lucas	
1958	The Square Peg	Lesley Cartland	
1961	A Matter of WHO	Sister Bryan	
1962	Serena	Ann Rogers	
1963	Jason and the Argonauts	Hera	Voice
1964	Goldfinger	Pussy Galore	
1965	The Secret of My Success	Baroness Lily von Lukenberg	
1965	Life at the Top	Norah Hauxley	
1966	Moment to Moment	Daphne Fields	
1968	Shalako	Lady Julia Daggett	
1968	A Twist of Sand	Julie Chambois	
1968	The Last Roman	Amalaswintha	
1969	Twinky	Mummy	
1970	The Last Grenade	Katherine Whiteley	
1970	The Virgin and the Gypsy	Mrs. Fawcett	
1971	Fright	Helen Lloyd	
1971	Something Big	Mary Anna Morgan	
1976	To the Devil a Daughter	Anna Fountain	
1977	Age of Innocence	Mrs. Boswell	
1978	The Cat and the Canary	Susan Sillsby	
1998	Tale of the Mummy	Captain Shea	
1999	To Walk with Lions	Joy Adamson	
2001	Bridget Jones's Diary	Penny Husbands-Bosworth	
2004	Jack Brown and the Curse of the Crown	Madeline Dubouir	
2004	Girl Afraid		Short film
2005	Colour Me Kubrick	Madam	
2010	Reuniting the Rubins	Gran Rubin	
2012	I, Anna	Joan	
2012	Cockneys vs Zombies	Peggy	
2012	Money for Old Rope	Doris	Short film

=== Television ===
Year	Title	Role	Notes
1951	Joseph Proctor's Money	Ruth Marsh	TV Movie
1953	Little Red Monkey	Jocelyn Cullum	TV Movie
1954	The Fifth Season	Lorraine McKay	TV Movie
1954–1958	The Vise	Paula Hickson / Helen Stone / Syd Lewis / Sally Evans	4 episodes
1956	The Infinite Shoeback	Mary	TV Movie
1956	Flame in the Forest	Christine Gould	TV Movie
1956	Douglas Fairbanks, Jr., Presents	Kathy	Season 4 Episode 29: "The Way Home"
1956	The Three Musketeers	Yvonne / Charlotte Brion	2 episodes
1956–1967	ITV Play of the Week	Louise Rogers / Liz Essendine	2 episodes
1957	Boyd Q.C.	Mary Allen	Season 1 Episode 8: "The Open and Shut Case"
1957	The New Adventures of Charlie Chan	Elizabeth Vernon	Season 1 Episode 9: "The Patient in Room 21"
1957	Hour of Mystery	Mary Redox	Season 1 Episode 19: "One Must Die"
1958	The Invisible Man	Katherine	Season 1 Episode 9: "Blind Justice"
1958	African Patrol	Pat Murray / Grace Bowler / Isobel Thorne	3 episodes
1959	Probation Officer	Iris Cope	9 episodes (Recurring role)
1959–1960	The Four Just Men	Nicole	10 episodes (Recurring role)
1960	Suspense	Diana	Season 1 Episode 7: "Point of Honour"
1960	The Third Man	Maureen	Season 2 Episode 18: "The Widow Who Wasn't"
1960	Danger Man	Joan Bernard	Season 1 Episode 15: "Colonel Rodriguez"
1961	Knight Errant Limited	Lady Cambroke	Season 3 Episode 24: "King Charles' Head"
1961	Bootsie and Snudge	Flag Seller	Season 1 Episode 37: "Rally Round the Flag"
1961	The Pursuers	Sue Brooks	Season 1 Episode 13: "The Frame"
1961	Top Secret	Rauch / Diana	2 episodes
1962	Ghost Squad	Laura	Season 2 Episode 3: "Princess"
1962	The Saint	Pauline Stone	Season 1 Episode 7: "The Arrow of God"
1962–1964	The Avengers	Cathy Gale	Series regular (Season 2-3)
1967	ABC Stage 67	Jane & Jill Marriott	Season 1 Episode 25: "The Wide Open Door"
1968	Armchair Theatre	Anne	Season 8 Episode 21: "Recount"
1968	ITV Playhouse	Lena Hamilton	Season 2 Episode 12: "The Explorer"
1969	The Name of the Game	Bethany Cromwell	Season 1 Episode 26: "An Agent of the Plaintiff"
1970	ITV Saturday Night Theatre	Gillian Groome	Season 3 Episode 4: "Visit from a Stranger"
1972	Boney	Mary Answorth	Season 1 Episode 1: "Boney in Venom House"
1972	Columbo	Lillian Stanhope	Season 2 Episode 4: "Dagger of the Mind"
1974–1975	The Lives of Benjamin Franklin	Margaret Stevenson	Miniseries (2 episodes)
1977	Jubilee	Lady Harriet	Season 1 Episode 6: "Wind of Change"
1977–1978	Robin's Nest	Marion Nicholls	2 episodes
1979	Crown Court	Jean Frazer Allardyce	Season 8 Episode 52: "Heart to Heart: Part 1"
1981–1982	Never the Twain	Veronica Barton	5 episodes
1982	Holding the Fort	Lavinia Cattermole	Season 3 Episode 6: "Otherwise Engaged"
1983	In Performance	Juno / Empress Eugenie	Episode: "Orpheus in the Underworld"
1983	Partners in Crime	Rita Vandemeyer	Season 1 Episode 0: "The Secret Adversary"
1984	Lace	Selma	Miniseries
1984	The First Olympics: Athens 1896	Madam Ursula Schumann	Miniseries
1985	Minder	Helen Spender	Season 6 Episode 7: "Minder on the Orient Express"
1986	Doctor Who	Professor Lasky	Serial: "Terror of the Vervoids"
1987	Crossbow	Blonde Noblewoman	Season 1 Episode 9: "The Bet"
1989	Voice of the Heart	Doris Asterman	TV Movie
1990–1996	The Upper Hand	Laura West	Series regular
1994	ABC Weekend Specials	Mrs. Medlock (Voice)	Season 15 Episode 1: "The Secret Garden"
2000	Doctors	Rachel Knott	Season 1 Episode 33: "A Helping Hand"
2000	The Sight	Margaret Smith	TV Movie
2001	The Armando Iannucci Shows	Ivy Diner (Uncredited)	Season 1 Episode 3: "Mortality"
2001	Dr. Terrible's House of Horrible	Transeet Van Eyre	Season 1 Episode 1: "Lesbian Vampire Lovers of Lust"
2001	Jack and the Beanstalk: The Real Story	Jules – Jack's Secretary	Miniseries
2002	The American Embassy	Mrs. Wellington	Season 1 Episode 5: "Agent Provocateur"
2003	Midsomer Murders	Isobel Hewitt	Season 6 Episode 1: "A Talent for Life"
2003	The Royal	Mrs. Lyons	3 episodes
2004	Revolver	Sheila	5 episodes
2004	Coronation Street	Rula Romanoff	5 episodes
2005	New Tricks	Kitty Campbell	Season 2 Episode 4: "Old and Cold"
2005	Summer Solstice	Countess Lucinda Rhives	TV Movie
2009	Hotel Babylon	Constance Evergreen	Season 4 Episode 3: "Episode #4.3"
2013	Casualty	Agatha Kirkpatrick	Season 28 Episode 1: "Bedside Manners"
2013	By Any Means	Celia Butler	Season 1 Episode 3: "Episode #1.3"
2015	You, Me & Them	Rose Walker	Season 2 Episode 1: "The Other Mother"

=== Audio ===
Year	Title	Role	Notes
2011	Doctor Who: The Lost Stories	Anahita	Season 3 Episode 3: "The Children of Seth"

== Theatre ==
Year	Title	Role	Notes
1946–1947	The Gleam	Monica Cartwright	The Globe Theatre and Theatre Royal, Brighton
1947–1948	The Blind Goddess	Mary Dering	Apollo Theatre. Theatre Royal, Brighton, and other locations.
1950–1951	Desirable Lady		Theatre Royal, Bath
1954	The Fifth Season	Lorraine McKay	Lyceum Theatre, Cambridge Theatre and other locations.
1954	The Moonraker	Anne Beaumont	Theatre Royal, Windsor
1955	Komuso	Karin Ballentine	Arts Theatre, London
1956	Someone to Talk To	Isabel Tyson	Duchess Theatre
1966–1968	Wait Until Dark	Susy Henderson	Strand Theatre, Duchess Theatre and other locations.
1968–1969	Mr & Mrs	(MR) Doris / (MRS) Laura Jesson	Palace Theatre, London and Palace Theatre, Manchester
1969	Who Killed Santa Claus?	Barbara	Theatre Royal, Windsor
1970	Who Killed Santa Claus?	Barbara	Piccadilly Theatre, Grand Theatre and other locations
1972	Night Watch	Pamela Wheeler	Theatre Royal, York, Pavilion Theatre, Bournemouth, and other locations.
1973	Odd Girl Out		Harlow Playhouse, Wimbledon Theatre, and other locations.
1975	The Exorcism	Margaret	Comedy Theatre
1976	Motive	Paula Cramer	Yvonne Arnaud Theatre, Ashcroft Theatre and other locations.
1977	The Deep Blue Sea	Hester Collyer	Birmingham Repertory Theatre, Theatre Royal, Bath, and other locations
1978	The Letter	Leslie Crosbie	Birmingham Repertory Theatre, Theatre Royal, Bath, and other locations
1981	Rose	Rose	Key Theatre, Peterborough, Richmond Theatre, and other locations
1981–1982	The Sound of Music	Elsa Schraeder	Apollo Victoria Theatre
1984–1985	On Your Toes	Peggy Porterfield	Palace Theatre
1987–1988	Nunsense	Sister Mary Regina	Fortune Theatre, London
1989	The Young Idea	Jennifer Brent	Yvonne Arnaud Theatre
1994	Dishonorable Ladies		Criterion Theatre
2000	Mademoiselle Colombe	Madame Alexandra	Old Rep Theatre, Birmingham and Bridewell Theatre
2006	The Kingfisher	Evelyn	New Theatre, Cardiff, Cambridge Arts Theatre, and other locations
2006–2008	Cabaret	Fraulein Schneider (Replacement)	Lyric Theatre
