= Spy-fi (subgenre) =

Subgenre of spy fiction that includes elements of science fiction

Spy-fi is a subgenre of spy fiction that includes elements of science fiction, and is often associated with the Cold War. Features of spy-fi include the effects of technology on the espionage trade and the technological gadgets used by the characters, even though the technologies and gadgets portrayed are well beyond contemporary scientific reality.

== Definition and characteristics ==
Spy-fi can be defined as media that centers around the adventures of a protagonist (or protagonists) working as a secret agent or a spy. Usually, these adventures will revolve around defeating a rival superpower or singular enemy from achieving a nefarious aim. Content may include themes such as world domination, world destruction, futuristic weapons, and gadgets. Settings vary from outright fantasy, such as outer space or under the sea, to real but exotic locations. Spy-fi does not necessarily present espionage as it is practiced in reality but rather glamorizes spy-craft through its focus on high-tech equipment, agencies, and organizations with nearly limitless resources and incredibly high-stakes adventures.

The spy protagonist may discover in their investigation that a mad scientist or evil genius and their secret organization are using futuristic technology to further their schemes. Examples of these include the James Bond film series, the use of advanced scientific technologies for global influence or domination in The Baroness spy novels, using space travel technology to destroy the world as in Kiss the Girls and Make Them Die, weather control in Our Man Flint, using a sonic weapon in Dick Barton Strikes Back, a death ray in Dick Barton at Bay, or replacing world leaders with evil twins in In Like Flint.

== Examples ==
=== Film and television ===
- Agents of S.H.I.E.L.D. (TV series)
- Alias (TV series)
- Austin Powers (film series)
- The Avengers (TV series)
- Danger Man (TV series)
- Face/Off
- Get Smart (TV series)
- Himitsu Sentai Gorenger
- James Bond (film series)
- Kamen Rider ZEZTZ
- The Man from U.N.C.L.E. (TV series)
- Matt Helm (film series)
- Men in Black
- Mission: Impossible (TV series)
- Spy Kids
- Spycies (film)
- The Prisoner (TV series)
- Sky Captain and the World of Tomorrow
- Tenet
- Where on Earth Is Carmen Sandiego? (TV series)

=== Video games ===
- Global Agenda
- I Expect You to Die
- Invisible Inc.
- Metal Gear
- No One Lives Forever
- Perfect Dark

== See also ==
- Cross-genre
- Techno-thriller
