= The Forget-Me-Knot =

1968 episode of The Avengers, season 6

- The Avengers episode
- Episode no.: Season 6 Episode 1
- Directed by: James Hill
- Teleplay by: Brian Clemens
- Original air dates: 20 March 1968 (ABC, US); 25 September 1968 (Thames, UK)

Guest appearances
- Patrick Kavanagh; Jeremy Burnham; Jeremy Young

Episode chronology
← Previous "Mission: Highly Improbable"	Next → "Game"

"The Forget-Me-Knot" is the first episode of the sixth series of the 1960s cult British spy-fi television series The Avengers, starring Patrick Macnee and Diana Rigg, and introducing Linda Thorson as Tara King. Its first broadcast was on the US ABC network on 20 March 1968 (half way through the third US season). Its first UK broadcast was on 25 September 1968 by Thames Television, who commissioned this series of the show for the ITV network. The episode was directed by James Hill, and written by Brian Clemens.

== Plot ==
Agent Sean Mortimer arrives at Steed's flat with what appears to be a severe case of amnesia. Crucially, Mortimer does remember that there is a traitor in the organisation. Steed then goes to the leader of their organisation with George Burton, a fellow spy, "Mother", who is a man in a wheelchair, and reports that the missing Mortimer has been found. But when Steed goes back to his flat he finds Mortimer missing and Mrs Peel only remembering partial things, so Steed reports this to "Mother", who requests that Mrs Peel be brought to him, and so Steed tells her that they are visiting a "Professor Mater" for a party, and that Mater works on anthropology, which Mrs Peel is interested in.

Steed's car is ambushed on the road, and he gets shot with a peculiar device by two men, and Mrs. Peel is taken to "the glass house", where she meets Mortimer again, whose memory has been taken again. Mrs. Peel and Mortimer attempt to figure out their names by what they remember, but fail (at first Mrs. Peel and Mortimer call themselves "Steed" and "Peel" respectively). Meanwhile, Steed wakes up in a hospital, being treated by a doctor who thinks he is just drunk, but, managing to escape, he finds Tara King's address in his shoe (he had met her when visiting "Mother" earlier, and slipped her address into it). He goes to her house, and she tells him his name and address, but while he goes back to his flat and tries to remember things (Mrs Peel's face keeps flashing through his mind) Tara is shot with the peculiar device which lost Steed his memory, and she cannot remember that she knows Steed's innocence of being the traitor, but just that he is a suspect for it.

Steed remembers "Mother"'s address, and goes to it, but is met by Burton. Steed says that he can remember he was ambushed, and that Mrs Peel was sent to "the glass house", which he then remembers was his old training facility. Steed goes to it, accompanied by a seemingly sceptical Burton, who gives him directions to it. But Steed, who remembers that Burton entered the organisation after "the glass house" was closed, and realises that Burton is the traitor. Burton attempts to get away, but Mrs Peel, who remembers, escapes in the nick of time with Mortimer, whose memory has been taken yet again, and shoots Burton so that he does not remember he was trying to get away.

Shortly afterwards, John Steed learns from a newspaper that unexpectedly Emma Peel's long-lost husband, the air ace Peter Peel, has been found alive in the Amazonian jungle, so Mrs Peel is leaving. She gets in a car with a man who looks very much like Steed, and drives off, while Tara comes up to Steed's flat, revealing she is his new partner.

== Cast ==
- Patrick Macnee as John Steed
- Diana Rigg as Emma Peel
- Linda Thorson as Tara King
- Patrick Kavanagh as Sean Mortimer
- Patrick Newell as Mother
- Jeremy Burnham as Simon Filson
- Jeremy Young as George Burton
- Alan Lake as Karl
- Doug Sheldon as Brad
- John Lee as Dr Soames
- Beth Owen as Sally
- Leon Lissek as Taxi Driver
- Tony Thawton as Jenkins
- Edward Higgins as Giles
- Paul Weston as Peter Peel (uncredited)

== Production ==
"The Forget-Me-Knot" was not originally part of the planned sixth season of The Avengers. Having decided to cast Linda Thorson as Steed's new sidekick Tara King, producer John Bryce had started filming episodes with the character already in place and - as with her predecessors - no introduction. However Bryce was fired midway through production of the third episode, and the previous series producers, Albert Fennell and Brian Clemens, were re-hired. Clemens abandoned the episode whose production was underway (entitled "The Great, Great Britain Crime", scenes of which were later salvaged for the episode entitled "Homicide and Old Lace"). Instead, he decided that there needed to be a continuity explanation for the replacement of Mrs Peel by Tara King, and set about hastily developing a storyline which would account for this. Diana Rigg's scenes were shot in four days in December 1967 with production completed the following month. A "handover" scene featuring both characters was filmed on the last day of Rigg's contract with ABC Television on 19 December 1967.

As this episode features both Peel from Series 5 and King from Series 6, some releases and some reference books treat this episode as the 25th episode of Series 5, even though that is not how it was originally broadcast in the UK. The opening credits remain the same as that of Series 5, while the closing credits utilize the sequence from early episodes of Series 6; as a result, audiences would have to wait until the first full Tara King episode's opening credits to learn why Steed's hat has a hole in it, as shown in the closing (at least in the U.S.; the original UK broadcasts used a different opening, so viewers there never found out until later broadcast/home media release). Also, while Diana Rigg is credited in the opening, she does not receive screen credit during the closing as she did previously.
