= John Bryce (producer) =

Scottish television producer

- Born: John Norman Bryce; 17 December 1933; Edinburgh, Scotland
- Died: 18 July 1990 (aged 56); London, England
- Occupations: Film and television producer, script editor
- Spouse: Gillian Mary Bryce (née Howard)
- Children: James Timothy Bryce (b 1972), Jennifer Elizabeth Bryce (b 1976)

John Norman Bryce (born 17 December 1933, Edinburgh) was a Scottish former television producer. He is best known for his work on the 1960s series The Avengers.

== Career ==
Bryce was educated at the prestigious Fettes College. In the late 1950s he joined the script department of Associated British Picture Corporation (ABPC). He worked as a story editor on a number of series produced by ABC Weekend TV—a subsidiary of ABPC—before joining The Avengers. He worked in this capacity for much of the first season (1961) and the first half of the second season (1962) before replacing Leonard White as producer midway through the latter season. Bryce continued as producer for the entirety of the third season (1963), which was the second and final series featuring the character of Cathy Gale (Honor Blackman). It was Bryce who, on the advice of Patrick Macnee, altered Cathy Gale's role to be the finer balance of femininity and strength for which The Avengers became renowned. In the preceding series Mrs Gale's character had been cooler towards Macnee's character John Steed, to the point of opposition.

Bryce was linked with a planned Avengers film project which had been mooted to follow the third series; however, before production could even be planned, Honor Blackman announced her departure. Although Bryce began the search for a replacement, it was an entirely new production team headed by Julian Wintle which took the fourth series forward, with Diana Rigg joining Macnee.

Bryce went to produce a number of other ABC series following The Avengers, including Public Eye with Alfred Burke and Redcap featuring John Thaw. In 1967, he was again approached to head production of what would be the sixth series of The Avengers. The initial task was to find a replacement for Diana Rigg, who had elected not to renew her contract; Bryce chose the relatively inexperienced Linda Thorson, with whom he was also in a relationship at the time. The instruction from ABC was that the series had become too 'gimmicky' and far-fetched, and the new episodes were to be more subdued and realistic.

Bryce set about developing a feature-length series opener entitled "Invitation to a Killing"; this was to introduce Thorson's character Tara King, who was (as with her predecessors) already known to and working with Steed. "Invasion of the Earthmen" followed, and work was in progress on the third episode, entitled "The Great, Great Britain Crime" when word came from the series' American sponsors that they wanted the outlandish, more fantasy-based element of the series to continue. This, coupled with Bryce's lengthy production time per episode, led to a decision to bring back the previous team, headed by Albert Fennell and Brian Clemens, and Bryce again parted company with the series.

Bryce later worked as executive producer at London Weekend Television and at ABC's successor, Thames Television. In 1975 he retired to the village of Sancreed,Cornwall, later working as a writing teacher at the National Film and Television School. , He died in Camden, London in July 1990.
