= The Town of No Return =

- The Avengers episode
- Screen title.
- Episode no.: Season 4 Episode 1
- Directed by: Roy Ward Baker: Peter Graham Scott (uncredited)
- Written by: Brian Clemens
- Original air date: 28 September 1965

Guest appearances
- Alan MacNaughton; Patrick Newell; Terence Alexander; Jeremy Burnham; Robert Brown; Juliet Harmer

Episode chronology
← Previous "Lobster Quadrille"	Next → "The Gravediggers"

"The Town of No Return" is the first episode of the fourth series of the 1960s cult British spy-fi television series The Avengers, starring Patrick Macnee and Diana Rigg in her Avengers debut, and guest starring Alan MacNaughton, Patrick Newell, Terence Alexander. It was first broadcast on ABC Weekend TV on 28 September 1965. The episode was written by Brian Clemens, directed by Roy Ward Baker, and produced by Brian Clemens.

== Plot ==
On a beach a shifty man is attending to his lobster pots when a man emerges from the tide concealed in a watertight black covering; he walks up the beach, removes the covering, and says good morning to the man and walks off.

After a bout of fencing at Mrs. Peel's flat, Steed and Mrs Peel leave on a train to visit Little Bazeley by the Sea, a village in Norfolk where agents have been reported to go missing. On the train they share a carriage with a portly gentleman, Jimmy Smallwood (played by Patrick Newell, who would later become a semi-regular Avengers cast member playing spymaster "Mother"), who is going to visit his brother the local blacksmith. On arrival Steed, Peel and Smallwood are shadowed by the shifty local man from the beach. At the local inn, the Inebriated Gremlin, they are served by landlord Piggy Warren, who introduces them to Mark Brandon, the school inspector, and Jill Manson, a teacher. Mrs Peel announces herself as a new teacher, assigned by the ministry to the local school. When Smallwood leaves to visit his brother the blacksmith, several strange men in boots with rifles depart through the inn and follow him. Meanwhile, Steed and Mrs Peel find their rooms in a shabby state, with the shutters nailed shut. Smallwood fails to find his brother, and heads for the church, followed by the shifty local. Later the shifty local is seen hunting Smallwood across the landscape with bloodhounds. This is heard back at the village and dismissed by Piggy as "badger hunting".

The following morning Steed and Mrs Peel examine strange footprints leading out of the sea and up the beach and find Smallwood dead and buried in the sand to their dismay and confusion.

Mrs Peel visits the school and finds it and the teachers very unusual. She discovers that the school has been unused for years and a large number of adult sized Wellington boots are stored there. She visits the local church where the vicar shows her the parish records, of which several decades are missing.

Meanwhile, Steed investigates the old wartime airfield and finds it in a similarly derelict state. Steed discovers a mention of a pilot, killed in 1942, named Piggy Warren: the name used by the pub landlord. Both Mrs Peel and Steed learn that the village folk are impostors and are hiding something. They seek out Smallwood's brother and find the shifty looking local who owns the bloodhounds pretending to be the blacksmith. Earlier they had seen a photo of Smallwood's brother so they know that he too is an impostor.

While Mrs Peel is investigating the school, an elderly man – the real School inspector – runs in, pursued by the phony school inspector and the shifty local, and says little but "below, below" before dying. Mrs Peel revisits the church and confronts the vicar, who suddenly pulls out a gun and reveals he is also an impostor. Mrs Peel is tied up in the blacksmith's until Steed arrives, overpowers the shifty local and frees her.

In the school, Steed and Mrs Peel discover enough food to feed an army. Mrs Peel reveals a diagram on the back of the old blackboard of Britain and a submarine in the North Sea. Wondering where have all the people gone, they surmise that this is a gradual invasion by a foreign power: small groups have been dispatched from a submarine located in the North Sea, explaining the bootprints at the beach and adult sized Wellington boots at the school, replacing the locals one by one until only the invaders remain.

Heeding the dying man's words, they head to the old airfield's underground bunkers. There they discover a small army of enemy agents and a big supply of explosives and some high tech equipment. Steed and Mrs Peel are eventually found by some of the impostors; a fight ensues before they overpower them and leave after sealing the invaders permanently underground. They depart the village on a motor scooter driven by Mrs Peel.

== Cast ==
- Patrick Macnee as John Steed
- Diana Rigg as Emma Peel
- Alan MacNaughtan as Mark Brandon
- Patrick Newell as Jimmy Smallwood
- Terence Alexander as 'Piggy' Warren
- Jeremy Burnham as Vicar, Jonathan Ainsbury
- Robert Brown as Saul
- Juliet Harmer as Jill Manson
- Walter Horsbrugh as School Inspector

== Production ==
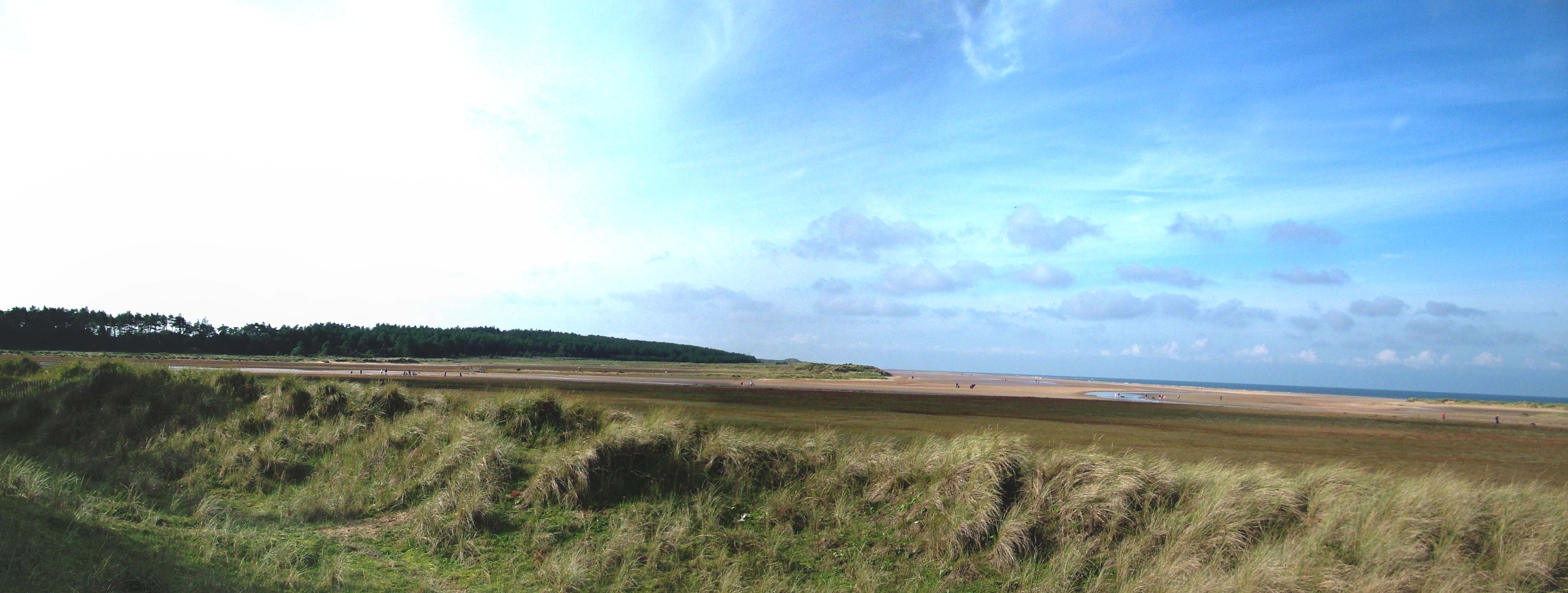
The beach scenes were shot on the dunes at Holkham in late July 1965

The episode was originally shot between 29 October to 13 November 1964 with Elizabeth Shepherd.

However, the producers decided that she was not right for the role and replaced her with Diana Rigg. The episode was re-shot sometime between 21 July and 30 July 1965 part way through the season. The village scenes were shot in Wighton, the shoreline scenes were shot at Holkham Gap, and the airfield scenes were shot at then disused RAF Sculthorpe (which had, for some time prior, been a USAF base), near Fakenham, in Norfolk. The sets were designed by Harry Pottle. The episode was first broadcast ABC on 28 September 1965.

== Reception ==
The episode was well-received; most striking in the oppressive and poignant atmosphere created by the derelict school and airfield abandoned since the war and the sheer decadence of the village depicted in it. In their book Reading Between Designs: Visual Imagery and the Generation of Meaning in The Avengers, The Prisoner, and Doctor Who, Piers D. Britton and Simon J. Barker stated:

Inebriated Gremlin, the village inn where Steed and Mrs. Peel stay, are manifestly created for emotional impact: as an environment, the pub is palpably hostile and almost viscerally nauseating. The lounge bar is thoroughly dilapidated and heavily cobwebbed, with a transistor radio perched on an old sofa cushion in lieu of the jukebox. Steed's bedroom is an even more powerful study in insalubrity. Chipped enamel basin, tarnished metal bedstead, tattered curtains and towels, a lumpy, ill-made bed, and a flypaper choked with its victims all proclaim the fact that visitors are not welcome. Pottle manipulated the very space of the set so as to ensure that it is unsettling: the strongly inclined coving of the ceiling creates an oppressive atmosphere, which resonates with Steed's discovery that the windows are boarded up on the outside.

They believe that the underlying theme of the episode is a "near-the-bone expose of parochial insularity and xenophobia in rural Norfolk", and that Clemens intentionally laced the episode with black humour and clichés of a stereotypical rustic village with "inhospitable hostelry" and the "starkly silhouetted gothic church".

== In popular culture ==
A sequence of this episode (in which Steed arrives at Mrs. Peel's flat and then they practice fencing together while discussing their upcoming assignment) was included in the opening scene of the thirteenth episode of the second season of Outlander book series television adaptation, "Dragonfly in Amber."
