= 19th Golden Raspberry Awards =

Award ceremony presented by the Golden Raspberry Award Foundation in 1998

- Date: March 20, 1999
- Site: Huntley Hotel Garden Room, Santa Monica, California

Highlights
- Worst Picture: An Alan Smithee Film: Burn Hollywood Burn
- Most awards: An Alan Smithee Film: Burn Hollywood Burn (5)
- Most nominations: An Alan Smithee Film: Burn Hollywood Burn and The Avengers (both 9)

The 19th Golden Raspberry Awards were held on March 20, 1999, at the Huntley Hotel Garden Room in Santa Monica, California, to recognize the worst the movie industry had to offer in 1998.

== Awards and nominations ==
Winner (in bold)
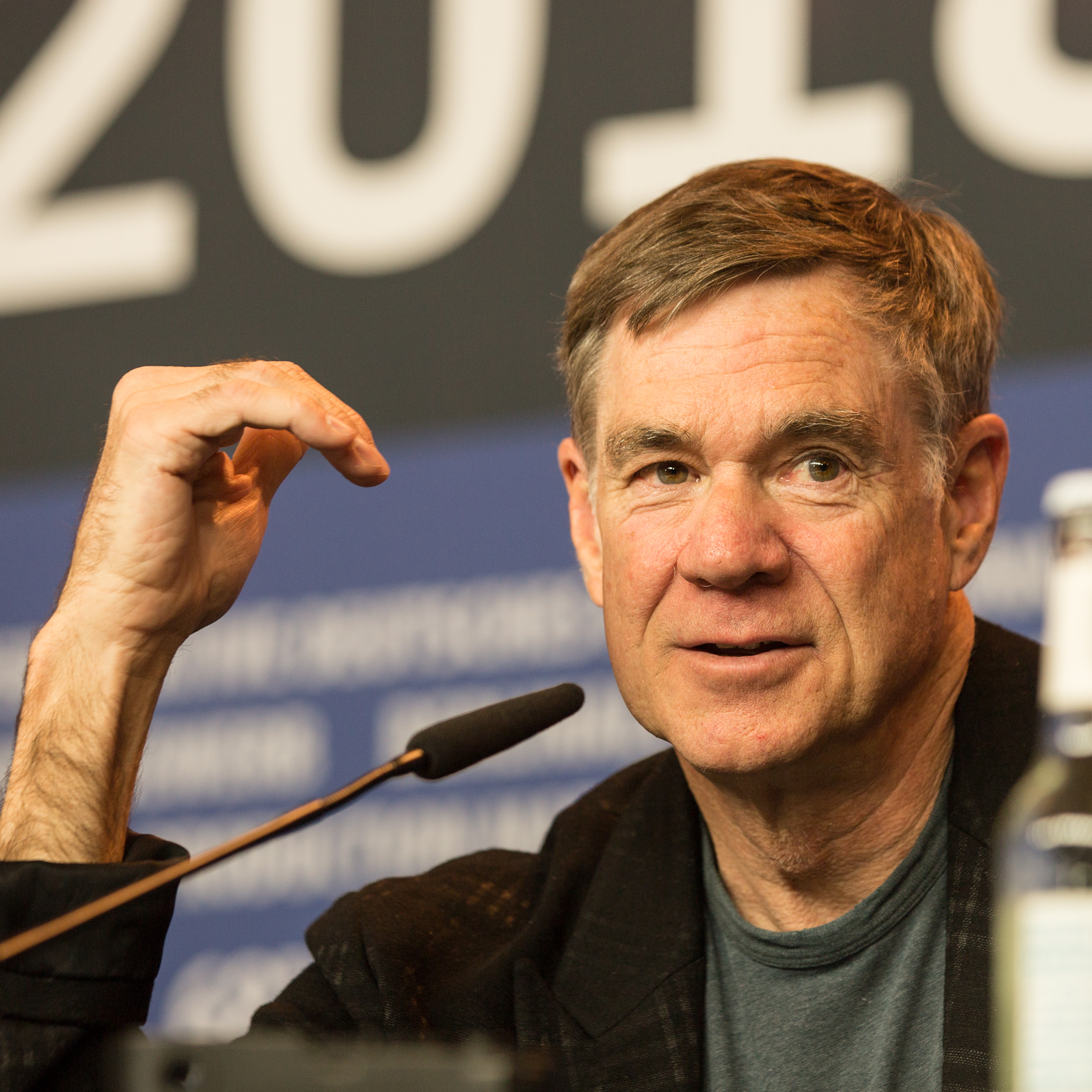
Gus Van Sant, Worst Director winner.

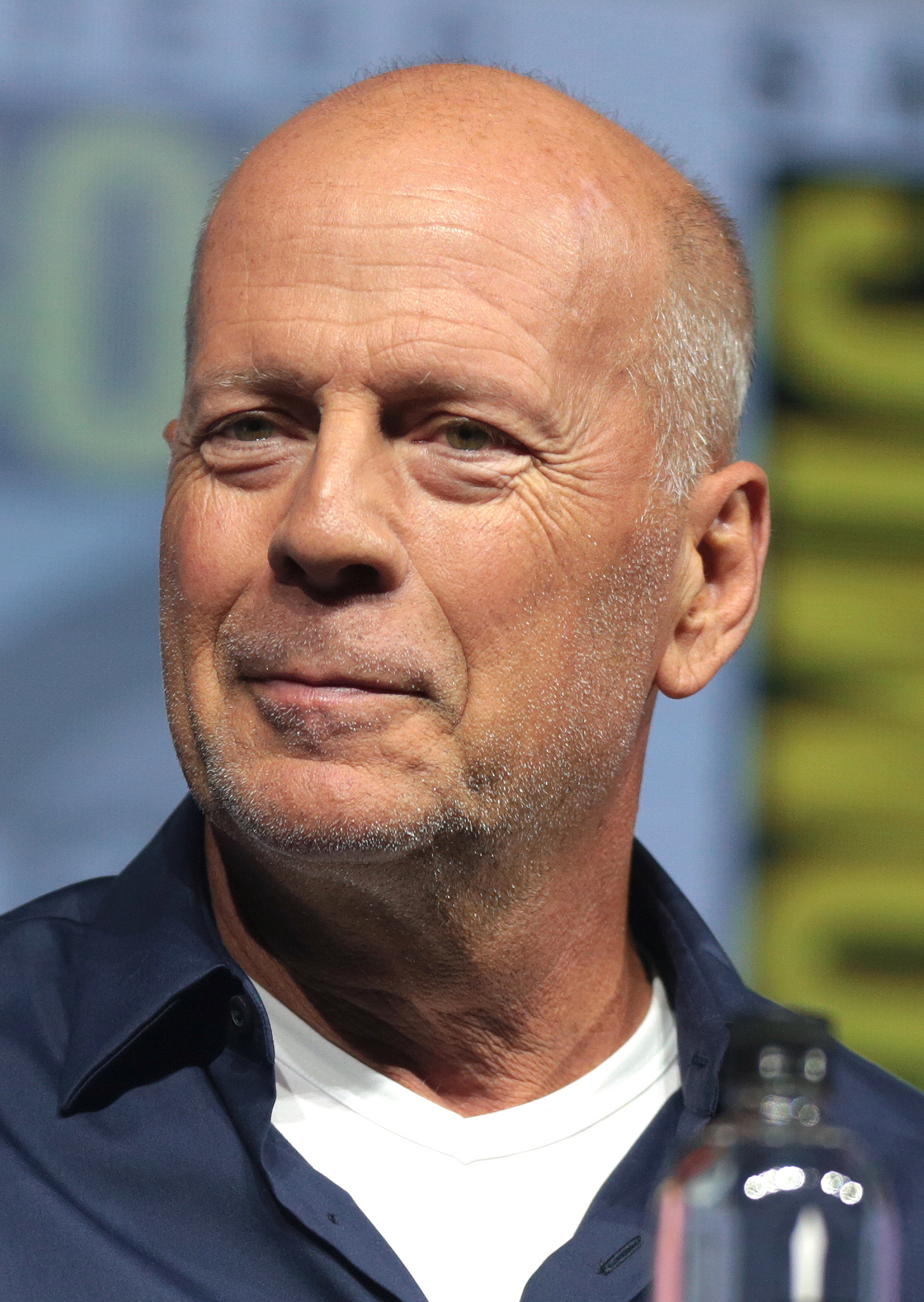
Bruce Willis, Worst Actor winner.

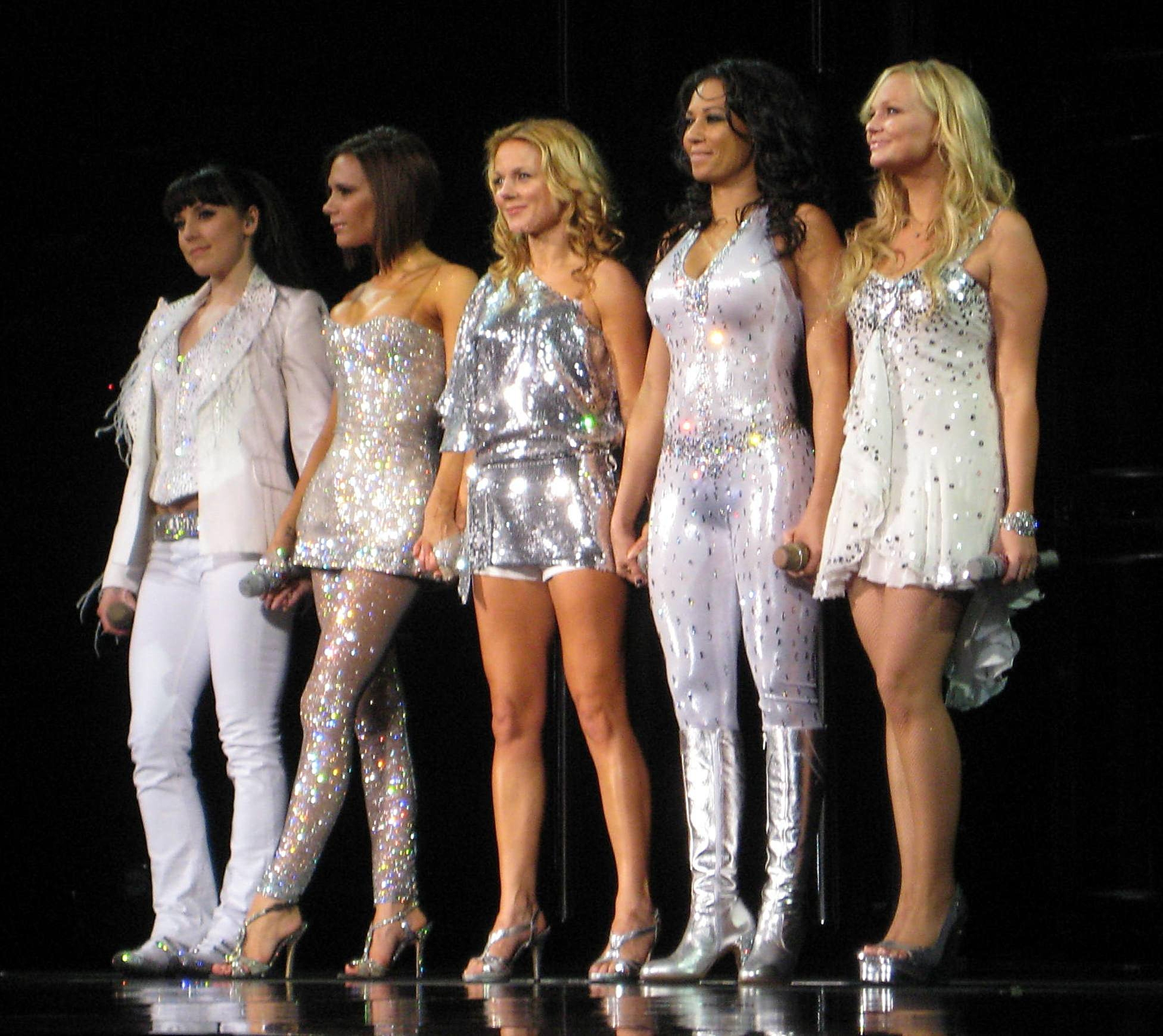
Spice Girls, Worst Actress winners.

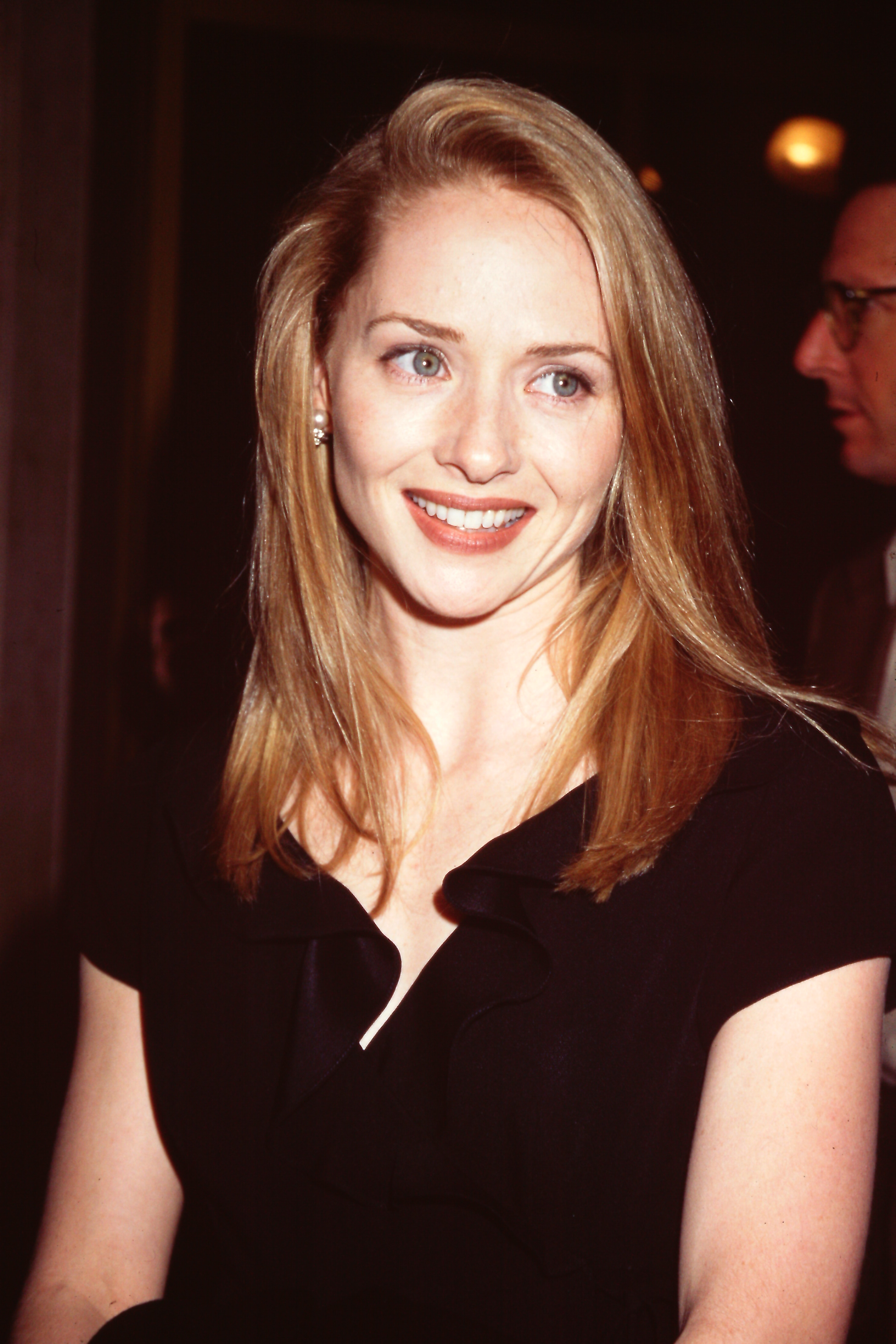
Maria Pitillo, Worst Supporting Actress winner.

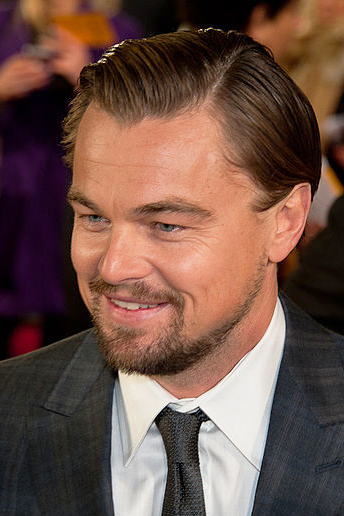
Leonardo DiCaprio, Worst Screen Couple winner.

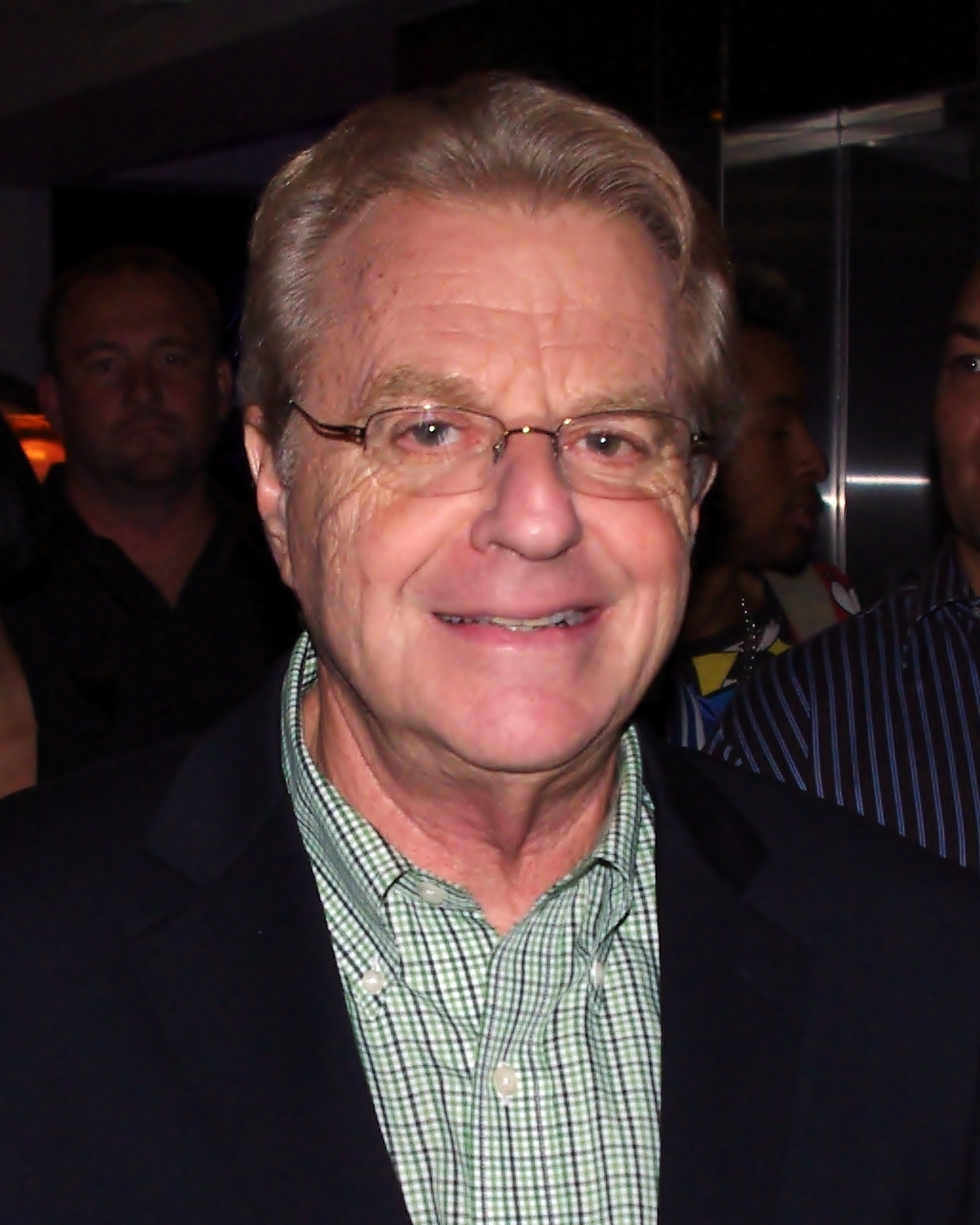
Jerry Springer, Worst New Star co-winner.

Category	Recipient
Worst Picture	**An Alan Smithee Film: Burn Hollywood Burn (Hollywood Pictures)**
Worst Picture	Armageddon (Touchstone)
Worst Picture	The Avengers (Warner Bros.)
Worst Picture	Godzilla (TriStar)
Worst Picture	Spice World (Columbia)
Worst Actor	**Bruce Willis in Armageddon, Mercury Rising, and The Siege as Harry Stamper, Art Jeffries and William Devereaux (respectively)**
Worst Actor	Ralph Fiennes in The Avengers as John Steed
Worst Actor	Ryan O'Neal in An Alan Smithee Film: Burn Hollywood Burn as James Edmunds
Worst Actor	Ryan Phillippe in 54 as Shane O'Shea
Worst Actor	Adam Sandler in The Waterboy as Bobby Boucher
Worst Actress	**The Spice Girls in Spice World as themselves**
Worst Actress	Yasmine Bleeth in BASEketball as Jenna Reed
Worst Actress	Anne Heche in Psycho as Marion Crane
Worst Actress	Jessica Lange in Hush as Martha Baring
Worst Actress	Uma Thurman in The Avengers as Emma Peel
Worst Supporting Actor	**Joe Eszterhas (as himself) in An Alan Smithee Film: Burn Hollywood Burn**
Worst Supporting Actor	Sean Connery in The Avengers as Sir August de Wynter
Worst Supporting Actor	Roger Moore in Spice World as The Chief
Worst Supporting Actor	Joe Pesci in Lethal Weapon 4 as Leo Getz
Worst Supporting Actor	Sylvester Stallone (as himself) in An Alan Smithee Film: Burn Hollywood Burn
Worst Supporting Actress	**Maria Pitillo in Godzilla as Audrey Timmonds**
Worst Supporting Actress	Ellen Albertini Dow in 54 as Disco Dottie
Worst Supporting Actress	Jenny McCarthy in BASEketball as Yvette Denslow
Worst Supporting Actress	Liv Tyler in Armageddon as Grace Stamper
Worst Supporting Actress	Raquel Welch in Chairman of the Board as Grace Kosik
Worst Screen Couple	**Leonardo DiCaprio and Leonardo DiCaprio (as twins) in The Man in the Iron Mask**
Worst Screen Couple	Ben Affleck and Liv Tyler in Armageddon
Worst Screen Couple	"Any combination of two characters, body parts or fashion accessories" in Spice World
Worst Screen Couple	"Any combination of two people playing themselves (or playing with themselves)" in An Alan Smithee Film: Burn Hollywood Burn
Worst Screen Couple	Ralph Fiennes and Uma Thurman in The Avengers
Worst Remake or Sequel	**The Avengers (Warner Bros.) (tie)**
Worst Remake or Sequel	**Godzilla (TriStar) (tie)**
Worst Remake or Sequel	**Psycho (Universal) (tie)** (The only three-way tie in the awards' history.)
Worst Remake or Sequel	Lost in Space (New Line Cinema)
Worst Remake or Sequel	Meet Joe Black (Universal) (remake of Death Takes a Holiday)
Worst Director	**Gus Van Sant for Psycho**
Worst Director	Michael Bay for Armageddon
Worst Director	Jeremiah S. Chechik for The Avengers
Worst Director	Roland Emmerich for Godzilla
Worst Director	Alan Smithee (also known as Arthur Hiller) for An Alan Smithee Film: Burn Hollywood Burn
Worst Screenplay	**An Alan Smithee Film: Burn Hollywood Burn, written by Joe Eszterhas**
Worst Screenplay	Armageddon, screenplay by Jonathan Hensleigh and J. J. Abrams, story by Robert Roy Pool and Jonathan Hensleigh, adaptation by Tony Gilroy and Shane Salerno
Worst Screenplay	The Avengers, written by Don MacPherson, based on the television series created by Sydney Newman
Worst Screenplay	Godzilla, screenplay by Dean Devlin and Roland Emmerich, story by Roland Emmerich, Dean Devlin, Ted Elliott & Terry Rossio
Worst Screenplay	Spice World, written by Kim Fuller, idea by Fuller and the Spice Girls
Worst New Star	**Joe Eszterhas (as himself) in An Alan Smithee Film: Burn Hollywood Burn (tie)**
Worst New Star	**Jerry Springer in Ringmaster as Jerry Farrelly (tie)**
Worst New Star	Barney in Barney's Great Adventure: The Movie as himself
Worst New Star	Carrot Top in Chairman of the Board as Edison
Worst New Star	The Spice Girls in Spice World as themselves
Worst Original Song	**"I Wanna Be Mike Ovitz!" from An Alan Smithee Film: Burn Hollywood Burn, written by Joe Eszterhas and Gary G-Wiz**
Worst Original Song	"Barney, the Song" from Barney's Great Adventure: The Movie, written by Jerry Herman
Worst Original Song	"I Don't Want to Miss a Thing" from Armageddon, written by Diane Warren (also Oscar-nominated)
Worst Original Song	"Storm" from The Avengers, written by Bruce Woolley, Chris Elliott, Marius deVries, Betsy Cook, and Andy Caine
Worst Original Song	"Too Much" from Spice World, written by the Spice Girls, Andy Watkins, and Paul Wilson
Worst Movie Trends of the Year	**"Gidgets 'n' geezers (58-year-old leading men wooing 28-year-old leading ladies)"** (referring to the likes of A Perfect Murder, Six Days, Seven Nights and Stepmom)
Worst Movie Trends of the Year	"If you've seen the trailer, why bother to see the movie?!? (previews that give away the film's entire plot)"
Worst Movie Trends of the Year	"30 minutes of story – conveyed in less than three hours! (l-o-n-g-e-r movies... shorter plots)"
Worst Movie Trends of the Year	"THX: The audio is deafening! (movie sound so loud it constitutes assault with a deafening weapon)"
Worst Movie Trends of the Year	"Yo quiero tacky tie-ins! (Mega-zillion-dollar cross-promotional overkill: Armageddon, Godzilla, etc.)"

== Films with multiple nominations ==
These films received multiple nominations:

Nominations	Films
9	An Alan Smithee Film: Burn Hollywood Burn
9	The Avengers
8	Armageddon
7	Spice World
6	Godzilla
3	Psycho
2	Barney's Great Adventure: The Movie
2	BASEketball
2	Chairman of the Board
2	54

== See also ==
- 1998 in film
- 71st Academy Awards
- 52nd British Academy Film Awards
- 56th Golden Globe Awards
- 5th Screen Actors Guild Awards
