= Mother (The Avengers) =

Fictional character in the Avengers television series

- The Avengers character
- Newell as Mother
- First appearance: "The Forget-Me-Knot" (1968)
- Last appearance: "Bizarre"
- Portrayed by: Patrick Newell (TV); Jim Broadbent (film); Christopher Benjamin (audio)

In-universe information
- Gender: Male
- Nationality: British

"Mother" is a fictional character in British TV series The Avengers.

== Overview ==
"Mother" is a codename. In the series the incumbent in the role is a disabled male British government official (played by Patrick Newell) who uses a wheelchair. He makes his debut in "The Forget-Me-Knot", which is Emma Peel's final episode and Tara King's first. In subsequent episodes he gives orders to John Steed and Tara King.

Prior to Mother's debut appearance, during the Emma Peel era Steed's superior was never identified. However, during the Cathy Gale era, Steed was occasionally seen taking his orders from an individual referred to by the code-name "One-Ten", played by Douglas Muir in five episodes. This character was succeeded by another superior named "Charles" (played in two episodes by Paul Whitsun-Jones), then in one episode by Ronald Radd as "Quilpie". Charles and especially Quilpie were clearly early prototypes for the "Mother" character, sharing several of Mother's mannerisms (though not the wheelchair).

Mother appears in most episodes of series six, the last season of the series. He is an irascible yet highly intelligent character, and is a great admirer of Steed and especially his wine cellar. He has two elderly aunts whom, in the episode "Homicide and Old Lace", he entertains with stories of his department's cases.

Patrick Newell had played various characters in previous episodes of The Avengers, most recently Sir George Collins, a sometime Minister of the Crown and close relative of the Attorney General, in season five's "Something Nasty in the Nursery".

== Bases and locations ==
In spite of his disability Mother seems mobile, continuously moving his location from more easily believable sites such as a stately home to eccentric ones such as a double-decker bus or under water. He has a new base in practically every episode. The plots of several episodes involve attempts to assassinate him, so these moves are presumably a security measure. The episode "False Witness", in which the double-decker office is featured, also implies that Mother is capable of some degree of mobility without a wheelchair, as he is seen holding a cane.

== Associates ==
The humour of "Mother" as a codename for a man is emphasized by having a blind female official called "Father" as the second to Mother in rank. Father appears in one episode of the series ("Stay Tuned") and in the 1998 film.

In another episode of the series, "Take Me To Your Leader", Mother refers to an associate named "Grandma".

Mother's assistant is Rhonda, a tall blonde woman who never speaks. Mother comments on this in one episode ("Noon Doomsday"), saying that her quietness was lovely. When she tries to respond he stops her, instructing her not to spoil it. In "Homicide and Old Lace" Rhonda appears to speak, but this is revealed to be an act of ventriloquism on Mother's part. At the end of one episode she dispatches several villains in hand-to-hand combat. Rhonda was played by Australian model-actress Rhonda Parker (b. 1947), about whom little else is known; Parker subsequently appeared briefly in the 1970 John Cassavetes film Husbands.

== Reception ==
In the British Film Institute's 1996 tribute book, The Avengers, Toby Miller writes: "The nicest deviation from classic detective fiction comes in the depthlessness of The Avengers: rather than seeking motivation through temporary occupancy of the criminal mind or a reconstruction of its psychic imbalances, perversities are simply dealt with when encountered. Nor does the team persuade a court of law or any organization that the truth has been established: they have executive power. When Miss King appears as Steed's fellow professional, and they work for a fully achieved administrative character in Mother, the series loses this concrete ambiguity that had so beautifully expressed the everydayness of governmentality. Mother had been designated as a cameo in 'The Forget-Me-Knot', but audience reaction was so powerful in the USA that he was written into the remainder of the series."

In Quite Quite Fantastic! The Avengers for Modern Viewers, Michael Scott Phillips also had a negative view: "Patrick Newell does a fine job but the character himself was to be mostly a pompous windbag that would only occasionally demonstrate charisma throughout the remainder of the series. As the future would show for the most part, the direction his new role indicated would fail; there was no need to turn backwards in the direction of his predecessors... This was supposedly encouraged by American executives at ABC who liked Mother. Bluntly, the show didn't need it."

== In other media ==
In Alan Moore and Kevin O'Neill's The League of Extraordinary Gentlemen: Black Dossier, Harry Lime is in command of the British Secret Service acting as M but is nicknamed "Mother" by several agents, including Emma Peel.

In the Tom Stoppard play Hapgood the (female) senior secret agent Hapgood also has the nickname or codename 'Mother'.

Although Mother did not appear on television until the final Emma Peel story (and had never previously been referenced), some Avengers spin-off material (novels, comic strips, comic books) retroactively had Steed and Peel receiving orders from Mother.

Mother appeared in the 1998 film adaptation, played by Jim Broadbent.

The character is voiced by Christopher Benjamin in the audio dramas produced by Big Finish Productions.
