= The Avengers (1998 film) =

1998 film by Jeremiah S. Chechik

- Theatrical release poster
- Directed by: Jeremiah S. Chechik
- Written by: Don Macpherson
- Based on: The Avengers by Sydney Newman
- Produced by: Jerry Weintraub
- Starring: Ralph Fiennes; Uma Thurman; Sean Connery; Jim Broadbent
- Cinematography: Roger Pratt
- Edited by: Mick Audsley
- Music by: Joel McNeely
- Production company: JW Productions
- Distributed by: Warner Bros.
- Release date: August 14, 1998
- Running time: 89 minutes
- Country: United States
- Language: English
- Budget: $60 million
- Box office: $54.7 million

The Avengers is a 1998 American spy film directed by Jeremiah Chechik, an adaptation of the 1961–1969 British television series of the same name. It stars Ralph Fiennes and Uma Thurman as secret agents John Steed and Emma Peel, and Sean Connery as Sir August de Wynter, a mad scientist bent on controlling the world's weather. Patrick Macnee, Steed in the original series, makes a vocal cameo as the voice of Invisible Jones.

The Avengers was released by Warner Bros. on August 14, 1998. The film underperformed at the box-office, only grossing $54.7 million against its $60 million budget, and was met with overwhelmingly negative reviews from critics.

== Plot ==
Secret agent John Steed and meteorologist Dr. Emma Peel are summoned to The Ministry. They meet the spymaster, codenamed Mother, who informs them that the Prospero project — an attempt to influence the weather — was apparently sabotaged by Peel. Dr. Peel claims she is innocent, and she is sent to work alongside Steed to find the real culprit. Mother's second-in-command, Father, claims that Peel has dissociative identity disorder. The duo visits Sir August de Wynter, a former Ministry scientist. He takes an instant liking to Peel, as they both share a love of weather.

Steed and Peel follow a lead to Wonderland Weather, a business that artificially creates heat or rain with a special machine, where they discover two dead men in teddy bear suits. The members of a secret organization, led by de Wynter, all don different coloured teddy bear suits to disguise their identities. One of them, however, looks exactly like Peel. Steed arrives in time to save Peel, as the double jumps off a roof and disappears.

Steed and Peel go off to visit de Wynter at his mansion but are attacked by mechanical bees. An elderly Ministry agent, Alice, helps them to flee; nevertheless, de Wynter captures, drugs and hypnotises Peel while she's in a barely coherent state. When de Wynter is later distracted, Peel tries to escape but feels faint and finds herself trapped due to the mansion's ever-changing floor plan. Becoming desperate, she smashes her way through a mirror/window where Steed then finds her unconscious and rescues her. Back at Steed's apartment, Peel wakes up and is given a pair of Trubshaw boots however, Peel is arrested by Father, while Steed visits Invisible Jones, a man inside The Ministry, to investigate the meaning of a map found at Wonderland Weather.

After viewing photos of failed genetic experiments including cloning (revealing that the other Emma Peel is a clone), Steed determines Father is working alongside de Wynter. Father and the Peel clone gas Peel unconscious but are confronted by Mother, whom they incapacitate. De Wynter, controlling the weather using Prospero, confronts the world leaders, boasting that he controls the weather and they will have to buy the weather from him at great expense. He gives them a midnight ultimatum.

Father and the clone take Peel to a hot air balloon, where she regains consciousness and escapes during a snowstorm. Father and the clone perish when the balloon collides with the Wonderland Weather sign. Once reunited, Steed and Peel share a kiss. Jones determines de Wynter is using the Prospero instruments on a secret island, and Peel and Steed travel there to stop him. Peel defuses the Prospero device just as a hurricane forms over London. Steed duels de Wynter and impales him with his own cane, causing de Wynter to be disintegrated by a powerful bolt of lightning. The duo escapes just as the base self-destructs, and rendezvous with Mother on the roof of a building.

== Cast ==
- Ralph Fiennes as John Steed, a British Ministry agent
- Uma Thurman as Emma Peel, Scientist, Ministry agent
- Sean Connery as Sir August de Wynter, a weather scientist and a terrorist
- Jim Broadbent as Mother, Director of the Ministry
- Fiona Shaw as Father, deputy director of the Ministry
- Eddie Izzard as Bailey, Sir August's henchman
- Eileen Atkins as Alice, a Ministry Agent
- Carmen Ejogo as Brenda, a Ministry Agent, Mother's aide
- John Wood as Trubshaw, Steed's tailor
- Keeley Hawes as Tamara, Agent of Sir August
- Patrick Macnee (voice) as Invisible Jones, a Ministry Agent

== Production ==
Producer Jerry Weintraub had acquired the entirety of the Thorn EMI library including The Avengers in the mid 1980s. Weintraub subsequently sold most of the Thorn EMI properties such as Thunderbirds, The Prisoner, and The Persuaders! to PolyGram but held onto The Avengers as he felt it had potential. Don Macpherson's screenplay took inspiration from William Shakespeare's The Tempest for the weather machine based plot. Weintraub had commissioned several scripts for the film but it was only upon receiving Macpherson's script that Weintraub felt it was the one to translate the feel of the TV series with a compelling story. Patrick Macnee who played John Steed in the original series has a cameo as Invisible Jones. Mel Gibson had been an early choice to play Steed in the film as he had a contract with Weintraub, but director Jeremiah S. Chechik was instrumental in getting Ralph Fiennes the role as they had been wanting to work together with Fiennes accepting the role while filming The English Patient. Before Uma Thurman had been cast as Emma Peel, Emma Thompson and Nicole Kidman were both considered for the role. Diana Rigg had been offered a role in the film, but turned down the project as she felt it would invite unfair comparisons to Thurman's take on the role.

== Release ==
Warner Bros., the film's distributor, refused to allow any early press screenings for movie reviewers. Such a decision is often made when a studio and/or distributor knows a film will not be received well and pre-release reviews would only be negative. The film was originally scheduled to open earlier in June 1998, but was pushed back until August, often referred to as the "dumping ground" for films that are not felt to be strong enough to open on the more lucrative holiday weekends in early summer. Mick LaSalle of the San Francisco Chronicle wrote:

There's...some business involving a dead ringer for Emma going around causing trouble, and there's some mention of the word "cloning". Then all talk of that is dropped. Everything is dropped. After a slow opening, the 90-minute movie jolts into climax mode. What happened to the middle? Clearly, this wasn't just edited but gutted. No doubt they did us all a favor, but it doesn't help. Instead of just being a bad picture, the missing middle makes The Avengers a bad and weird and strangely off picture. One example: There's never a moment when Emma and Steed realize who the villain is. At first, they don't know. Next, they're in a titanic battle to the death. At one point, Emma is shackled and floating around in a hot-air balloon. I don't know how she got there. I must have blinked.

Due to internal wrangling at Warner Bros., the decision was made to vastly cut down the running time after test screenings, reducing the 115-minute film to 89 minutes, sacrificing much coherence and continuity in the process. Key scenes removed included the opening sequence in which Mrs. Peel's evil clone infiltrates and destroys the Prospero science installation; early trailers included the scene where she says the words "How now brown cow" in a false telephone box to gain admittance; these words are later used in the film when Steed and Peel use them to enter de Wynter's island fortress in another telephone box. The movie was originally scored by composer Michael Kamen, who included the original Avengers theme; however, he was unable to re-score the film after the radical editing, so was forced to drop out. The recut version of the film was scored by Joel McNeely. The original cut has yet to surface; Warner Bros. has no plans to release a director's cut or special edition in any form, despite the fact that director Jeremiah Chechik has offered to recut the film for free.

The rock band Radiohead recorded a version of their song "Man of War" for the Avengers soundtrack but abandoned it after a failed studio session.

== Reception ==
=== Box office ===
The Avengers ranked third in its opening weekend behind Saving Private Ryan and How Stella Got Her Groove Back, with $10,305,957. The film ultimately grossed $23,384,939 in the United States and Canada and $31.3 million internationally for a worldwide total of $54.7 million. (The-Numbers.com reported a lower international gross of $25.2 million.) With a $60 million budget, it was a box office flop.

=== Critical response ===
On the review aggregator website Rotten Tomatoes, 5% of 83 critics' reviews are positive, with an average rating of 3.2/10. The website's consensus reads: "A TV spinoff that lacks enough energy to spin, The Avengers is an ineptly written, woefully miscast disaster." Metacritic, which uses a weighted average, assigned the film a score of 12 out of 100, based on 19 critics, indicating "overwhelming dislike". Audiences polled by CinemaScore gave the film an average grade of D on an A+ to F scale.

Fans disliked the film for its disrespect to the series (particularly the introduction of a romance between Steed and Peel — previously a carefully ambiguous subject). Newcomers were lost by all of the misfired attempts to capture the mood of the original. Rod Dreher in the New York Post called the film "a big fat gob of maximum crapulosity, the kind of shallow, stupid, big-budget cow pile that smells of Joel Schumacher", referring to the previous summer's likewise poorly received Batman & Robin, also starring Thurman. David Bianculli stated: "This Avengers film is so horrendously, painfully, and thoroughly awful that it gives other cinematic clunkers like Ishtar and Howard the Duck a good name." Jay Boyer in the Orlando Sentinel said "The Avengers is, without a doubt, the worst movie of the summer". Reception in Britain was equally hostile. The Birmingham Post wrote "The Avengers is being slated by critics as the worst film ever made - such a turkey, says one, that the makers should have handed distribution to (mass turkey producer) Bernard Matthews". Alan Jones in The Radio Times said "the cult 1960s TV series gets royally shafted by Hollywood in this stunningly designed blockbuster that's stunningly awful in every other department... Terrible special effects and zero chemistry between Fiennes and Thurman make this notorious disaster a total waste of everyone's time and energy".

Several critics noted that despite the film being written by Englishman Don Macpherson, the American production team fatally misunderstood the symbols of "Britishness" central to The Avengers series, such as the inclusion of an inexplicable gadget on the dashboard of Steed's Bentley, which appeared to dispense tea, with milk already added.

Commenting on the truncated released cut, The New York Times's Janet Maslin noted: "At a pared-down, barely rational 90 minutes, The Avengers is short but not short enough". In 2003, Total Film magazine voted Fiennes and Thurman in The Avengers as "The Worst Movie Double Act Of All Time".

=== Accolades ===
The Avengers was nominated for nine Razzies at the 19th Golden Raspberry Awards: Picture, Director, Screenplay, Supporting Actor (Connery), Actress (Thurman), Actor (Fiennes), Screen Couple (Fiennes and Thurman) and Original Song ("Storm"), winning only one for Worst Remake or Sequel.

Awards	Category	Nominee	Result	Ref.
Razzie Award	Worst Picture	The Avengers	Nominated	
Razzie Award	Worst Director	Jeremiah Chechik	Nominated	
Razzie Award	Worst Screenplay	Don Macpherson	Nominated	
Razzie Award	Worst Actor	Ralph Fiennes	Nominated	
Razzie Award	Worst Actress	Uma Thurman	Nominated	
Razzie Award	Worst Supporting Actor	Sean Connery	Nominated	
Razzie Award	Worst Screen Couple	Ralph Fiennes and Uma Thurman	Nominated	
Razzie Award	Worst Original Song	"Storm" by Grace Jones	Nominated	
Razzie Award	Worst Remake or Sequel	The Avengers	Won	
Stinker Award	Worst Picture	The Avengers	Nominated	
Stinker Award	Worst Director	Jeremiah Chechik	Nominated	
Stinker Award	Worst Actor	Ralph Fiennes	Nominated	
Stinker Award	Worst Actress	Uma Thurman	Nominated	
Stinker Award	Worst Supporting Actor	Sean Connery	Nominated	
Stinker Award	Worst On-Screen Couple	Ralph Fiennes and Uma Thurman	Nominated	
Stinker Award	Most Annoying Fake Accent	Uma Thurman	Nominated	
Stinker Award	Worst Resurrection of a TV Show	The Avengers	Won	

== Novelization ==
The film's original script was used for its novelization (written by Julie Kaewert) and included all the material which was first shot and then removed from the film.

== See also ==
- List of 20th century films considered the worst
