= Emma Peel =

Character in the television series The Avengers

- The Avengers character
- Diana Rigg as Mrs. Emma Peel
- First appearance: "The Town of No Return" (1965)
- Last appearance: "The Forget-Me-Knot" (1968)
- Portrayed by: Diana Rigg (TV); Uma Thurman (1998 film); Olivia Poulet (audio)
- Voiced by: Diane Appleby (1971–1973); Sue Lloyd (1977)

In-universe information
- Gender: Female
- Occupation: Unofficial undercover operative
- Spouse: Peter Peel
- Relatives: Sir John Knight (father)
- Nationality: British

Emma Peel is a fictional character played by Diana Rigg in the British 1960s television series The Avengers, and by Uma Thurman in the 1998 film version. The name "Emma Peel" is a play on the phrase "M Appeal", short for "man appeal", one of the required elements of the character. She is the crime-fighting partner of John Steed. As a female spy adventurer and expert in martial arts, she became a feminist icon. She was a 1960s fashion icon and sex symbol.

== Portrayals ==
The character Mrs Peel was introduced in the fourth season of The Avengers as a replacement for Cathy Gale. Actress Elizabeth Shepherd was initially cast as Emma Peel, but after filming all of one episode and part of a second, the producers decided that Shepherd was not right for the part, and she was dismissed. No footage of Shepherd as Peel survives. The producers replaced her with Diana Rigg, and the episodes were re-filmed. The character became an overnight success as well as a sex symbol.

In a South African radio version of the TV series from 1971 to 1973, she was played by South African actress Diane Appleby.

=== The New Avengers ===
Emma Peel reappeared on The New Avengers in the episode "K is for Kill", using archive clips from the original series. She briefly speaks with Steed over the phone and mentions that her last name isn't Peel anymore; Steed replies, "You'll always be Mrs. Peel to me." Sue Lloyd provided her voice. It was the only time during the revival that such a crossover with the original series occurred.

=== The Avengers (1998) ===
The character was revived and reworked for the 1998 film The Avengers. Uma Thurman was cast in the role opposite Ralph Fiennes as Steed. Mrs Peel is a scientist working as part of a weather project. When the project is sabotaged by someone who appears to be her double, she is investigated by Ministry agent John Steed. Ultimately, they team up to find out the truth.

The film was a critical and box office failure, with the new incarnation of the characters panned. In 2003, Total Film magazine voted Fiennes and Thurman "The Worst Movie Double Act of All Time" for their performances as Steed and Peel.

== Character ==
Emma Peel was born Emma Knight, the daughter of an industrialist, Sir John Knight. Peel is a strong heroine; she is rarely defeated in fights and is capable of rescuing Steed if he is in trouble. She is a master of martial arts and a formidable fencer. When not fighting crime, she specialises in chemistry and other sciences. She is also often seen in episodes engaging in artistic hobbies, and had success in industry at the helm of the company of her late father, Sir John Knight.

Her husband, Peter Peel, was a pilot whose plane had disappeared over the Amazonian forest. When her husband, Peter Peel, surprisingly reappears at the end of "The Forget-Me-Knot", Emma leaves Steed and her spy career behind. In the distant shot in which he appears, Peter Peel looks suspiciously like Steed (and was in fact played by Patrick Macnee's stunt double, Peter Weston), and like Steed, he drives a two-door convertible Bentley, albeit a contemporary model. Emma meets her replacement, Tara King (played by Linda Thorson), who enters the building as she herself is leaving and tells her that Steed likes his tea stirred "anti-clockwise". Peel would be the last of the "talented amateurs" with whom John Steed was teamed, as her successor is a neophyte professional agent.

In real life, Diana Rigg left the series for a number of reasons, one of which was to accept a role in the James Bond film On Her Majesty's Secret Service.

Emma drove a convertible Lotus Elan, and took on many undercover roles, from nurse to nanny, or a women's magazine reporter trying to interview big business tycoons and rich playboys.

Peel's verbal interactions with Steed range from witty banter to thinly disguised innuendo. Regarding whether they had a sexual relationship, Patrick Macnee said he thought the characters went to bed on a very regular basis (just not in view of the camera). Rigg thought they were most likely engaging in an enjoyable extended flirtation that ultimately went nowhere. Writer/producer Brian Clemens said he wrote them with the idea that they had an affair before Emma's first appearance in the series, and they appear to already know each other very well when Emma is first introduced.

=== Fashion ===
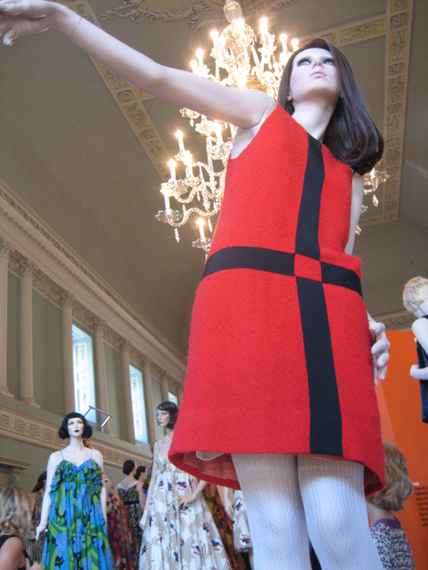
Miniskirt by John Bates, 1965

Her style of dress typified the period, and the character is still a fashion icon. At the start of her first season, Diana Rigg wore a leather catsuit similar to the previous heroine, Cathy Gale, but Rigg disliked the leather outfit. John Bates was brought in as the costume designer for Emma Peel, and he designed softer stretch jersey and PVC catsuits for her instead in the second half of the season. He created a wardrobe of black and white op-art mod clothing and miniskirts. Bates had to stop leaving hems on the mini skirts because the production team kept lowering them again. He also licensed his designs to several manufacturers under the Avengerswear label and these pieces were sold in various shops throughout the country.

When The Avengers transitioned from black and white to colour for its fifth season, the costume designer was Alun Hughes, who used bold colours and lurid, psychedelic patterns. Hughes also created the Emmapeeler catsuit, which was made of stretch jersey in bright block colours. The Emmapeelers and several other pieces from this season's wardrobe were licensed and sold in women's fashion shops.

== References and characters based on Emma Peel ==
=== German short films ===
Diana Rigg played a character extremely similar to Emma Peel in German short films produced for the 8mm home projector market, The Diadem from 1966 and Minikillers from 1969. Little behind the scenes information has surfaced, though the films themselves have survived.

=== Comics ===
The Growing Up of Emma Peel comic strip appeared in June and Schoolfriend comic from issue #52, dated 29 January 1966, to issue #63, dated 16 April 1966. This featured the adventures of 14-year-old Emma Knight, and was run concurrent with the TV Comic strip and consisted of 11 instalments.

Chris Claremont and John Byrne's 1980 rendition, in Marvel Comics' X-Men, of Jean Grey as the Black Queen of the Hellfire Club was inspired by Emma Peel in the 1966 Avengers episode "A Touch of Brimstone". In the story arc of Uncanny X-Men #132–134, the outfit Jean Grey wears as the Hellfire Club's Black Queen is also highly similar to the costume.

In 1991’s Doctor Who Monthly #173, Gary Russell and artists Mike Collins and Steve Pini show Captain Britain about to hit John Steed when Emma Peel shows up behind him.

Emma Peel and John Steed were spotted in the crowd in Kingdom Come #2 (1996) by Mark Waid and Alex Ross, where they are both in a bar scene.

A parody of Emma Peel appears in Alan Moore's comic The League of Extraordinary Gentlemen: Black Dossier as "Emma Night", daughter of industrialist Sir John Night, where she shares a mutual attraction with "Jimmy", of whom her paternal "Uncle Hugo" disapproves.

The late 1960s revamping of Wonder Woman by Mike Sekowsky as a mod-dressing, karate-chopping but non-superpowered feminist icon was directly modeled on Mrs Peel.

=== Music ===
The music video for the Pretenders' 1986 single "Don't Get Me Wrong" is a tribute to The Avengers and inserts lead singer Chrissie Hynde into the role of Emma Peel.

Emma Peel Sessions (1993) is Purple Avengers' second LP release.

The clip for "Emma Peel" from The Allies' debut album, Allies (1982), gave the band national recognition.

Pet Your Friends (1995), Dishwalla's debut, includes a song titled "Miss Emma Peel".

The French rock band Matmatah included a song called Emma about Emma Peel in their debut album La Ouache. She also appears at the end of the official clip for another song, Lambé an Dro.

=== TV ===
The British Spy Agent K in the Disney Channel cartoon The Replacements is based on Emma.

== References and sources ==
=== Sources ===
- Alvarez, Maria (14 August 1998). "Feminist icon in a catsuit". New Statesman.
- Cornell, Paul; Day, Martin; & Topping, Keith (1998). The Avengers Dossier. London: Virgin Books. ISBN 0-86369-754-2.
- Lars Baumgart (2002): DAS KONZEPT EMMA PEEL – Der unerwartete Charme der Emanzipation: THE AVENGERS und ihr Publikum. Kiel: Verlag Ludwig – ISBN 978-3-933598-40-0
- Stirling, Rachael (2026). All About My Mother: A Memoir of Diana Rigg. Hodder & Stoughton. ISBN 9781399820332.
- Tigges, Wim (15 February 2017). "A Woman Like You? Emma Peel, Xena: Warrior Princess, and the Empowerment of Female Heroes of the Silver Screen". The Journal of Popular Culture. 50 (1): 127–146. doi:10.1111/jpcu.12527. hdl:1887/68892.
