= Tara King =

Character from the TV series The Avengers

- The Avengers character
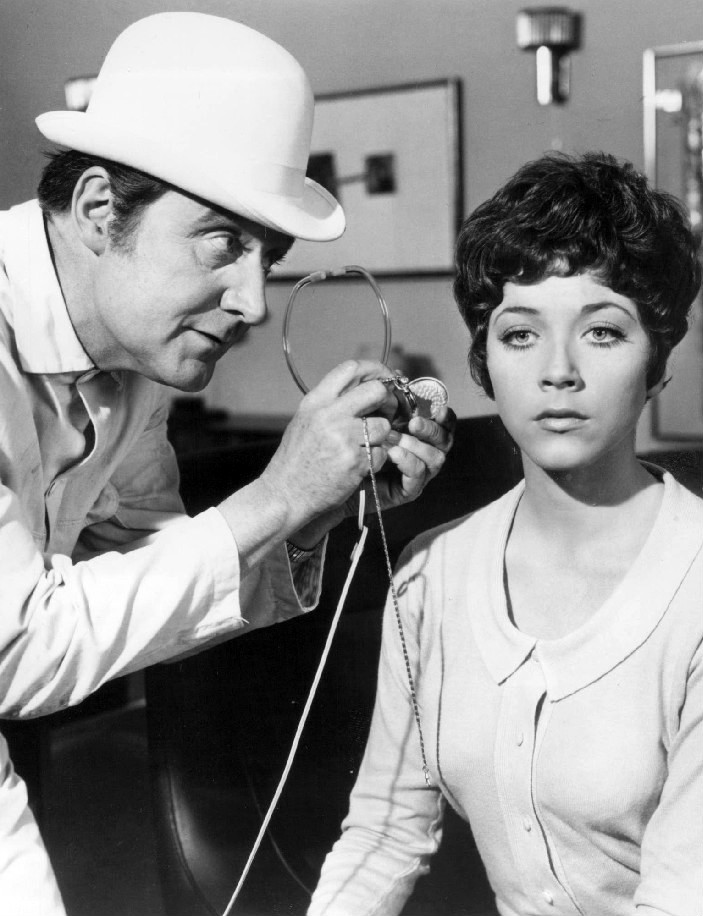
- Tara King (Linda Thorson) and John Steed (Patrick Macnee)
- First appearance: "The Forget-Me-Knot" (1968)
- Last appearance: "Bizarre"
- Portrayed by: Linda Thorson (TV); Emily Woodward (audio)

In-universe information
- Gender: Female
- Nationality: British

Tara King is a fictional character in the 1960s British adventure television series The Avengers, played by Canadian actress Linda Thorson. The sixth partner of agent John Steed (and fourth female partner), she appeared in series six (in colour) of the series (1968–1969), playing in 33 episodes. She is Emma Peel's successor. She is also the first of John Steed's partners to be a real spy. Viewers are not given any indication whether or not she is related to Dr. Martin King — played by Jon Rollason — one of Steed's partners from series 2.

== Character ==
=== Arrival ===
Unlike Steed's other partners, we know few things about her. She enlisted at an early age in the Intelligence Service as a trainee, under the number 69. Her first contact with the bowler-hatted agent is described in the first episode of season 6: "The Forget-Me-Knot". This was a rather spectacular meeting: thinking Steed is the "enemy" of her training, she pounces on him before she realises she has made a mistake. Shortly after, she makes Steed's acquaintance. During their talk, we learn John Steed is considered as an idol by all agents, Tara included. She then helps him to resolve the episode's investigation.

Episode ending: Emma Peel leaves Steed and her life as a "talented amateur" to go back to her husband, Peter Peel, who has been miraculously found in the Amazonian jungle, two years after his plane crashed. This means Steed needs a new partner: he phones his boss Mother, who "knows his tastes". Mother appoints Tara King to replace Emma. Tara comes to Steed's flat just in time to pass Mrs Peel on the stairs. Emma (whom she has never met before) gives her a piece of advice: how to stir Steed's tea (anticlockwise). This scene, where Emma passes the torch to Tara, is one of the best-known sequences of the series.

Tara arrives at Steed's flat and, although he is saddened by Emma's departure, he is delighted to see his new partner, greeting her with the words "Tara – Ra-boom-di-ay". The clear implication is that she will not only replace Mrs. Peel in Steed's professional career, but also in his personal life. For the remainder of the series, his relationship with her was more flirtatious and physical than with Mrs. Peel.

Just before he meets Tara, Steed looks out of his window to see Mrs Peel picked up by Peter Peel in his car. We only see Peter from behind, but he clearly has a Steed-like style and image, with dark suit, bowler hat and umbrella. Steed looks at the scene, appearing to be puzzled/intrigued.

== Characterisation ==
Dave Rogers writes in The Complete Avengers: The Full Story of Britain's Smash Crime-Fightin Team!: "Unlike Steed's earlier partners, Tara was single. 'It was my idea,' Linda told me. 'They suggested it might seem indecent for a single girl to be shown in his flat and perhaps having stayed overnight. I thought it was highly indecent for a married woman to be staying with him. So I persuaded them that it was much better for Tara to be single. Before my series, you had never really seen a girl making a fuss of Steed. But I saw Tara as being in love with him -- absolutely, unquestionably in love."

Tara was originally blonde but the shock of a grenade blast during 'The Great Great Britain Crime' subsequently turned her hair brunette. She states that she dislikes parties but loves skiing, motor sport, fashion and classical music and as a 2-year-old she went to Alaska. She normally carries a Smith & Wesson Model 40 Centennial 38 calibre revolver.

Tara continued the Lotus connection driving a red Lotus 54 in 8 episodes, and a Lotus 50 in 1. For ten episodes she drove an AC 428 initially meant to be Steed's car.

== Reception ==
In the British Film Institute's 1996 tribute book, The Avengers, Toby Miller writes: "After Thorson was selected to replace Rigg, the discourse on her tells us where the producers saw the programme going. Publicists suggested she was chosen because she looked like Shirley MacLaine, was five feet nine inches tall, 'and 38 inches elsewhere'... Thorson was said to want a decidedly sexual relationship between her character and Macnee's and was quoted as favouring topless bathing, not wearing brassières, and seeing her role as using 'sex appeal rather than force' to get what she wanted from men. To critics like Banks-Smith, swinging a handbag rather than fighting made her 'a far more probable woman' than her predecessors."

== In other media ==
Emily Woodward plays Tara in the audio adaptations of The Avengers produced by Big Finish Productions.
