= Patrick Newell =

English actor (1932–1988)

- Newell as Mother in The Avengers in 1968
- Born: Patrick David Newell; 27 March 1932; Hadleigh, Suffolk, England
- Died: 22 July 1988 (aged 56); Essex, England
- Occupation: Actor
- Years active: 1953–1988
- Spouse: Derina House (m. 1959)
- Children: 2

Patrick David Newell (27 March 1932 – 22 July 1988) was a British actor perhaps best known for playing Mother in The Avengers.

== Early life and education ==
The second son of Eric Llewellyn Newell, of High Lodge, Hadleigh, Suffolk, an Oxford-educated physician who served as a captain in the Royal Army Medical Corps, Newell was educated at Taunton School and completed his National Service, where a fellow recruit was Michael Caine, before training at the Royal Academy of Dramatic Art, alongside Albert Finney and Peter O'Toole.

== Career ==
Newell began to be seen frequently on TV, usually cast as a fat villain or in comic roles. Given his rotund appearance and ability for playing slightly stuffy types, he was a natural stooge in several comedy shows, first for Arthur Askey, in Arthur's Treasured Volumes (ATV, 1960), then for Jimmy Edwards in Faces of Jim (BBC, 1962), with Ronnie Barker also supporting.

He was originally cast as one of the inept recruits in the first of the Carry On films, 1958's Carry On Sergeant but, according to producer Peter Rogers, Newell turned up on the first day of filming, only to recognise the real-life sergeant hired to drill the cast as the one who'd made his life hell in the Army. He then, so Rogers claims, got into his Rolls-Royce, drove off and was never seen again.

In an interview with the TV Times in 1968, he claimed to have gained weight as a deliberate attempt to boost his career, marking him out for some niche roles. In Who's Who on Television in the late 1970s, Newell described himself as "Actor with a weight problem—the more he diets, the less work he seems to get."

His most notable role was as "Mother", the spymaster in The Avengers. He had previously appeared in two earlier Avengers episodes: "The Town of No Return" (Diana Rigg's debut) and, as a Minister of the Crown, in series five's "Something Nasty in the Nursery".

Other cult television appearances included roles in Maigret, The Persuaders!, Randall and Hopkirk (Deceased), the Doctor Who story "The Android Invasion", The Young Ones and Kinvig.

Newell played Inspector Lestrade in the 1980 TV series, Sherlock Holmes and Doctor Watson, made in Poland. He also turned up as a Playboy Bunny in one of the Benny Hill comedy specials. Film appearances include the Gluttony segment of The Magnificent Seven Deadly Sins (1971).

In 1984, he landed a more significant role, as Sutton/Blessington in ITV's well-received The Adventures of Sherlock Holmes production of "The Adventure of the Resident Patient", alongside Jeremy Brett.

== Death ==
Later in life Newell succeeded in losing a substantial amount of weight, but this did not prevent his early death from a heart attack. He was married and had two children.

== Selected filmography ==
=== Film ===
- Dial 999 (1955) – Brewers Man (uncredited)
- The Rebel (1961) – Art Gallery Patron (uncredited)
- Night Without Pity (1961) – Doctor
- Crooks Anonymous (1962) – 2nd Jeweller
- The Boys (1962) – Crowhurst
- The Dock Brief (1962) – 1st Warder
- Unearthly Stranger (1963) – Maj. Clarke
- Never Mention Murder (1964) (Edgar Wallace Mysteries) – Barman
- Father Came Too! (1964) – King Harold
- Becket (1964) – William of Corbeil (uncredited)
- Do You Know This Voice? (1964) – Neighbour
- Every Day's a Holiday (1964) – Mr. Hoskins
- The Alphabet Murders (1965) – Cracknell
- A Study in Terror (1965) – PC Benson
- Bindle (One of Them Days) (1966) – Mr. Hearty
- The Sandwich Man (1966) – River Bus Man
- The Long Duel (1967) – Colonel
- Danny the Dragon (1967) – Potter
- The Strange Affair (1968) – Victim
- The Magnificent Seven Deadly Sins (1971) – Doctor (segment "Gluttony")
- The Canterbury Tales (1972) – Prior (uncredited)
- Go for a Take (1972) – Generous Jim
- Where's Johnny? (1974) – Basil
- Vampira (1974) – Man in Hotel Room
- Man About the House (1974) – Sir Edmund Weir
- The Incredible Sarah (1976) – Major
- Stand Up, Virgin Soldiers (1977) – M. O. Billings
- The Golden Lady (1979) – Charlie Whitlock
- The Shillingbury Blowers (1980) – Mr. Meadows
- Young Sherlock Holmes (1985) – Bentley Bobster
- Redondela (1987) – José María Gil Ramos
- Consuming Passions (1988) – Lester (final film role)

=== Television ===
- Arthur's Treasured Volumes (1960) – Various characters
- Maigret
- Deadline Midnight (1961) – Bertie Miller
- Faces of Jim (1962) – Various characters
- Danger Man (1964) – Alex
- Thorndyke (1964) – Polton
- The Idiot (1966) – Lebediev
- The Illustrated Weekly Hudd (1966)
- Room at the Bottom (1967) – Cyril Culpepper
- All Gas and Gaiters (1967) - Ghost
- The Avengers (1968) – Mother (the spymaster) / Sir George Collins / Smallwood
- Randall and Hopkirk (Deceased) - The Man From Nowhere (1968) – Mannering
- Never Say Die (1970) – Mr. Oliphant
- The Misfit (1971) – Stanley Allenby-Johnson
- The Des O'Connor Show (1971)
- Casanova (1971) – Schalon
- The Persuaders!
- Sadie, It's Cold Outside (1975) – Chip shop proprietor
- Moll Flanders (1975) – Thomas Woodall
- Doctor Who: The Android Invasion – Part Four (1975) – Colonel Faraday
- Wilde Alliance ('A Question of Research ', 'A Game for Two Players', episodes) (1978) - Bailey
- Sherlock Holmes and Doctor Watson (unscreened) (1980) – Inspector Lestrade
- The Whizzkid's Guide (1981–1983)
- Doctors' Daughters (1981) – Archdeacon Bellwether
- Kinvig (1981) – Mr. Horsley
- Jemima Shore Investigates – Jamie
- Bottle Boys (1984) – Mr. Dawson
- Sherlock Holmes, "The Resident Patient" (1985) – Blessington/Sutton
- Ladies in Charge (1986) – Maxwell
- The Young Ones
- Benny Hill comedy special – Playboy Bunny
