= Albert Fennell =

British film and television producer (1920–1988)

Albert Fennell (29 March 1920 – 17 April 1988) was a British film and television producer who was born in Chiswick.

Fennell's film career began as a production designer and writer. His work as a film producer included Next to No Time, (1958), Peeping Tom (1960), The Innocents (1961) and This Sporting Life (1963).

He is best known for his work on the 1960s spy drama The Avengers beginning in its fourth season, for which he acted as a producer alongside writer Brian Clemens. Fennell also produced (with Clemens) its follow-up, The New Avengers and The Professionals. The New Avengers was made by The Avengers (Film and TV) Enterprises Ltd, and The Professionals was by Mark One Productions. both companies Fennell established with Clemens and composer Laurie Johnson.

His later film productions included And Soon the Darkness (1970), Dr. Jekyll and Sister Hyde (1971) and Captain Kronos – Vampire Hunter (1974).
