= The Avengers (TV series) =

British espionage television series (1961–1969)

- Patrick Macnee and Diana Rigg in the episode "The Hour That Never Was", first aired in 1965
- Genre: Action; Spy-fi; Comedy; Mystery
- Created by: Sydney Newman
- Starring: Patrick Macnee; Ian Hendry; Honor Blackman; Julie Stevens; Diana Rigg; Linda Thorson; Patrick Newell
- Country of origin: United Kingdom
- Original language: English
- No. of series: 6
- No. of episodes: 161 (22 missing, 1 incomplete) (list of episodes)

Production
- Production locations: Teddington Studios (series 1–3); Associated British Studios (series 4–6)
- Running time: 50 minutes
- Production companies: ABC Television (series 1–3); Associated British Productions for ABC (series 4); ABC Television Films for ABC (series 5); ABC Television Films for Thames (series 6)

Original release
- Network: ITV
- Release: 7 January 1961 – 21 April 1969

Related
- The New Avengers

The Avengers is a British espionage television series that aired from 7 January 1961 to 21 April 1969. It initially focused on David Keel (Ian Hendry), aided by John Steed (Patrick Macnee). Hendry left after the first series; Steed then became the main character, partnered with a succession of assistants. His most famous assistants were intelligent, stylish, and assertive women: Cathy Gale (Honor Blackman), Emma Peel (Diana Rigg), and Tara King (Linda Thorson). Dresses and suits for the series were made by Pierre Cardin.

The series screened as one-hour episodes for its entire run. The first episode, "Hot Snow", aired on 7 January 1961. The final episode, "Bizarre", aired on 21 April 1969 in the United States, and on 17 May 1969 in the United Kingdom.

The Avengers was produced by ABC Weekend TV, a contractor within the ITV network. After a merger with Rediffusion London in July 1968, ABC Weekend became Thames Television, which continued production of the series, subcontracted to ABC Television Films. By 1969, The Avengers was shown in more than 90 countries. ITV produced a sequel series, The New Avengers (1976–1977), with Patrick Macnee returning as John Steed, and two new partners. In 2004 and 2007, The Avengers was ranked No. 17 and No. 20 on TV Guide's Top Cult Shows Ever.

== History ==
The Avengers initially follows Dr David Keel, who is drawn to fight the criminal underworld after the murder of his fiancée and becomes an amateur associate of intelligence operative John Steed. Subsequently, Steed's further investigations alongside various other partners are shown.

=== Series 1 (1961) ===
ABC Weekend TV produced a single series of Police Surgeon, in which Ian Hendry played police surgeon Geoffrey Brent, from September through December 1960. While Police Surgeon did not last long, viewers praised Ian Hendry, and ABC Television cast him in its new series The Avengers, which replaced Police Surgeon in January 1961.

The Avengers began with the episode "Hot Snow", in which medical doctor David H. Keel (Hendry) investigates the murder of his fiancée, office receptionist Peggy, by a drug ring. A stranger named John Steed, who was also investigating the ring, appears. Together, Dr. Keel and Steed set out to avenge Peggy's death in the first two episodes. Steed asks Dr. Keel to partner with him, as needed, to solve crimes. Ian Hendry was considered the star of the new series, receiving top billing over Patrick Macnee, and Steed did not appear in two of the series' episodes.

As the first series of The Avengers progressed, Steed's importance increased, and he carried the final episode solo. While Steed and Dr. Keel used wit while discussing crimes and dangers, the series also depicted the interplay—and often tension—between Dr. Keel's idealism and Steed's professionalism. As seen in one of the three surviving episodes from the first series, "The Frighteners", Steed also had informants among the general population to aid his investigations, similar to the "Baker Street Irregulars" of Sherlock Holmes.

The other regular in the first series was Carol Wilson (Ingrid Hafner), the nurse and receptionist who replaced the slain Peggy. Carol assisted Dr. Keel and Steed in cases, and in at least one episode ("Girl on the Trapeze") was very much in the thick of the action, but without being part of Steed's inner circle. Ingrid Hafner had played opposite Ian Hendry as a nurse in one episode of Police Surgeon. The role of Carol Wilson was initially offered to Jan Watson, who turned it down for another film.

The series was shot on 405-line videotape using a multicamera setup. There was little provision for editing and virtually no location footage was shot (although the first shot of the first episode consisted of location footage). As was standard practice at the time, videotapes of early episodes of The Avengers were reused. At present, only three complete Series 1 episodes are known to exist and are held in archives as 16-mm film telerecordings: "Girl on the Trapeze" (which does not feature Steed), "The Frighteners" and "Tunnel of Fear". Additionally, the first 15 minutes of the first episode, "Hot Snow", also exist as a telerecording; the extant footage ends at the conclusion of the first act, prior to the introduction of John Steed.

The missing television episodes were recreated for audio by Big Finish Productions under the title of The Avengers – The Lost Episodes and star Julian Wadham as Steed, Anthony Howell as Dr Keel and Lucy Briggs-Owen as Carol Wilson.

=== Series 2–3 (1962–1964) ===
Patrick Macnee as John Steed and Honor Blackman as Cathy Gale

Production of the first series was cut short by a strike. By the time production could begin on the second series, Ian Hendry had quit to pursue a film career. Patrick Macnee was promoted to star, and Steed became the focus of the series, initially working with a rotation of three different partners. Dr Martin King (Jon Rollason), a thinly disguised recreation of the Dr. Keel character, saw action in only three episodes, which were produced from scripts written for the first series. Dr. King was intended to be a transitional character between Dr. Keel and Steed's two new female partners, but while the Dr. King episodes were shot first, they were shown out of production order during the season. Macnee was the only actor to receive a starring credit in the three Dr. King episodes.

Nightclub singer Venus Smith (Julie Stevens) appeared in six episodes. She was a complete "amateur", meaning that she did not have any professional crime-fighting skills as did the two doctors. She was excited to be participating in a spy adventure alongside secret agent Steed (although some episodes—"The Removal Men", "The Decapod"—indicate she is not always enthusiastic). Nonetheless, she appears to be attracted to him, and their relationship is somewhat similar to that later portrayed between Steed and Tara King. Her episodes featured live musical portions showcasing her singing performances. The character of Venus underwent some revision during her run, adopting more youthful demeanour and dress.

The first episode broadcast in the second series introduced the partner who would change the show into the format for which it is most remembered. Honor Blackman played Mrs. Cathy Gale, a self-assured, quick-witted anthropologist who was skilled in judo and had a passion for leather clothes. Widowed during the Mau Mau rebellion years in Kenya, she was the "talented amateur" who provided her aid to Steed's cases as a service to her nation. She was said to have been born on 5 October 1930 at midnight, and was reared in Africa. Gale was in her early-to-mid 30s during her tenure, in contrast to female characters in similar series, who tended to be younger.

Gale was unlike any female character seen before on British TV, and she became a household name. Reportedly, part of her charm was because her earliest appearances were episodes in which dialogue written for Keel was simply transferred to her. Series scriptwriter Dennis Spooner described this detail: "There's the famous story of how Honor Blackman played Ian Hendry's part, which is why they stuck her in leather and such—it was so much cheaper than changing the lines!" In "Conspiracy of Silence", she holds her own in a vociferous tactical disagreement with her partner.

Venus Smith did not return for the third series, and Cathy Gale became Steed's only regular partner. The series established a level of sexual tension between Steed and Gale, but the writers were not allowed to go beyond flirting and innuendo. Despite this, the relationship between Steed and Gale was progressive for 1962–63. In "The Golden Eggs," it is revealed that Gale lived in Steed's flat; according to Steed, her rent was to keep the refrigerator well-stocked and to cook for him (she appears to do neither). However, this was said to be a temporary arrangement while she looked for a new home, and Steed was sleeping at a hotel.

During the first series, there were hints that Steed worked for a branch of British Intelligence, and this was expanded in the second series. Steed initially received orders from different superiors, including someone referred to as "Charles", and "One-Ten" (Douglas Muir). By the third series, the delivery of Steed's orders was not depicted on screen or explained. The secret organisation to which Steed belongs is shown in "The Nutshell", and it is Gale's first visit to their headquarters.

Small references to Steed's background were occasionally made. In the Series 3 episode "Death of a Batman", it was said that Steed was with I Corps in World War II, and in Munich in 1945. In the Series 4 episode "The Hour That Never Was", Steed attends a reunion of his RAF squadron. Since the ties he wears are either cavalry or old school, it is apparent that he has attended a number of leading public schools.

A theatrical film version of the series was in its initial planning stages by late 1963, after Series 3 was completed. An early story proposal paired Steed and Gale with a male and female duo of American agents, to make the movie appeal to the American market. Before the project could gain momentum, Honor Blackman was cast opposite Sean Connery in Goldfinger, requiring her to leave the series.

==== Series transformation ====
During the Gale era, Steed was transformed from a rugged trenchcoat-wearing agent into the stereotypical English gentleman, complete with Savile Row suit, bowler hat and umbrella, with clothes later designed by Pierre Cardin. (Steed had first donned bowler and carried his distinctive umbrella during the first series, as "The Frighteners" depicts.) The bowler and umbrella were soon revealed to be full of tricks, including a sword hidden within the umbrella handle and a steel plate concealed in the hat. These items were referred to in the French, German and Polish titles of the series, Chapeau melon et bottes de cuir ("Bowler hat and leather boots"); Mit Schirm, Charme und Melone ("With Umbrella, Charm and Bowler Hat"); and Rewolwer i melonik ("A Revolver and a Bowler Hat"), respectively. With his impeccable manners, old-world sophistication and vintage car, Steed came to represent the traditional Englishman of an earlier era.

By contrast, Steed's partners were youthful, forward-looking and always attired in the latest mod fashions. Catherine Gale's innovative leather outfits suited her many athletic fight scenes. Honor Blackman became a star in Britain with her black leather outfits and boots (nicknamed "kinky boots") and her judo-based fighting style. Patrick Macnee and Honor Blackman even released a novelty song called "Kinky Boots". Honor Blackman also carried a pistol in "Killer Whale". Some of the clothes seen in The Avengers were designed at the studio of John Sutcliffe, who published the AtomAge fetish magazine.

Series scriptwriter Dennis Spooner said that the series would frequently feature Steed visiting busy public places, such as the main airport in London, without anyone else present in the scene: "'Can't you afford extras?' they'd ask. Well, it wasn't like that. It's just that Steed had to be alone to be accepted. Put him in a crowd and he sticks out like a sore thumb! Let's face it, with normal people he's weird. The trick to making him acceptable is never to show him in a normal world, just fighting villains who are odder than he is!"

=== Series 4–5 (1965–1967) ===
The show was sold to the American Broadcasting Company (ABC) in 1965, and The Avengers became one of the first British series to be aired on prime-time US television. The US ABC network paid the then-unheard-of sum of $2 million for the first 26 episodes. The average budget for each episode was reportedly £56,000, which was high for the British industry. The fourth series aired in the US from March to the beginning of September 1966. Each episode still finished with the logo of ABC Weekend TV.

The US deal meant that the producers could afford to start shooting the series on 35mm film, with production transferring from ABC's television studios in Teddington to the Associated British film studios in Elstree. The use of film, rather than the videotape of the earlier episodes, was essential, because British 405-line video was technically incompatible with the US NTSC videotape format. Filmed productions were standard on US prime-time television at the time. The Avengers continued to be produced in black-and-white.

The transfer to film meant that episodes would be shot using the single-camera setup, giving the production greater flexibility. The use of film production and the single-camera production style allowed more sophisticated visuals and camera angles, and more outdoor location shots, all of which greatly improved the look of the series. As was standard on British television filmed production through the 1960s, all location work on Series 4 was shot mute, with the soundtrack created in post-production. Dialogue scenes were filmed in the studio, leading to some jumps between location and studio footage.

Diana Rigg as Mrs Emma Peel

New female partner Mrs. Emma Peel (Diana Rigg) debuted in October 1965. The name of the character derived from a comment by writers, during development, that they wanted a character with "man appeal". In an early attempt to incorporate this concept into the character's name, she was called "Samantha Peel", shortened to the awkward "Mantha Peel". Eventually, the writers began referring to the idea by the verbal shorthand "M. Appeal", which gave rise to the character's ultimate name.

After more than 60 actresses had been auditioned, the first choice to play the role was Elizabeth Shepherd. However, after filming one and a half episodes (the pilot, "The Town of No Return", and part of "The Murder Market"), Elizabeth Shepherd was released. Her on-screen personality was deemed less interesting than that of Honor Blackman's Catherine Gale, and it was decided that she was not right for the role. Another 20 actresses were auditioned before the show's casting director, Dodo Watts, suggested that producers Brian Clemens and Albert Fennell check out a televised drama featuring the relatively unknown Diana Rigg. (She had earlier guested in an episode of The Sentimental Agent that Brian Clemens had written.) Diana Rigg's screen test with Patrick Macnee showed that the two immediately worked well together.

A prologue was added to the beginning of all the fourth-series episodes for the American broadcasts. This was to clarify some initial confusion audiences had regarding the characters and their mission. In the opener, a waiter holding a champagne bottle falls dead onto a human-sized chessboard, a dagger protruding from a target on his back. Steed and Mrs. Emma Peel (dressed in her trademark leather catsuit) walk up to the body as the voice-over explains: "Extraordinary crimes against the people, and the state, have to be avenged by agents extraordinary. Two such people are John Steed, top professional, and his partner Emma Peel, talented amateur. Otherwise known as The Avengers". During this voice-over, Steed pours two drinks from the wine bottle and Mrs. Peel replaces her gun in her boot. They clink glasses and depart together as the screen fades to black and the opening titles begin.

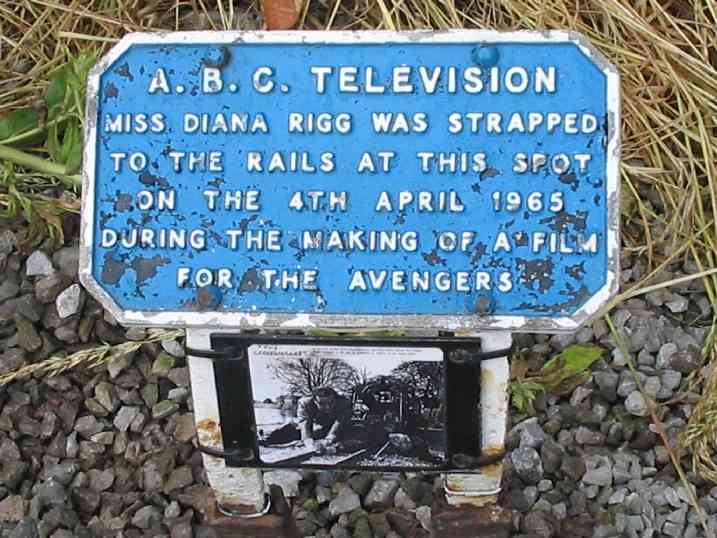
Film location plate presented by ABC Weekend TV to the Stapleford Miniature Railway, which is still in use today

In contrast to the Gale episodes, there is a lighter, comic touch in Steed's and Mrs. Emma Peel's interactions with each other and their reactions to other characters and situations. Earlier series had a harder tone, with the Gale era including some quite serious espionage dramas. This almost completely disappeared as Steed and Mrs. Emma Peel visibly enjoy topping each other's witticisms. The layer of conflict with Catherine Gale—who on occasion openly resented being used by Steed, often without her permission—is absent from Steed's interaction with Emma Peel. Also, the sexual tension between Steed and Catherine Gale is quite different from that between Steed and Emma Peel. In both cases, the exact relationship between the partners is left ambiguous, although they seemed to have carte blanche to visit each other's homes whenever they please, and it is not uncommon for scenes to suggest that Steed had spent the night at Catherine Gale's or Emma Peel's home, or vice versa. Although nothing "improper" is displayed, the close chemistry between Steed and Mrs. Emma Peel constantly suggests intimacy between the two.

Science fiction and fantasy elements (a style later known as Spy-Fi) also began to emerge in storylines. The duo encounter killer robots ("The Cybernauts"), telepaths ("Too Many Christmas Trees") and giant alien carnivorous plants ("The Man-Eater of Surrey Green").

In her fourth episode, "Death at Bargain Prices," Mrs. Emma Peel takes an undercover job at a department store. Her uniform for promoting space-age toys is an elaborate leather catsuit plus silver boots, sash and welder's gloves. The suit (minus the silver accessories) became her signature outfit, which she wore primarily for fight scenes in early episodes and in the titles. Some episodes contain a fetishistic undercurrent. In "A Touch of Brimstone", Mrs. Peel dresses in a dominatrix outfit of corset, laced boots and spiked collar to become the "Queen of Sin".

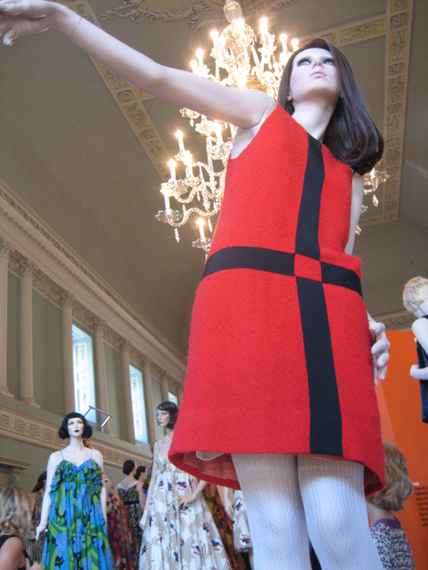
John Bates minidress, 1965. Based on a design for Emma Peel in The Avengers.

Emma Peel's avant-garde fashions, featuring bold accents and high-contrast geometric patterns, emphasise her youthful, contemporary personality. For the 1965 series, some of her most memorable outfits were designed by John Bates, including graphic black-and-white Op art mini-coats and accessories, and a silver ensemble comprising a bra bodice, low-slung trousers and jacket. She represents the modern England of the Sixties – just as Steed, with his vintage style and mannerisms, personifies Edwardian-era nostalgia. According to Patrick Macnee in his book The Avengers and Me, Diana Rigg disliked wearing leather and insisted on a new line of fabric athletic wear for the fifth series. Alun Hughes, who had designed clothing for Diana Rigg's personal wardrobe, was suggested by the actress to design Emma Peel's "softer" new wardrobe. Pierre Cardin was brought in to design a new wardrobe for Macnee. In the US, TV Guide ran a four-page photo spread on Diana Rigg's new "Emmapeeler" outfits (10–16 June 1967). Eight tight-fitting jumpsuits were created, in a variety of bright colours and made of the stretch fabric crimplene.

Diana Rigg was initially unhappy with the way she was treated by the show's producers. During her first series, she learned that she was being paid less than the cameraman. She demanded a raise to put her more on a par with her co-star, or she would leave the show. The producers gave in, thanks to the show's great popularity in the US.

==== Move to colour ====
After one filmed series (of 26 episodes) in black and white, The Avengers began filming in colour for the fifth series in 1966. It was three years before Britain's ITV network began full colour broadcasting. The first 16 episodes of this series were broadcast concurrently in the US, in colour, and the UK, in black and white, from January to May 1967. Eight further episodes were broadcast in the UK beginning in late September, while these episodes were withheld in the US until early 1968, where they would be immediately succeeded by the first batch of episodes featuring Diana Rigg's replacement, Linda Thorson. The American prologue of the fourth series was modified for the colour episodes. The show opened with the caption The Avengers in Color (required by the US ABC for colour series at that time), followed by Steed unwrapping the foil from a champagne bottle and Emma Peel shooting the cork away. Unlike the "chessboard" opening of the previous series, this new prologue had no narrative voice-over, and the scene was also included in UK broadcasts of the series. At the end of the closing credits, all previous series had ended with the ABC Weekend TV logo, but the fifth and sixth series — now made by ABC's sister company A.B.C. Television Films — instead featured an animation where the letters "ABC" were revealed to stand for "Associated British Corporation", a name apparently invented for ABC shows exported to the US to avoid confusion with the US ABC network. (The legal name of ABC Weekend TV was originally "Associated British Cinemas (Television) Ltd", later shortened to "A.B.C. Television Ltd".)

The first 16 episodes of the fifth series begin with Emma Peel receiving a call-to-duty message from Steed: "Mrs. Peel, we're needed". Emma Peel would be conducting her normal activities when she unexpectedly received a message on a calling card or within a delivered gift, at which point Steed suddenly appeared (usually in her apartment). The series also introduced a comic tagline caption to the episode title, using the format of "Steed [does this], Emma [does that]". For example, "The Joker" had the opening caption: "Steed trumps an ace, Emma plays a lone hand". "The Joker" was to a large extent a rewrite of "Don't Look Behind You", a black-and-white Cathy Gale episode. Three other colour Emma Peel episodes were rewrites of Cathy Gale episodes.

The "Mrs Peel, we're needed" scenes and the alternate taglines were dropped after the first 16 episodes, after a break in production, for financial reasons. They were deemed by the UK networks as disposable if The Avengers was to return to ITV screens (Dave Rogers' book The Avengers Anew lists a set for every Steed/Emma Peel episode except "The Forget-Me-Knot").

Stories were increasingly characterised by a futuristic, science-fiction bent, with mad scientists and their creations wreaking havoc. The duo dealt with being shrunk to doll size ("Mission... Highly Improbable"), pet cats being electrically altered to become ferocious and lethal "miniature tigers" ("The Hidden Tiger"), killer automata ("Return of The Cybernauts"), mind-transferring machines ("Who's Who???") and invisible foes ("The See-Through Man").

The series parodied its American contemporaries with episodes such as "The Girl From AUNTIE", "Mission... Highly Improbable" and "The Winged Avenger" (spoofing The Man from U.N.C.L.E., Mission: Impossible and Batman, respectively). The show still carried the basic format: Steed and his associate were charged with solving the problem in the space of a 50-minute episode, thus preserving the safety of 1960s Britain.

Humour was evident in the names and acronyms of the organisations. For example, in "The Living Dead," two rival groups examine reported ghost sightings: FOG (Friends of Ghosts) and SMOG (Scientific Measurement of Ghosts). "The Hidden Tiger" features the Philanthropic Union for Rescue, Relief and Recuperation of Cats—PURRR—led by characters named Cheshire, Manx and Angora.

The series also occasionally adopted a metafictional tone, coming close to breaking the fourth wall. In the Series 5 episode "Something Nasty in the Nursery", Emma Peel directly refers to the series' storytelling convention of having potentially helpful sources of information killed off just before she or Steed arrive. This then occurs a few minutes later. In the tag scene for the same episode, Steed and Emma Peel tell viewers—indirectly—to tune in next week.

Diana Rigg's stunt double was stuntwoman Cyd Child, though stuntman Peter Elliot doubled for Diana Rigg in a stunt dive in "The Bird Who Knew Too Much".

==== Diana Rigg's departure ====
At the end of the fifth series in 1967, Diana Rigg left to pursue other projects. This included following Honor Blackman to play a leading role in a James Bond film, On Her Majesty's Secret Service, as James Bond's wife Tracy Bond.

On 25 October 2015, to mark 50 years of Emma Peel, the BFI (British Film Institute) screened an episode of The Avengers followed by an onstage interview with Diana Rigg, during which she discussed her reasons for leaving the show and Patrick Macnee's reaction to her departure. Patrick Macnee and Diana Rigg remained lifelong friends.

=== Series 6 (1968–1969) ===
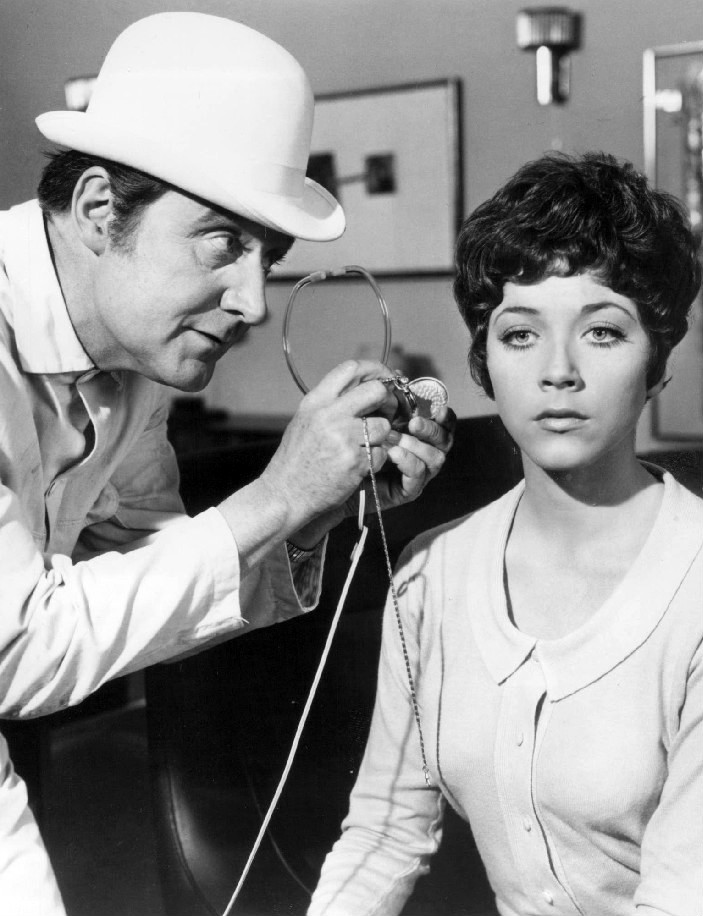
Macnee and Linda Thorson

When Diana Rigg left the series in October 1967, the British network executives decided that the current series formula, despite resulting in popular success, could not be pursued further. Thus, they decided that a "return to realism" was appropriate for the sixth series (1968–69). Brian Clemens and Albert Fennell were replaced by John Bryce, producer of most of the Cathy Gale-era episodes.

Bryce had a difficult situation to handle. He had to find a replacement for Diana Rigg and shoot the first seven episodes of the new series, which were supposed to be shipped to the US together with the last eight Emma Peel colour episodes. Bryce signed his then-girlfriend, 20-year-old newcomer Linda Thorson, as the new female co-star and chose the name Tara King for her character. Thorson played the role with more innocence in mind and at heart, and unlike the previous partnerships with Cathy Gale and Emma Peel, the writers allowed subtle hints of romance to blossom between Steed and King. King also differed from Steed's previous partners in that she was a fully fledged (albeit initially inexperienced) agent working for Steed's organisation; his previous partners had all been (in the words of the prologue used for American broadcasts of the first Rigg series) talented amateurs. Bryce wanted Tara to be blonde, so Thorson's brown hair was bleached. However, the process badly damaged her hair, so she had to wear wigs for the first third of her episodes, until her own hair grew back. Her natural brown hair was not seen until the episode, "All Done with Mirrors."

Production of the first seven episodes of the sixth series began, but the financial problems and internal difficulties undermined Bryce's effort. He only managed to complete three episodes: "Invitation to a Killing" (a 90-minute episode introducing Tara King), "The Great, Great Britain Crime" (some of its original footage was reused in the 1969 episode "Homicide and Old Lace"), and "Invasion of the Earthmen" (which survived relatively intact except for the scenes in which Tara wears a brown wig).

After a rough cut screening of these episodes to studio executives, John Bryce was fired and Brian Clemens and Albert Fennell were summoned back. At their return, a fourth episode called "The Murderous Connection" was in its second day of production. After revising the script, it was renamed as "The Curious Case of the Countless Clues" and production resumed. Production of the episode "Split!", a leftover script from the Emma Peel colour series, proceeded. Two completely new episodes were also shot: "Get-A-Way", and "Look (Stop Me If You've Heard This One) But There Were These Two Fellers".

Dennis Spooner said of the event:

Brian left The Avengers for about three episodes, someone took over, and when Brian came back, it was in a terrible state. He was faced with doing a rewrite on a film they'd already shot. The episode had a story error where Steed leaves for a destination. The villains then realise this and pursue him – yet arrive there before Steed does. It was fixed by having a character ask Steed 'What took you so long?', to which he replies 'I came the pretty way'. "You can only do that on The Avengers you see. It was just my favourite show to work on.

Brian Clemens and Albert Fennell decided to film a new episode to introduce Tara King. This, the third episode filmed for the sixth series, was titled "The Forget-Me-Knot" and bade farewell to Emma Peel and introduced her successor, a trained but inexperienced agent named Tara King. It would be broadcast as the first episode of the sixth series. Tara debuts in dynamic style: when Steed is called to Headquarters, he is attacked and knocked down by trainee agent Tara King, who mistakes him for her training partner.

No farewell scenes for Emma Peel had been shot when Diana Rigg left the series. She was recalled for "The Forget-Me-Knot", through which Emma acts as Steed's partner as usual. Diana Rigg also filmed a farewell scene for Emma that appeared as the tag scene of the episode. It was explained that Emma's husband, Peter Peel, was found alive and rescued, and she left the British secret service to be with him. Emma visits Steed to say goodbye, and while leaving she passes Tara on the stairway giving the advice that "he likes his tea stirred anti-clockwise". Steed looks out of the window as a departing Emma enters the Bentley driven by Peter, who from a distance seems to resemble Steed (and was played by Steed's regular stunt double, with bowler hat and umbrella).

John Bryce's original episode introducing Tara, "Invitation to a Killing", was revised as a regular 60-minute episode named "Have Guns Will Haggle". These episodes, together with "Invasion of the Earthmen" and the last eight Emma Peel colour episodes, were shipped to the US in February 1968.

For this series the government official who gave Steed his orders was depicted on screen. Mother, introduced in "The Forget-Me-Knot," is a man in a wheelchair. The role was taken by Patrick Newell, who had played different roles in two earlier episodes, most recently in Series 5. Mother's headquarters would shift from place to place, including one episode in which his complete office was on the top level of a double-decker bus. Several James Bond films of the 1970s would make use of a similar gimmick for Bond's briefings.

Added later as a regular was Mother's mute Amazonian assistant, Rhonda, played by uncredited actress Rhonda Parker. There was one appearance by an agency official code-named "Father", a blind older woman played by Iris Russell. (Iris Russell had appeared in the series several times previously in other roles.) In one episode, "Killer", Steed is paired with Lady Diana Forbes Blakeney (Jennifer Croxton) while King is on holiday.

Scriptwriter Dennis Spooner later reflected: "When I wrote 'Look (Stop Me If You've Heard This One) But There Were These Two Fellers', that was definitely the last series. They were going to make no more, so in that series we went right over the top; we went really weird, because they knew there weren't going to be any more".

Dennis Spooner said the series "worked because it became a parody on itself, almost. You can only do that so long." He attributes the overall success of the show to its light approach: "We spoofed everything; we took Mission: Impossible, Bad Day at Black Rock, High Noon, The Dirty Dozen, The Birds... we took them all. The film buffs used to love it. There were always lines in it that people knew what we were talking about".

The revised series continued to be broadcast in the US. The episodes with Linda Thorson as Tara King proved to be highly rated in the UK and overall in Europe. However, in the US, the ABC network chose to air it opposite the number-one show in the country at the time, Rowan and Martin's Laugh-In. Steed and Tara King could not compete, and the show was cancelled in the US. Without this vital commercial backing, production could not continue in Britain either, and the series ended in May 1969. The final scene of the final episode ("Bizarre") has Steed and King, champagne glasses in hand, accidentally launching themselves into orbit aboard a rocket, as Mother breaks the fourth wall and says to the audience "They'll be back!", before adding in shock "They're unchaperoned up there!"

== Cast ==
Character	Actor	No. of episodes	Series					
Dr David Keel	Ian Hendry	25	1					
John Steed	Patrick Macnee	159	1	2	3	4	5	6
Carol Wilson	Ingrid Hafner	19	1					
One-ten	Douglas Muir	10	1	2				
Venus Smith	Julie Stevens	6		2				
Dr Martin King	Jon Rollason	3		2				
Judy	Gillian Muir	2		2				
Dr Cathy Gale	Honor Blackman	43		2	3			
Mrs Emma Peel	Diana Rigg	51				4	5	☆
Brodny	Warren Mitchell	2				4	5	
Tara King	Linda Thorson	33						6
Mother	Patrick Newell	20						6
Rhonda	Rhonda Parker	18						6

☆ Emma Peel also appeared in the first episode of The Avengers Series 6, and archive footage of her was used in one episode of the second series of The New Avengers.

- Patrick Macnee as John Steed (Series 1–6)
- Ian Hendry as Dr David Keel (Series 1)
- Honor Blackman as Cathy Gale (Series 2–3)
- Jon Rollason as Dr Martin King (Series 2)
- Julie Stevens as Venus Smith (Series 2)
- Diana Rigg as Emma Peel (Series 4–5)
- Linda Thorson as Tara King (Series 6)

== Production ==
=== Music ===
The 1961 series featured a jazz-influenced theme by John Dankworth. Library music was used sparsely as a soundtrack, sometimes with variations based on the main theme. Dankworth's theme music was reworked for the third series. John Dankworth's first theme was recorded on the Columbia label, on a 45 rpm single, and a new recording, similar to the reworked television theme was issued on Fontana in 1963. A very faithful cover version was released by Johnny Gregory.

When Diana Rigg joined the series in 1965, the opening credits of the series were redesigned and new theme music by Laurie Johnson was introduced. This was based on a previously released title on LP, called "The Shake" (which capitalised on "The Shake" dance craze of the '60s). For the colour series (1967), a percussion section was added to accompany the new teaser sequence at the start of each episode. Laurie Johnson re-scored the theme when Linda Thorson joined the series, adding a counter-melody on trumpet, based on the leitmotif for Tara King from the final Diana Rigg episode "The Forget-Me-Knot." The new theme debuted in the closing titles of the episode "The Forget-Me-Knot," which introduced Linda Thorson. It was altogether more dynamic, and included a much more frenetic percussion section, for the revised teaser sequence. Importantly, the filmed episodes contained specially composed scores by Johnson. To accompany Steed's request, "Mrs. Peel – we're needed!", he composed a brief 'sting', and there was also a special theme for 'Emma'. For the 'Linda Thorson' series, a characteristic piece was composed to accompany the tag scene, at the end of each episode. Many of the most memorable cues from the Rigg/Thorson series, including the opening, and closing titles themes, and the 'Tag Scene' were released commercially on CD in 2009.

Owing to a professional commitment to score for the film Hot Millions (starring Peter Ustinov and Maggie Smith), Laurie Johnson requested assistance from his keyboard player, Howard Blake, who scored some of the episodes of the final season, as well as additional music for other episodes which Laurie Johnson did not have time to complete. These were composed in a style remarkably similar to Laurie Johnson's. In 2011, to mark the 50th anniversary of the series, these almost-complete scores by Howard Blake−including Laurie Johnson's themes for the main and end titles—were issued on a double-CD set. Of the original Johnson theme, countless cover versions have been released on vinyl and CD, and the opening motif was retained on the series The New Avengers.

Laurie Johnson subsequently collaborated with Brian Clemens on other projects, including the theme for The New Avengers.

=== Cars ===
The cars used in the series became almost as famous as the actors. From the 4th series on, Steed's signature cars were six vintage, green 1926–1928 Bentley racing or town cars, including Blower Bentleys and Bentley Speed Sixes (although, uniquely, in "The Thirteenth Hole" he drives a Vauxhall 30-98). In the final series, he drove two yellow Rolls-Royces – a 1923 Rolls-Royce Silver Ghost and a 1927 Rolls-Royce New Phantom. Peel drove Lotus Elan convertibles (a white 1964 and a powder blue 1966), which, like her clothes, emphasised her independence and vitality. During the first Peel series (Series 4), each episode ended with a short, humorous scene of the duo leaving the scene of their most recent adventure in some unusual vehicle. Mother occasionally appeared in a silver Rolls-Royce. Tara King drove an AC 428 and a Lotus Europa. Lady Diana Forbes Blakeney drove an MGC Roadster.

=== Production team ===
Sydney Newman, who would later go on to spearhead the creation of Doctor Who for the BBC, never received screen credit as the creator of The Avengers. In his memoir, The Avengers and Me, Patrick Macnee interviewed Newman about this. Newman explained that he never sought on-screen credit on the series because during his previous tenure at the Canadian Broadcasting Corporation, such credits were not given, and he never thought to get one for The Avengers.

The production team changed during the series' long run, particularly between the third and fourth series, but the influence of Brian Clemens was felt throughout. He wrote the second episode and became the series' most prolific scriptwriter. Succeeding producers Leonard White and John Bryce, Julian Wintle became the producer of the 4th series with Brian Clemens credited as associate producer and Albert Fennell credited as "In charge of production". For series 5, made by A.B.C. Television Films (which was created during the run-up to ABC Weekend TV and Associated-Rediffusion forming Thames TV) Clemens and Fennell became co-producers, with Wintle as executive producer. For series 6, after its initial producer John Bryce left, Clemens and Fennell returned as co-producers; early episodes also credit Julian Wintle as consultant to the series and Philip Levene as story consultant.

Ray Austin became the fight arranger for series 4 and 5, introducing kung fu to the series. Ray Austin had been training with Chee Soo and they worked techniques from Feng Shou kung fu and tai chi into the fight scenes and credit sequences. Ray Austin, Diana Rigg and Chee Soo were later awarded a Guinness world record as the first people to show kung fu on television. Later he became a prolific television director. Joe Dunne took over for series 6.

== Episodes ==
Six series of The Avengers were made between 1961 and 1969. There was an enforced break in filming and transmission towards the end of series five due to financial problems. Television researcher Andrew Pixley and authors Paul Cornell, Martin Day and Keith Topping in their book The Avengers Dossier: The Unauthorised and Unofficial Guide consider the last eight episodes produced after the break as constituting a short series six, and therefore count seven series in total. Within the internal production of The Avengers the last eight episodes were considered to be a continuation of series five.

UK				US			Principal characters	Production format & company
Series / episodes			First broadcast	Season / episodes		Air dates	Principal characters	Production format & company
1	26		Jan–Dec 1961	—			Keel and Steed	black and white video ABC Television (UK)
2	26		Sep 1962 – Mar 1963	—			Steed, Smith and Gale	black and white video ABC Television (UK)
3	26		Sep 1963 – Mar 1964	—			Steed and Gale	black and white video ABC Television (UK)
4	26		Sep 1965 – Mar 1966	1	26	Mar–Sep 1966	Steed and Peel	black and white film Associated British Productions
5	24	16	Jan–May 1967	2	16	Jan–May 1967	Steed and Peel	colour film ABC Television Films (UK)
5	24	8	Sep–Nov 1967	3	15	Jan–May 1968	Steed and Peel	colour film ABC Television Films (UK)
6	33		Sep 1968 – May 1969	3	15	Jan–May 1968	Steed and King	colour film ABC Television Films (UK)
6	33		Sep 1968 – May 1969	4	26	Sep 1968 – Apr 1969	Steed and King	colour film ABC Television Films (UK)

== Reception ==
=== In Canada and the United States ===
Although telerecordings of the second and third series were seen in Canada as early as 1963, the first two series of The Avengers were not broadcast on television in the United States. The American ABC purchased the rights to broadcast seasons 4 and 5 in the United States in 1965. The sale of The Avengers to United States television prompted a change in production style from the 405-line British multi-camera stand to the single-camera shooting method, originated on 35mm film.

The series' stunt man and stunt arranger Ray Austin expressed the opinion that the show's violence ultimately harmed its popular success in the United States. There The Avengers was given a late timeslot due to its violence: "They did that with the first Avengers here [in the U.S.], with Diana Rigg. They put us on at 11:30 pm on CBS [sic], because it was too violent". Austin goes on to explain that US television follows a "different code". Austin said that on The Avengers "we were determined to do the show our way, the English way, and no one was going to stop us! And, indeed, no one did stop us. We never, never got to prime time. And it was our own faults, because we would not comply to the Midwest. That's where the money comes from in this country, nowhere else. Forget Los Angeles, forget New York—you have to aim for the Midwest. If the Midwest watches your show, you've made it". In fact the first and second series of Emma Peel episodes mainly aired at 10:00 pm on ABC. The final Rigg episodes and all the Linda Thorson episodes mainly ran at 7:30 pm, also on ABC.

American censors objected to some content, in particular the episode "A Touch of Brimstone", which featured a modern-day version of the Hellfire Club and climaxed with Emma being dressed in a skimpy corset costume with spiked collar and high-heeled boots to become the Queen of Sin, and being attacked with a whip by guest star Peter Wyngarde. The American broadcast network refused to air it. In total five episodes from the first Emma Peel series were not initially broadcast by ABC. These were: "A Surfeit of H_{2}O", "Silent Dust" (which featured Emma being attacked with a horsewhip), "Quick-Quick Slow Death", "A Touch of Brimstone" and "Honey for the Prince" (in which Emma performed the dance of the seven veils), although they were seen in later syndicated repeats.

Earlier Cathy Gale and Venus Smith episodes had aired in Canada before the arrival of Mrs. Peel. US audiences saw the 1962–1964 Gale and Smith episodes of the series for the first time in the early 1990s when they were broadcast on the A&E Network. No Keel episode of the series was ever repeatedly broadcast outside Britain, contributing to the fact nearly all first-series episodes are now lost, and even in the UK only one surviving episode, "The Frighteners", was rebroadcast (as part of a run of classic episodes on Channel 4 in early 1993, otherwise mostly consisting of Gale episodes).

== Home media ==
Only three complete episodes from the show's first series, plus a portion of another episode, are known to exist, as 16mm film telerecordings. These are "The Frighteners" (an extract of which is playing on a television in the film Quadrophenia), "Girl on the Trapeze", which was found in the UCLA Film and Television Archive via an internet search of their on-line database, and "Tunnel of Fear", which was found in 2016. Additionally, part of the show's first episode was also found in the United States. The footage is of the episode's first 21 minutes, up to the first commercial break.

All series 2 and series 3 episodes survive as 16mm telerecordings. These have been released to DVD, as have all of the Emma Peel and Tara King episodes, which were shot on film. The two earlier-found surviving complete Keel episodes, plus the remnant of the first episode, have also been released in the UK and US, but are not currently available in the US. None of the original videotapes of series 1, 2 and 3 survive.

From the late 1990s to the early 2000s, A&E TV Home Entertainment (under license from Canal+ Image International) released the remaining surviving series on Region 1 DVD in North America, with newly remastered picture and sound quality.

Series 4, 5 and 6 were remastered and released on Blu-ray by Studio Canal.

== Sequel ==
=== The New Avengers ===
The sustained popularity of the Tara King episodes in France led to a 1975 French television advertisement for Laurent-Perrier champagne in which Thorson and Macnee reprised their roles. The advertisement's success spurred financing interest in France for new episodes of The Avengers.

The result was a new series, The New Avengers. Patrick Macnee reprised the role of Steed, with two new partners, Mike Gambit (Gareth Hunt) and Purdey (Joanna Lumley). It aired on ITV in the UK in 1976–1977, CTV in Canada, CBS in the United States (in 1978–79) and TF1 in France (series 1 in 1976–1977 and series 2 in 1979). The final four episodes were almost completely produced by Canadian interests and were filmed there. In some markets they carried the title The New Avengers in Canada.

Although Macnee was the only actor from the original series to reprise his role, archival footage of Diana Rigg allowed Emma Peel to make a cameo appearance in a second-season episode "K is for Kill: The Tiger Awakes", while Macnee's first co-star, Ian Hendry, made a guest appearance as a different character in the episode "To Catch a Rat".

== Spin-offs ==
=== Novels ===
A number of original novels based on the series were published in the 1960s. The first by Douglas Enefer, published by Consul Books, was the only 60s novel to feature Cathy Gale. Panther Books published four novels written by John Garforth featuring Emma Peel in the United Kingdom in 1967; Berkley Medallion Books reprinted these in the United States. After Panther stopped publishing Avengers novels in the UK, Berkley Medallion continued publishing original novels of their own: one featuring Peel and four featuring Tara King for the US market only; three by Keith Laumer in 1968; and two by Norman Daniels 1968/69. Berkley Medallion later re-printed all nine novels with new covers that featured photos of both Rigg and Thorson, regardless of which Avengers girl appeared in the novel. The two novels published by Hodder and Stoughton in 1965/66 were co-written by Patrick Macnee, making him one of the first actors to write licensed spin-off fiction of their own shows. The Macnee novels, Deadline and Dead Duck, were reprinted in the UK by Titan Books in standard paperback in 1994 and in France by Huitieme Art (1995 & 1996). They were also published in the US for the first time by TV Books in 1998. Titan reissued the books in trade paperback format (with the same covers) to coincide with the release of the 1998 feature film.

The 1990 novel Too Many Targets by John Peel featured all of Steed's partners (David Keel, Cathy Gale, Emma Peel and Tara King) with the exception of Venus Smith and Dr Martin King.

- The Avengers, Douglas Enefer, 1963
- Deadline, Patrick Macnee and Peter Leslie, 1965
- Dead Duck, Macnee and Leslie, 1966
- The Floating Game, John Garforth, 1967
- The Laugh Was on Lazarus, Garforth, 1967
- The Passing of Gloria Munday, Garforth, 1967
- Heil Harris!, Garforth, 1967
- The Afrit Affair, Keith Laumer, 1968
- The Drowned Queen, Laumer, 1968
- The Gold Bomb, Laumer, 1968
- The Magnetic Man, Norman A. Daniels, 1968
- Moon Express, Daniels, 1969
- John Steed: An Authorized Biography Vol. 1: Jealous in Honour, Tim Heald, 1977 (UK release only)
- A four volume fan fiction set produced in Australia but authorised.
  - Vol. 1 The Weather Merchants (1989) by Dave Rogers and Barlow; Rogers had previously written several non-fiction books about the series
  - Vol. 2 The Monster of the Moor (1990) by Barlow
  - Vol. 3 Before the Mast (1991). A Tara short story, produced only in photocopied supplement format
  - Vol. 4 (1994). Contains two stories, Moonlight Express and The Spoilsports.
- Too Many Targets, John Peel and Rogers, 1990.
- The Avengers, Julie Kaewert, 1998 (film novelisation)

A short story by Peter Leslie entitled "What's a Ghoul Like You Doing in a Place Like This?" appeared in The Television Crimebusters Omnibus, a hardback anthology edited by Peter Haining, first published by Orion in 1994 (this Steed and Tara story first appeared in the 1969 UK Avengers annual, from Atlas publications). Both of the Macnee/Leslie UK paperback titles were translated and published in Portugal in 1967 as Os Vingadores: O Dia Depois De Amanha (Deadline) and Os Vingadores: O Pato Morto (Dead Duck) by Deaga. All four UK John Garforth Panther book paperbacks were translated and published by Roman in France (1967), a paperback omnibus edition was published in 1998 by Fleuve Noir. Three of the Garforth paperbacks were also translated and published by Heyne in Germany (1967/68) (Heil Harris! was not translated for obvious reasons) and a German hardback omnibus edition of the three titles was published by Lichtenberg (1968), reprinted in paperback by Heyne in 1998. All four titles were also translated and published in the Netherlands by Bruna (1967) and in Chile by Zig-Zag (1968).

=== Comics ===
The first UK Avengers comic strips, featuring Steed and Cathy Gale, first appeared in regional TV listings magazines Look Westward and The Viewer from 14 September 1963 to 9 May 1964 (and later in 1964, re-printed in the Manchester Evening News). This run consisted of four serials.

Steed and Mrs Peel comic strips began in Polystyle Publications' TV Comic in issue #720, dated 2 October 1965, beginning after the TV debut of Emma Peel, and ran until issue #771, dated 24 September 1966 – this run consisted of 10 serials plus one 4-page one-off in TV Comic Holiday Special (June 1966). At that point the rights were sold to publishers D.C. Thomson & Co. Ltd, where the next version of the strip appeared in issue #199, dated 10 December 1966, of Diana the popular paper for girls. Its run ended in issue #224, dated 2 June 1967, with art by Emilio Frejo and Juan Gonzalez Alacrojo – this run consisted of 8 serials.

Earlier, The Growing Up of Emma Peel comic strip had appeared in June and Schoolfriend comic from issue #52, dated 29 January 1966, to issue #63, dated 16 April 1966. This had featured the adventures of 14-year-old Emma Knight and was run concurrent with the TV Comic strip and consisted of 11 instalments.

The Avengers returned to TV Comic issue #877, dated 5 October 1968, just after Tara King debuted on TV, the Tara & Steed strip continued until issue #1077, dated 5 August 1972. This run consisted of 28 serials plus a 4-page one-off in TV Comic Holiday Special 1972. Also in 1966 Thorpe & Porter published a 68-page Avengers comic featuring Steed & Peel, with original art by Mick Anglo and Mick Austin — this consisted of four 16-page stories.

A few Avengers-related comic books have been published in the USA. They are not named The Avengers because the rights to the names "Avengers" and "New Avengers" are held by Marvel Comics for use with their Avengers comics depicting a team of superheroes called The Avengers. Gold Key Comics published one issue of John Steed Emma Peel in 1968 (subtitled The Avengers on the Indicia page), which included two newly coloured and reformatted The Avengers strips from TV Comic.

A 3-issue limited entitled Steed and Mrs. Peel appeared in 1990–1992 under the Acme Press/Eclipse Comics imprint; it featured a three-part story, "The Golden Game" in issues #1–3, by Grant Morrison and a two-part story, in issues #2 & #3, "A Deadly Rainbow" by Anne Caulfield; both strips had art by Ian Gibson. Boom! Studios reprinted this series in six issues in early 2012, and later published a new ongoing series written by Mark Waid and Caleb Monroe which lasted 12 issues. Boom! subsequently announced a six-issue follow-up series, Steed and Mrs. Peel: We're Needed, which was launched in the summer of 2014. Despite issue #1 showing "1 of 6", only 3 issues were produced ("2 of 3" and "3 of 3" showing on the other issues, with the cover for issue #3 being the one originally planned for issue #4 which was planned to be the start of another 3-issue story).

In the UK, where hardback annuals are traditionally produced for sale at Christmas, The Avengers first appeared in TV Crimebusters Annual (1962) and featured a 7-page comic strip with Dr David Keel titled The Drug Pedlar. Atlas Publications produced three The Avengers hardback Annuals for 1967, 1968 and 1969, which also featured original Avengers comic strips featuring Steed, Emma Peel, and Tara King, as well as text stories.

The TV Comic Avengers strips and the 1966 Avengers comic and a few comic strips from the Annuals have been translated and published in Germany, the Netherlands, France, and Chile.

The Avengers also have made a number of cameo appearances in comics over the years:

- In 1991's Doctor Who Magazine #173, Gary Russell and artists Mike Collins and Steve Pini show Captain Britain about to hit John Steed when Emma Peel shows up behind him.
- Emma Peel and John Steed were seen among the crowd in a bar scene in Kingdom Come #2 (1996) by Mark Waid and Alex Ross.
- Emma Peel and John Steed appeared unnamed in Superman #13 (1988) by John Byrne and Karl Kesel.
- A crossover series, Batman '66 Meets Steed and Mrs. Peel, was launched in June 2016 as a joint effort between DC Comics and Boom! Studios.
- Alan Moore's League of Extraordinary Gentlemen is littered with oblique references to events and characters in The Avengers, with three unnamed characters that are clearly Purdey, Tara and Emma appearing at the end of the book "Century: 2009".

=== Stage play ===
A stage adaptation was produced in Britain in 1971, written by TV series veterans Brian Clemens and Terence Feely, and directed by Leslie Phillips. It starred Simon Oates as Steed, Sue Lloyd as new partner Hannah Wild, and Kate O'Mara as villainess Madame Gerda. All three had guest roles in the original series.

A character named Hana Wilde (played by Charlotte Rampling) had essentially acted as Steed's partner in series five's "The Superlative Seven", an episode in which Emma Peel appears only briefly. According to John Peel in his overview of "The Superlative Seven", Charlotte Rampling was rumoured to be grooming up to replace Diana Rigg in this story, but nothing ever came of that".

=== Radio series ===
A radio series was transmitted between 6 December 1971 and 28 December 1973 on Springbok Radio, the English-language service of the South African Broadcasting Corporation (SABC); it was recorded at Sonovision Studios in Johannesburg, produced by Dave Gooden, the original TV scripts were adapted and directed by Tony Jay, for the first six months and Dennis Folbigge for the remainder. South Africa did not have national television until 1976. The episodes were adapted from both Emma Peel and Tara King episodes (with Tara changed to Emma Peel throughout). The Avengers were played by two British expatriate actors, Donald Monat as Steed and Diane Appleby as Mrs Peel, with Hugh Rouse as the tongue-in-cheek narrator. The stories were adapted into five-episode serials under Tony Jay and six- and seven-episode serials under Dennis Folbigge, of approximately 15 minutes each (including adverts) and stripped across the week, Monday-Friday, on Springbok Radio.

Currently only 19 complete serials survive, all from reel-to-reel off-air recordings made by John Wright in 1972. Also, the first three episodes of a remake of Escape in Time currently exist. Episodes 1 and 2 are copies from the original Sonovision tapes, and episode 3 is from an off-air recording, on audio cassette, made by Barbara Peterson; the rest of this serial is still missing. These episodes are also known to have been transmitted in New York on station WBAI on 99.5 FM, from 1977 to the early 1990s, and are currently being transmitted on Miami station WRGP on early Monday mornings.

Copies from the original off-air recordings have been restored by Alan and Alys Hayes, and can be heard at their "The Avengers Declassified" website and its sister website "Avengers on the Radio".

Many more serials were broadcast during its two-year run on South African radio; it is thought 83 serials were made and transmitted, but no other episodes are known to exist at present.

=== Film ===
Plans for a feature-length adaptation based upon the series circulated during the 1960s, 1980s and 1990s, with Mel Gibson at one point being considered a front-runner for the role of Steed. Ultimately, the 1998 film, starring Uma Thurman as Emma Peel and Ralph Fiennes as John Steed, with Sean Connery as the villain, received extremely negative reviews from critics and fans, and is a notorious commercial failure.

=== Audio ===
In June 2013, Big Finish Productions signed a license with StudioCanal to produce full-cast audio productions of 12 lost first-season episodes. The main cast includes Julian Wadham as Steed, Anthony Howell as Dr David Keel, and Lucy Briggs-Owen as Carol Wilson. The stories are adapted for audio by John Dorney.

In January 2014, Volume One, containing the first four stories, ("Hot Snow", "Brought to Book", "Square Root of Evil" and "One for the Mortuary") was released. Volume Two, containing the next four stories, ("Ashes of Roses", "Please Don't Feed the Animals", "The Radioactive Man" and "Dance with Death") was released in July 2014. Volume Three, containing the next four stories, was released in January 2015.

In March 2014, Big Finish extended the audio recreation programme to include all 26 season one episodes, including the then-two extant stories. A total of seven boxed sets were released.

=== Proposed reboots ===
In a 2023 interview, Charlie Higson said he and Paul Whitehouse had been offered an opportunity to helm a new series, but had declined.

On 18 January 2024, it was announced that Mickey Down and Konrad Kay were developing a reboot for StudioCanal.

== See also ==
- Avengerland, a variant of Metro-land

== Bibliography ==
- The Avengers by Dave Rogers (ITV Books in association with Michael Joseph Ltd., 1983)
- The Avengers Anew by Dave Rogers (Michael Joseph Ltd., 1985)
- The Complete Avengers by Dave Rogers (Boxtree Ltd., in Great Britain, 1989; St. Martin's Press, in America, 1989)
- The Ultimate Avengers by Dave Rogers (Boxtree Ltd., in Great Britain, 1995)
- The Avengers and Me by Patrick Macnee and Dave Rogers (New York: TV Books, 1997).
- The Avengers Companion by Alain Carrazé and Jean-Luc Putheaud, with Alex J. Gearns (Bay Books, 1998)
- The Avengers Dossier: The Definitive Unauthorised Guide by Paul Cornell, Martin Day and Keith Topping (London: Virgin Books, 1998)
- The Avengers: A Celebration: 50 Years of a Television Classic by Marcus Hearn (London: Titan Books, 2010)
- Bowler Hats and Kinky Boots: The Unofficial and Unauthorised Guide to the Avengers by Michael Richardson (London: Telos Publishing Ltd, 2014)
- Two Against the Underworld: The Collected Unauthorised Guide to The Avengers Series 1 by Alan Hayes, Richard McGinlay, Alys Hayes (London: Hidden Tiger, 2017)
- Quite, Quite Fantastic! The Avengers for Modern Viewers by Michael Scott Phillips (Atlanta: GR|OWL Books, 2018).
