= Linda Thorson =

Canadian actress (born 1947)

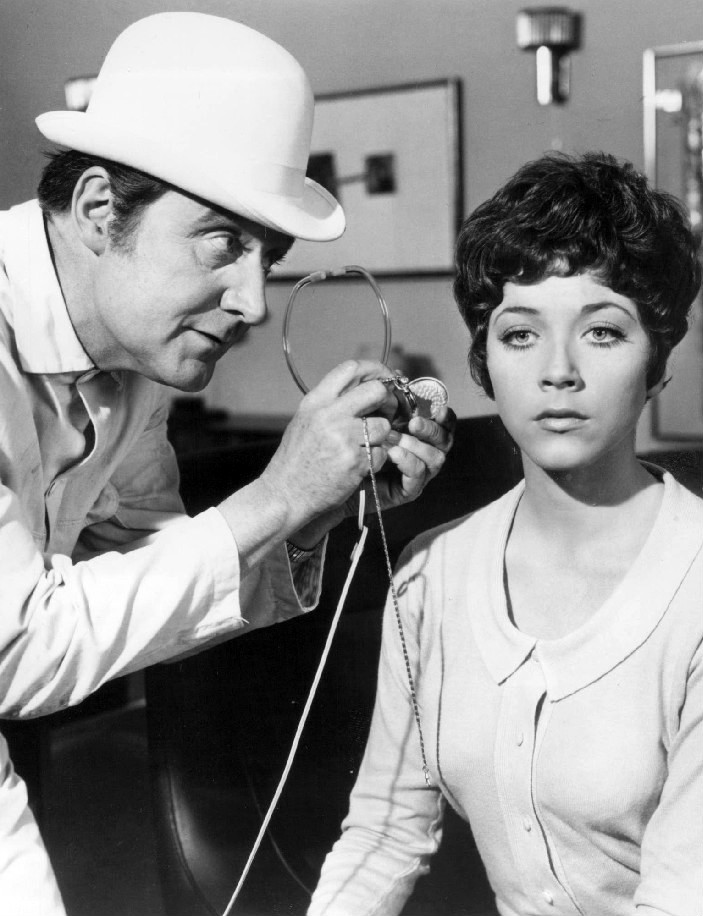
- Thorson with Patrick Macnee in a promotional photograph from The Avengers
- Born: Linda Robinson; June 18, 1947 (age 79); Toronto, Ontario, Canada
- Education: Royal Academy of Dramatic Art
- Occupation: Actress
- Years active: 1968–present
- Known for: Tara King in The Avengers
- Spouses: Barry Bergthorson (m. 1964; div. 1970) Cyril Jeffrey Smith Jr. (m. 1979; div. 1981) Bill Boggs (m. 1984; div. 2003) (1 child) Gavin Mitchell (m. 2005; div. 2011)
- Website: lindathorson.com

Linda Thorson (born Linda Robinson; June 18, 1947) is a Canadian actress best known for playing Tara King in The Avengers (1968–69).

== Early life ==
Born in Toronto, Ontario, Canada, Linda Robinson attended Bishop Strachan School, and then moved to England in 1965 to study acting. She graduated from the Royal Academy of Dramatic Art with an Honours Diploma, including speaking and singing honours (soprano), on July 1, 1967. Her professional name is the final part of Bergthorson, the surname of her first husband Barry Bergthorson (married 1964 divorced 1970).

== Career ==
Thorson is best known for her role as Tara King (succeeding Diana Rigg as Emma Peel) in the last series of the British TV adventure series, The Avengers, with the original star Patrick Macnee. She was reunited with Macnee in a commercial for Laurent-Perrier champagne in the mid 1970s, which led to the series reappearing as The New Avengers, although Thorson did not reprise her role.

Since then, Thorson appeared in character roles in many TV series and films, including Thriller, Return of the Saint, Valentino, The Greek Tycoon, the cult horror film Curtains, Blind Justice, Alan Alda's Sweet Liberty, and Marblehead Manor.

Thorson appeared from 1989 to 1992 in the daytime drama One Life to Live as Julia Wheaton Medina. She also appeared in Star Trek: The Next Generation, playing female Cardassian starship commander Gul Ocett in the 6th-season episode "The Chase" (1993). From 1998 to 2000, she played Isabel in the Canadian series Emily of New Moon.

In 2002, Thorson portrayed a Supreme Court Justice in the movie Half Past Dead with Steven Seagal and Ja Rule, and appeared in the 2006 action sequel Max Havoc: Ring of Fire. Throughout 2006–07, Thorson played the villainous Rosemary King in the ITV series Emmerdale.

Thorson has performed in many dramatic and musical stage productions, including appearances on Broadway in Nell Dunn's Steaming and Michael Frayn's Noises Off!. In 1971, she starred alongside Michael Crawford and Anthony Valentine in the London West End hit show No Sex Please, We're British and later appeared as Titania in A Midsummer Night's Dream at the Open Air Theatre, Regents Park, London. She also played Hester Salomon in a UK tour of Equus opposite Simon Callow. In the summer of 2008, she appeared at the Open Air Theatre, Regent's Park in the Lerner & Loewe musical, Gigi.

In 2013, Thorson appeared onstage in Tracy Letts's play August: Osage County about a dysfunctional family in Oklahoma. In 2014, she was slated to appear in Jon Robin Baitz's play Other Desert Cities.

In 2013, Thorson produced a new stage play called The Goodbye Bird written by Colleen Murphy.

== Personal life ==
Thorson married Cyril Jeffrey Smith Jr. in 1979; they divorced two years later.

Thorson was married in 1984 to the American news anchorman and producer Bill Boggs with whom she has a son; they are divorced. She was married to production designer Gavin Mitchell in November 2005, but divorced in 2011.

== Filmography ==
=== Film ===
Year	Title	Role	Notes
1977	Valentino	Billie Streeter	
1978	The Greek Tycoon	Angela	
1983	Curtains	Brooke Parsons	
1985	Walls of Glass	Andrea	
1986	Joey	Principal O'Neill	
1986	Sweet Liberty	Grace James	
1988	Olympus Force	Athene	
1999	Giving It Up	Marlene Gigante	
1999	The Other Sister	Drew	
2002	Half Past Dead	Judge Jane McPherson	
2004	Touch of Pink	Giles' Mother	
2004	Straight into Darkness	Maria	
2006	Max Havoc: Ring of Fire	Denise Blaine	
2011	Man on the Train	Sister	
2016	The Second Time Around	Katherine	Co-lead
2022	Lion Versus the Little People	Gayle Bennet	

=== Television ===
Year	Title	Role	Notes
1968–69	The Avengers	Tara King	Regular role; series six
1973	Thriller	Toni Tanner	Episode: "Lady Killer"
1976	The Howerd Confessions	Eve	Episode: "1.5"
1977	A Month in the Country	Vera Alexandrovna	TV film
1977	King of Kensington	Suzanne	Episode: "The Teacher"
1978	Les palmiers du métropolitain	Anna	TV film
1978	Return of the Saint	Diamond	Episode: "The Roman Torch"
1979	The Great Detective	Sarah Lyall	Episode: "Murder at Blenheim Swamp"
1980	Matt and Jenny	Ann Winfield	Episode: "Wagon Train West"
1981	The Two of Us	Melissa	Episode: "Upstairs, Downstairs"
1981	McClain's Law	Teri Fields	Episode: "Portrait of a Playmate"
1982	The Great Detective	Sarah Lyall	Episode: "Death on Delivery"
1984	The Lost Honor of Kathryn Beck	Cory Fuhrman	TV film
1985	Lime Street	Uli	Episode: "Diamonds Aren't Forever"
1985	St. Elsewhere	Mrs. Cochrane	3 episodes
1986	The Equalizer	Industrial Spy	Episode: "No Conscience"
1986	Blind Justice	Pamela	TV film
1986	Spenser: For Hire	Karen Cooper	Episode: "Hell Hath No Fury"
1986	Moonlighting	Agent Gregory	Episode: "Symphony in Knocked Flat"
1987	Dynasty	Dr. Mansfield	2 episodes
1987	Tales from the Darkside	Elizabeth Eaton	Episode: "Auld Acquaintances"
1987	The Bronx Zoo	Connie Delvecchio	3 episodes
1987–88	Marblehead Manor	Hillary Stonehill	Main role
1988	Buck James	Laura Browne	Episode: "Act of Aggression"
1989	Empty Nest	Janice Brattle	Episode: "The More Things Change..."
1989–92	One Life to Live	Julia Medina	Regular role
1990	Monsters	Jessica	Episode: "A New Woman"
1993	Tropical Heat	Janet	Episode: "The Last of the Magnificent"
1993	Star Trek: The Next Generation	Gul Ocett	Episode: "The Chase"
1994	Street Legal	Ellen Filipchuk	Episode: "The Morning After"
1994	E.N.G.	Barbara Stollery	Episode: "Before the Axe"
1994	Kung Fu: The Legend Continues	Helen Richmond	Episode: "Laurie's Friend"
1996	Kung Fu: The Legend Continues	Geena Sinclair	Episode: "Requiem"
1997	Dead Silence	Constance Stanley	TV film
1997	F/X: The Series	Cassandra Delarossa	Episode: "Medea"
1998–99	Emily of New Moon	Isabel Murray	Regular role
1999–00	The Hoop Life	Emily Yeager	Main role
2001	Law & Order	Martha Taylor	Episode: "Possession"
2006	Vital Signs	Mrs. Percy	Episode: "1.6"
2006	Silent Witness	Anne Wheaton	Episode: "Body of Work: Parts 1 & 2"
2006	The Wives He Forgot	Eva	TV film
2006–07	Emmerdale	Rosemary King	Regular role
2008	Doctors	Carol Francis	Episode: "Another Day"
2011	Committed	Isadora	TV film
2011	Flashpoint	Elaine Stearns	Episode: "Through a Glass Darkly"
2012	The Listener	Mrs. Slatterly	Episode: "Rogues' Gallery"
2012	Saving Hope	Melissa Hurst	"Out of Sight"
2012	Sylvia Plath: Girl Detective	Olive	TV series
2013	Rookie Blue	Eleanor Ward	Episode: "For Better, for Worse"
2014	Transporter: The Series	Rae Henson	Episode: "Sixteen Hands"
2014	Best Christmas Party Ever	Petra	TV film
2015	Two Wrongs	Judy	TV film
2018	Free Rein	Wilma	2 episodes
2018	New Amsterdam	Mrs. Monaghan	Episode: "Boundaries"
2019	Schitt's Creek	Gloria Gregson	Episode: "Meet the Parents"
2019	Good Witch	Mrs Hansen	Episode: "The Graduation"
2020	Little Birds	Gladys Savage	Episode: #1.1
2020–23	The Hardy Boys	Gloria Estabrook	19 episodes
2021	The Vows We Keep	Simone	TV film
2025	Father Brown	Gladys Carpenter	Episode: "The Deserving Poor"
