= Raymond Adamson =

English actor (1920–2002)

Raymond John Adamson (7 July 1920 – 25 March 2002) was a British actor often on television.

Born in Beckenham, then in Kent, he made his TV debut in 1956, playing a constable in David Copperfield. He became typecast playing policemen or lawmen, also playing policeman in series such as Oliver Twist (1962), Out of This World (1962), Dixon of Dock Green (1964), The Baron (1966), and New Scotland Yard (1972) and he also played a senator in Bergerac in the early 1980s. Other appearances include The Saint (1966), The Avengers (in the episodes The Decapod (1962), The Grandeur That Was Rome (1963), The Avengers (1969)), Randall and Hopkirk (Deceased) (in the episode Murder Ain't What it Used to Be) (1969), Within These Walls (1974–5) and the short film The Orchard End Murder (1980). His final appearance was as an auction porter in Seen a Ghost (1997).

== Filmography ==
| Year | Title | Role | Notes |
|---|---|---|---|
| 1958 | Heart of a Child | Hans Heiss | |
| 1958 | The Man Inside | Police Inspector | Uncredited |
| 1963 | Echo of Diana | George | |
| 1966 | A Man for All Seasons | | Uncredited |
| 1967 | It! | Second Officer | |
| 1969 | A Touch of Love | | Uncredited |
| 1981 | The Orchard End Murder | Mr. Wickstead | |
| 1995 | Blue Juice | Smuggler FM's Gordon | |
