= Alexandra Bastedo =

British actress (1946–2014)

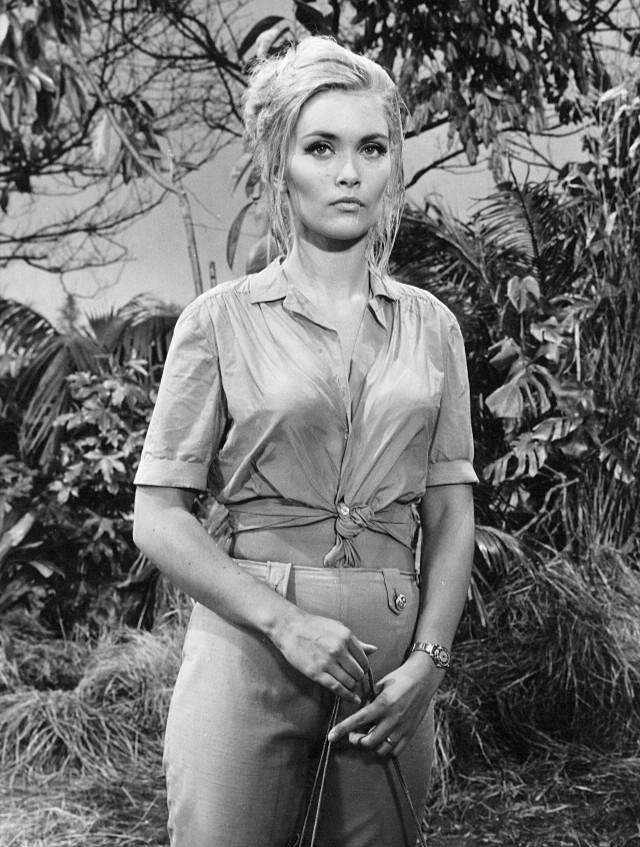
- Bastedo in The Champions, 1968
- Born: Alexandra Lendon Bastedo; 9 March 1946; Hove, Sussex, England
- Died: 12 January 2014 (aged 67); Worthing, England
- Occupations: Actress and writer
- Years active: 1962–2014
- Spouse: Patrick Garland (m. 1980; died 2013)

Alexandra Lendon Bastedo (9 March 1946 – 12 January 2014) was a British actress, best known for playing the secret agent Sharron Macready in the 1968 British espionage/science fiction adventure series The Champions. Bastedo was a vegetarian and animal welfare advocate and wrote several books on both subjects.

== Early life ==
Bastedo was born in Hove, England. Her mother (Liberiana Dorina Rescagliova,1917–2001) was of French, German and Italian descent, while her Canadian-born father (Gilbert Lendon Bastedo,1915–1985) was of Spanish, Dutch, Scottish and native American extraction. She attended Brighton and Hove High School and Brighton School of Drama.

== Professional career ==
Bastedo made her film debut as one of the title characters in William Castle's poorly received 13 Frightened Girls (1963). She gained attention on the European continent, earning her the nickname "La Bastedo". One of her first appearances was in the 1966 film Doctor in Clover, where she appears as a young nurse dancing with Sir Lancelot at a party (a non-speaking role).

Although most familiar to viewers of 1960s TV as Sharron Macready in The Champions, she was also known for her language skills, speaking Italian, Spanish, French and German. This ability brought her to the attention of 10 Downing Street, where she was employed to assist with translations, and landed her the role of co-presenter of Miss World competitions with Peter Marshall in the 1980s.

In 1979, she played in the TV drama series The Aphrodite Inheritance. In 1988, Bastedo was the cover star for Rank, a live album by British band The Smiths that charted at number 2 on the UK Albums Chart. In 1992, she appeared in "Fat", the second broadcast episode of Absolutely Fabulous, playing a 1960s model associate of Edina and Patsy. She was seen in two episodes of The Saint, alongside Roger Moore, and in one episode of the 1969 series Randall and Hopkirk (Deceased).

In 2006, Bastedo reunited with her co-stars from The Champions to provide commentaries and an interview for a DVD release of the show. Still working as an actress, she appeared in Batman Begins and toured theatres in 2006 with a production of Beyond Reasonable Doubt by Jeffrey Archer alongside Leslie Grantham and Simon Ward. In 2008, she joined the cast of the TV soap opera EastEnders, playing Cynthia. In January 2008, she was the co-presenter (with Ed Stewart) of "The Magic of Mantovani" at Lighthouse, Poole. The success of this concert led, the following year, to a concert by the Mantovani Orchestra at the same venue, which she again co-presented.

== Personal life ==
Bastedo dated David Frost and Omar Sharif, but turned down the advances of Steve McQueen, who, she recalled, propositioned her with the line, "My wife doesn't understand me." In the case of Sharif, the liaison lasted only a few weeks because of Sharif's bridge-playing, his odd hours and the fact that he took telephone numbers from other women.

Mike Tomkies, the Fleet Street journalist who abandoned the life of a celebrity reporter to live alone in the wilderness, lived with her for a while in Canada. They talked of marriage, but a contract for The Champions (1968 to 1969) prohibited her from marrying. He said that she was the "most stunningly beautiful creature" he had ever seen.

In 1980, at Chichester Cathedral, Bastedo married Patrick Garland, a director, writer and actor; he became a long-serving director of the Chichester Festival Theatre. Bastedo wrote a memoir, Beware Dobermanns, Donkeys and Ducks, as well as several books on caring for cats and dogs. Her husband died on 19 April 2013.

=== Animal welfare ===
Bastedo was a vegetarian and the founder of Alexandra Bastedo Champions (ABC) Animal Sanctuary. In an interview for the BBC television series Where Are They Now?, Bastedo provided a glimpse into her private life. She had been the president of her local RSPCA branch but gave up her position in 2008, to dedicate more time to her animal sanctuary at her home in West Chiltington, West Sussex. A journalist who interviewed her husband in 2010 described their domestic surroundings:

[W]e sit in his Sussex garden looking towards a small lake with a jetty and a battered rowing boat – a perfect pastoral scene which could be a stage set. He lives with his wife, the actress Alexandra Bastedo, who remains startlingly beautiful, a couple of Dobermans, some territorial cats, and a menagerie of horses, donkeys, pigs and goats – Bastedo runs an animal sanctuary. Garland's domain is largely inside the house where he closes doors to keep animals out of rooms lined with 12,000 books.

She was also a patron to a number of animal welfare organisations including Compassion in World Farming, Wildlife Aid Foundation, National Animal Welfare Trust, Greyhounds in Need and Naturewatch.

== Death ==
Bastedo died of breast cancer on 12 January 2014, aged 67, in a hospital in Worthing, England. She was buried next to her husband, Patrick Garland, in St Mary's churchyard, Sullington, West Sussex. The service was conducted by her friend and Rector, Revd Derek Spencer, who had also conducted the funeral of her husband only the previous year.

== Bibliography ==
- Alexandra Bastedo, Beware Dobermanns, Donkeys and Ducks (Parkwest: Robson Books, 1998) ISBN 9780860519737
- Alexandra Bastedo and Jeannie Kemnitzer, Canine Care and Cuisine: The Healthy Dog Book (Parkwest: Robson Books, 2000) ISBN 9781861051189
- Alexandra Bastedo and Jeannie Kemnitzer, The Healthy Cat Book: Feline Care and Cuisine (Parkwest: Robson Books, 2000) ISBN 9781861051783

== Filmography ==
- 13 Frightened Girls (aka The Candy Web) (1963) – Alex
- The Liquidator (1965) – Radio Operator (uncredited)
- Doctor in Clover (1966) – Nurse at Party (uncredited)
- That Riviera Touch (1966) – Girl at Roulette Table
- Casino Royale (1967) – Meg
- Wedding Night (1970) – Gloria – Girlfriend
- My Lover, My Son (1970) – Cicely Clarkson
- This, That and the Other (1970) – Angie
- The Kashmiri Run (1970) – Henrietta Fleming
- The Blood Spattered Bride (1972) – Mircalla Karstein
- I Hate My Body (1974) – Leda Schmidt
- The Ghoul (1975) – Angela
- El Clan de los Nazarenos (1975) – Arima
- Tu dios y mi infierno (1976) – Liselotte
- Find the Lady (1976) – Victoria
- The Man Inside (1976, TV movie) – Joan Lytton
- La Gioconda está triste (1977)
- El Mirón (1977) – Elena – wife
- Cabo de vara (1978) – Lola
- Stigma (1980) – Anna
- A Choice of Two (1981)
- Draw! (1984, TV movie) – Bess, Harry's Girlfriend in Bell City / member of acting troupe
- La veritat oculta (1987) – Agnes / Chiromancer
- The Byzantine Cat (2002) – Barbara
- Batman Begins (2005) – Gotham Society Dame

== Television ==
- The Count of Monte Cristo (TV series, 1964) – Renée de Saint-Méran
- The Saint (episode "The Crime of the Century", 1965) – Joan Vendel
- The Scales of Justice (episode "The Haunted Man", 1966) – Laura
- The Wednesday Play (1966) (TV) – The Girl
- The Saint (episode "The Counterfeit Countess", 1967) – Mireille
- The Champions (TV series, 1968–1969) – Sharron Macready
- Call My Bluff as herself, 4 episodes (1969–1975)
- Randall and Hopkirk (Deceased) (episode "Whoever Heard of a Ghost Dying?", 1969) – Carol Latimer
- Department S (episode "The Man Who Got a New Face", 1969) - Nicole
- Codename (1970) (TV series) – Diana Dalzell
- From a Bird's Eye View (episode "Sicilian Affair", 1970) – Lisa Vespucci
- Men of Affairs (episode "To Russia With...", 1973) – Emma Fry
- The Starlost (TV series, 1973), episode 10 "The Alien Oro" - Idona
- The Aphrodite Inheritance (miniseries, 1979) – Helene
- Magnolia Blossom by Agatha Christie, 1982 – Clare Hamilton
- Legend of the Champions (TV, 1983) – Sharron Macready
- Boon (episode "Peacemaker", 1988) – Greta Van De Murge
- Absolutely Fabulous (episode "Fat", 1992) – Penny Caspar-Morse
- EastEnders (2008–2009) – Cynthia (final television appearance)

== Radio ==
- Halloween Party by Agatha Christie, BBC Radio 1993
- Five Little Pigs by Agatha Christie, BBC Radio 1994
- Elephants Can Remember by Agatha Christie, dramatised by Michael Bakewell, BBC Radio 2006
