= Jailbreak (disambiguation) =

A jailbreak, jailbreaking, gaolbreak or gaolbreaking is a prison escape.

Jailbreak or gaolbreak may also refer to:

== Computing ==
- Jailbreak (computer science), overcoming deliberate limitations in a computer system:
  - iOS jailbreaking, overriding software limitations on the iPhone, iPod Touch, or iPad
  - Hackintosh, Apple's Macintosh operating system macOS running on unauthorized computer hardware
  - Rooting (Android), on Android phones and tablets
  - PlayStation 3 Jailbreak, on the Sony PlayStation such as a developer firmware to override all system holdbacks
  - Prompt injection in AI text models

== Arts, entertainment, and media ==
=== Music ===
- '74 Jailbreak, a 1984 album by AC/DC
- "Jailbreak" (AC/DC song), a 1976 song by AC/DC
- Jailbreak (album), a 1976 album by Thin Lizzy
  - "Jailbreak" (Thin Lizzy song), the title track of the Thin Lizzy album

=== Film ===
- Gaol Break, a 1936 British film directed by Ralph Ince
- Gaolbreak, a 1962 British film directed by Francis Searle
- Jailbreak (1936 film), starring Barton MacLane and June Travis
- Gunning for Vengeance, a 1946 film in the Durango Kid Western series, released as Jail Break in the United Kingdom
- A cavallo della tigre, a 1961 Italian comedy-drama film, released as Jailbreak in the United Kingdom
- Jail Breakers (Japanese: 脱走遊戯, romanized: Dasso yugi), a 1976 Japanese action film starring Sonny Chiba
- Jailbreak (2017 film), a Cambodian action film
- Jailbreakers, a 1994 television film, starring Shannen Doherty and Antonio Sabàto Jr.
- The Jail Break, a 1946 Terrytoons short film with Mighty Mouse
- Kaatru Veliyidai (Tamil: காற்று வெளியிடை), a.k.a. Qaidi: The Jail Break, a 2017 Indian Tamil-language film by Mani Ratnam

=== Television ===
- Jailbreak (TV series), a 2000 British reality series presented by Craig Charles
- "Jailbreak", a 1953 episode of My Hero (American)
- "Jailbreak", a 1958 episode of Fury (American)
- "Jailbreak", a 1958 episode of Man Without a Gun
- "The Jailbreaker", a 1957 episode of Sergeant Preston of the Yukon
- "The Jailbreak", a 1958 episode of Trackdown
- "Jailbreak", a 1958 episode of The Invisible Man (1958)
- "Jail Break", a 1960 episode of Four Feather Falls
- "The Jailbreakers", a 1961 episode of Laramie
- "The Jail Breakers", a 1961 episode of Tales of the Wizard of Oz
- "Jailbreak", a 1962 episode of Lawman
- "Jail Break", a 1962 episode of Supercar
- "Jailbreak", a 1962 episode of The Andy Griffith Show
- "Jail Break", a 1962 episode of Z-Cars
- "Jailbreak", a 1965 episode of The Legend of Jesse James
- "Jail Break-In", a 1965 episode of Ricochet Rabbit & Droop-a-Long
- "Jailbreak", a 1976 episode of Bronk
- "Junior and the Jail Break", a 1993 episode of Problem Child
- "Jailbreak", a 2010 episode of Undercovers
- "Jail Break", a 2012 episode of Femme Fatales
- "Jail Break" (Steven Universe), a 2015 episode of Steven Universe
- "Jail Break", a 2016 episode of In the Cut
- "Jailbreak...", a 2022 episode of JoJo's Bizarre Adventure: Stone Ocean
- "Jail Break", a 2023 episode of Hudson & Rex
- "Jailbreak", a 2023 episode of My Dad the Bounty Hunter

=== Video games ===
- Jailbreak (Roblox experience), a 2017 cops and robbers video game on Roblox
- Jailbreak: Source, a 2007 multiplayer computer game modification of the Source game engine
- Jail Break (video game), a 1985 arcade game by Konami

=== Other ===
- Jailbreak (webcomic), part of MS Paint Adventures
- A program on Australian community radio station 2SER

== Other uses ==
- Jailbreak, a variant of the game Tag

== See also ==
- Prison Break (disambiguation)
