= Clive Mantle filmography =

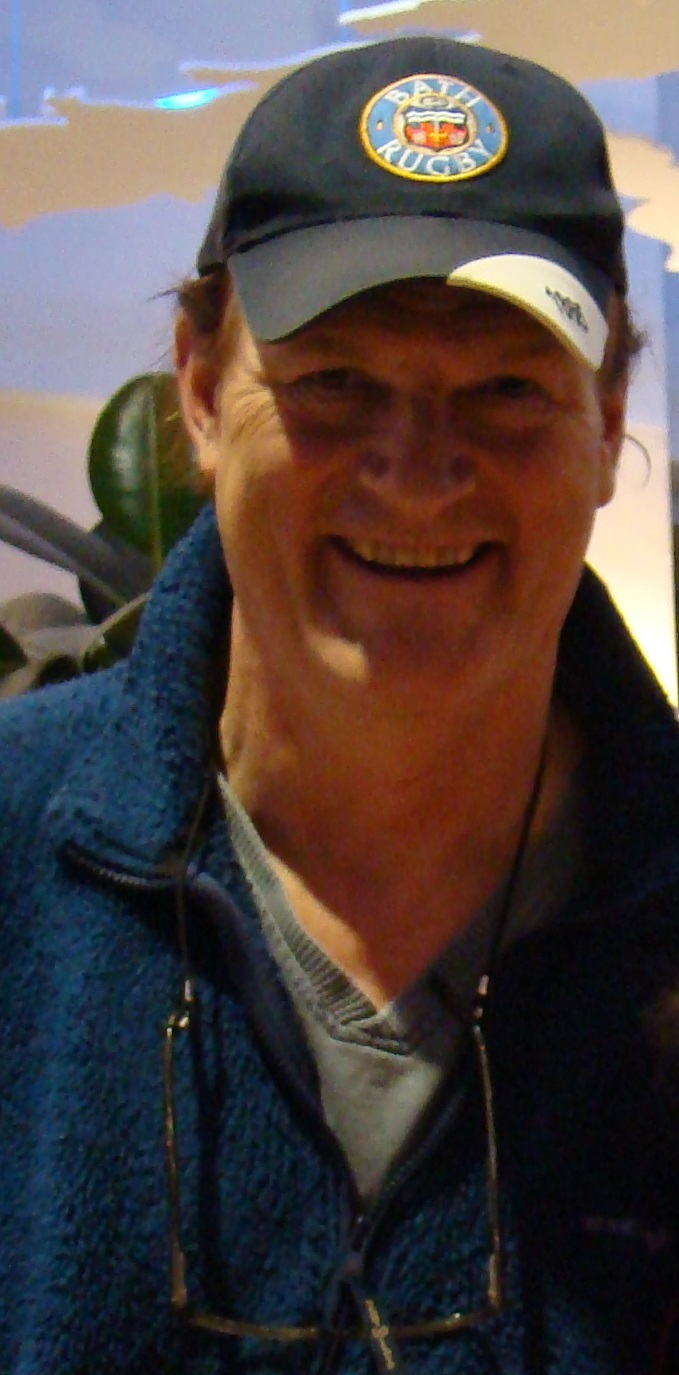
Mantle in 2010

Clive Mantle (born 3 June 1957) is an English actor. He came to prominence for his role as Little John in the 1980s fantasy series Robin of Sherwood; he played the role of Dr Mike Barrett in the BBC hospital drama series Casualty and Holby City in the 1990s.

== Television ==
Television appearances of Clive Mantle
Programme	Date	Channel	Role	Notes
The Orchard End Murder	3 January 1981	ITV	Ewen	
Robin of Sherwood	9 March – 26 May 1985	ITV	Little John	Series one; two-hour special, leading into a six programme series
Screen Two: "Hard Travelling"	30 March 1986	BBC One	Edward	
Robin of Sherwood	9 March – 13 April 1985	ITV	Little John	Series two; seven programme series
Robin of Sherwood	5 April – 28 June 1986	ITV	Little John	Series three; thirteen programme series
Dempsey and Makepeace: "Extreme Prejudice"	27 September 1986	ITV	"Big Ben" Davis	Series three; ten programme series
Lenny Henry Tonite: "What a Country"	2 October 1986	BBC Television	Cast member	
Hello Mum	23 February 1987	BBC Television	Cast member	
Scoop	26 April 1987	ITV	Cuthbert	
Alas Sage and Onion	1988		Cast member	
Play on One: "Airbase"	1 March 1988	BBC Television	Cast member	
Shelley: "For Whom The Bell Tolls"	21 November 1989	ITV	Policeman	
Chelmsford 123: "Bird Trouble"	23 January 1990	Channel 4	Vulcan	
One Foot in the Grave: "The Return of the Speckled Band"	8 February 1990	BBC One	Electricity man	
Bottom: "Smells"	17 September 1991	BBC Two	Husband	
Boon: "Trial and Error"	8 October 1991	ITV	Eric Wetherby	
WYSIWYG	6 July 1992	ITV	Globyool	
Casualty	23 January 1993 – 16 November 1996	BBC One	Mike Barrett	
The Good Sex Guide	31 October & 14 November 1994	ITV	On-screen participant	
This Morning	1 March 1995	ITV	On-screen participant	
Surprise, Surprise	23 April 1995	ITV	On-screen participant	
This Is Your Life	25 October 1995	ITV	Subject	
Scene: "Alison"	9 October 1996	BBC Two	Jonah	
Bloomin' Marvellous	8 September 1997 – 27 October 1997	BBC One	Jack	Eight episodes
Animal People: The Story of Little Lion	10 September 1997	BBC One	Narrator	
The Vicar of Dibley	22 January 1998	BBC One	Simon Horton	
Casualty	21 & 28 February 1998, 27 August 2016	BBC One	Mike Barrett	Guest role: 1998, 2016
The Jack Docherty Show	5 May 1998	Channel 5	On-screen participant	
The Full Motty	5 June 1998	BBC One	On-screen participant	
Holby City	1999 – 2001	BBC One	Mike Barrett	
Open House with Gloria Hunniford	25 May 2001	Channel 5	On-screen Participant	
Heartbeat	6 January 2002	ITV	Vinny Sanders	
Stars and Their Lives: Derek Fowlds	3 June 2002	ITV	On-screen participant	
Emergency	5 July – 9 August 2002	ITV	Narrator	
Today with Des and Mel	3 April 2003	ITV	On-screen participant	
The Afternoon Play	29 September 2004	BBC One	Steve McGrath	
Airport Story	6 January 2005	ITV	Narrator	
The Robinsons	9 June 2005	BBC Two	Gavin	
This Morning	16 & 23 August 2005	ITV	Interviewee	
After Thomas	26 December 2006	ITV	John Havers	
Game of Thrones	2011	HBO	Greatjon Umber	One series
Sherlock: "The Hounds of Baskerville"	8 January 2012	BBC One	Dr Frankland	
Thomas & Friends	2014	Channel 5	Gator	Three episodes
Jonathan Strange & Mr Norrell	2015	BBC One	Dr Greysteel	
Still Open All Hours	2018	BBC One	Mr Roper	
Doctors	2020	BBC One	Mr Brook	Episode: "A Day in the Life..."

== Filmography ==
Filmography of Clive Mantle
Film	Year	Role
Party Party	1983	Bobby
Foreign Body	1986	Tough character on bus
Superman IV: The Quest for Peace	1987	1st Nuclear Man (scenes deleted)
The Mini Sagas: The Nihilist's Double Vision	1987	Irate man
Without a Clue	1988	1st thug
White Hunter Black Heart	1990	Harry
Alien 3	1992	William
The Darkest Light	1999	Ministry vet
The Poseidon Adventure	2005	James Martin
Into the Storm	2009	Thompson
Tale of the Brave	2014	Gator
The More You Ignore Me	2018	Dunk
