= Dance with Death =

Dance with Death may refer to:

- "Dance with Death" (The Avengers), an episode of the television series The Avengers
- Dance with Death (film), a 1992 film
- Dance with Death (album), a 1980 album by jazz pianist Andrew Hill
