= Mystery Submarine (1963 film) =

British war film by C.M. Pennington-Richards

- Directed by: C. M. Pennington-Richards
- Screenplay by: Hugh Woodhouse; Bertram Ostrer; Jon Manchip White
- Based on: Mystery Submarine (play) by Jon Manchip White
- Produced by: Bertram Ostrer
- Starring: Edward Judd; James Robertson Justice; Laurence Payne
- Cinematography: Stanley Pavey
- Edited by: Bill Lewthwaite
- Music by: Clifton Parker
- Production company: Bertram Ostrer Productions
- Distributed by: British Lion Films; Universal-International (US)
- Release date: 1963 (UK)
- Running time: 92 minutes
- Country: United Kingdom
- Language: English

Mystery Submarine is a 1963 British war film directed by C. M. Pennington-Richards and starring Edward Judd, James Robertson Justice and Laurence Payne. The screenplay was by Hugh Woodhouse and Bertram Ostrer based on the play of the same name by Jon Manchip White.

A captured German submarine is used by the Royal Navy to trick a German force aiming to intercept a supply convoy.

== Plot ==
U-153 is damaged during air attack in the Atlantic, and its crew abandon ship to escape chlorine gas now leaking from its battery cells. Her commanding officer is overcome by fumes before he can jettison the ship's papers. Due to the intelligence windfall that this represents, the submarine is taken by a British prize crew to be examined and inspected (in much the same manner that befell the real German U-boat later renamed HMS Graph).

It is not long before British intelligence suggest a new use for the submarine as a Trojan Horse. A picked crew of volunteers led by Commander Tarlton take the U-153 back to war, to intercept and disable a German Wolf-pack; in this they succeed, even sinking the Wolf-pack leader in their subsequent escape.

Her mission accomplished, the U-153 is attacked and sunk by a British frigate whose crew is oblivious to the submarine's mission or identity. Commander Tarlton orders his men to abandon ship, getting his crew off intact before she goes down. Their rescuers are astonished to learn that not only are the men they recover from the sea all British, but by attacking they have just sunk one of 'His Majesty's submarines...'

== Cast ==
- Edward Judd as Lieutenant Commander Tarlton
- James Robertson Justice as Rear Admiral Rainbird
- Laurence Payne as Lieutenant Seaton
- Joachim Fuchsberger as Commander Scheffler
- Arthur O'Sullivan as Mike Fitzgerald
- Albert Lieven as Captain Neymarck
- Robert Flemyng as Vice Admiral Sir James Carver
- Richard Carpenter as Lieutenant Haskins
- Richard Thorp as Lieutenant Chatterton
- Jeremy Hawk as Admiral Saintsbury
- Robert Brown as Coxswain Drage
- Frederick Jaeger as Lieutenant Hence
- George Mikell as Lieutenant Remer
- Peter Myers as Telegraphist Packshaw
- Leslie Randall as Leading Seaman Donnithorne
- Ewen Solon as Lieutenant Commander Kirklees
- Nigel Green as Chief Lovejoy

== Reception ==
The Monthly Film Bulletin wrote: "The film is more or less competent of its extremely hackneyed kind, tolerably acted by Edward Judd and Joachim Fuchsberger. C. M. Pennington-Richards' direction is blandly anonymous."
