= List of Supercar episodes =

This is an episode guide for the Gerry Anderson television series Supercar, made for the British production company ITC Entertainment and first broadcast between 1961 and 1962 on ATV London. Episodes are listed in original ATV London broadcast order. All episodes were made in black and white.

== Series One (1961) ==
No. overall	No. in series	Title	Directed by	Written by	Original air date	Prod. code
1	1	"Rescue"	Gerry Anderson	Martin & Hugh Woodhouse	28 January 1961	1
Pilot Bill Gibson and his younger brother Jimmy, along with their pet chimpanzee, Mitch, find themselves stranded at sea following the crash of their aircraft, Falcon 25. With Navy rescue out of the question due to heavy fog, the opportunity arises for Mike Mercury to give Supercar a test run.
2	2	"False Alarm"	Alan Pattillo	Martin & Hugh Woodhouse	4 February 1961	4
A plan devised by Masterspy and Friend Zarin to steal Supercar fails when Mitch uses the remote control to take the thieves on a chaotic ride through the skies.
3	3	"The Talisman of Sargon"	David Elliott	Martin & Hugh Woodhouse	11 February 1961	3
Masterspy plans to steal an ancient jewel.
4	4	"What Goes Up"	David Elliott	Martin & Hugh Woodhouse	18 February 1961	5
When a military operation dubbed 'Operation: 4th of July' fails, Supercar has to blow up a balloon carrying a dangerous load of rocket fuel.
5	5	"Amazonian Adventure"	Alan Pattillo	Martin & Hugh Woodhouse	25 February 1961	2
Dr. Beaker and Mike are taken prisoner by a tribe of headhunters while searching for a plant to cure an illness affecting Mitch.
6	6	"Grounded"	David Elliott	Martin & Hugh Woodhouse	4 March 1961	7
Supercar takes to the road to catch a thief.
7	7	"Keep it Cool"	Alan Pattillo	Martin & Hugh Woodhouse	11 March 1961	6
Masterspy steals Supercar's fuel, but overlooks the fact it has to be refrigerated.
8	8	"Jungle Hazard"	Alan Pattillo	Martin & Hugh Woodhouse	18 March 1961	8
Masterspy tries to cheat Dr. Beaker's cousin out of a plantation.
9	9	"High Tension"	David Elliott	Martin & Hugh Woodhouse	25 March 1961	9
Masterspy kidnaps Dr. Beaker and demands Supercar as ransom.
10	10	"Island Incident"	David Elliott	Martin & Hugh Woodhouse	1 April 1961	10
The deposed leader of Pelota enlists Supercar's help to bring peace
11	11	"Ice-Fall"	Desmond Saunders	Martin & Hugh Woodhouse	8 April 1961	12
Dr. Beaker is trapped in a cave.
12	12	"Phantom Piper"	Alan Pattillo	Martin & Hugh Woodhouse	15 April 1961	14
Supercar flies to Scotland to investigate a 'Phantom Piper'.
13	13	"Pirate Plunder"	David Elliott	Martin & Hugh Woodhouse	22 April 1961	16
The Supercar crew sets a trap for a modern-day raider of the high seas
14	14	"A Little Art"	Alan Pattillo	Martin & Hugh Woodhouse	29 April 1961	11
Mike and Dr. Beaker try to find a forger's plates- if an art dealer and a criminal do not find the plates first.
15	15	"Flight of Fancy"	Alan Pattillo	Gerry & Sylvia Anderson	6 May 1961	17
Jimmy dreams of using Supercar to save a princess.
16	16	"Deep Seven"	Desmond Saunders	Martin & Hugh Woodhouse	13 May 1961	15
Supercar is trapped underwater in a mine.
17	17	"Hostage"	Desmond Saunders	Martin & Hugh Woodhouse	20 May 1961	18
The two-bit criminals Judd and Harper hold Mike captive
18	18	"The Sunken Temple"	David Elliott	Martin & Hugh Woodhouse	27 May 1961	19
Spyros, the bandit, tries to keep Supercar from discovering his submerged secret.
19	19	"The Lost City"	Alan Pattillo	Gerry & Sylvia Anderson	3 June 1961	23
Supercar is diverted to the Amazon by a Professor Watkins, who intends to launch a flying atomic bomb targeting Washington.
20	20	"Trapped in the Depths"	Alan Pattillo	Martin & Hugh Woodhouse	10 June 1961	20
A bathyscaphe is trapped in the deepest point in the Pacific.
21	21	"The Dragon of Ho Meng"	David Elliott	Martin & Hugh Woodhouse	17 June 1961	22
Supercar is flying in a typhoon, so Mike decides to land on an island near the Chinese border.
22	22	"The Magic Carpet"	Desmond Saunders	Martin & Hugh Woodhouse	24 June 1961	24
Mike and the crew thwart a nefarious plan to steal the throne of a remote Asian nation.
23	23	"Supercar "Take One""	Desmond Saunders	Martin & Hugh Woodhouse	1 July 1961	26
Dr. Beaker films Supercar in action, and receives illegal footage of secret organisations.
24	24	"Crash Landing"	Desmond Saunders	Gerry & Sylvia Anderson	8 July 1961	21
Mitch gets a girlfriend when engine trouble forces Supercar down in the jungle.
25	25	"The Tracking of Masterspy"	David Elliott	Martin & Hugh Woodhouse	15 July 1961	13
Masterspy steals the plans for Supercar, but he does not keep them for long.
26	26	"The White Line"	Alan Pattillo	Martin & Hugh Woodhouse	6 August 1961	25
Supercar heads to London to help Scotland Yard solve a series of bank robberies.

== Series Two (1962) ==
No. overall	No. in series	Title	Directed by	Written by	Original air date	Prod. code
27	1	"The Runaway Train"	David Elliott	Gerry & Sylvia Anderson	4 February 1962	1
Masterspy sabotages a prototype atomic-powered diesel train on its journey from London to Brighton in England in a bid to assassinate a VIP passenger. Dr Beaker and the rest of the Supercar team have been invited to drive the train, but will they be able to stop the sabotaged engine before the vehicle crashes into a station at the end of the line?
28	2	"Precious Cargo"	Alan Pattillo	Gerry & Sylvia Anderson	11 February 1962	2
A little French girl escapes her tyrannical guardian in a crate of wine bound for Black Rock.
29	3	"Operation Superstork"	Desmond Saunders	Gerry & Sylvia Anderson	18 February 1962	3
Mitch sets a balloon (with Mike, Jimmy and Beaker on board) adrift.
30	4	"Hi-Jack"	Bill Harris	Gerry & Sylvia Anderson	25 February 1962	4
A Boeing 707 is hijacked – with Dr. Beaker, Jimmy, and Bill trapped in it.
31	5	"Calling Charlie Queen"	Alan Pattillo	Gerry & Sylvia Anderson	4 March 1962	5
Mike and Dr. Beaker are the first victims of a madman with a bizarre plan.
32	6	"Space for Mitch"	Desmond Saunders	Gerry & Sylvia Anderson	11 March 1962	6
Mitch launches a space capsule- with him in it.
33	7	"Atomic Witch Hunt"	Desmond Saunders	Gerry & Sylvia Anderson	18 March 1962	9
The Supercar team stops a gang that has planted nuclear bombs across the country
34	8	"70-B-Lo"	Alan Pattillo	Gerry & Sylvia Anderson	25 March 1962	8
Professor Popkiss comes down with appendicitis. After the operation, Mike has to fly to the Arctic to get the closest blood donor who has Professor Popkiss's blood type.
35	9	"The Sky's the Limit"	Bill Harris	Gerry & Sylvia Anderson	1 April 1962	7
Masterspy storms Black Rock in an attempt to steal Supercar, which disappears.
36	10	"Jail Break"	Bill Harris	Gerry & Sylvia Anderson	8 April 1962	10
Dr. Beaker saves the day when Mike is forced to help a notorious criminal escape prison.
37	11	"The Day that Time Stood Still"	Alan Pattillo	Gerry & Sylvia Anderson	15 April 1962	11
An alien drops by on Mike's birthday.
38	12	"Transatlantic Cable"	Desmond Saunders	Gerry & Sylvia Anderson	22 April 1962	12
Masterspy and Zarin tap a telephone cable that runs across the Atlantic.
39	13	"King Kool"	Bill Harris	Gerry & Sylvia Anderson	29 April 1962	13
Mitch switches places with a musical gorilla.
