= Supercar (TV series) =

British children's science fiction TV series (1961–1962)

- Genre: Children's science fiction
- Created by: Gerry Anderson & Reg Hill
- Written by: Gerry & Sylvia Anderson; Martin & Hugh Woodhouse
- Directed by: Gerry Anderson; David Elliott; Bill Harris; Alan Pattillo; Desmond Saunders
- Voices of: David Graham; George Murcell; Graydon Gould; Sylvia Anderson; Cyril Shaps
- Music by: Barry Gray; Uncredited: Edwin Astley
- Opening theme: "Supercar", performed by Mike Sammes (Series 1) / The Mike Sammes Singers (Series 2)
- Country of origin: United Kingdom
- Original language: English
- No. of series: 2
- No. of episodes: 39 (list of episodes)

Production
- Producer: Gerry Anderson
- Cinematography: John Read
- Editors: Gordon Davie; Bill Harris; John Kelly
- Running time: 25 minutes
- Production company: AP Films
- Budget: £2,000 per episode

Original release
- Network: ITV
- Release: 28 January 1961 – 29 April 1962

Supercar is a British children's science fiction television series produced by Gerry Anderson and Arthur Provis' AP Films (APF) for Associated Television and ITC Entertainment. Two series totalling 39 episodes were filmed between September 1960 and January 1962. Budgeted at £2,000 per episode, it was Anderson's first half-hour series, as well as his first science fiction production.

The series uses Supermarionation puppetry and scale model special effects. Anderson would later claim that the whole point of having a series based on a vehicle was to minimise having to show the marionettes walking, an action which he felt never looked convincing. Though the series' creation was credited to Gerry Anderson and Reg Hill, it also incorporates elements of Beaker's Bureau, an unmade series that scriptwriter Hugh Woodhouse had pitched to the BBC. The music was composed and conducted by Barry Gray. For the first series, the opening and closing theme song vocalist was Mike Sammes; for the second series, Sammes' vocal group The Mike Sammes Singers re-recorded the theme.

In the UK, the series premiered on 28 January 1961 in the London area and was later shown on other regional franchises of the ITV network. It was repeated in various regions until 1968, and again by Granada Television between 1971 and 1973. In Canada, it aired on CBC, and in the U.S. in syndication (the first Anderson series to be shown overseas), debuting in 1962. It eventually aired in more than 40 countries.

The series is available on DVD in the United Kingdom, Australia, and North America, where it has been issued twice. It was released on Blu-ray in 2021, its 60th anniversary year.

== Premise ==
The star of the series was Supercar, a multi-environment craft invented by Professor Rudolph Popkiss and Doctor Horatio Beaker, and piloted by Mike Mercury. Airbreathing jet engines and retractable wings in the rear allowed it to fly like a vertical-takeoff-and-landing aeroplane; retrorockets on the side slowed it. On land it rode on a cushion of air rather than wheels. Non-airbreathing rocket engines allowed it to travel underwater like a submarine and fly in outer space. Its navigation system contained "Clear-Vu" to allow the pilot to see through fog and smoke. It was housed in and supported from a laboratory at Black Rock, Nevada.

In the first episode, "Rescue", the Supercar's mission is to save passengers of a downed private plane. Two of the rescued, young Jimmy Gibson and his pet monkey Mitch, are invited to live at the facility and share in subsequent adventures.

The series inaugurated what became an Anderson trademark: the launch sequence. With the exception of The Secret Service, all of his series until Terrahawks included these – in Supercar's case, the charging and firing of port and starboard engines, the activation of an interlock, the opening of (overhead) hangar doors, and finally the vertical take-off.

== Characters ==
=== Protagonists ===
- Mike Mercury: test pilot of Supercar; voiced by Graydon Gould
- Professor Rudolph Popkiss: co-inventor of Supercar; voiced by George Murcell in series 1 and Cyril Shaps in series 2
- Doctor Horatio Beaker: co-inventor of Supercar; voiced by David Graham.
- Jimmy Gibson: kid brother of Mike's pilot friend Bill Gibson, saved by Mike in episode 1; voiced by Sylvia Anderson
- Mitch: Jimmy's pet monkey; voiced by David Graham.

=== Recurring villains ===
- Masterspy and Zarin: a foreign spy and his henchman, who are obsessed with stealing Supercar. Masterspy was voiced by George Murcell in series 1 and Cyril Shaps in series 2; Zarin was voiced by David Graham in both series. According to John Peel, the duo are "very reminiscent" of Sydney Greenstreet and Peter Lorre as Gutman and Cairo in The Maltese Falcon.
- Mr Harper: a posh English criminal; voiced by George Murcell.
- Ben Judd: a lower-class Cockney criminal; voiced by David Graham.

=== Other recurring characters ===
- Bill Gibson: Jimmy's elder brother, Mike Mercury's pilot friend who owns a shipping business; voiced by David Graham
- Felicity Beaker: Doctor Beaker's cousin, who owns an estate in Malaysia; voiced by Sylvia Anderson

== Production ==
After Granada Television declined to order a second series of Four Feather Falls, its creator Gerry Anderson approached Lew Grade of ATV with the idea for Supercar. Anderson proposed a budget of £3,000 per episode, which Grade demanded be cut in half. After working through the night, Anderson returned the next morning with the budget reduced by only a third. However, Grade still commissioned the series.

Anderson always claimed that he invented a futuristic vehicle as an excuse to reduce the amount of walking the marionettes had to do, which could never be made to look realistic. This was taken to its conclusion in Captain Scarlet and the Mysterons, in which the marionette puppets are almost never seen walking.

Scriptwriter brothers Hugh and Martin Woodhouse devised supporting characters Dr Beaker, Masterspy and Zarin to expand on Anderson's original concept, which featured only Mike Mercury, Jimmy and Mitch. Before partnering with Anderson, the Woodhouses had been developing their own series about the Beaker character under the working title Beaker's Bureau. The brothers wrote one complete "shooting (camera-ready) script" per week to accommodate Anderson's (and Grade's) cost and production schedule.

Mike Mercury flying Supercar in the opening title sequence.

There were several working models of Supercar, which was designed by art director Reg Hill. The larger "hero" model was about seven feet (2.1 m) long and cost £1,000 to build. Made of lightweight wood and Perspex, it was constructed by Laurie Barr of Aeronautical and General Modelmakers (now Mastermodels). A mid-sized model, around one metre (3 ft 3 in) long and sculpted by Slough craftsman Bill James, as well as a smaller model, about 0.5 metres (1 ft 8 in), were used for the titles. One of the smaller models, used in distance shots, was about nine inches (23 cm) in length and was also sculpted by Bill James. John Peel likens Supercar's appearance to that of the 1959 Cadillac Fleetwood Sixty.

=== Voice casting ===
The cast for Supercar was put together weeks before shooting was to commence. The lines were recorded in the rushes theatre, which was transformed into a recording studio. Lines were recorded on a Sunday once a month, because the studio was on a trading estate, meaning that Sundays were the quietest days of the week. The recording sessions typically took place between 9:30 a.m. and 5:30 p.m., during which time the cast, along with the sound engineers, would try to work through at least three scripts.

Despite never auditioning for the series, Canadian actor Robert Graydon Gould (The Forest Rangers) was hired as the voice of Mike Mercury. At the time of his casting, the 23-year-old had been working in radio and television plays. In an interview, Gould recalled that because he had no car, travelling to Slough to record dialogue was difficult because "Sunday transport is about half of what it normally is"; however, as he had a wife, a two-year-old child and a three-bedroom apartment, he was grateful for the money. Voice director Sylvia Anderson (credited as Sylvia Thamm on series 1) helped Gould with his accent. As Gould remembered: "She would point out when my Canadian accent was slipping through".

David Graham voiced three characters for the series: Doctor Beaker, Zarin, and Mitch the Monkey. He also voiced recurring character Bill Gibson. He had previously worked on the series Four Feather Falls where he had shown his ability to provide a variety of different voices. Graham based his voice for Dr Beaker on veteran actor Felix Aylmer. He also spent a day at London Zoo watching monkeys, trying get a good interpretation as to how Mitch should sound.

George Murcell voiced Professor Popkiss and Masterspy for the first series. He had previously worked for AP Films when playing the character Diamond in the low-budget B-Movie Crossroads to Crime alongside David Graham. Graham believes that because of his voice quality, Gerry Anderson thought he would make a good Masterspy, while Gould remembers Murcell doing "all the European voices". Murcell left the series after 24 episodes, and as such Popkiss does not appear in the last two episodes of the first series.

Sylvia Anderson voiced Jimmy Gibson and all the female characters. However she did not receive a cast credit for the first series. Originally Sylvia was not to voice Jimmy, but she was given the opportunity when Gerry was not happy with the original voice of Jimmy that had already been recorded. This marked Sylvia's first involvement in voice acting.

=== Filming ===
Principal photography on the first 26 episodes began in September 1960, with the production filming at a rate of one episode every two weeks. By the end of December, 13 episodes had been completed; the 26th was finished in April 1961. During production, Gerry Anderson and Sylvia Thamm married. After a brief midday wedding, the couple returned to the studio to help complete the opening title sequence.

The series' scale model aerial photography effects were created by filming the miniatures in front of rear-projected footage of a cloud-filled sky, shot from an Airspeed Oxford flying at 16,000 feet (4,900 m). This marked APF's first use of rear-projection effects. Background footage for driving scenes was filmed on the M1 motorway. The shots of Supercar entering and exiting the sea were filmed on a shallow outdoor pool. The dive shot was achieved by splicing the footage of the model with a splash from a rock. To film the exit, the crew yanked the submerged model out of the water on a fishing line.

Other effects scenes were filmed using miniature models or painted backdrops. To create underwater sequences, a thin aquarium containing tiny fish was placed between the camera and the set; as the Supercar model was flown across the set on wires, the underwater effect was completed by connecting an air-line to the aquarium to produce bubble jets, and splashing the water to scatter the studio lighting and simulate refracted sunlight. Model sets featuring vegetation used cuttings from real trees for greater realism.

=== Series 2 ===
After Grade ordered a further 13 episodes, filming on a second production block began in October 1961. For this second block, production time was shortened by splitting the crew into two units and filming episodes in pairs based on overlapping schedules, allowing two episodes to be completed in as many weeks. It also saw the introduction of a dedicated special effects unit (led by Derek Meddings and Brian Johnson).

With the departure of Murcell, Cyril Shaps was brought in to voice Professor Popkiss and Masterspy. David Graham was a friend of Shaps and suggested him for the part. At the time Shaps was performing in the West End play The Tenth Man, which Graham and the Andersons went to see.

Regarded as "Series 2" of Supercar, the final 13 episodes were the first APF productions to be credited as "Filmed in Supermarionation". Production ended in December 1961.

== U.S. syndication ==
Supercar debuted in the U.S. on WPIX, a local station in New York City, on Saturday 6 January 1962 at 6:30 p.m. The station's EVP and general manager, Fred M. Thrower, reported to ITC that after four weeks the show "has solidly established itself as the number one program in its time period and the number one weekend children's show in New York among all local children shows in this market" with an average ARB rating of 15.2. Sales revenue after eight weeks was $750,000.

By autumn 1962, more than 100 American stations were airing the series. By the following January, Supercar had been sold into 140 U.S. and 49 foreign markets for $1.9 million in total sales, guaranteeing production of a second series of shows.

== Reception ==
According to Robert Sellers, while 21st-century audiences may find the series "tame and a little infantile" compared to APF's later work, Supercar is sustained by good writing, characterisation and production design. Paul Cornell, Martin Day and Keith Topping regard Mike Mercury as the template for later protagonists, writing that his "square-jawed, mid-Atlantic" bearing made him the "prototypical" Gerry Anderson hero.

Rating the series 8 out of 10, Rick Sanchez of IGN praises the writing and characters. However, he considers the plots "a bit formulaic" from a modern perspective, and suggests that recurring villain Masterspy is overused.

In a review for DVD Talk, Glenn Erickson gave the series the highest rating of "Excellent", praising its puppet sets, scale model work, special effects and "razor-sharp" cinematography. He wrote that the production values were of a kind which "simply weren't seen in 1960 [sic] children's programming, which made this peppy half-hour programme a sure bet for syndication." He also commented that the inclusion of Mitch the Monkey as an anthropomorphic character was a welcome departure from other children's shows, which typically focused on "Lassie-like genius animals".

By contrast, Matt Hinrichs of DVD Talk rated the series two out of five, describing it as a "primitive precursor to Stingray, Thunderbirds and Captain Scarlet", and best skipped. Calling the production standards "modest", he wrote that much of the series was "repetitive, snail-paced and unimaginative", also arguing that it had "too many awkward components [...] to meld into a satisfying whole". He believed that although the changes between production blocks made the second series superior to the first, ultimately they only turned "a crude, boring time-waster into something that was merely passable".

Noting aspects such as the lack of female regular characters, Marcus Hearn describes Supercar as being "squarely aimed at little boys of the Meccano era". Hearn also writes that the series' over-arching "rescue theme", as well as its "fetishisation" of technology, make it comparable to APF's later science fiction productions.

Jonathan Bignell writes that as in Thunderbirds, the villains appear to operate "outside geopolitical conflict", although Masterspy and Zarin and the plot of the episode "Island Incident" carry echoes of the Cold War. Bignell also notes that the heroes are a multinational "British, European and American team".

== Comic book ==
In the UK, comics based on the series appeared in TV Comic from 1961 to 1964, running from issue No. 483 (18 March 1961) until issue No. 667 (26 September 1964). These stories were drawn by Harold Tamblyn-Watts and Bill Mevin. Further Supercar comics were published in TV Century 21, from 23 January 1965 to 8 January 1966, drawn by Bruno Marraffa.

Supercar was the first Gerry Anderson series to be adapted as a comic book in America, with the Gold Key company releasing four issues between November 1962 and August 1963.

Misc!Mayhem Productions in the U.S. planned to release a five-issue Supercar licensed comic book mini-series "picking up where the classic Gerry Anderson TV series left off". Only the first issue (Vol. 1. No.0) appeared in February 2003.

== Soundtrack ==
In 1998, Fanderson issued a limited-edition album of Barry Gray's music from the series, paired with his work on Fireball XL5. It was the first soundtrack album produced by the society.

In 2013, the society released a second limited-edition disc, this one completely devoted to the series.
