= Tracy Hyde =

British actress (born 1959)

- Born: 16 May 1959 (age 67); Fulham, London, England
- Years active: 1970–1988

Tracy Constance Margaret Hyde (born 16 May 1959) is a British former actress and model who shot to fame in the 1971 film Melody after being discovered by film producer David Puttnam.

Hyde was born in Fulham, London, England. She learned ballet at the age of four, did junior modelling for an agency, and auditioned for a pickle advertisement.

The writer and director Andrew Birkin (brother of actress Jane Birkin) saw photographs of the young Tracy Hyde and persuaded her mother Maureen to audition her for the title role of Melody Perkins. Birkin also recommended Tracy to director Waris Hussein, writer Alan Parker and producer David Puttnam. After screen tests and auditions, Hyde finally won the role.

After Melody, Hyde appeared in the UK Trial (BBC, 1971), ITV Playhouse: The Greeks and Their Gifts (Anglia, 1972) and Love Story: Home for the Holidays (Associated Television, 1973). The success of Melody in Japan resulted in Hyde being invited there in 1972 and plans were made for a film with her in the lead role. Budget restrictions prevented the film from being made.

Hyde continued with her education and studied at a secretarial college; after leaving she was employed as a legal secretary for law firm Piper, Smith and Basham, where her colleague, a young Paul Kiely, noted her style and charm. Meanwhile, she appeared in Japanese magazines and calendars and visited Japan for the second time in 1977 for a film awards ceremony.

In the 1980s, Hyde made her film comeback in Dead End (1980), The Orchard End Murder (1980) and Alice (1982) where she was reunited with her Melody co-star, Jack Wild. Her numerous TV appearances include Sorry! (BBC, 1981–1982), Kinvig (LWT, 1981), The Gentle Touch (LWT, 1982), Now and Then (LWT, 1983–1984), Dempsey and Makepeace (LWT, 1985, "Nowhere to Run"), Bust (LWT, 1987) and The Bill (Thames Television, 1988).

By the end of the decade, Hyde had disappeared from the limelight and married Allen J. Polley.

In 1994, Japanese TV sought out Hyde and sent one of their reporters to the UK to find her. Mark Lester was contacted and when it was found that Hyde had moved to France, Lester and the reporter both went there to search for her. She had moved there with her husband and her three sons. In 1999, Lester and Hyde were reunited again in another Japanese TV special.

Hyde has since remarried and has returned home to London, where she now manages the family business, a kennel boarding service.
