= Christian Marnham =

British director

Christian Marnham is a director active in the 1970s and 1980s. In 1970 he filmed the short, The Showman. In 1980 he shot the short feature film The Orchard End Murder, which was screen debut of actor Clive Mantle. In 1985 he directed the episode "Hors de Combat" for the TV series Dempsey and Makepeace. In 1989 he directed Lethal Woman (The Most Dangerous Woman Alive).
