= The Little Wonders =

- The Avengers episode
- Episode no.: Season 3 Episode 16
- Directed by: Laurence Bourne
- Written by: Eric Paice
- Production code: 3619
- Original air date: 11 January 1964

Guest appearances
- Kenneth J. Warren; David Bauer; Lois Maxwell; Tony Steedman; Harry Landis

Episode chronology
← Previous "The White Elephant"	Next → "The Wringer"

"The Little Wonders" is the sixteenth episode of the third series of the 1960s cult British spy-fi television series The Avengers, starring Patrick Macnee and Honor Blackman. It was first broadcast by ABC on 11 January 1964. The episode was directed by Laurence Bourne and written by Eric Paice.

== Plot ==
Steed and Cathy infiltrate a crime syndicate whose members masquerade as members of the clergy.

== Cast ==
- Patrick Macnee as John Steed
- Honor Blackman as Cathy Gale
- Kenneth J. Warren as Fingers, a.k.a. The Frog, Vicar of Toowoomba
- David Bauer as Bishop of Winnipeg
- Lois Maxwell as Sister Johnson
- Tony Steedman as Dr. A.S. Beardmore
- Harry Landis as Harry, a.k.a. Archdeacon of Bangkok
- John Cowley as Big Sid, a.k.a. Dean of Rangoon
- Rosemarie Dunham as Gerda
- Frank Maher as Hasek
- Alex MacDonald as Porter
- Mark Heath as Coalman, a.k.a. Rev. Garfield Percival
- Christopher Robbie as Thug
- Rick Jones as Thug
