= The Gilded Cage (The Avengers) =

- The Avengers episode
- Episode no.: Season 3 Episode 7
- Directed by: Bill Bain
- Written by: Roger Marshall
- Production code: 3614
- Original air date: 9 November 1963

Guest appearances
- Patrick Magee; Edric Connor; Norman Chappell; Margo Cunningham; Alan Haywood

Episode chronology
← Previous "November Five"	Next → "Second Sight"

"The Gilded Cage" is the seventh episode of the third series of the 1960s cult British spy-fi television series The Avengers, starring Patrick Macnee and Honor Blackman. It was first broadcast by ABC on 9 November 1963. The episode was directed by Bill Bain and written by Roger Marshall.

== Plot ==
Steed and Cathy set out to snare criminal mastermind John P. Spagge using a gold bullion robbery as bait.

== Cast ==
- Patrick Macnee as John Steed
- Honor Blackman as Cathy Gale
- Patrick Magee as John P. Spagge
- Edric Connor as Abe Benham
- Norman Chappell as Fleming
- Margo Cunningham as Wardress
- Fredric Abbott as Manley
- Alan Haywood as Westwood
- Martin Friend as Hammond
- Terence Soall as Peterson
- Geoff L'Cise as Gruber
- Douglas Cummings as Fatso Barker
- Neil Wilson as Groves
