= The Golden Fleece (The Avengers) =

- The Avengers episode
- Episode no.: Season 3 Episode 11
- Directed by: Peter Hammond
- Written by: Roger Marshall; Phyllis Norman
- Production code: 3603
- Original air date: 7 December 1963

Guest appearances
- Warren Mitchell; Tenniel Evans; Barry Linehan; Robert Lee

Episode chronology
← Previous "The Grandeur That Was Rome"	Next → "Don't Look Behind You"

"The Golden Fleece" is the eleventh episode of the third series of the 1960s cult British spy-fi television series The Avengers, starring Patrick Macnee and Honor Blackman. It was first broadcast by ABC on 7 December 1963. The episode was directed by Peter Hammond and written by Roger Marshall and Phyllis Norman.

== Plot ==
Steed accidentally picks up the wrong coat when leaving a Chinese restaurant and discovers a cheque for £5,000 in the pocket. Further investigation reveals that the restaurant is being used as a front for illegal gold smuggling. An unexpected twist to the plot is that part of the proceeds is being used to assist needy ex-servicemen.

== Cast ==
- Patrick Macnee as John Steed
- Honor Blackman as Cathy Gale
- Warren Mitchell as Captain George Jason
- Tenniel Evans as Major Bob Ruse
- Barry Linehan as Sergeant Major Wright
- Robert Lee as Mr. Lo
- Barbara Yu Ling as Mrs. Kwan
- Lisa Peake as Esther Jones
- Ronald Wilson as Private Holmes
- Michael Hawkins as Corporal James Jones
