= Mollie Maureen =

Irish actress

- Mollie Maureen in Coronation Street 1969
- Born: 16 August 1904; Ireland
- Died: 26 January 1987 (aged 82); London, England
- Occupation: Actress

Mollie Maureen (16 August 1904 – 26 January 1987) was an Irish actress who worked mainly in Britain.

== Life and career ==
Maureen was born Elizabeth Mary Campfield in 1904 in Ireland. Her acting career began in 1939, wherein she acted in a film entitled A Ship in the Bay. Maureen mainly worked in television, with many minor and/or recurring roles in major shows such as Dr. Finlay's Casebook, Z-Cars, Open All Hours, Last of the Summer Wine and The Sweeney. She also appeared as an elderly lady in an episode of Hammer House of Mystery and Suspense. More prominently, from 1981 to 1983, she had various roles on the Kenny Everett Show. Other television appearances included playing Lady Glenmire in the 1972 version of Elizabeth Gaskell's Cranford, alongside Pat Coombs. She played Queen Victoria on two occasions on screen, one of them in The Private Life of Sherlock Holmes, the other in the mini-series The Edwardians. Her last film appearance was the role of the violently eccentric Mr. F's Aunt in Christine Edzard's two-part adaptation of Little Dorrit, co-starring Joan Greenwood, Max Wall and Alec Guinness.

She died in London, aged 82.

== Selected TV and filmography ==
- Little Dorrit as Mr. F's Aunt - 1987
- The Comic Strip Presents... (episode: Consuela, or, the New Mrs Saunders) as Mrs Tattle - 1986
- Travelling Man (episode: Hustler) - 1985
- Hammer House of Horror and Suspense (episode: The Corvini Inheritance) as an elderly lady - 1985
- Past Caring as Susan - 1985
- Angels (2 episodes) as Miss Draper - 1983
- Curse of the Pink Panther as Rich Old Lady - 1983
- The Wicked Lady as Doll Skelton - 1983
- The Kenny Everett Show (Various Roles) - 1981–1983
- Open All Hours (episode: The Cool Cocoa Tin Lid) as Old Woman - 1982
- The Setbacks (7 episodes) as Gran - 1981
- Great Expectations (3 episodes) as Sarah Pocket - 1981
- A Chance to Sit Down as Landlady - 1981
- Shoestring (episode: The Farmer had a Wife) as Mother Superior - 1980
- Oh Happy Band (episode: Let Bygones be Bygones) - 1980
- Born and Bred (episode: C'est si bon) as Mildred - 1980
- ITV Playhouse (episode: Hands) as Mrs Spinks - 1980
- All Creatures Great and Small (episode: Will to Live) as Alice Temple - 1980
- The Orchard End Murder as Old Lady at Station - 1980
- Play for Today (episode: Chance of a Lifetime) as Old Mrs. Gallagher - 1980
- Danger UXB (episode: Dead Man's Shoes) as Old Woman - 1979
- The Hound of the Baskervilles as Mrs Oviatt - 1978
- Spearhead (episode: Suspect) as Old Woman - 1978
- Jabberwocky as Head Nun (uncredited) - 1977
- Beryl's Lot as Mrs Pargeter - 1977
- Doctor on the Go (episode: I Love Paris... When I get there) as Sister Murphy - 1977
- Happy Ever After (episode: Old Folks' Party) as Mrs. Turner - 1976
- Angels (episode: Celebration) as Ellen - 1976
- The Return of the Pink Panther as Little Old Lady - 1975
- Crossroads as Granny Fraser - 1975
- The Sweeney (episode: The Placer) as the Old Woman - 1975
- The Venturers (episode: Gilt Edged) as Mrs. Norwood - 1975
- Z-Cars (episode: House to House) as Mrs. Best - 1974
- Callan as Old Lady in the Strand - 1974
- Last of the Summer Wine (episode: The New Mobile Trio) as Walter's Mother - 1973
- Crown Court (episode: No Smoke Without Fire Part 1) as Nellie Kent - 1973
- Armchair 30 (episode: Ross Evan's Story) as Old Lady - 1973
- Follyfoot (episode: The Distant Voice) as Mrs. Padgett - 1973
- Owen, M.D. (episode: The Witch of Addington) as Mrs. Gudle - 1973
- The Fenn Street Gang (episode: Is Anybody There?) as Lady in Church - 1973
- The Edwardians (episode: Daisy) as Queen Victoria - 1973
- Cranford (4 episodes) as Lady Glenmire - 1972
- Sykes (episode: Marriage) as Muriel - 1972
- Clochemerle (4 episodes) as Madame Lagousse - 1972
- Spyder's Web (episode: Romance on Wheels) as Mrs. Danvers - 1972
- Bachelor Father (episode: Gently Does it) as Great-Aunt Freda - 1971
- Public Eye (episode: Who Wants to Be Told Bad News?) as Miss Bain - 1971
- The Private Life of Sherlock Holmes as Queen Victoria - 1970
