= Prison break =

Prison Break is a 2005–2017 American TV serial drama

Prison break may refer to:

- Prison breakout, a prison escape

== Film and television ==
- Prison Break: The Final Break, a 2009 American TV film, part of the Prison Break TV franchise
- Prison Break (film), a 1938 American crime drama
- Prison Break (Amphibia), a 2019 episode of American animated TV series Amphibia

== See also ==
- Jailbreak (disambiguation)
