= The Medicine Men (The Avengers) =

- The Avengers episode
- Episode no.: Season 3 Episode 9
- Directed by: Kim Mills
- Written by: Malcolm Hulke
- Production code: 3615
- Original air date: 23 November 1963

Guest appearances
- Peter Barkworth; Newton Blick; Harold Innocent; Joy Wood; Monica Stevenson

Episode chronology
← Previous "Second Sight"	Next → "The Grandeur That Was Rome"

"The Medicine Men" is the ninth episode of the third series of the 1960s cult British spy-fi television series The Avengers, starring Patrick Macnee and Honor Blackman. It was first broadcast by ABC on 23 November 1963. The episode was directed by Kim Mills and written by Malcolm Hulke.

== Plot ==
Steed and Cathy investigate a conspiracy to flood the market with counterfeit medicines.

== Cast ==
- Patrick Macnee as John Steed
- Honor Blackman as Cathy Gale
- Peter Barkworth as Geoffrey Willis
- Newton Blick as John Willis
- Harold Innocent as Frank Leeson
- Joy Wood as Miss Dowell
- Monica Stevenson as Fay
- John Crocker as Taylor
- Peter Hughes as Edwards
- Brenda Cowling as Masseuse
