= Don't Look Behind You (The Avengers) =

- The Avengers episode
- Episode no.: Season 3 Episode 12
- Directed by: Peter Hammond
- Written by: Brian Clemens
- Production code: 3606
- Original air date: 14 December 1963

Guest appearances
- Maurice Good; Kenneth Colley; Janine Gray

Episode chronology
← Previous "The Golden Fleece"	Next → "Death a la Carte"

"Don't Look Behind You" is the twelfth episode of the third series of the 1960s cult British spy-fi television series The Avengers, starring Patrick Macnee and Honor Blackman. It was first broadcast by ABC on 14 December 1963. The episode was directed by Peter Hammond and written by Brian Clemens. It was remade with Emma Peel as episode 5–15, "The Joker".

== Plot ==
Cathy is invited to the stately home of Sir Cavalier Rasagne, only to find that she has been lured into a trap by Martin Goodman, a deluded criminal who believes that she broke his heart.

== Cast ==
- Patrick Macnee as John Steed
- Honor Blackman as Cathy Gale
- Maurice Good as Man, Martin Goodman
- Kenneth Colley as Young Man
- Janine Gray as Girl, Ola Monsey-Chamberlain
