= Charles Lloyd-Pack =

British actor (1902–1983)

Charles Lloyd Pack
- Born: Charles Lloyd Pack; 10 October 1902; Wapping, London, England
- Died: 22 December 1983 (aged 81); London, England
- Occupation: Actor
- Years active: 1936–1983
- Spouse: Ulrike Pulay (m. 1941)
- Children: 2, including Roger
- Relatives: Emily Lloyd (granddaughter)

Charles Lloyd-Pack (10 October 1902 – 22 December 1983) was a British film, television and stage actor.

== Life and career ==
Lloyd Pack was born in Wapping, East London, to working-class parents. He appeared in several horror films produced by Hammer Films, including Dracula, The Man Who Could Cheat Death, The Revenge of Frankenstein, The Terror of the Tongs and Quatermass 2, the film version of the 1955 BBC TV serial. In 1970 he appeared as Claud Nau at the Chichester Festival Theatre in Robert Bolt's play, Vivat! Vivat Regina!. His best known role was Professor Marks in the British television series Strange Report but he is also known from other television appearances in The Avengers, Man in a Suitcase, Danger Man, Randall & Hopkirk, The Adventures of Robin Hood, The Prisoner and the mini-series Jennie: Lady Randolph Churchill (1974).

== Personal life and death ==
Lloyd Pack married Viennese Jewish refugee Ulrike Elisabeth Pulay (25 April 1921 – 8 April 2000) in 1941. He is the father of actor Roger Lloyd-Pack. His grandchildren include actress Emily Lloyd.

Lloyd-Pack died aged 81, on 22 December 1983, in London.

== Filmography ==
=== Film ===
Year	Title	Role	Director	Notes
1936	The House of the Spaniard	Man in train	Reginald Denham	
1949	For Them That Trespass	Theatre Critic	Alberto Cavalcanti	Uncredited
1949	Man on the Run	Mr. Collins - Jeweller	Lawrence Huntington	Uncredited
1950	Last Holiday	Bank Cashier	Henry Cass	Uncredited
1951	High Treason	Percy Ward	Roy Boulting	
1952	Old Mother Riley Meets the Vampire	Sir Joshua Bing	John Gilling	
1952	I'm a Stranger	Mr. Cringle	Brock Williams	
1952	Gift Horse	Member of Board of Inquiry	Compton Bennett	
1953	Noose for a Lady	Robert Upcott	Wolf Rilla	
1954	River Beat	John Hendrick	Guy Green	
1954	Conflict of Wings	Bookie	John Eldridge	
1954	Aunt Clara	Simon's Doctor	Anthony Kimmins	Uncredited
1955	The Constant Husband	Solicitor	Sidney Gilliat	
1955	Track the Man Down	Gerry Palmer	R.G. Springsteen	Uncredited
1955	Value for Money	Mr. Gidbrook	Ken Annakin	
1955	All for Mary	Doctor	Wendy Toye	
1956	Yield to the Night aka Blonde Sinner	Mary's Lawyer	J. Lee Thompson	
1956	The Last Man to Hang?	Frognal	Terence Fisher	
1956	Loser Takes All	Sir Walter Blixon	Ken Annakin	Uncredited
1956	Three Men in a Boat	Mr Quilp	Ken Annakin	
1957	Alive on Saturday	Gorman	Alfred Travers	
1957	Doctor at Large		Ralph Thomas	Uncredited
1957	Interpol	English tourist	John Gilling	
1957	Stranger in Town	Captain Nash	George Pollock	
1957	Quatermass 2	Dawson	Val Guest	
1957	The Flesh Is Weak	Salvi	Don Chaffey	
1957	The Story of Esther Costello	Dr. Blake	David Miller	Uncredited
1957	The Scamp	Beamish	Wolf Rilla	
1957	Barnacle Bill	Tritton	Charles Frend	
1957	Night of the Demon	Chemist	Jacques Tourneur	
1957	Blue Murder at St Trinian's	Henry Roberts Prison Governor	Frank Launder	
1958	The Safecracker	Lambert	Ray Milland	
1958	Dracula	Dr. Seward	Terence Fisher	
1958	The Revenge of Frankenstein	President of the Medical Council	Terence Fisher	
1958	Further Up the Creek	El Diablo	Val Guest	
1958	Corridors of Blood	Hardcastle	Robert Day	
1959	The Man Who Could Cheat Death	Man at Private View	Terence Fisher	Uncredited
1959	Bobbikins	Stebbins	Robert Day	Uncredited
1959	Cover Girl Killer	Captain Adams	Terry Bishop	
1960	Cone of Silence	Commissioner No. 2	Charles Frend	
1960	The Day They Robbed the Bank of England	Mr. Peabody	John Guillermin	Uncredited
1960	Doctor Love	Hospital Dean	Ralph Thomas	Uncredited
1960	Circle of Deception	Ayres	Jack Lee	
1960	The Three Worlds of Gulliver	Makovan	Jack Sher	
1960	Trouble in the Sky	One of the Commissioners	No Name	
1961	The Terror of the Tongs	Dr. Fu Chao, tong member	Anthony Bushell	
1961	The Kitchen	Chef	James Hill	
1961	Victim	Henry	Basil Dearden	
1962	Only Two Can Play	Committee Member	Sidney Gilliat	Uncredited
1962	Crooks Anonymous	Fletcher	Ken Annakin	
1963	Siege of the Saxons	The Doctor	Nathan H. Juran	
1964	The Third Secret	Dermot McHenry	Charles Crichton	
1964	Every Day's a Holiday	Mr. Close	James Hill	
1965	Operation Crossbow	Technical Examiner	Michael Anderson	Uncredited
1966	The Reptile	The Vicar	John Gilling	
1967	The Shuttered Room	Barge Master	David Greene	
1967	Les grandes vacances		Jean Girault	
1967	Bedazzled	Vicar	Stanley Donen	
1967	Two a Penny	Reverend Allison	James F. Collier	
1968	Sebastian	Chess Player	David Greene	
1968	Diamonds for Breakfast	Butler	Christopher Morahan	
1968	If....	Classics Master	Lindsay Anderson	
1969	The Best House in London		Philip Saville	
1970	The Man Who Haunted Himself	Jameson	Basil Dearden	
1970	Song of Norway	Chevalier	Andrew L. Stone	Uncredited
1970	I Start Counting	Priest at School	David Greene	
1971	All the Right Noises	Stagedoor keeper	Gerry O'Hara	
1972	Madame Sin	Mr. Willoughby	David Greene	
1974	Frankenstein and the Monster from Hell	Prof Durendel	Terence Fisher	
1980	The Mirror Crack'd	Vicar	Guy Hamilton	

=== Television ===
Year	Title	Role	Notes
1955	Douglas Fairbanks Presents	Elmer J. Ellis	Episode: "The Leprechaun"
1955-1960	The Adventures of Robin Hood	Abbott/ Hugh/ Master Maurice/ Bishop of Nottingham	5 episodes
1956-1958	BBC Sunday Night Theatre	Various	4 episodes
1956	The Grove Family	Chemist	Episode: "For Want of Nourishment"
1957-1961	ITV Television Playhouse	Various	5 episodes
1958	Ivanhoe	Larry	Episode: "The Ransom"
1958	Charlesworth at Large	Arthur Baker	Episode: "Up the Garden Path"
1961	Deadline Midnight	Housham	Episode: "Striptease"
1961	Dixon of Dock Green	Ben Waterfield/Mr. Guard	2 episodes
1961	Sir Francis Drake	Daniel Peters	Episode: "The Lost Colony of Virginia"
1962	Edgar Wallace Mysteries	Miller	Episode: Flat Two
1964	Armchair Theatre	Merriman	Episode: The Importance of Being Earnest
1964-1966	Sergeant Cork	Sir George Pleydel/Lord Westworth	2 episodes
1965	Gideon's Way	Cyril Hunter	Episode: "How to Retire Without Really Working"
1965	Danger Man	First Secretary (uncredited)	Episode: "To Our Best Friend"
1965	The Sullavan Brothers	Goody	Episode: "The Gallows in my Garden"
1965-1968	The Avengers	Dr. Fawcett / Sir Manfred Fellows	2 episodes
1966	Theatre 625	Wilson	Episode: "Simon and Laura"
1967	The Prisoner	Artist	Episode: “It's Your Funeral”
1968	Man in a Suitcase	Sir Charles Grainger/Examining Magistrate	2 episodes
1969	Randall and Hopkirk (Deceased)	Cecil Purley	Episode: “Whoever Heard of a Ghost Dying?”
1972	Alcock and Gander	Roland	Episode: "Husband in a Hurry"
1976	Whodunnit?	Father Michael	Episode: "A Free Habit"
1976	Crown Court	Mr. Justice Robertson	Serial: "Stranger in the Night"
1979	BBC Television Shakespeare	Lord Sandys	Episode: Henry VIII
1979	The Omega Factor	Sir Willoughby	Episode: "Out of Body, Out of Mind"
1981	Bognor	Matthew	2 episodes
1981	The Other 'Arf	Vicar	Episode: "Holding the Baby"
