= Norman Chappell =

English actor (1925–1983)

- in The Avengers:The Gilded Cage (1963)
- Born: 31 December 1925; Lucknow, British India
- Died: 21 July 1983 (aged 57)
- Occupation: Character actor
- Known for: Light comedy

Norman Chappell (31 December 1925, Lucknow, India – 21 July 1983) was an English character actor, known for numerous roles in television and film.

== Biography ==
Born in India during the British Raj, Chappell appeared mainly in television series as a character actor, usually in light comedy roles.

He was best known for his roles in the Carry On films and in The Avengers (six appearances "Dead of Winter", "The Gilded Cage", "Dial A Deadly Number", "Dance with Death", "Fog" and "Murdersville"). He often portrayed slightly pompous types of which his role in "The Gilded Cage" was a good example. He also appeared in a number of comedy sketches performed in the early "3-2-1" TV shows hosted by Ted Rogers.

== Selected filmography ==
- The Day the Earth Caught Fire (1961) – Hotel receptionist (uncredited)
- Petticoat Pirates (1961) – Johnson
- The Pot Carriers (1962) – Prisoner Robert
- Jigsaw (1962) – Andy Roach
- The Punch and Judy Man (1963) – Footman
- Carry On Cabby (1963) – Allbright
- 80,000 Suspects (1963) – Welford (uncredited)
- Girl in the Headlines (1963) – Police photographer
- Comedy Workshop: Love and Maud Carver (1964) – Shoe salesman
- The Beauty Jungle (1964) – Talk of the Town stage manager (uncredited)
- Crooks in Cloisters (1964) – Benson
- Doctor in Clover (1966) – Flower delivery man (uncredited)
- How I Won the War (1967) – Soldier at Alamein
- The Mini-Affair (1967) – Theatre manager
- Journey to Midnight (1968) – Friar Tuck (episode 'Poor Butterfly')
- Toomorrow (1970) – Stage door keeper (uncredited)
- Carry On Loving (1970) – Mr. Thrush (scenes deleted)
- Carry On Henry (1971) – First plotter
- The Magnificent Six and 1/2: Up the Creek (1971)
- Au Pair Girls (1972) – Salesman
- Nearest and Dearest (1972) – Man on bus
- Some Mothers Do 'Ave 'Em (1973/1978) Crossing the Road and Phoning the Doctor/Wendy House – Mr. Faraday/Cyril
- Love Thy Neighbour (1973) – Indian conductor
- Percy's Progress (1974) – Valet (uncredited)
- The Four Musketeers (1974) – Submarine inventor
- Intimate Games (1976) – Principal
- Dangerous Davies – The Last Detective (TVM, 1980) - Parsons
- The Gaffer (TV series) (1982) - Patient ('Unfit as a Fiddle', episode)
