= Scottish Wildcat Association =

Animal charity based in the United Kingdom

The Scottish Wildcat Association was a charity founded in 2008 by filmmaker Steve Piper with the aims of conserving the Scottish wildcat, which is critically endangered in the UK. Threatened by hybridisation with feral domestic cats, recent estimates have suggested that only 35 pure Scottish wildcats exist in the wild, with no pure Scottish wildcats in captivity.

The charity raised awareness of the wildcat considerably through strong media engagement, and also used Piper's documentary film Last of the Scottish Wildcats to build interest in funding conservation action.

In 2008 the charity began to establish the first fieldwork project directly aimed at conserving the wildcat in Scotland in the West Highlands, calling it Wildcat Haven after a book by Mike Tomkies, patron and an Honourable Lifelong Member of the project.

The project was designed to include genetics research, field surveys, engagement with local communities, radio collaring, feline disease surveys and feral cat neutering and health checks. The association describes this approach as capitalizing on geographically modular conservation actions while being scalable.

The charity was wound down in 2018 by which time the Wildcat Haven project had been established as an independent CIC, dedicated to the fieldwork project. The CIC was publicly launched in 2014 with the announcement that the project had successfully removed feral cats from a remote 250 square miles (650 km^{2}) peninsula, Ardnamurchan, through a humane neutering methodology, and planned further expansion.
