= The Honeydogs =

Rock band from Minnesota

- Origin: Saint Paul, Minnesota, U.S.
- Genre: Indie
- Years active: 1994–present
- Labels: Mercury, United, Palm
- Members: Adam Levy; Noah Levy; Trent Norton; Brian Halverson; Peter J. Sands; Peter Anderson; Ryan Plewacki; Jeff Victor

The Honeydogs is a band from Saint Paul, Minnesota that opened at First Avenue in 1994.

== History ==
The band's popularity grew after signing with record label Mercury Records and their major label debut album release, Seen a Ghost in 1997. In June 1998 the band fired guitarist Tommy Borscheid. Two months later bass player Trent Norton had an almost fatal asthma attack and fell into a coma for three days.

The band left Mercury after the executives who signed them left the label when Mercury's parent PolyGram merged with Universal. The merger meant the band was on the new Island Def Jam label. It took seven months (August 1999 to March 2000) to leave IDJ. They signed with Palm Records in May 2000 to release their next album, Here's Luck.

== Film ==
Adam Levy and producer Rick Fuller worked together to make a film version of the album 10,000 Years which is a feature-length music video.

== Honors and awards ==
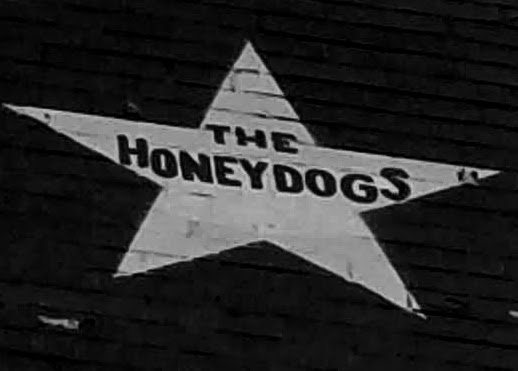
Star honoring the Honeydogs on the outside mural of the Minneapolis nightclub First Avenue

The Honeydogs were honored with a star on the outside mural of the Minneapolis nightclub First Avenue, recognizing performers which have played sold-out shows or have otherwise demonstrated a major contribution to the culture at the iconic venue. Receiving a star "might be the most prestigious public honor an artist can receive in Minneapolis," according to journalist Steve Marsh.

== Members ==
- Adam Levy, singer-songwriter, guitars, piano, keyboards
- Noah Levy, drums, percussion, vocals
- Trent Norton, bass, vocals
- Brian Halverson, guitars, vocals
- Jeff Victor, piano, keyboards, organ
- Peter J. Sands, piano, keyboards, organ
- Matt Darling, trombone
- Steve Kung, trumpet
- Peter Anderson, drums, percussion
- Ryan Plewacki, guitars, vocals
- John Fields, producer

== Discography ==
=== Albums ===
- The Honeydogs, 1995
- Everything, I Bet You, 1996 (released 12 March 1996, on October/TRG)
- Seen a Ghost, 1997 (released 26 August 1997, on Mercury)
- Here's Luck, 2000
- Island of Misfits, 2001
- 10,000 Years, 2003
- Amygdala, 2006
- Can't Feel the Beating, 2008
- Sunshine Committee, 2009
- What Comes After, 2012
- Love & Cannibalism, 2016
- "Everything, I Bet You", 2023 vinyl release (Feeling Minnesota Records)
- "Algebra for Broken Hearts", 2025

=== Other recordings ===
- Minneapolis Does Denver, 'Back Home Again', 'October Records' 'TRO 88303-2' 1995
- Pointfolio 1.0 / A Life Music Compilation, 'I Miss You', 'the Point 104.1', '70040', 1999
- No Picnic Being Cheese: Songs of SteppingStone Theatre, 'Sun Rises in the East', 2007
- Minnesota Beatle Project, Vol. 3, 'Dear Prudence', 'Vega Productions & 89.3 The Current', 2011
