= Second Sight (The Avengers) =

- The Avengers episode
- Episode no.: Season 3 Episode 8
- Directed by: Peter Hammond
- Written by: Martin Woodhouse
- Production code: 3612
- Original air date: 16 November 1963

Guest appearances
- John Carson; Judy Bruce; Peter Bowles; Ronald Adam; Steven Scott

Episode chronology
← Previous "The Gilded Cage"	Next → "The Medicine Men"

"Second Sight" is the eighth episode of the third series of the 1960s cult British spy-fi television series The Avengers, starring Patrick Macnee and Honor Blackman. It was first broadcast by ABC on 16 November 1963. The episode was directed by Peter Hammond and written by Martin Woodhouse.

== Plot ==
A multi-millionaire is about to receive a corneal graft to treat his blindness. Steed is tasked with escorting the live corneas from Switzerland to London. However, when the eye surgeon involved expresses concerns about the operation, he is murdered, causing Steed to mount his own investigation. Mrs Gale plays a doctor.

== Cast ==
- Patrick Macnee as John Steed
- Honor Blackman as Cathy Gale
- John Carson as Marten Halvarssen
- Judy Bruce as Eve Hawn
- Peter Bowles as Neil Anstice
- Ronald Adam as Dr. Spender
- Steven Scott as Dr. Vilner
- Terry Brewer as Steiner
