= The White Elephant =

- The Avengers episode
- Episode no.: Season 3 Episode 15
- Directed by: Laurence Bourne
- Written by: John Lucarotti
- Production code: 3616
- Original air date: 4 January 1964

Guest appearances
- Godfrey Quigley; Edwin Richfield; Scott Forbes; Bruno Barnabe; Judy Parfitt

Episode chronology
← Previous "Dressed to Kill"	Next → "The Little Wonders"

"The White Elephant" is the fifteenth episode of the third series of the 1960s cult British spy-fi television series The Avengers, starring Patrick Macnee and Honor Blackman. It was first broadcast by ABC on 4 January 1964. The episode was written by John Lucarotti.

== Plot ==
Following the theft of Snowy, a rare albino elephant, Steed and Cathy are brought in to investigate illegal ivory smuggling.

== Cast ==
- Patrick Macnee as John Steed
- Honor Blackman as Cathy Gale
- Godfrey Quigley as Noah Marshall
- Edwin Richfield as Professor Thaddeus Lawrence
- Scott Forbes as Lew Conniston
- Bruno Barnabe as Fitch
- Judy Parfitt as Brenda Paterson
- Rowena Gregory as Madge Jordan
- Toke Townley as Joseph Gourlay
- Martin Friend as George
