= Mike Tomkies =

British writer (1928–2016)

Mike Tomkies (25 May 1928 – 6 October 2016), known as The Wilderness Man, was a British author covering subjects such as natural history, biography and fiction, a naturalist and filmmaker who became famous due to his accounts of living in the wildest and most remote parts of Canada, Scotland and Spain.

== Biography ==
Born in 1928 in West Bridgford, Notts, Mike Tomkies grew up with his family in Whitley Bay near Newcastle upon Tyne, later moving south to Worthing and then Henfield near Brighton. Protected and driven by his father Vincent after losing his mother, who died during childbirth with his sister, Mike developed his fascination with nature and adventure in the English countryside that surrounded him.

An early example of his wanderlust was an attempt to sail around the world in 1952, which ended with him being shipwrecked and having to walk 400 miles (640 km) from Lisbon to Madrid.

He served with the Coldstream Guards in the Middle East and at Buckingham Palace, and moved on to become a successful Fleet Street journalist, later freelancing in Paris, Madrid and Rome before being assigned as a Hollywood columnist until the age of 38 when he decided to quit journalism and emigrated to the Canadian wilds.

At that time, Tomkies was involved with the British actress Alexandra Bastedo, later best known for her starring role in The Champions. Although they never married, they stayed in touch for the remainder of their lives.

Starting a new life in British Columbia, he set out virtually penniless in an old milk truck driving across Canada to build a log cabin on the Canadian Pacific coast where he variously worked as a logger, assistant blaster and sea salmon fisherman but spent most of his time living alone and surviving mainly off the sea. This was where he began his wildlife studies tracking grizzly bears, cougars, caribou, bald eagles and killer whales, which over three years developed into the book Alone in the Wilderness, which was published by Reader's Digest and became a critically acclaimed best seller.

Running short on funds, Tomkies returned to writing in Hollywood, accompanied by Booto, a stray wild dog who had adopted him in Canada and who enjoyed the attention of stars such as Cary Grant, Omar Sharif and Peter Finch during interviews.

The two also travelled around Mexico and Belize, where Tomkies spent hours with Dean Martin on the outdoor location of 5 Card Stud, even photographing the star doing his own dangerous stunts. Tomkies was the first to test the new Tartan Athletics Track built in Mexico City for the 1968 Olympics while writing for the Daily Express and, with Booto, climbed the Pyramid of the Sun, hacked through rough tracks to the ancient ruins of Palenque, and visited the Well of Sacrifice at Chichen Itza where the ancient Mayans sacrificed people to assuage the rain god Chac.

He returned briefly to Canada and hired native American guide, Clayton Mack, and they went on dangerous treks deep in grizzly country, saw 21 bears in three days and were lucky to escape with their lives.

After another year in the wilds of Canada, Tomkies returned to Hollywood for more experiences with major film stars. He went motorbiking in the Mojave Desert with Steve McQueen; spent days with and gained insights into the life of John Wayne; while Doris Day, 'America's sweetheart', offered him a screen test. Tomkies had several meetings with Robert Mitchum, who 'laid a joint' on him when he asked if Mitchum was still smoking pot.

Tomkies returned to the UK and moved to Eilean Shona, a remote island off the west coast of Scotland. There he rebuilt a wooden crofthouse which had been used as a shelter for sheep and began observing and writing about Scottish nature. including the golden eagle, black throated diver, pine marten and Scottish wildcat.

The studies and writing continued at a small crofter's cottage called Gaskan on the shore of Loch Shiel, which Tomkies renamed "Wildernesse", and where he cared for a variety of injured animals, tracked and studied golden eagles over a 300-square-mile (780 km^{2}) area for the government and was the first person to successfully breed the now critically endangered Scottish wildcat and return individuals to the wild. Here he wrote nine books about the wildlife in the Scottish West Highlands.

Tomkies studied eagles in Canada, Scotland and Spain from 1967 to 2011, spending more than 3000 hours on precarious cliff ledges in hides for up to 38 hours at a time. Over his 20 years in the Highlands Tomkies revealed Scotland's rarest wildlife in his books to widespread acclaim from naturalists, conservationists, critics and even the Duke of Edinburgh.

"This book does more than describe a piece of wild country and its population of wild animals: it gives a picture of someone totally absorbed by his subject... The North west of Scotland is indeed a wild place, but to the observant eye of the author it is full of wonderful life."

A Last Wild Place is the most famous of his books written about Wildernesse, it has been a best seller ever since it was first published in 1984. For eight years, Tomkies' only companion was his German Shepherd dog Moobli, who assisted him in his wildlife tracking. After Moobli died Tomkies spent the next four years alone, completing his studies of golden eagles and rare Scottish species. He then spent five years in mountain ranges throughout Spain making two films and writing a book about species including brown bear, lynx, wolf, wild boar, vultures and eagles. Tomkies worked in a dwelling with no glass in the windows or running water.

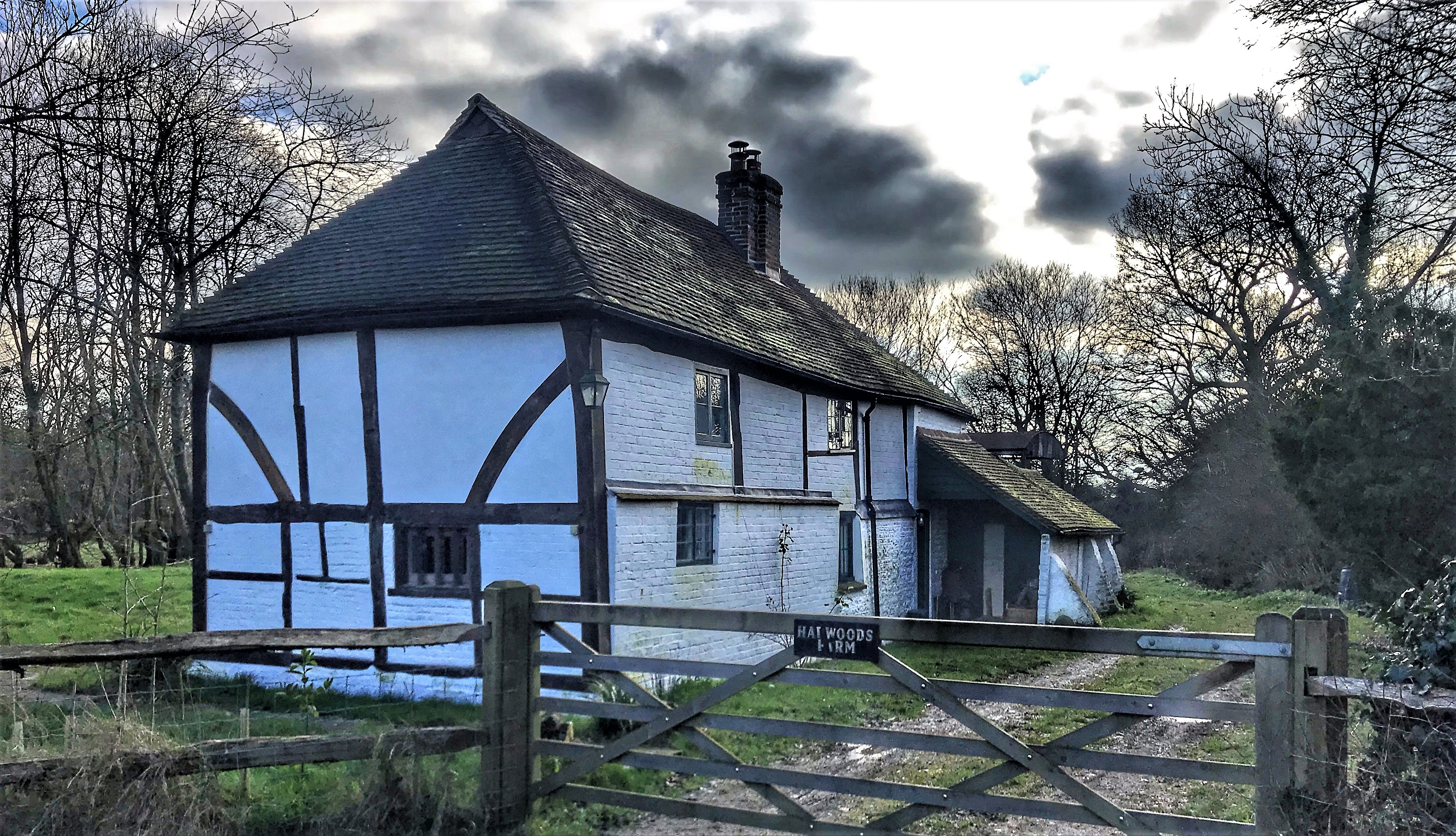
Harwoods Farmhouse, Tomkies' home near Henfield, West Sussex

Tomkies recorded twelve feature-length films on wildlife with a focus on Scotland and the golden eagle. Three network TV programmes were made about his life and work in the wilds, the last of which, Wild Cathedral, was repeated seven times.

In 1988 he was recognised for his work by being elected an Honorary Fellow of the Royal Zoological Society of Scotland.

Latterly, Tomkies was based at Harwoods, a farmstead near Henfield, West Sussex. He appeared in the documentary film Last of the Scottish Wildcats (Coffee Films 2006) and became the patron for a new charity, the Scottish Wildcat Association in 2009, who also recognised his achievements naming him an Honorary Member of the Association for life. He continued to travel regularly into the Scottish Highlands spending his 83rd birthday filming nesting eagles in Galloway with an RSPB team, and in 2014, having said his first fictional work, Let Ape and Tiger Die, would be his last novel, he released a new wildlife book, Running Wild, published by Whittles, bringing his life experiences in the wild up to date.

Tomkies died aged 88 on 6 October 2016 and is buried along with other family members in Whitley Bay Cemetery.

== Bibliography ==
- The Big Man : the John Wayne Story, Barker (1971) ISBN 0-213-00342-2
- It Sure Beats Working: The Robert Mitchum Story, W. H. Allen (1972) ISBN 0-491-00962-3
- A World of My Own: Adventure and Personal Renewal in the Wilderness, Reader's Digest Press and Fitzhenry & Whiteside, (Toronto, 1976) ISBN 0-88902-044-2; republished as:
  - Alone in the Wilderness Macdonald and Jane's (1977) ISBN 0-354-04142-8
  - Alone in the Wilderness Whittles (2001) ISBN 1-870325-14-1
- My Wilderness Wildcats, Macdonald and Jane's (1977) ISBN 0-354-04223-8
- Liane: A Cat from the Wild, Macdonald and Jane's (1979) ISBN 0-354-04374-9
- Between Earth and Paradise, Heinemann (1981) ISBN 0-434-78800-7
  - Between Earth and Paradise, Jonathan Cape (1991) ISBN 0-224-02880-4 (revised edition)
  - Between Earth and Paradise, Whittles Publishing (latest edition)
- Golden Eagle Years, Heinemann (1982) ISBN 0-434-78801-5
  - Golden Eagle Years, Jonathan Cape (1994)
- A Last Wild Place, Jonathan Cape (1984) ISBN 0-224-02219-9
- Out of the Wild, Jonathan Cape, (1985) ISBN 0-224-02317-9
- Wildcat Haven, Jonathan Cape, (1987) ISBN 0-224-02502-3
- On Wing and Wild Water, Jonathan Cape (1987) ISBN 0-224-02825-1
- Moobli, Jonathan Cape (1988), ISBN 1-85089-617-8
- In Spain's Secret Wilderness, Jonathan Cape (1989) ISBN 0-224-02716-6
- Wildcats (with illustrations by Dennis Ovenden), Whittet Books (1991) ISBN 0-905483-86-3
- Last Wild Years, Jonathan Cape (1992) ISBN 0-224-03313-1
- My Wicked First Life - Before the Wilderness, Whittles Publishing (2006) ISBN 1-904445-35-7
- Rare, Wild and Free , Whittles Publishing (2007) ISBN 1-904445-51-9
- Backwoods Mates to Hollywood Greats, Whittles Publishing (2009) ISBN 978-1-904445-83-8
- Wildcat Haven, Whittles Publishing (2009) ISBN 978-1-904445-75-3 (revised and updated)
- Let Ape and Tiger Die (a novel), Whittles Publishing (2010) ISBN TBC
- Running Wild, Whittles Publishing (2014) ISBN 978-184995-123-4
