= Death a la Carte =

- The Avengers episode
- Episode no.: Season 3 Episode 13
- Directed by: Kim Mills
- Written by: John Lucarotti
- Production code: 3604
- Original air date: 21 December 1963

Guest appearances
- Robert James; Henry Soskin; Paul Dawkins; Ken Parry; Gordon Rollings

Episode chronology
← Previous "Don't Look Behind You"	Next → "Dressed to Kill"

"Death a la Carte" is the thirteenth episode of the third series of the 1960s cult British spy-fi television series The Avengers, starring Patrick Macnee and Honor Blackman. It was first broadcast by ABC on 21 December 1963. The episode was directed by Kim Mills and written by John Lucarotti.

== Plot ==
Steed and Cathy are assigned to protect the Emir Abdulla Akaba during his trade visit to London, but despite their best efforts in food service he is assassinated. The Avengers must discover who and what killed him.

== Cast ==
- Patrick Macnee as John Steed
- Honor Blackman as Cathy Gale
- Robert James as Brigadier Mellor
- Henry Soskin as Emir Abdulla Akaba
- Paul Dawkins as Dr. Sir Ralph Spender
- Ken Parry as Arbuthnot
- Gordon Rollings as Lucien Chaplet
- David Nettheim as Umberto Equi
- Coral Atkins as Josie
- Valentino Musetti as Ali
