= Murder Ain't What it Used to Be! =

- Randall and Hopkirk (Deceased) episode
- Episode no.: Season 1 Episode 7
- Directed by: Jeremy Summers
- Written by: Tony Williamson
- Production code: 07
- Original air date: 2 November 1969

Guest appearances
- David Healy; Alan Gifford; Sue Gerrard; Raymond Adamson; Joyce Carey

Episode chronology
← Previous "All Work and No Pay"	Next → "Whoever Heard of a Ghost Dying?"

"Murder Ain't What it Used to Be!" is the seventh episode of the 1969 ITC British television series Randall and Hopkirk (Deceased) starring Mike Pratt, Kenneth Cope and Annette Andre. Directed by Jeremy Summers, the episode was first broadcast on 2 November 1969 on ITV.

== Cast ==
- Mike Pratt as Jeff Randall
- Kenneth Cope as Marty Hopkirk
- Annette Andre as Jeannie Hopkirk
- Raymond Adamson .... Jack Lacey
- Joyce Carey .... Mrs. Maddox
- Patrick Connor .... Harry
- Sue Gerrard .... Susan Kirstner
- Alan Gifford .... Paul Kirstner
- David Healy .... Bugsy Spanio
- Charles Lamb .... Hotel Porter
