= Whoever Heard of a Ghost Dying? =

- Randall and Hopkirk (Deceased) episode
- Episode no.: Season 1 Episode 8
- Directed by: Ray Austin
- Written by: Tony Williamson
- Production code: 08
- Original air date: 9 November 1969

Guest appearances
- John Fraser; Charles Lloyd-Pack; Alexandra Bastedo

Episode chronology
← Previous "Murder Ain't What it Used to Be"	Next → "The House on Haunted Hill"

Whoever Heard of a Ghost Dying? is the eighth episode of the 1969 ITC British television series Randall and Hopkirk (Deceased) starring Mike Pratt, Kenneth Cope and Annette Andre. The episode was first broadcast on 9 November 1969 on ITV. The episode was directed by Ray Austin.

== Synopsis ==
A gang of criminals led by David Hellingworth has been filming Jeff talking to Marty. One gang member, Cecil Purley, is a psychic who can sense when Marty is present. In disguise, the group offers a fake £50,000 reward for Jeff to collect information on a gang of criminals. Unbeknownst to Jeff, the group has hired him to follow them. They are using Cecil's powers to feed Marty misinformation about their crimes, which is then passed to Jeff and the police, throwing them off the trail. As the gang's crime spree continues unabated, the police inspector begins to suspect Randall.

The group entices Jeannie to give them Marty's watch and cuff links, pretending to want to free his spirit from being trapped on earth. The exorcism ritual weakens Marty, making him feel ill throughout the episode. Marty eventually realizes what is going and tells Jeff to go to his grave, where the exorcism must be completed. Hellingworth threatens Jeff, but the Inspector, who followed Jeff to the graveyard out of suspicion, saves him. The gang is arrested and Jeff is found innocent.

== Cast ==
- Mike Pratt as Jeff Randall
- Kenneth Cope as Marty Hopkirk
- Annette Andre as Jeannie Hopkirk
- Ivor Dean as Inspector Large
- Charles Lloyd Pack as Cecil Purley
- John Fraser as Hellingworth
- Alexandra Bastedo as Carol Latimer
- Richard Caldicot as Doctor
- Romo Gorrara as Reg
- Peter Hughes as Butler
- Robin John as the Constable
- Terence Plummer as Pete
- John Richmond as Lord Manning
- Paddy Ryan as Larry

== Production ==
Although the 8th episode in the series, Whoever Heard of a Ghost Dying? was the 10th episode to be shot, filmed mainly in October 1968. The episode was directed by Ray Austin. In the episode, Charles Lloyd Pack's character, Cecil Purley, is a clairvoyant who is hired to exorcise Marty.

Hellingworth's mansion in the episode, where the gang plan their next robberies, under the watchful eye of Marty Hopkirk was set at Aldenham Grange in Letchmore Heath, Hertfordshire, though only a photograph was used to identify it, the interior scenes were shot in the studio. The offices of Hackley, Mathers & Jones Diamon merchants was set at Remax House in 31-2 Alfred Place, Bloomsbury. The cemetery featured at the end during the exorcism, which also appeared in the episode "Somebody Just Walked Over My Grave" and numerous other ITC series, was shot at New Southgate Cemetery in Brunswick Park Road in New Southgate, London.
