= The Grandeur That Was Rome =

- The Avengers episode
- Episode no.: Season 3 Episode 10
- Directed by: Kim Mills
- Written by: Rex Edwards
- Production code: 3607
- Original air date: 30 November 1963

Guest appearances
- Hugh Burden; Colette Wilde; John Flint; Ian Shand; Raymond Adamson

Episode chronology
← Previous "The Medicine Men"	Next → "The Golden Fleece"

"The Grandeur That Was Rome" is the tenth episode of the third series of the 1960s cult British spy-fi television series The Avengers, starring Patrick Macnee and Honor Blackman. It was first broadcast by ABC on 30 November 1963. The episode was directed by Kim Mills and written by Rex Edwards.

== Plot ==
A megalomaniac food manufacturer who is obsessed with ancient Rome, is deliberately tainting his company's grain with ergot. Steed and Cathy are brought in to investigate.

== Cast ==
- Patrick Macnee as John Steed
- Honor Blackman as Cathy Gale
- Hugh Burden as Sir Bruno Luca
- Colette Wilde as Octavia
- John Flint as Marcus Dodds
- Ian Shand as Eastow
- Raymond Adamson as Lucius
- Kenneth Keeling as Appleton
- Colin Rix as Sergeant Barnes
