= Bill Wallis =

English actor (1936–2013)

- Bill Wallis
- Born: William Wallis; 20 November 1936; Guildford, Surrey, England
- Died: 6 September 2013 (aged 76); Bath, Somerset, England
- Occupation: Actor
- Spouses: Jean Spalding; Karen Mills
- Children: 4

William Wallis (20 November 1936 – 6 September 2013) was an English actor who appeared in numerous radio and television roles, as well as in the theatre.

== Early life ==
Wallis was born in Guildford in Surrey, the only son of Albert Wallis, a trainee fishmonger turned engineer, and his wife, Anne, a nurse. He attended Farnham Grammar School from 1948 to 1955, where he was head boy. He gained a State Scholarship to St John's College, Cambridge, and while at Cambridge met Peter Cook and David Frost. When Cook and the team took Beyond the Fringe to Broadway, Wallis took over the roles played by Alan Bennett.

== Career ==
Wallis appeared in a number of television programmes including The Avengers (one episode in both 1966 and 1967), Chelmsford 123, Doctor at Large (1971), ITV's production of The Secret Diary of Adrian Mole, the BBC's adaptation of John Masefield's book The Box of Delights (1984), the first series of Blackadder (drunken knight), Blackadder II (Ploppy the Gaoler), Blackadder Goes Forth (Agent Brigadier Smith), Juliet Bravo, Just Good Friends (A. J. Styles) Yes, Prime Minister, and The Beiderbecke Tapes (1987), in which he played a beleaguered Amsterdam hotelier. (1993) Wallis played the disgruntled scientist who kills his boss in Poirot (The Underdog).One longstanding role was that of the hard-drinking Nick McKenzie in the BBC drama Dangerfield, from 1995 until 1998. He appeared as Gestapo-man Werner Beck in award-winning War and Remembrance (1988). He also appeared briefly in the first episode of ITV's Midsomer Murders, apparently driving a Morgan sports car. In fact this was pushed by other cast members, as he did not hold a driving licence. He appeared in Not Only... But Also with Peter Cook and Dudley Moore, alongside comic actors John Wells and Joe Melia, singing the absurdist comic song "Alan a' Dale". He appeared in the original London cast of the unsuccessful Andrew Lloyd Webber/Alan Ayckbourn musical Jeeves in 1975. He presented and narrated a semi-dramatised documentary titled A Pleasant Terror on the life and works of M. R. James, broadcast by ITV in December 1995.

Some of Wallis's most frequent appearances were on BBC Radio 4 for The Afternoon Play and the Classic Serial, but he was also in the cast of the long-running sketch show Week Ending, and in the first episode of The Hitchhiker's Guide to the Galaxy in 1978, originating the roles of Mr. Prosser and Prostetnic Vogon Jeltz. He reprised the latter in the second episode and in one episode of the second series; however, due to unavailability, the roles of Jeltz and (briefly) Prosser were taken over by Toby Longworth. He played Winston Hayballs in Peter Tinniswood's Winston series. He also featured as the third party in the "...is approached by Ivor Cutler" series of short humorous pieces, including playing the Miner, the Farmer and the Sheet Metal Worker.

Wallis also read audiobooks, among them unabridged productions of Robert Harris's first two novels about the life of Cicero, Imperium (2006) and Lustrum (2009). The third and final novel, Dictator (2015) was not published until after Wallis's death. Wallis's role as narrator was taken over by David Rintoul. He has also read several audiobooks in John Mortimer's "Rumpole of the Bailey" series.

Wallis's film appearances include The Bed Sitting Room (1969), The Romantic Englishwoman (1975), The Orchard End Murder (1981), Brazil (1985), The Whistle Blower (1986), The Great Escape II: The Untold Story (1988), The Fool (1990), Splitting Heirs (1993), Keep the Aspidistra Flying (1997) and The Other Boleyn Girl (2008).

== Personal life ==
Wallis had two children with his first wife, the cellist Jean Spalding, and two children with his second wife, Karen Wallis (née Mills), whom he married in 1979. He suffered from multiple myeloma, a form of bone marrow cancer, but was able to continue performing in audio and radio work. Wallis died at his home in Bath on 6 September 2013.

== Filmography ==
Year	Title	Role	Notes
1969	The Bed Sitting Room	The Prime Minister	
1975	Galileo	Supporting Monk	
1975	The Romantic Englishwoman	Hendrick	
1981	The Orchard End Murder	Railway Gatekeeper	
1984	The Box of Delights	Rat	TV series
1985	Brazil	Bespectacled Lurker	
1986	The Whistle Blower	Ramsay Dodgson	
1988	The Great Escape II: The Untold Story	Schatz	TV movie
1990	Crimestrike	Edward Lovegarden	
1990	The Fool	Henry Beauchamp-Harper	
1993	Splitting Heirs	Vicar at Hunt	
1993	Son of the Pink Panther	President	
1997	Keep the Aspidistra Flying	Mr. Cheeseman	
2003	Wondrous Oblivion	Newsreel Commentary	Voice
2008	The Other Boleyn Girl	Archbishop Cranmer	(final film role)
