= Ryan Plewacki =

- Born: November 22, 1980 (age 44)
- Origin: Minneapolis, Minnesota, United States
- Genres: Rock music
- Occupation(s): Musician, songwriter, guitarist
- Instrument(s): Vocals, guitar
- Years active: 2006–present
- Labels: Simon Recordings
- Website: sleepstudymusic.com

Ryan Plewacki (born November 22, 1980) is an American musician and guitarist. Plewacki is the leader of Sleep Study and guitarist for The Honeydogs since 2012.

In 2011, Plewacki formed the band Sleep Study (who released their debut record Nothing Can Destroy on Simon Recordings in August 2012). Shortly after the release of that record, Plewacki was asked by Adam Levy of The Honeydogs to perform as lead guitarist at the release show for What Comes After, joined them for South by Southwest in 2012 and continues to perform in that role. Plewacki's guitar work is featured on the 2016 release, Love & Cannibalism. Plewacki was also recruited by Darren Jackson of Kid Dakota to perform at the release of Listen to the Crows As They Take Flight and live performances throughout 2012. In 2016, Plewacki joined Mark Mallman for live performances and continues in that position.

Plewacki currently resides in Minneapolis, MN.
