= Maurice Good =

Irish actor (1932–2013)

- Born: Maurice P. E. Good; 7 June 1932; Dublin, Ireland
- Died: 10 May 2013 (aged 80); Corner Brook, Newfoundland, Canada
- Education: Terenure College
- Occupations: Actor, teacher, writer
- Spouse(s): Claudia Forbes (m. 1954, divorced) Susan Malley

Maurice Good (8 June 1932 – 10 May 2013) was an Irish actor with a career on stage and screen in his home country, the United Kingdom and Canada.

== Early life ==
Graduating from Terenure College, it was here where Good played the part of Cassius in Julius Caesar that he decided to become an actor. Aged 18, he embarked on a stage career rather than go to university, continuing his training in London.

== Career ==
During the 1950s, Good was a member of many theatrical establishments including Anew McMaster's Intimate Theatre Company (where he received his early training), the Gate Theatre and Abbey Theatre. With the latter company, he toured with the Dublin Players on their 1957–58 tour of America.

Venturing to London in 1960, Good appeared on stage with the Old Vic, Joan Littlewood's Theatre Workshop and Oxford Playhouse. In addition, he made appearances in numerous TV shows including BBC Sunday-Night Play, Armchair Theatre, The Avengers (episodes: Hunt the Man Down, Don't Look Behind You and Split!), No Hiding Place, Espionage, Z-Cars, Public Eye, Coronation Street, Doctor Who (the historical romp The Gunfighters), Emergency Ward 10, The Saint, Dixon of Dock Green, Man in a Suitcase, ITV Playhouse, Special Branch, Softly, Softly: Task Force and New Scotland Yard. He also featured in films with roles in cult classics such as The Skull, They Came from Beyond Space, Quatermass and the Pit and Joan Crawford's last feature Trog. He also starred in Bomb in the High Street in 1963.

With his writer brother John, Good wrote a one-man stage play during 1964–65 about the life of Michael Collins entitled Hang the Bright Colours. However, it never came to fruition. (Their father Joe had known the revolutionary and politician, being members of the same Gaelic League Branch. Joe's journal chronicling the 1916 Easter Rising and its aftermath was written in 1946 and edited by Maurice for publication in 1996 as Enchanted by Dreams: The Journal of a Revolutionary by Brandon Books then reprinted as Inside the GPO 1916: A First-hand Account by the O'Brien Press in 2015.) The brothers penned The Antonietta, a modern version of the Deirdre myth, performed at the Gate Theatre but the production was a failure. Maurice did find success though with his one-man show John Synge Comes Next based on the writings of John Millington Synge. First produced at the Dublin Theatre Festival in 1969, it went on to be toured throughout Ireland followed by England, Canada, New York, and Beirut, eventually being published in book form in 1973.

Realising that he wasn't getting many acting opportunities in Dublin or London, Good decided by 1974 to move to Canada (having proved popular there as a result of his Synge tour in 1971). Settling in Toronto, he performed in another monologue piece The Ham in Sam: Beckett Stage Direction, based on the works of Samuel Beckett and commissioned by York University, presented at Manitoba, Calgary and Kingston. At Citadel Theatre, the actor was directed by John Neville in 1976 productions of Beckett's Endgame and Henrik Ibsen's The Master Builder. On screen, he appeared in Performance, The New Avengers (in "Forward Base", a Canada-based episode), Night Heat and Love & Larceny.

Spending a number of years working at Stratford Festival, Good was asked by director Robin Phillips in 1979 to act as an understudy to Peter Ustinov in a production of King Lear. During this time, Good kept a journal of the rehearsals, which was published as a book entitled Every Inch a Lear in 1982.

== Later life ==
In 1988, Good visited Sir Wilfred Grenfell College in Newfoundland. Moving there the following year, he became a teacher in the theatre program, directing student plays as well as acting in them. Despite retiring in 1997, the actor continued to lecture until 2002, afterwards remaining in the city until his death.

== Personal life ==
While performing in theatre during his early years, Good met actress Claudia "Twinkle" Forbes, the daughter of theatre impresario Dick Forbes (who died before they could meet). They married in 1954.
