= Dressed to Kill (The Avengers) =

- The Avengers episode
- Episode no.: Season 3 Episode 14
- Directed by: Bill Bain
- Written by: Brian Clemens
- Production code: 3617
- Original air date: 28 December 1963

Guest appearances
- Leonard Rossiter; Alexander Davion; Richard Leech; John Junkin; Anneke Wills

Episode chronology
← Previous "Death a la Carte"	Next → "The White Elephant"

"Dressed to Kill" is the fourteenth episode of the third series of the 1960s cult British spy-fi television series The Avengers, starring Patrick Macnee and Honor Blackman. It originally aired on ABC on 28 December 1963. The episode was directed by Bill Bain and written by Brian Clemens.

== Plot ==
A false alarm triggers all but one of the nation's nuclear attack early warning systems. Steed and Cathy go undercover to investigate and are invited to a fancy dress party on a train. One of the party guests turns out to be a killer. The plot was reused in a later episode, The Superlative Seven.

== Cast ==
- Patrick Macnee as John Steed
- Honor Blackman as Cathy Gale
- Leonard Rossiter as Robin Hood, William J. Cavendish
- Alexander Davion as Napoleon, Frederick Preston
- Richard Leech as Policeman, Jack Roberts
- John Junkin as Sheriff, Kenneth Johnson
- Anneke Wills as Pussy Cat, Jane Wentworth
- Anthea Windham as Highwaywoman, Dorothy Wilson
- Leon Eagles as Newman
- Frank Maher as Barman
