= Janice Willett =

British television producer with ABC Television

- Born: October 30, 1932 (age 92)
- Died: November 6, 2018 (aged 86)
- Occupation: Television producer
- Years active: 1950s–1960s
- Notable work: State Your Case producer credit

Janice Willett (30 October 1932 – 6 November 2018) was a British television producer with ABC Television during the 1950s and 1960s, at the time being one of only a few female producers working in television.

Her television career began at the BBC where she worked as secretary to Michael Barry, head of drama for BBC Television, and later joined producer Dennis Vance as his assistant. In 1955 she left the BBC along with Vance to work at Highbury Studios where she was a production assistant for programmes such as Theatre Royal and TV Playhouse, before joining ABC in 1956. At ABC she produced programmes such as Moment of Fame as well as various children's shows. Vance soon joined her there, and she helped him to organise ABC’s drama department, before she became a producer in her own right.

One of the programmes Willett produced for ABC was State Your Case, a show that invited viewers to write in for a chance to win £100 to help them fulfil a personal dream. Letters would typically be from parents wishing to visit their children overseas, young couples in need of a deposit for a house, or individuals with business ideas, including one viewer who wanted the money to build a rocket ship capable of reaching outer space. State Your Case began in ABC's northern region, but was aired nationally from February 1957. Willett also produced The Sunday Break, a religious programme for younger people that aired on Sunday evenings and which was presented by Julie Stevens. In March 1961, the programme aired "A Man Dies", a controversial Passion Play depicting Jesus Christ dressed in a pair of jeans.

On 11 April 1961 Willett was treated at the West Middlesex Hospital after Vance stabbed her in the shoulder during an incident at ABC's Teddington Studios. Filming for "Dance with Death", an episode of The Avengers, had been underway at the studios at the time. Vance, who had experienced a mental breakdown the previous year, was charged with grievous bodily harm later the same day after giving himself up to police. At his subsequent trial, held at the Old Bailey on 27 April, Vance was found guilty due to diminished responsibility and sentenced to three years' probation, after a psychiatrist successfully argued in his defence. He was ordered to spend twelve months of this sentence as a patient at London's St Luke's Hospital. Vance was dismissed by ABC, but later worked for Associated Television.

Willett left ABC in 1962 to join Border Television, then in 1966 moved to the Central Office of Information, and little is known about her life after that. She married composer and writer Norman Kay in 1969, and the couple had a daughter. Norman Kay died in 2001. A long-term resident of Richmond in southwest London, in her later years Willett became involved with the Richmond Society and took over responsibility for their publicity. She died on 6 November 2018.
