= Dennis Vance =

British TV producer and director (1924–1983)

Dennis Vance (18 March 1924 – 6 October 1983) was a British television producer, director, and occasional actor.

== Career ==
Born in Birkenhead, Cheshire, he signed up as a Fleet Air Arm pilot during the Second World War. Post-war he began his career as an actor in the late 1940s, appearing in small film parts, such as Poet's Pub, in 1949, before switching to become a producer with BBC Television in the early 1950s. Later, in 1955 he became the first Head of Drama at the ITV contractor ABC Weekend TV, who went on air in 1956, serving the Midlands and the North of England at weekends. He also produced episodes of The Adventures of the Scarlet Pimpernel (1956), also directing a couple of episodes.

At ABC, Vance oversaw the creation of the anthology drama series Armchair Theatre, which was networked nationally across the ITV regions on Sunday evenings. It became an important long running landmark in British television drama series. Vance, however, left the Head of Drama role in 1958 for a promotion within ABC, being replaced by Sydney Newman. He soon returned to producing and directing work, helming episodes of programmes such as ABC's The Avengers (1961).

On 11 April 1961 Vance stabbed his colleague Janice Willett in the shoulder during filming for the Avengers episode Dance with Death at ABC's Teddington Studios. Vance, who had experienced a mental breakdown the previous year, was charged with grievous bodily harm later the same day after giving himself up to police. At his subsequent trial, held at the Old Bailey on 27 April, Vance was found guilty due to diminished responsibility and sentenced to three years' probation, after a psychiatrist successfully argued in his defence. He was ordered to spend twelve months of this sentence as a patient at London's St Luke's Hospital.

Vance was dismissed by ABC, but later worked for Associated Television and others. He produced and directed Thames' The Rivals of Sherlock Holmes (1971). He produced and directed The Misfit and The Bass Player and the Blonde for ATV, and directed episodes of Public Eye and Van der Valk for Thames. He also became involved with the Thomson Organization, helping to set up radio and television operations for developing countries.

== Marriages and death ==
Vance was married six times, with one child from each of his first three marriages. He died in Wimbledon, London in 1983, at the age of fifty-nine.

== Filmography ==
- Scott of the Antarctic (1948)
- Trouble in the Air (1948)
- Warning to Wantons (1949)
- Poet's Pub (1949)
- Shadow of the Eagle (1950)
