= Dance with Death (The Avengers) =

- The Avengers episode
- Episode no.: Season 1 Episode 12
- Directed by: Don Leaver
- Written by: Peter Ling and Sheilah Ward
- Production code: 3376
- Original air date: 15 April 1961

Guest appearances
- Caroline Blakiston; Angela Douglas; Geoffrey Palmer

Episode chronology
← Previous "Please Don't Feed the Animals"	Next → "One for the Mortuary"

"Dance with Death" is the twelfth episode of the first series of the 1960s cult British spy-fi television series The Avengers, starring Ian Hendry and Patrick Macnee and guest starring Caroline Blakiston, Angela Douglas and Geoffrey Palmer. It was first broadcast by ABC on 15 April 1961. The episode is considered to be lost. The episode was directed by Don Leaver, designed by James Goddard, and written by Peter Ling and Sheilah Ward.

== Plot ==
Dr. Keel saves a dancing instructor from dying from gas asphyxiation. The woman is later discovered strangled with Keel's scarf and he is framed for the murder. Steed suspects the pianist at the woman's dancing school who is accused of numerous murders to be responsible. The killer's trademark is to kill his victims by tossing a radio into the bathtub and electrocuting them. Keel is vindicated by Steed and arrives in the nick of time to stop the killer who has married a young woman and is about to murder her and steal her large cache of diamonds.

== Cast ==
- Ian Hendry as Dr. David H. Keel
- Patrick Macnee as John Steed
- Ingrid Hafner as Carol Wilson
- Caroline Blakiston as Elaine Bateman
- Norman Chappell as Porter
- Angela Douglas as Beth Wilkinson
- Diana King as Mrs. Marnell
- Geoffrey Palmer as Philip Anthony/Clifford Gardner
- Ewan Roberts as Major Caswell
- Pauline Shepherd as Valerie Marnell
- David Sutton as Trevor Price
- Alan Barry as Barman
- Ian Hobbs as Teenage Boy
- Raymond Hodge as Plainclothes Man
- Graham Spurway as Hotel Receptionist
- Neil Wilson as Police Sergeant

== Production ==
Production for the episode was completed on 13 April 1961.

== Stabbing incident ==
On 11 April 1961 ABC (Iris Productions) producer and director Dennis Vance - who had directed the previous Avengers episode "Please Don't Feed the Animals" - stabbed his colleague Janice Willett in the shoulder during filming for the episode at ABC's Teddington Studios. Vance, who had experienced a mental breakdown the previous year, was charged with grievous bodily harm later the same day after giving himself up to police. At his subsequent trial, held at the Old Bailey on 27 April, Vance was found guilty due to diminished responsibility and sentenced to three years' probation. He was ordered to spend twelve months of this sentence as a patient at London's St Luke's Hospital.
