= National Animal Welfare Trust =

UK charity

- Abbreviation: NAWT
- Formation: 1971
- Type: Charity
- Purpose: Rescue and re-home domestic animals and provide a place of sanctuary or retirement for animals of all types.
- Headquarters: Tylers Way, Watford Bypass, Watford, WD25 8HQ
- Region served: England and Wales
- Staff: 92
- Volunteers: 350
- Website: http://www.nawt.org.uk

The National Animal Welfare Trust (NAWT) is an animal welfare charity founded in 1971, which operates rescue and rehoming centres for companion animals. It has branches in Watford, Berkshire, Essex, Bedfordshire and Cornwall. They operate a number of premises, including Trindledown Farm, the UK's only retirement home for elderly pets. Formerly known as the Animal Welfare Trust (AWT), it originated from the British Union for the Abolition of Vivisection.

== Origin ==
The NAWT was founded in 1971 as a charity, and was originally known as the Animal Welfare Trust (National was added in 1996 to celebrate the charity's 25th anniversary). The origin of the organisation can be traced to 1958 when the British Union for the Abolition of Vivisection (BUAV) established BUAV Dog Rescue. The ideals of this new rescue organisation was to prevent dogs or puppies being bought at markets, in order to prevent them from going to laboratories for vivisection. In 1965 the name was changed to BUAV Animal Aid, in recognition that the work was not limited to only dogs.

In 1971 BUAV members established a separate charity named the Animal Welfare Trust as they felt the work of BUAV Animal Aid was departing from its original aims. From 1979, the AWT began to work with the Dr Hadwen Trust for Humane Research from its Hendon & Aldenham Boarding Kennels, in Watford, sharing facilities and staff. The Dr Hadwen Trust is now separate from the NAWT, although they work together as appropriate.

The boarding kennels in Watford were purchased in 1981, and were established as the first AWT Rescue and Re-homing centre. The centre was expanded in 1986 with expanded facilities for larger animals and more exercise paddocks. The second centre at Heaven's Gate Farm in Somerset was acquired in the early 1990s, and the third centre at Trindledown Farm, Berkshire in the late 1990s. The centre in Cornwall was acquired on the request of Molly Wyatt in 1997 who had previously run it as an independent animal re-homing centre, with the site rebuilt in 2008. The Thurrock centre is currently run out of rented boarding kennels.

== Trindledown Farm ==
Trindledown Farm is the UK's first rescue centre specialising in the rehabilitation and rehoming of elderly domestic and field animals. It is set in 10 acres (40,000 m^{2}) of fields, near Great Shefford, Berkshire. Formerly used as an equestrian centre and livery yard, it has the capacity to home 25 dogs and 10 cats at a time. Other animals accommodated include alpacas, horses, pigs, sheep, cows and birds. Each cat or dog has a private area equipped with central heating, armchairs, sofas, beds and televisions. The idea is to make each private area similar to the set-up of "an old person's sitting room", which was developed by executive director Patricia Fraser. The centre was opened in June, 2001, by DJ Bruno Brookes.
