= The Orchard End Murder =

1981 British short thriller film directed by Christian Marnham

- DVD cover
- Directed by: Christian Marnham
- Written by: Christian Marnham
- Produced by: Julian Harvey
- Starring: Tracy Hyde; Bill Wallis; Clive Mantle; Raymond Adamson
- Cinematography: Peter Jessop
- Edited by: Peter Goddard
- Music by: Sam Sklair
- Production companies: Marnham & Harvey Productions
- Distributed by: G.T.O. Films Ltd.
- Release date: 11 January 1981
- Running time: 48 minutes
- Country: England
- Language: English

The Orchard End Murder (also known as The Bunnyhole Murder) is a 1981 British short thriller film directed and written by Christian Marnham, and starring Tracy Hyde, Bill Wallis, Clive Mantle, and Raymond Adamson. It marked the film debut of Clive Mantle.

== Plot ==
In Charthurst Green, Kent in 1966, Pauline Cox accompanies her boyfriend Mike Robins to a village cricket match in which he is playing, but becomes bored and wanders away. She fetches up at the local railway halt, where she meets and is entertained to tea by an eccentric railway gatekeeper. She later meets his half-witted assistant Ewen who was seen earlier watching Pauline with Mike and upsets her when he proceeds to kill a rabbit in her presence. Making her way back to the match, Pauline is waylaid by the simple-minded Ewen as she crosses an apple orchard; when his advances become violent, she tries to fight him off while he sexually assaults and strangles her which ultimately leads to her death. That evening, the gatekeeper discovers Ewen with Pauline's body in the shack where he lives, and later helps him bury the corpse in the orchard. The next day, however, Ewen inadvertently betrays himself: the body is disinterred by the police and Ewen breaks down hysterically. Years later, the gatekeeper, who has disavowed Ewen, encourages the friendship of another village youth.

== Cast ==
- Tracy Hyde as Pauline Cox
- Clive Mantle as Ewen
- Bill Wallis as railway gatekeeper
- Raymond Adamson as Mr. Wickstead
- Jessie Evans as Mrs. Trowel
- Mollie Maureen as old lady at station
- Cyril Cross as village policeman
- Mark Hardy as Robins
- David Wilkinson as batsman
- Geoffrey Frederick as cricket captain
- Peter Hutchins as detective
- Alexander John as radio newsreader
- Alan Neame as rector
- Rik Mayall as policeman (uncredited)

== Release ==
The film was theatrically released in the United Kingdom on 1 November 1981 as a support to Dead & Buried (1981).

=== Reception ===
The Monthly Film Bulletin wrote: "Peter Jessop's carefully textured camerawork initially lends this mini-feature an edge of the picturesquely sinister. But the resolution of the anecdote is rather forced and anti-climactic, and some of the details (like the police searching the orchard at the dead of night) ring distractingly false. All the same, it represents a début of some promise."

=== Home media ===
BFI Flipside released a dual format Blu-ray/DVD edition on 24 July 2017.
