= Seen a Ghost =

Studio album by The Honeydogs
- Released: August 26, 1997
- Recorded: January 19, 1997 – February 12, 1997
- Studio: Pachyderm (Cannon Falls, Minnesota)
- Genres: Alternative rock, roots rock
- Length: 47:28
- Label: Debris/Mercury Records
- Producers: Tom Herbers, Honeydogs

The Honeydogs chronology
Everything, I Bet You (1996)	Seen a Ghost (1997)	Here's Luck (2000)

Seen a Ghost is an album by the American alternative rock band Honeydogs, released in 1997. It was the band's first album for a major label and their last with guitarist Tommy Borscheid.

The band supported the album by opening for INXS on a North American tour.

== Production ==
Recorded at Pachyderm Studios, the album was produced by Tom Herbers and the band, and mixed by Nick DiDia. Al Kooper contributed Hammond organ.

== Critical reception ==
Professional ratings
Review scores
Source	Rating
AllMusic	4/5 stars
Lincoln Journal Star	4.5/5 stars
St. Paul Pioneer Press	3/4 stars

Stereo Review called the album "this decade's freshest-sounding blast of folk-rock neoclassicism." The Lincoln Journal Star wrote that "this is a pure-pop band, one that cheerfully raids country, rock, r&b and psychedelia." Werner Trieschmann, of the Arkansas Democrat-Gazette, considered the band one of the first of an inevitable wave of copies of the Wallflowers, writing that "this one won't be the worst, I can guarantee, but that's not an endorsement either."

The Palm Beach Post deemed Honeydogs "a real rock band," writing that "no frills guitars combine with the gentle purr of a Wurlitzer or the drone of a fiddle for extra flavor." The Milwaukee Journal Sentinel listed Seen a Ghost as the fifth best album of 1997, writing that it "sidles up to an easygoing collection of pop songs and country rockers all of them unassuming, irony-free and irresistible." The St. Paul Pioneer Press opined: "Refusing to give up on the heartland strains that have fueled the group for so long, the Honeydogs are more secure in its abilities."

AllMusic called the album "a charming collection of Beatlesque pop, demonstrating the group's knack for bright, catchy melodies and ringing guitars."

== Track listing ==
All tracks are written by Adam Levy.

No.	Title	Length
1.	"Rumor Has It"	3:14
2.	"John Brown"	3:43
3.	"Cherub"	2:59
4.	"I Miss You"	4:22
5.	"Those Things Are Hers"	4:36
6.	"Into Thin Air"	3:44
7.	"Your Blue Door"	3:19
8.	"Sans Sucre"	3:01
9.	"Seen a Ghost"	4:01
10.	"Twitch"	3:29
11.	"Cut Me Loose, Napoleon"	2:34
12.	"Donna's 7"	3:03
13.	"Mainline"	3:01
14.	"Sweet Pea"	2:22
Total length:		47:28

== Personnel ==
The Honeydogs

- Adam Levy - vocals, electric guitar, acoustic guitar
- Tommy Borscheid - electric guitar, lap steel guitar, vocals
- Trent Norton - bass guitar, vocals
- Noah Levy - drums, percussion, vocals

Additional musicians

- John Fields - Wurlitzer on "John Brown", piano on "Cherub"
- Mike "Razz" Russell - fiddle on "John Brown" and "Those Things Are Hers"
- Al Kooper - organ on "John Brown" and "Those Things Are Hers"
- Jon Duncan - organ on "I Miss You", "Your Blue Door", and "Sans Surce"; piano on "I Miss You", "Into Thin Air", "Seen A Ghost", and Donna's 7; accordion on "I Miss You" and "Your Blue Door"
- Bill Goldman - cello on "Into Thin Air", "Mainline", and "Sweet Pea"
- Nanette Goldman - viola on "Into Thin Air", "Mainline", and "Sweet Pea"
- Bruce Allard - violin on "Into Thin Air", "Mainline", and "Sweet Pea"
- Stephanie Arado - violin on "Into Thin Air", "Mainline", and "Sweet Pea"
- Randy Broughten - pedal steel guitar on "Seen A Ghost"
- Jay Perlman - percussion on "Twitch"
- Marc Retish - percussion on "Twitch"
- Richard Werbowenko - percussion on "Twitch"
- Jacob Slichter- string and horn arrangements on "Mainline" and "Sweet Pea"
- James Dungan - backing vocals on "Mainline"

Production

- Tom Herbers - producing, recording, engineering
- The Honeydogs - producing
- Ed Eckstein - executive producer
- Nick Didia - mixing
- Ryan Williams - mixing
- Stephen Marcussen - mastering
- Bob De Maa - assistant engineering
- Bob Herbers - assistant engineering
- Jed Luhmann - assistant engineering
- Richard Werbowenko - assistant engineering
- Yoomi Chong - design
- Rick Patrick - art design
- James Minchin - photography
