= Martin Woodhouse =

British writer (1932–2011)

- Born: 29 August 1932; Romford, Essex
- Died: 15 May 2011 (aged 78)
- Education: Downing College, Cambridge; St Mary's Hospital, London; Medical Research Council
- Occupation: Television scriptwriter
- Notable credit(s): Supercar, The Avengers
- Family: Hugh Woodhouse (brother)

Martin Charlton Woodhouse (29 August 1932 – 15 May 2011) was a British author and scriptwriter. He is most famous as a writer for the TV series The Avengers, but he also authored or co-authored eleven novels. He was a former medical doctor, pilot, engineer and computer designer.

== Early life and education ==
Woodhouse was born in Romford and was educated at Salisbury Cathedral School and Oundle. He read Natural Sciences at Downing College, Cambridge from 1951, and Medicine at St Mary's Hospital, London, completing his postgraduate research at the Medical Research Council's applied psychology unit in Cambridge (where he built "Lettuce", a logical truth computer).

In 1959, Woodhouse was called up for National Service and worked with the Royal Air Force at the RAF Institute of Aviation Medicine, and then at the Farnborough Radar Research Establishment – RRE.

After being discharged from military service, Woodhouse worked as an author of novels and screen plays, a computer programmer and a stock trader. He also started a company, Illumination Publishing, which produced ebooks.

== Bibliography ==
=== Writing style ===
Martin Woodhouse wrote in the techno-thriller style before the category had been well defined as a subgenre. The publication in 1966 of his first novel, Tree Frog, preceded that of Michael Crichton's breakthrough novel, The Andromeda Strain by several years. What epitomises Woodhouse's stories is that the hero is a Man of Science in the broadest sense, who thwarts his opponents using wits and expertise, applying craft of all kinds; rather than relying on brawn, skill at arms, or dogged detective work (cf. the portrayal of Leonardo da Vinci in his Medici trilogy). Woodhouse's writing is filled with very dry, humorous prose. Protagonists tend to be very intelligent, sarcastic, and unimpressed with authority figures. Many of his books are filled with details that reflect his background in engineering and medicine.

=== Books by publication date ===
- Tree Frog (1966)
- Rock Baby (a.k.a. Bush Baby) (1968)
- Phil and Me (1970)
- Mama Doll (1972)
- Blue Bone (1973)
- Medici Guns (1974)
- Medici Emerald (1976)
- Moon Hill (1976)
- The Remington Set (1976)
- Medici Hawks (1978)
- Traders (1980)

=== Books by series ===
==== Giles Yeoman ====
Woodhouse wrote a series of techno-thriller novels about Giles Yeoman, an aeronautical engineer who is a reluctant participant in a variety of cloak-and-dagger exploits conducted by the British intelligence community. The plot of each book revolves around the military or intelligence applications of some new form of technology, and Yeoman's efforts to make sure that this technology doesn't fall into the hands of his opponents. Woodhouse's descriptions show the sort of attention to technical detail that would be expected from his work as an engineer for the RAF.

- Tree Frog (1966) – This is a novel about the 1960s cold war arms race to develop long-range reconnaissance drones. The action takes place in many locales, but much of it is set in Britain and Libya. The book's descriptions of aircraft control systems are clearly informed by Woodhouse's real life work on the target acquisition and guidance systems for early variants of the RAF's Bloodhound SAM.
- Bush Baby (1968) – This novel focuses on seismographs that England has illegally deployed in east block nations to try to gain information on nuclear tests. Yeoman must track down some of this equipment in the mountains of Yugoslavia to see if it has been discovered and modified to send false data. Published in the United States as Rock Baby.
- Mama Doll (1972) – Contemporary with The Terminal Man, the novel explores advanced brain surgery, and how electronic implants might be used to influence behaviour. Yeoman, himself recovering from a head injury, uses his knowledge of electronics as he tries to track down a missing cache of weapons.
- Blue Bone (1973) – The plot revolves around a scientist who is being held against his will in East Germany because he will not reveal the details of a new high-strength composite plastic he has created. Yeoman is sent in to rescue the scientist, and his engineering background allows him to devise a creative MacGyver-like method of escape.
- Moon Hill (1976) – A now wealthy Giles Yeoman tries to develop a technology to prevent a volcano from erupting and destroying a city. Again, Woodhouse – who was living in Montserrat while writing the Medici books – draws plot elements from his personal experience.

==== Leonardo da Vinci ====
Woodhouse and co-author Robert Ross wrote three novels about Leonardo da Vinci. They focus on his work as a military engineer in the service of the Duke of Milan. Leonardo is depicted as a clever, sarcastic Italian Renaissance engineer who doubts the supremacy of the Catholic Church. Many details in these books are historically based, but large portions of the stories depend upon ideas from Leonardo's sketch books being developed into functional machines. This places the novels in the alternate history or Steampunk genre.

- The Medici Guns (1974) – Leonardo develops and oversees the use of light artillery and geometry to help Lorenzo de' Medici's army of Florence end a siege at Castlemonte.
- The Medici Emerald (1976) – Leonardo da Vinci's mistress is captured by the Venetians. To save her – and the city of Florence – he must decipher a message inscribed on an emerald.
- The Medici Hawks (1978) – Muslim invaders try to conquer Italy. Leonardo helps to drive them away by building functional kite-gliders as seen in his sketch books.

=== Other novels ===
- Phil and Me (1970)
- The Remington Set (1976) – An English crime novel published under the pen name John Charlton.
- Traders (1980) – A novel about an Afghan prince who profits greatly as an arms trader

== Screenwriter ==
Woodhouse wrote the screenplays of seven episodes of the TV series The Avengers. He also wrote for several British TV series such as The Protectors, Emerald Soup, The Hidden Truth, and The Man in Room 17. He also wrote most of the screenplays for the 1961 season of the marionette TV show Supercar in partnership with his younger brother Hugh, and in 1960 two episodes of a similar show for children Four Feather Falls. He is believed to have written in excess of seventy screenplays.

=== The Avengers episodes ===
- A Chorus of Frogs (1962)
- Mr. Teddy Bear (1962)
- The Golden Eggs (1962)
- The Big Thinker (1962)
- Second Sight (1963)
- The Wringer (1964)
- A Sense of History (1965)

=== The Hidden Truth episodes ===
- The Guinea Pig (1964)
- Cause of Death (1964)

=== Supercar episodes ===
- Rescue
- Amazonian Adventure
- Talisman of Sargon
- False Alarm
- What Goes Up
- Keep It Cool
- Grounded
- Jungle Hazard
- High Tension
- A Little Art
- Ice Fall
- Island Incident
- The Tracking of Masterspy
- Phantom Piper
- Deep Seven
- Pirate Plunder
- Hostage
- The Sunken Temple
- Trapped in the Depths
- The Dragon of Ho Meng
- Magic Carpet
- The White Line
