= Hugh Woodhouse =

British screenwriter (1934–2011)

- Born: Colin Hugh Kiaran Woodhouse; 12 February 1934; Romsford, Essex
- Died: 29 August 2011 (aged 77)
- Occupation(s): Television and film screenwriter
- Notable credit: Supercar
- Family: Martin Woodhouse (brother)

Colin Hugh Kiaran Woodhouse (12 February 1934 – 29 August 2011) was a screenwriter and the younger brother of Martin Woodhouse, also a screenwriter. Together, they wrote 23 episodes of Supercar.

Woodhouse enrolled at St John's College, Cambridge, in 1954.

He co-wrote the BBC children's sitcom Leave It To Pastry (1960), the ITV sitcom Colonel Trumper's Private War (1961), and the comedy films Nearly a Nasty Accident (1961) and Dentist on the Job (1961).

In 2002, he became associated with Cubeword Games Limited, a Shaftesbury-based manufacturer of games and toys. He became a company director on 17 April, and on 7 May, Woodhouse became a secretary.

He died on 29 August 2011, which would have been his brother's 79th birthday.
