= Armageddon (1998 film) =

1998 film by Michael Bay

- Theatrical release poster
- Directed by: Michael Bay
- Screenplay by: Jonathan Hensleigh; J. J. Abrams
- Adaptation by: Tony Gilroy; Shane Salerno
- Story by: Robert Roy Pool; Jonathan Hensleigh
- Produced by: Jerry Bruckheimer; Gale Anne Hurd; Michael Bay
- Starring: Bruce Willis; Billy Bob Thornton; Liv Tyler; Ben Affleck; Will Patton; Peter Stormare; Keith David; Steve Buscemi
- Cinematography: John Schwartzman
- Edited by: Mark Goldblatt; Chris Lebenzon; Glen Scantlebury
- Music by: Trevor Rabin
- Production companies: Touchstone Pictures; Jerry Bruckheimer Films; Valhalla Motion Pictures
- Distributed by: Buena Vista Pictures Distribution
- Release dates: June 29, 1998 (Kennedy Space Center); July 1, 1998 (United States)
- Running time: 150 minutes
- Country: United States
- Language: English
- Budget: $140 million
- Box office: $553.7 million

Armageddon is a 1998 American science fiction disaster film directed by Michael Bay and co-produced by Jerry Bruckheimer. The film follows a group of blue-collar deep-core drillers sent by NASA to destroy a gigantic asteroid, which is the size of Texas, on a collision course with Earth. It stars an ensemble cast including Bruce Willis with Billy Bob Thornton, Liv Tyler, Ben Affleck, Will Patton, Peter Stormare, Keith David, Owen Wilson, William Fichtner and Steve Buscemi.

The film released on July 1, 1998, by Buena Vista Pictures through its Touchstone Pictures label. Despite receiving mixed reviews from critics, Armageddon was a commercial success, grossing $553.7 million worldwide against a $140 million budget, becoming the highest-grossing film of 1998, and the highest-grossing film to be released by Touchstone Pictures. Armageddon was released in the same summer as the similarly themed Deep Impact.

== Plot ==
A massive meteor shower destroys the orbiting Space Shuttle Atlantis before entering the atmosphere and extensively damaging New York City. The meteors were pushed out of the asteroid belt by a collision from a rogue asteroid the size of Texas and NASA learns it will impact Earth in 18 days, wiping out all life on the planet.

NASA devises a plan to drill a deep hole into the asteroid, into which they will insert and detonate a nuclear bomb to split it into two pieces that will each pass to one side of Earth. They recruit Harry Stamper, a third-generation oil driller and owner of an oil drilling company, who agrees to help but on the condition that he bring in his own team to do the drilling. He picks his best employees for the job: Chick Chapple, his best friend and right-hand man; geologists Rockhound and Oscar Choice; and drillers Bear Curlene, Max Lennert, Freddie Noonan, and A. J. Frost, who has been dating Harry's daughter Grace despite Harry's objections. Over twelve days, they are trained to become astronauts with astronaut Willie Sharp, who will pilot Freedom, one of the two super shuttles to fly to the asteroid, the other being the Independence. Before leaving, Chick apologizes to his ex-wife for wronging her and sees his son, who is unaware of his parentage, and Grace accepts A.J.'s marriage proposal, much to Harry's reluctant dismay; she later has her father promise to return home safe and with her fiancé.

Following the destruction of Shanghai by another meteor strike, word of the asteroid becomes public to the world. Both shuttles take off without incident and dock with a Russian space station to take on fuel, but when faulty materials cause the fuel pod to be set ablaze, A.J. and Roscosmos cosmonaut Lev Andropov narrowly manage to board Independence before the space station is obliterated.

Approaching the asteroid, Independence is damaged by debris and crashes, killing Oscar, Freddie, and the rest of the crew. The survivors—Lev, Bear and A.J., embark in the shuttle's mobile driller "Armadillo" to find the Freedom crew, which landed 26 miles (42 km) from its intended landing/drilling site. When the drilling goes slower than predicted, Sharp reports to Mission Control that it is unlikely they will reach the depth necessary to split the asteroid before "Zero Barrier", the point after which splitting the rock will not prevent the pieces from hitting Earth. The president of the United States decides to remotely detonate the bomb from Earth immediately, not understanding this will cause total mission failure. Sharp and Harry have a vicious argument, but agree to defuse the bomb and work together after Harry promises Sharp that he will accomplish the mission. They make up on lost drilling time, but a missed gas pocket causes their Armadillo and Max to be blown into space. Just as Harry, NASA, and the world believe the mission to be a failure, and another meteor destroys Paris, A.J. and the others arrive in the second Armadillo.

A.J. successfully finishes the drilling, but a rock storm kills munitions officer Gruber and damages the bomb's remote detonator, forcing someone to stay behind and manually detonate it. They draw straws; A.J. is given the responsibility. Harry takes him down to the asteroid's surface, only to disconnect A.J.'s air hose and force him back into the shuttle's air lock, before telling A.J. that he is the son Harry never had, and he would be proud to have him marry Grace. From within the Armadillo, Harry tearfully gives Grace his blessing to marry A.J., and Grace says she is proud to be his daughter.

After overcoming a malfunction, Freedom takes off and just before Zero Barrier, Harry manages to detonate the bomb and saves the planet, sacrificing his life in the process. The astronauts land on Earth safely. A.J. and Grace are reunited, and Chick reconciles with his ex-wife and estranged son. During the credits, A.J. and Grace are married, with the portraits of Harry, Oscar, Max and Freddie present in memoriam.

== Cast ==
- Bruce Willis as Harry S. Stamper
- Billy Bob Thornton as Dan Truman
- Ben Affleck as A.J. Frost
- Liv Tyler as Grace Stamper
- Will Patton as Chick
- Steve Buscemi as Rockhound
- William Fichtner as Colonel Willie Sharp
- Owen Wilson as Oscar
- Michael Clarke Duncan as Bear
- Peter Stormare as Lev Andropov
- Ken Campbell as Max
- Jessica Steen as Co-Pilot Jennifer Watts
- Keith David as General Kimsey
- Chris Ellis as Flight Director Clark
- Jason Isaacs as Ronald Quincy
- Grayson McCouch as Gruber
- Clark Brolly as Freddie Noonan
- Marshall Teague as Colonel Davis
- Anthony Guidera as Co-Pilot Tucker
- Greg Collins as Halsey
- John Mahon as Karl
- Grace Zabriskie as Dottie
- Eddie Griffin as Bike Messenger
- Jim Ishida as Client #3
- Stanley Anderson as President
- James Harper as Admiral Kelso
- Ellen Cleghorne as Helga the Nurse
- Udo Kier as Psychologist
- John Aylward as Dr. Banks
- Mark Curry as Stu the Cabbie
- Seiko Matsuda as Asian Tourist-Female
- Harry Humphries as Chuck Jr.
- Judith Hoag as Denise
- Steven Ford as Nuke Tech
- Christian Clemenson as Droning Guy
- Michael "Bear" Taliferro as Roughneck #2
- Kathleen Matthews as Newscaster #2
- J.C. Hayward as Newscaster #3
- Andrew Glassman as Newscaster #4
- Shawnee Smith as Redhead
- Dwight Hicks as FBI Agent #1
- Layla Roberts as Molly Mounds
- Bodhi Elfman as Math Guy
- Peter White as Secretary of Defense
- Frederick Weller, Matt Malloy, H. Richard Greene, Peter Murnik, Brian Hayes Currie, Andy Milder, Michael Kaplan as NASA Techs
- Charles Stewart as Vacuum Chamber Tech
- James Fitzpatrick as NORAD Technician
- Narration by Charlton Heston

== Production ==
=== Development ===
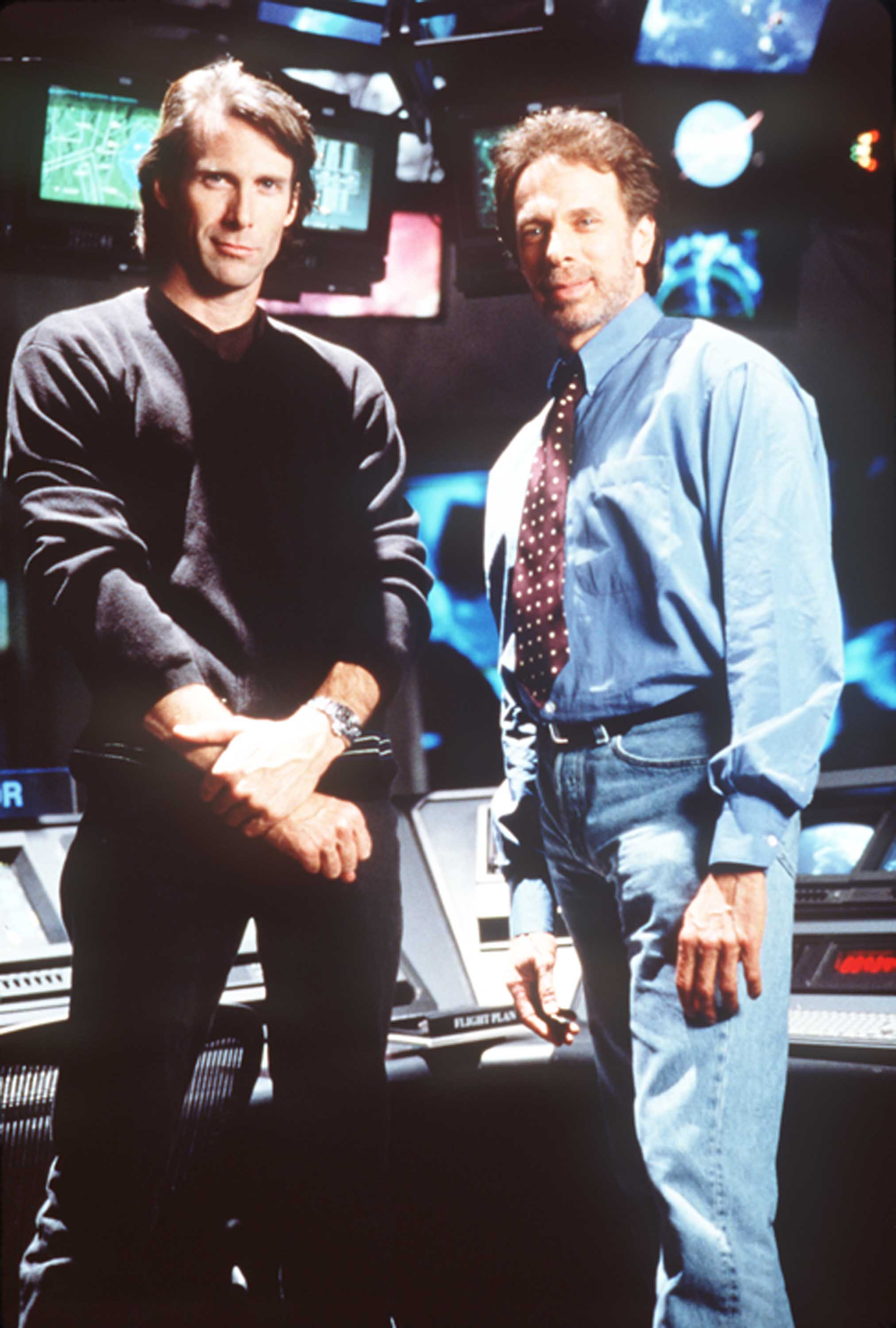
Director Michael Bay and producer Jerry Bruckheimer at Edwards Air Force Base, spring 1998

According to Bruce Joel Rubin, writer of Deep Impact, a production president at Disney took notes on everything said about his script during lunch and initiated Armageddon as a counter film at Disney. Nine writers worked on the script, five of whom are credited. In addition to Robert Roy Pool, Jonathan Hensleigh, Tony Gilroy, Shane Salerno and J. J. Abrams, the writers involved included Paul Attanasio, Ann Biderman, Scott Rosenberg and Robert Towne. Originally, it was Hensleigh's script, based on Pool's original, that had been given the green-light by Touchstone Pictures. Jerry Bruckheimer hired the succession of writers for rewrites and polishes. Michael Bay was chosen to direct the film in January 1997.

Bruce Willis was cast in the film as part of a three-picture deal he cut with the studio to compensate them for the dissolution of 1997's Broadway Brawler. He received a significant pay cut for the picture as part of the deal. Sean Connery was originally considered for the role of Stamper, but Michael Bay decided to cast a younger actor in the role after meeting oil drillers. Bradley Cooper auditioned for the role of A.J. Frost, which eventually went to Ben Affleck.

=== Filming ===
Principal photography for Armageddon began on August 27, 1997 and ended on January 29, 1998. Filming occurred at Culver Studios in Culver City, California. Many cities and landmarks from around the world appear in the film. The crew filmed in several other countries : France (Mont-Saint-Michel, opposite the Notre-Dame du Verger chapel, between Saint-Coulomb and Cancale, Dinan, with several shots filmed in the Place des Cordeliers, facing the convent's distinctive gateway. Impasse Reslou is also visible, as is the Clock Tower, filmed from the street, Paris), India (Agra, the Taj Mahal and the Red Fort), Turkey (Blue Mosque and Ortaköy in Istanbul) and China (Shanghai).

In May 1998, Walt Disney Studios chairman Joe Roth expanded the film's budget by $3 million to include additional special effects scenes by Dream Quest Images showing an asteroid impacting Paris. This additional footage, incorporated two months prior to the film's release, was specifically added for the television advertising campaign to visually differentiate the film from Deep Impact which was released a few months before. At a budget of $140 million, it was Disney's most expensive film at the time.

After filming was complete, according to Home Improvement actor Richard Karn, he stumbled upon the main asteroid set and suggested to Tim Allen that they needed to film on it. According to Karn, Allen asked then ABC executive Bob Iger who then asked Michael Bay for permission. Bay required waiting six months after the film was released. The asteroid set was used as a credit roll gag scene to imitate a cave in Wilson's basement.

== Release ==
=== Marketing ===
Prior to Armageddon's release, the film was advertised in Super Bowl XXXII at a cost of $2.6 million. Several billboards sparked a city-wide panic with its all-too-real ad campaign. The studio also partnered with McDonald's for the tie-in promotion.

=== Home media ===
Despite a mixed critical reception, The Criterion Collection—a specialist film distributor of primarily arthouse films that markets what it considers to be "important classic and contemporary films" and "cinema at its finest"—released the 'directors cut' of the film to DVD and LaserDisc. In an essay supporting the selection of Armageddon, film scholar Jeanine Basinger, who taught Michael Bay at Wesleyan University, states that the film is "a work of art by a cutting-edge artist who is a master of movement, light, color, and shape—and also of chaos, razzle-dazzle, and explosion". She sees it as a celebration of working men: "This film makes these ordinary men noble, lifting their efforts up into an epic event." Further, she states that in the first few moments, all of the main characters are well established, saying, "If that isn't screenwriting, I don't know what is".

The film was also released on VHS and DVD by Buena Vista Home Entertainment on November 13, 1998, and would surpass Pretty Woman to become Buena Vista Home Entertainment's best-selling live-action title. Armageddon then premiered on both VHS and DVD formats on February 1, 1999, in the UK. It was the country's best-selling DVD release at the time, selling over 100,000 copies. However, this record would be surpassed by The Matrix later that year. The film was released on a standard edition Blu-ray on April 27, 2010 with only a few special features. In late November 2024, it was announced that the film would be released on 4K Blu-ray.

=== Television airing ===
By April 2002, ABC airings of Armageddon had already received modifications due to the September 11 attacks that occurred seven months prior. The scene where the World Trade Center was hit by meteors and caught on fire was censored because of its similarity to the September 11 attacks.

Following the 2003 Columbia disaster, some screen captures from the opening scene where Atlantis is destroyed were passed off as satellite images of the disaster in a hoax. Additionally, the American cable network FX, which had intended to broadcast Armageddon that evening, removed the film from its schedule and aired Aliens in its place.

== Reception ==
=== Box office ===
Armageddon was released on July 1, 1998 in 3,127 theaters in the United States and Canada. It ranked first at the box office ahead of Dr. Dolittle with an opening weekend gross of $36 million, combined with $54.2 million from its first five days. Upon opening, the film had the third-highest Fourth of July opening weekend at the time, behind Men in Black and Independence Day. It went on to beat Ransom to achieve the highest opening weekend for a live-action Disney film. That record would only last for four months before being surpassed by The Waterboy that November. The film was overtaken by Lethal Weapon 4 in its second weekend, although it collected a total of $23.5 million. During its fourth weekend, it surpassed its rival Deep Impact to become the highest-grossing domestic release of the year. The film grossed $201.6 million in the United States and Canada and $352.1 million in other territories for a worldwide total of $553.7 million. It was the highest-grossing film of 1998 worldwide and the second-highest-grossing film of that year in the United States, finishing just behind Saving Private Ryan.

In South Korea, Armageddon surpassed Godzilla to have the country's highest opening, making $2.7 million. In Australia, it made $3.5 million during its opening weekend, the highest for a Disney film, surpassing Ransom. The film topped the box office for two weekends until it was beaten by There's Something About Mary. It recorded the second-highest opening in Taiwan with $1 million, behind The Lost World: Jurassic Park. The film would spend a total of thirteen weeks in Japan's number one spot until it was surpassed by A Bug's Life.

=== Critical response ===
Armageddon received mixed reviews from film critics, many of whom took issue with "the furious pace of its editing". On the review aggregator website Rotten Tomatoes, the film has a 42% approval rating based on 177 reviews, with an average rating of 5.3/10. The critical consensus states, "Lovely to look at but about as intelligent as the asteroid that serves as the movie's antagonist, Armageddon slickly sums up the cinematic legacies of producer Jerry Bruckheimer and director Michael Bay." Metacritic gave the film a weighted average score of 42 out of 100, based on 23 critics, indicating "mixed or average" reviews. Audiences polled by CinemaScore gave the film an average grade of "A−" on an A+ to F scale.

A rough assemblage of footage from the film was shown in the marketplace at the 1998 Cannes Film Festival in May. The footage reportedly generated unintentional laughs from journalists who viewed it.

Janet Maslin of The New York Times said, "A real movie about courage in space is Apollo 13, in which fear and sacrifice have meaning. This jingoistic, overblown spectacle is about whistling in the dark." Dennis King of Tulsa World gave the film a two out of four rating, describing it as "overproduced, overblown, overhyped and just plain exhausting. And as storytelling goes, it's about as satisfying as staring at a video game screen while someone else controls the joystick." Stephen Hunter of The Washington Post wrote, "So predictable it could have been written by a chimp who's watched too much TV, the huge movie is as dumb as it is loud, and it's way too loud. Watching it is like putting your head in a tin washbucket while weightlifters whack it with golf clubs."

The film is on the list of Roger Ebert's most hated films. In his original review, Ebert gave the film 1 star and stated, "The movie is an assault on the eyes, the ears, the brain, common sense and the human desire to be entertained". On At the Movies, Ebert gave it a Thumbs Down. However, his co-host Gene Siskel gave it a Thumbs Up, commenting on the noise and intensity of the film, but also stating that he found the film to be amusing. Ebert went on to name Armageddon as the worst film of 1998 (though he was originally considering Spice World). Todd McCarthy of Variety also gave the film a negative review, noting Michael Bay's rapid cutting style: "Much of the confusion, as well as the lack of dramatic rhythm or character development, results directly from Bay's cutting style, which resembles a machine gun stuck in the firing position for 2 1/2 hours."

In April 2013, in a Miami Herald interview to promote Pain & Gain, Bay was quoted as having said:

…We had to do the whole movie in 16 weeks. It was a massive undertaking. That was not fair to the movie. I would redo the entire third act if I could. But the studio literally took the movie away from us. It was terrible. My visual effects supervisor had a nervous breakdown, so I had to be in charge of that. I called James Cameron and asked "What do you do when you're doing all the effects yourself?" But the movie did fine.

Some time after the article was published, Bay changed his stance, claiming that his apology only related to the editing of the film, not the whole film, and accused the writer of the article for taking his words out of context. The author of the article, Miami Herald writer Rene Rodriguez, claimed: "NBC asked me for a response, and I played them the tape. I didn't misquote anyone. All the sites that picked up the story did."

=== Scientific accuracy ===
In an interview with Entertainment Weekly, Bay admitted that the film's central premise "that NASA could actually do something in a situation like this" was unrealistic. Additionally, the largest known potentially hazardous asteroid (PHA) is (53319) 1999 JM8, which is only 7 kilometres (4.3 mi) in diameter, while the asteroid in the movie is described as being "the size of Texas". Near the end of the credits, there is a disclaimer stating, "The National Aeronautics and Space Administration's cooperation and assistance does not reflect an endorsement of the contents of the film or the treatment of the characters depicted therein." Astronomers would subsequently note that Deep Impact was more scientifically accurate.

The infeasibility of the H-bomb approach was published by four physics postdocs in 2011 and then reported by The Daily Telegraph in 2012:

A mathematical analysis of the situation found that for Willis's approach to be effective, he would need to be in possession of an H-bomb a billion times stronger than the Soviet Union's "Big Ivan", the biggest ever detonated on Earth. Using estimates of the asteroid's size, density, speed and distance from Earth based on information in the film, the postgraduate students from Leicester University found that to split the asteroid in two, with both pieces clearing Earth, would require 800 trillion terajoules of energy. In contrast, the total energy output of "Big Ivan", which was tested by the Soviet Union in 1961, was only 418,000 terajoules.

In the commentary track, Ben Affleck says he "asked Michael why it was easier to train oil drillers to become astronauts than it was to train astronauts to become oil drillers, and he told me to shut the fuck up, so that was the end of that talk."

Neil deGrasse Tyson said on the October 2, 2023 episode of The Late Show with Stephen Colbert that, until the release of the 2022 film Moonfall, Armageddon was the movie which violated more laws of physics per minute than any other movie ever.

=== Accolades ===
Award	Category	Recipient	Result	Ref.
Academy Awards	Best Original Song	"I Don't Want to Miss a Thing"; Music and Lyrics by Diane Warren	Nominated	
Academy Awards	Best Sound	Kevin O'Connell, Greg P. Russell, and Keith A. Wester	Nominated	
Academy Awards	Best Sound Effects Editing	George Watters II	Nominated	
Academy Awards	Best Visual Effects	Richard R. Hoover, Patrick McClung, and John Frazier	Nominated	
American Music Awards	Top Soundtrack	Armageddon: The Album	Nominated	
ASCAP Film and Television Music Awards	Most Performed Songs from a Motion Picture	"I Don't Want to Miss a Thing" – Diane Warren	Won	
Awards Circuit Community Awards	Best Achievement in Sound		Nominated	
Awards Circuit Community Awards	Best Visual Effects		Nominated	
Blockbuster Entertainment Awards	Favorite Actor – Sci-Fi	Bruce Willis	Won	
Blockbuster Entertainment Awards	Favorite Actress – Sci-Fi	Liv Tyler	Nominated	
Blockbuster Entertainment Awards	Favorite Supporting Actor – Sci-Fi	Ben Affleck	Won	
Blockbuster Entertainment Awards	Favorite Supporting Actor – Sci-Fi	Billy Bob Thornton	Nominated	
Blockbuster Entertainment Awards	Favorite Soundtrack	Armageddon: The Album	Nominated	
BMI Film & TV Awards	Best Music	Trevor Rabin	Won	
Bogey Awards			Won	
Cinema Audio Society Awards	Outstanding Achievement in Sound Mixing for Motion Pictures	Kevin O'Connell, Greg P. Russell, and Keith A. Wester	Nominated	
Golden Raspberry Awards	Worst Picture	Jerry Bruckheimer, Gale Anne Hurd, and Michael Bay	Nominated	
Golden Raspberry Awards	Worst Director	Michael Bay	Nominated	
Golden Raspberry Awards	Worst Actor	Bruce Willis (Also for Mercury Rising and The Siege)	Won	
Golden Raspberry Awards	Worst Supporting Actress	Liv Tyler	Nominated	
Golden Raspberry Awards	Worst Screenplay	Screenplay by Jonathan Hensleigh and J. J. Abrams; Story by Robert Roy Pool and Jonathan Hensleigh; Adaptation by Tony Gilroy and Shane Salerno	Nominated	
Golden Raspberry Awards	Worst Screen Couple	Ben Affleck and Liv Tyler	Nominated	
Golden Raspberry Awards	Worst Original Song	"I Don't Want to Miss a Thing"; Music and Lyrics by Diane Warren	Nominated	
Golden Reel Awards	Best Sound Editing – Dialogue & ADR	George Watters II, Teri E. Dorman, Juno J. Ellis, Gloria D'Alessandro, Alison Fisher, Carin Rogers, Karen Spangenberg, Mary Andrews, Andrea Horta, Denise Horta, Stephen Janisz, Nicholas Korda, and Denise Whiting	Nominated	
Golden Reel Awards	Best Sound Editing – Sound Effects & Foley	Kevin O'Connell, Greg P. Russell, and Keith A. Wester	Nominated	
Golden Reel Awards	Best Sound Editing – Music (Foreign & Domestic)	Bob Badami, Will Kaplan, Shannon Erbe, and Mark Jan Wlodarkiewicz	Nominated	
Golden Screen Awards			Won	
Golden Trailer Awards	Golden Fleece		Nominated	
Grammy Awards	Best Song Written for a Motion Picture, Television or Other Visual Media	"I Don't Want to Miss A Thing" – Diane Warren	Nominated	
Japan Academy Film Prize	Outstanding Foreign Language Film		Nominated	
MTV Movie Awards	Best Movie		Nominated	
MTV Movie Awards	Best Male Performance	Ben Affleck	Nominated	
MTV Movie Awards	Best Female Performance	Liv Tyler	Nominated	
MTV Movie Awards	Best On-Screen Duo	Ben Affleck and Liv Tyler	Nominated	
MTV Movie Awards	Best Song from a Movie	Aerosmith – "I Don't Want to Miss a Thing"	Won	
MTV Movie Awards	Best Action Sequence	Asteroid Destroys New York City	Won	
MTV Video Music Awards	Best Video from a Film	Aerosmith – "I Don't Want to Miss a Thing"	Won	
Online Film & Television Association Awards	Best Original Song	"I Don't Want to Miss a Thing"; Music and Lyrics by Diane Warren	Nominated	
Online Film & Television Association Awards	Best Adapted Song	"Leaving on a Jet Plane"; Music and Lyrics by John Denver	Nominated	
Online Film & Television Association Awards	Best Sound Effects Editing	George Watters II	Nominated	
Online Film & Television Association Awards	Best Visual Effects	Richard R. Hoover, Patrick McClung, and John Frazier	Nominated	
Satellite Awards	Best Original Song	"I Don't Want to Miss a Thing"; Music and Lyrics by Diane Warren	Won	
Satellite Awards	Best Visual Effects	Richard R. Hoover, Pat McClung, and John Frazier	Nominated	
Saturn Awards	Best Science Fiction Film		Won (Note: Tied with Dark City.)	
Saturn Awards	Best Director	Michael Bay	Won	
Saturn Awards	Best Actor	Bruce Willis	Nominated	
Saturn Awards	Best Supporting Actor	Ben Affleck	Nominated	
Saturn Awards	Best Costumes	Michael Kaplan and Magali Guidasci	Nominated	
Saturn Awards	Best Music	Trevor Rabin	Nominated	
Saturn Awards	Best Special Effects	Richard R. Hoover, Pat McClung, and John Frazier	Nominated	
Stinkers Bad Movie Awards	Worst Actor	Bruce Willis	Won	
Stinkers Bad Movie Awards	Worst Supporting Actress	Liv Tyler	Nominated	
Stinkers Bad Movie Awards	Worst Screenplay for a Film Grossing Over $100M Worldwide Using Hollywood Math	Screenplay by Jonathan Hensleigh and J. J. Abrams; Story by Robert Roy Pool and Jonathan Hensleigh	Nominated	
Stinkers Bad Movie Awards	Worst On-Screen Couple	Ben Affleck and Liv Tyler	Won	
Stinkers Bad Movie Awards	Most Annoying Fake Accent	Bruce Willis	Nominated	
Teen Choice Awards	Choice Movie Actor	Ben Affleck	Nominated	

== Other media ==
=== Merchandising ===
Revell and Monogram released two model kits inspired by the film's spacecraft and the Armadillos, in 1998. The first one, "Space Shuttle with Armadillo drilling unit", included an X-71, a small, rough Armadillo and a pedestal. The second one, "Russian Space Center", included the Mir, with the docking adapter seen in the film, and another pedestal.

In 2011, Fantastic Plastic released another X-71 kit, the "X-71 Super Shuttle", the goal of which was to be more accurate than the Revell/Monogram kit.

=== Theme park attraction ===
Armageddon – Les Effets Speciaux was an attraction based on Armageddon at Walt Disney Studios Park located at Disneyland Paris. It opened in time for the park's premiere on March 16, 2002, being a debut attraction. The attraction simulated the scene in the movie in which the Russian Space Station is destroyed. Michael Clarke Duncan ("Bear" in the film) was featured in the pre-show. The attraction operated until 2019 when it was torn down to make way for Spider-Man W.E.B Adventure.

== See also ==
- Deep Impact, another impact event-based film released in 1998.
- Impact event
- Impact events in fiction
- Impact crater
- Asteroid deflection strategies
- List of disaster films
- List of films featuring space stations
- Hollywood Science

== Bibliography ==
- Lichtenfeld, Eric (2007). Action Speaks Louder: Violence, Spectacle, and the American Action Movie. Middletown, Connecticut: Wesleyan University Press. ISBN 978-0-8195-6801-4. OCLC 636164671.
