= ETN =

ETN may refer to:

- Chim-Nir Aviation, an Israeli airline whose ICAO designator is ETN
- Eastern Television Network, in Somalia
- Eaton Corporation, an American industrial manufacturer
- Erie Times-News, a daily newspaper in Erie, Pennsylvania
- Erythema toxicum neonatorum
- Erythritol tetranitrate
- E.T.N.: The Extraterrestrial Nasty, a 1967 American horror film
- Eton language (Vanuatu)
- Europe Trust Netherlands
- Exchange-traded note
