= 1998 Stinkers Bad Movie Awards =

Award ceremony presented by the Stinkers Bad Movie Awards in 1998

21st Stinkers Bad Movie Awards
- Date: 1999

Highlights
- Worst Film: Spice World
- Most awards: Armageddon, The Avengers, Godzilla, and Spice World (2)
- Most nominations: The Avengers (8)

The 21st Stinkers Bad Movie Awards were released by the Hastings Bad Cinema Society in 1999 to honor the worst films the film industry had to offer in 1998.

According to founders Ray Wright and Mike Lancaster, they were quite surprised by how The Avengers lost to Spice World in the run for Worst Picture. They also stated that while pressured to include Armageddon and Godzilla on the Worst Picture ballot, they ultimately felt that Blues Brothers 2000 was more deserving. They then admitted that if they expanded the Worst Picture category to ten films, they would have added Armaggeddon, Babe: Pig in the City, Godzilla, Krippendorf's Tribe, and Meet the Deedles to the ballot. Lancaster put Lost in Space as the one 1998 film among his five worst movies of the 1990s, alongside It's Pat, Kids, Nothing but Trouble, and Ready to Wear.

Listed as follows are the different categories with their respective winners and nominees, including Worst Picture and its dishonorable mentions, which are films that were considered for Worst Picture but ultimately failed to make the final ballot (39 total). All winners are highlighted.

== Winners and Nominees ==
=== Worst Picture ===
Film	Production company(s)	Percentage of Votes
Spice World	Columbia	44%
An Alan Smithee Film: Burn Hollywood Burn	Hollywood Pictures	9%
The Avengers	Warner Bros.	25%
Blues Brothers 2000	Universal Pictures	10%
Lost in Space	New Line Cinema	12%

==== Dishonorable Mentions ====
- Air Bud: Golden Receiver (Dimension)
- Armageddon (Touchstone)
- Babe: Pig in the City (Universal)
- Barney's Great Adventure (PolyGram)
- BASEketball (Universal)
- Blade (New Line)
- Chairman of the Board (Trimark)
- Deep Impact (Paramount)
- Fear and Loathing in Las Vegas (Universal)
- 54 (Miramax)
- Godzilla (aka "Godawful") (TriStar)
- Great Expectations (Fox)
- He Got Game (Touchstone)
- Hope Floats (Fox)
- Hush (TriStar)
- I Still Know What You Did Last Summer (Columbia)
- Kissing a Fool (Universal)
- Krippendorf's Tribe (Touchstone)
- Lethal Weapon 4 (Warner Bros.)
- Major League: Back to the Minors (Warner Bros.)
- The Man in the Iron Mask (United Artists)
- Meet Joe Black (Universal)
- Meet the Deedles (Disney)
- The Odd Couple II (Paramount)
- Patch Adams (Universal)
- Psycho (the shot-for-shot remake) (Universal)
- The Replacement Killers (Columbia)
- Six Days, Seven Nights (Touchstone)
- Slappy and the Stinkers (TriStar)
- Snake Eyes (Paramount)
- Species II (MGM)
- Sphere (Warner Bros.)
- Tarzan and the Lost City (Warner Bros.)
- The Thin Red Line (Fox)
- 3 Ninjas: High Noon at Mega Mountain (TriStar)
- U.S. Marshals (Warner Bros.)
- John Carpenter's Vampires (Columbia)
- The Waterboy (Touchstone)
- Wrongfully Accused (Warner Bros.)

=== Worst Director ===
Recipient	Percentage of Votes
Jeremiah Chechik for The Avengers	33%
Arthur Hiller for An Alan Smithee Film: Burn Hollywood Burn	16%
Stephen Hopkins for Lost in Space	12%
Spike Lee for He Got Game	10%
Bob Spiers for Spice World	29%

=== Worst Actor ===
Recipient	Percentage of Votes
Bruce Willis for Armageddon	37%
Barney the Dinosaur for Barney's Great Adventure	30%
Richard Dreyfuss for Krippendorf's Tribe	13%
Ralph Fiennes for The Avengers	11%
Wesley Snipes for Blade	9%

=== Worst Actress or British Singing Group Pretending to Act ===
Recipient	Percentage of Votes
Spice Girls for Spice World	53%
Anne Heche for Six Days, Seven Nights and Psycho	24%
Jessica Lange for Hush	5%
Sharon Stone for Sphere	8%
Uma Thurman for The Avengers	10%

=== Worst Supporting Actor ===
Recipient	Percentage of Votes
Daniel Baldwin for John Carpenter's Vampires	37%
Sean Connery for The Avengers	7%
Benicio Del Toro for Fear and Loathing in Las Vegas	23%
Dennis Hopper for Meet the Deedles	27%
John Malkovich for The Man in the Iron Mask	6%

=== Worst Supporting Actress ===
Recipient	Percentage of Votes
Lacey Chabert for Lost in Space	33%
Anne Bancroft for Great Expectations	10%
Neve Campbell for 54 and Wild Things	27%
Téa Leoni for Deep Impact	16%
Liv Tyler for Armageddon	14%

=== Worst Sequel ===
Recipient	Percentage of Votes
I Still Know What You Did Last Summer (Columbia)	31%
Blues Brothers 2000 (Universal)	21%
The Odd Couple II (Paramount)	15%
Species II (MGM)	19%
U.S. Marshals (Warner Bros.)	14%

=== Worst Screenplay for a Film Grossing Over $100M Worldwide Using Hollywood Math ===
Recipient	Percentage of Votes
Godzilla (TriStar), story by Ted Elliot, Terry Rossio, Dean Devlin, and Roland Emmerich; screenplay by Devlin and Emmerich; based on Toho's Godzilla franchise	41%
Armageddon (Touchstone), story by Robert Roy Pool and Jonathan Hensleigh; screenplay by Hensleigh and J. J. Abrams	24%
Deep Impact (Paramount), written by Bruce Joel Rubin and Michael Tolkin	7%
Lethal Weapon 4 (Warner Bros.), story by Jonathan Lemkin, Alfred Gough, and Miles Millar; screenplay by Channing Gibson; based on characters created by Shane Black	12%
Patch Adams (Universal), written by Steve Oedekerk; based on Gesundheit: Good Health Is a Laughing Matter by Patch Adams and Maureen Mylander	16%

=== Worst Resurrection of a TV Show ===
Recipient	Percentage of Votes
The Avengers (Warner Bros.)	51%
Barney's Great Adventure (PolyGram)	24%
Lost in Space (New Line)	25%

=== Worst On-Screen Couple ===
Recipient	Percentage of Votes
Ben Affleck and Liv Tyler in Armageddon	26%
Johnny Depp and Benicio Del Toro in Fear and Loathing in Las Vegas	20%
Ralph Fiennes and Uma Thurman in The Avengers	17%
Mira Sorvino and Chow Yun-Fat in The Replacement Killers	13%
Steve Van Wormer and Paul Walker in Meet the Deedles	24%

=== The Sequel Nobody Was Clamoring For ===
Recipient	Percentage of Votes
Major League: Back to the Minors (Warner Bros.)	27%
Air Bud: Golden Receiver (Dimension)	22%
Babe: Pig in the City (Universal)	14%
Blues Brothers 2000 (Universal)	12%
3 Ninjas: High Noon at Mega Mountain (TriStar)	25%

=== Most Annoying Fake Accent ===
Recipient	Percentage of Votes
Adam Sandler in The Waterboy	37%
Sandra Bullock in Hope Floats	22%
Uma Thurman in The Avengers	8%
Casper Van Dien in Tarzan and the Lost City	14%
Bruce Willis in Armageddon	19%

=== Most Painfully Unfunny Comedy ===
Recipient	Percentage of Votes
Meet the Deedles (Disney)	33%
An Alan Smithee Film: Burn Hollywood Burn (Hollywood Pictures)	20%
Chairman of the Board (Trimark Pictures)	18%
The Odd Couple II (Paramount)	24%
Wrongfully Accused (Warner Bros.)	5%

=== Most Unwelcome Direct-to-Video Release ===
Recipient	Percentage of Votes
Bill Clinton's Grand Jury Testimony	55%
Addams Family Reunion	16%
Casper Meets Wendy	2%
Ernest in the Army	24%
The Land Before Time VI	3%

=== Worst Song in a Motion Picture ===
Recipient	Percentage of Votes
"Come with Me" by Puff Daddy with Jimmy Page from Godzilla	37%
"I Love You" by Barney the Dinosaur from Barney's Great Adventure	24%
"Lost in Space" by Space from Lost in Space	6%
"Spice Up Your Life" by the Spice Girls from Spice World	15%
"When You Believe" by Mariah Carey and Whitney Houston from The Prince of Egypt	18%

=== Worst On-Screen Hairstyle ===
Recipient	Percentage of Votes
Joe Eszterhas in An Alan Smithee Film: Burn Hollywood Burn	32%
Jason Lee in Kissing a Fool	4%
Brad Pitt in Meet Joe Black	26%
Scary Spice in Spice World	30%
Sharon Stone in Sphere	8%

=== The Founders Award - What Were They Thinking and Why? ===
- The Academy of Motion Pictures Arts and Sciences for honoring Elia Kazan with a Lifetime Achievement Award
- The Motion Picture Association of America for rating Babe: Pig in the City "G" and Orgazmo "NC-17"
- Universal Pictures for thinking Psycho was a good idea in the first place

=== Miscellaneous Awards ===
- Worst TV Show: The Magic Hour
- Worst Album: Wild Prairie by Mariah Carey
- Worst Radio Show (Syndicated): Delilah @ RadioDelilah.com

== Films with multiple nominations and wins ==
The following films received multiple nominations:

Nominations	Film
8	The Avengers
5	Armageddon
5	Lost in Space
5	Spice World
4	An Alan Smithee Film: Burn Hollywood Burn
3	Barney's Great Adventure
3	Blues Brothers 2000
3	Meet the Deedles
2	Babe: Pig in the City*
2	Deep Impact
2	Fear and Loathing in Las Vegas
2	Godzilla
2	The Odd Couple II
2	Psycho*
2	Sphere

- Note: For each film with an asterisk, one of those nominations was the Founders Award.

The following films received multiple awards:

Wins	Film
2	Armageddon
2	The Avengers
2	Godzilla
2	Spice World
