= Blue Mosque, Amsterdam =

Mosque in Amsterdam, North Holland, Netherlands

Blue Mosque
- Blauwe Moskee
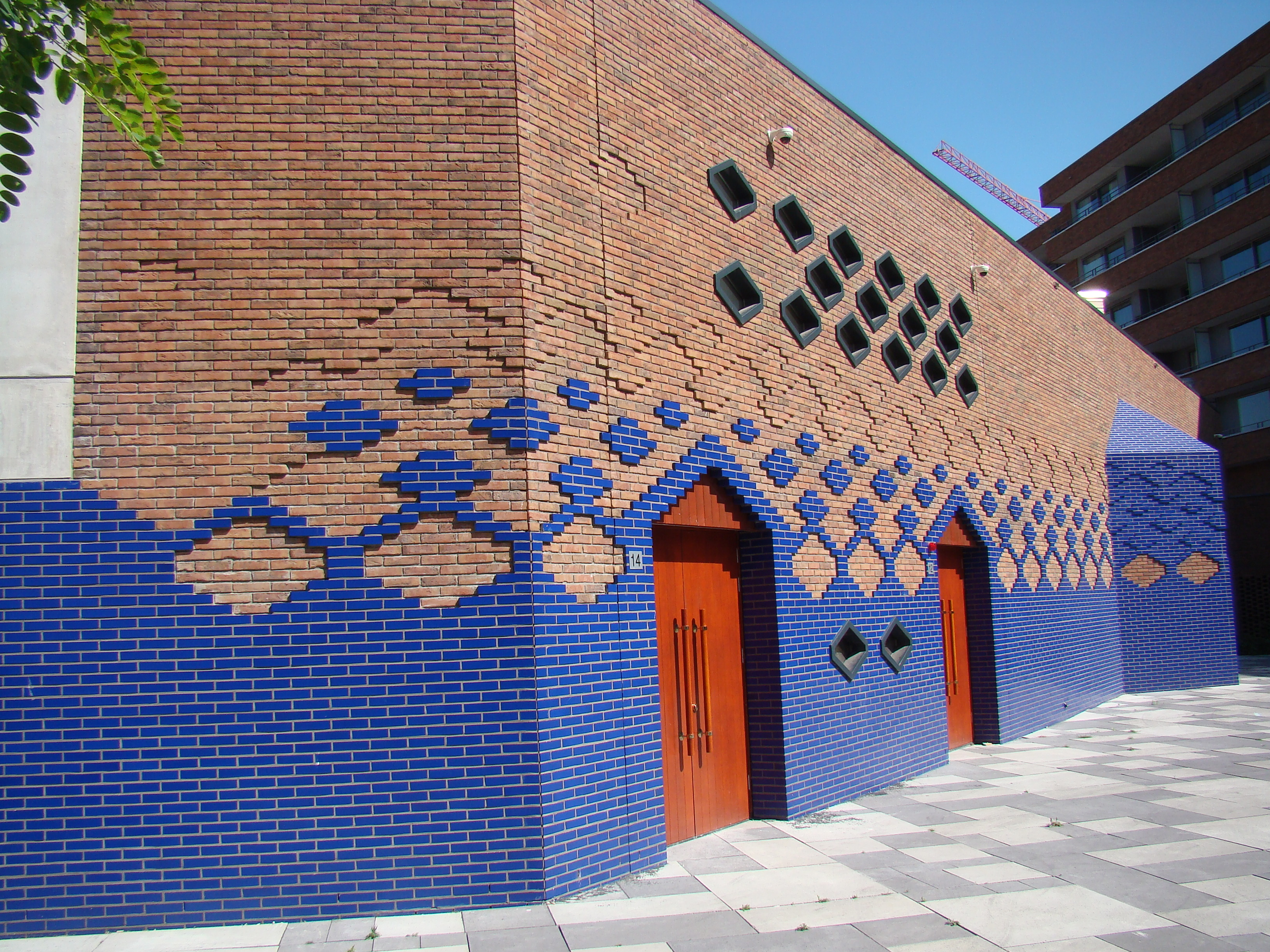

Location
- Location: Amsterdam Nieuw-West, Amsterdam, North Holland, Netherlands
- Interactive map of Blue Mosque
- Coordinates: 52.3486°N 4.8314°E

Architecture
- Groundbreaking: 2008
- Interior area: 790 m^{2}

The Blue Mosque (Dutch: Blauwe Moskee) is a mosque and cultural center in Amsterdam Nieuw-West, the Netherlands. Construction of the mosque was financed by the government of Kuwait through the offices of Europe Trust Netherlands and began in 2008. The mosque is architecturally significant for both its blue color and the fact that the structure lacks traditional minarets and other symbols associated with Muslim places of worship.

== Architecture ==
The Blue Mosque mixes traditional and modern architecture and is two storeys in height. The mosque cover 790 square metres (8,500 sq ft) and is built of blue bricks. Unlike many traditional mosques, the Blue Mosque lacks a loudspeaker used to broadcast the call to prayer. The mosque consists of a room for prayer, five Islamic education class rooms, a room for lectures, and two meeting rooms.

== Vision ==
The Blue Mosque prides itself on being both “progressive and modern,” aiming to counter fundamentalism and provide youth with a modern and moderate version of Islam. The Blue Mosque is a place of spiritual peace and reconciliation where the focus is on similarities rather than differences. The mosque aims to be a place where everyone is welcome regardless of their age, gender, or religion. The mosque works to build bridges with their community in Amsterdam and society at large. They aim to be a guide for youth and to stimulate debate. The official language of the mosque is Dutch.

== Management ==
General management of the mosque is voluntary. The board members meet once a month to arrange details in and outside the mosque. The board has the right to refuse entry to anyone who behaves in an undesirable manner. The mosque is non-smoking and cell phones are not allowed during prayer services.

== Controversy ==
Concern has been expressed over the fact that The Blue Mosque was founded by members of the Muslim Brotherhood. The director of the Europe Trust in the UK, Muslim Brotherhood member Ahmed al-Rawi, is said to have founded the mosque and continues to influence the mosque in both financial and ideological matters.

Further concern has been expressed over the fact that public speakers at the mosque have included Mahmoud al-Masri, an anti-Semite Egyptian Imam banned in France, and radical and salafi preachers like Remy Soekirman and Sheik Khalid Yasin.

Dutch citizens in Amsterdam filed a petition against the fact that the mosque functions under the authority of the Kuwaiti Ministry of Religious Affairs in general and specifically under Kuwaiti Muslim Brotherhood member Dr. Mutlaq Rashid Alkarawi. According to the newspaper Het Parool, the Kuwaiti Ministry of Islamic Affairs is not only financing operations but also paying the salaries of preachers and leaders of the Blue Mosque.
