= List of 1995 box office number-one films in Italy =

This is a list of films which have placed number one at the box office in Italy during 1995. Amounts are in lire.

== Number one films ==
†	This implies the highest-grossing movie of the year.

#	Weekend ending	Film	Box office	Notes	Ref
1	1 January 1995	The Lion King	₤2,543,291,200		
2	8 January 1995	S.P.Q.R.: 2,000 and a Half Years Ago	₤3,605,969,600	S.P.Q.R.: 2,000 and a Half Years Ago reached number one in its fourth week of release	
3	15 January 1995	The Mask	₤2,343,849,600		
4	22 January 1995	Stargate †	₤2,870,197,250		
5	29 January 1995	Stargate †	₤3,547,974,950		
6	5 February 1995	Stargate †	₤3,562,455,050		
7	12 February 1995	Stargate †	₤2,439,756,970		
8	19 February 1995	Mary Shelley's Frankenstein	₤1,333,128,000	Mary Shelley's Frankenstein reached number one in its second week of release	
9	26 February 1995	Nell	₤1,379,792,000	Nell reached number one in its second week of release	
10	5 March 1995	Nell	₤1,473,457,600		
11	12 March 1995	Men Men Men	₤1,170,649,600	Men Men Men reached number one in its second week of release	
12	19 March 1995	Prêt-à-Porter	₤1,760,526,400		
13	26 March 1995	Prêt-à-Porter	₤1,066,444,800	Key cities only	
14	2 April 1995	Forrest Gump	₤1,121,843,200	Forrest Gump reached number one in its 24th week of release. Key cities only	
15	9 April 1995	Léon: The Professional	₤997,404,800	Key cities only	
16	16 April 1995	Léon: The Professional	₤1,384,025,600	Key cities only	
17	23 April 1995	Léon: The Professional	₤1,213,740,800	Key cities only	
18	30 April 1995	La scuola	₤952,849,600	Key cities only. La scuola reached number one in its fourth weekend	
19	7 May 1995	La scuola	₤545,561,600	Key cities only	
20	14 May 1995	La scuola	₤597,350,400	Key cities only	
21	21 May 1995	The Road to Wellville	₤583,020,800	Key cities only. The Road to Wellville reached number one in its second week of release	
22	28 May 1995	L'amore molesto	₤318,099,200	Key cities only. L'amore molesto reached number one in its seventh week of release	
23	4 June 1995	The Quick and the Dead	₤630,764,800	Key cities only	
24	11 June 1995	The Quick and the Dead	₤442,718,400	Key cities only	
25	18 June 1995	An Awfully Big Adventure	₤116,584,000	Key cities only. An Awfully Big Adventure reached number one in its second week of release	
26	25 June 1995	TBD			
27	2 July 1995	TBD			
28	9 July 1995	TBD			
29	16 July 1995	TBD			
30	23 July 1995	TBD			
31	30 July 1995	TBD			
32	6 August 1995	TBD			
33	13 August 1995	TBD			
34	20 August 1995	TBD			
35	27 August 1995	TBD			
36	3 September 1995	Dumb and Dumber	₤2,384,558,400	Key cities only	
37	10 September 1995	Dumb and Dumber	₤2,297,073,600	Key cities only	
38	17 September 1995	Waterworld	₤2,743,899,200	Key cities only	
39	24 September 1995	Waterworld	₤2,143,148,800	Key cities only	
40	1 October 1995	First Knight	₤1,998,387,200	Key cities only. First Knight reached number one in its second week of release	
41	8 October 1995	Batman Forever	₤1,962,409,600	Key cities only	
42	15 October 1995	Apollo 13	₤2,300,868,800	Key cities only	
43	22 October 1995	Apollo 13	₤2,182,001,600	Key cities only	
44	29 October 1995	Die Hard with a Vengeance	₤1,595,204,800	Key cities only. Die Hard with a Vengeance reached number one in its second week of release	
45	5 November 1995	Die Hard with a Vengeance	₤1,285,616,000	Key cities only	
46	12 November 1995	I Don't Speak English	₤998,070,400	Key cities only. I Don't Speak English reached number one in its third week of release	
47	19 November 1995	Mortal Kombat	₤1,582,796,800	Key cities only. Mortal Kombat reached number one in its second week of release	
48	26 November 1995	Pocahontas	₤1,853,171,200	Key cities only	
49	3 December 1995	Pocahontas	₤2,448,880,000	Key cities only	
50	10 December 1995	Pocahontas	₤3,579,696,000	Key cities only	
51	17 December 1995	Pocahontas	TBD		
52	24 December 1995	Viaggi di nozze	₤2,249,512,000	Key cities only	
53	31 December 1995	Viaggi di nozze	₤2,686,648,000	Key cities only	

== Highest-grossing films ==
Rank	Title	Distributor	Gross (₤m)
1.	Stargate	Medusa	20,668
2.	Pocahontas	Buena Vista International	17,997
3.	Disclosure	Warner Bros.	13,763
4.	Viaggi di nozze	Warner Bros./Cecchi Gori	13,427
5.	The Mask	Cecchi Gori	11,889
6.	Dumb and Dumber	Warner Bros./Cecchi Gori	11,270
7.	Apollo 13	UIP	11,017
8.	Vacanze di Natale '95	Filmauro	10,860
9.	First Knight	Columbia TriStar	10,822
10.	Waterworld	UIP	10,297

== See also ==
- Lists of box office number-one films

== Chronology ==
Preceded by 1994	1995
