= Deep Impact (film) =

1998 science fiction disaster film directed by Mimi Leder

- Theatrical release poster
- Directed by: Mimi Leder
- Written by: Bruce Joel Rubin; Michael Tolkin
- Produced by: David Brown; Richard D. Zanuck
- Starring: Robert Duvall; Téa Leoni; Elijah Wood; Vanessa Redgrave; Maximilian Schell; Morgan Freeman
- Cinematography: Dietrich Lohmann
- Edited by: Paul Cichocki; David Rosenbloom
- Music by: James Horner
- Production companies: Amblin Entertainment; The Manhattan Project; Zanuck/Brown Productions
- Distributed by: Paramount Pictures (United States and Canada); DreamWorks Pictures (through United International Pictures; international)
- Release date: May 8, 1998
- Running time: 121 minutes
- Country: United States
- Language: English
- Budget: $80 million
- Box office: $349.5 million

Deep Impact is a 1998 American science fiction disaster film directed by Mimi Leder, written by Bruce Joel Rubin and Michael Tolkin, and starring Robert Duvall, Téa Leoni, Elijah Wood, Vanessa Redgrave, Maximilian Schell, and Morgan Freeman. Steven Spielberg served as an executive producer of this film. It was released by Paramount Pictures in the United States and Canada, and by DreamWorks Pictures through United International Pictures internationally on May 8, 1998. The film depicts humanity's attempts to prepare for and destroy a 7-mile (11 km) wide comet set to collide with Earth and cause a mass extinction.

Deep Impact was released in the same summer as the similarly themed Armageddon, which fared better at the box office, while astronomers described Deep Impact as being more accurate. Deep Impact was slightly better received critically than Armageddon, although both ultimately received mixed reviews. Deep Impact grossed over $349.5 million worldwide on an $80 million production budget, becoming the sixth highest-grossing film of 1998.

It was the final film by cinematographer Dietrich Lohmann, who died before the film's release.

== Plot ==
On May 10, 1998, in Richmond, Virginia, high school student Leo Biederman observes an unidentified object in the night sky at his astronomy club's star party. His picture is sent to astronomer Marcus Wolf, who realizes it is a comet on a collision course with Earth. Wolf dies in a car crash while racing to raise the alarm.

In 1999, MSNBC reporter Jenny Lerner investigates Secretary of the Treasury, Alan Rittenhouse, over his connection with a woman named "Ellie," whom she assumes to be a mistress; she is confused when she finds him and his daughter, Lilly, loading a boat with large amounts of food and survival gear. The FBI apprehends Lerner and takes her to meet President Tom Beck, who persuades her not to share the story in return for a prominent role in the press conference he will arrange. She subsequently discovers that "Ellie" is actually an acronym—E.L.E.—which stands for, "extinction-level event." Two days later, Beck announces that the Wolf–Biederman comet is on course to impact the Earth in roughly one year, and could cause humanity's extinction. He reveals that the United States and Russia have been constructing the Messiah in orbit, a spacecraft to transport a team to alter the comet's path with nuclear bombs.

The Messiah later launches, with a crew of five American astronauts, and one Russian cosmonaut. They land on the outermost layer of the comet, and drill the nuclear bombs deep beneath its surface, but it shifts into the sunlight. Consequently, Mission Commander Oren Monash is blinded, and an explosive release of gas propels medical officer Gus Partenza into space. The remaining crew escape, and detonate the bombs. However, rather than deflect the comet, the bombs split it in two. Beck announces the mission's failure, and that both pieces—the larger now named Wolf and the smaller named Biederman—are still headed for Earth. Wolf is on a collision course with western Canada, and its impact is expected to fill the atmosphere with dust, blocking all sunlight for two years and creating an impact winter that will kill all life on the planet's surface.

Martial law is imposed and a lottery selects 800,000 Americans to join 200,000 pre-selected individuals in underground shelters in Missouri's limestone bluffs. Lerner, who has become an MSNBC anchor during the crisis, is pre-selected, as are the Biedermans, as gratitude for Leo discovering the comet. Lerner's mother, Robin, upon learning most senior citizens are ineligible for the lottery, commits suicide. To save his girlfriend Sarah and her family, Leo marries her, but Sarah's parents are not allowed to accompany her and she refuses to go without them.

A last-ditch effort to deflect the comets with ICBMs fails. Upon arrival at the shelter, Leo decides to return to Virginia to find Sarah. On a motorcycle, he reaches Sarah's family on the freeway, which is heavily filled with traffic. Her parents force her to leave with Leo and her baby brother, while they remain behind. The MSNBC crew draws straws to decide who will board an evacuation helicopter with Lerner. At the last minute, Lerner gives up her seat to her colleague, Beth, and her young daughter. She instead travels to her childhood beach home and reconciles with her estranged father.

Biederman hits the Atlantic Ocean near Cape Hatteras, North Carolina and creates a megatsunami that destroys several countries and much of the East Coast of the United States, reaching the Ohio and Tennessee Valleys plus Europe and Africa. Millions including Lerner, her father, and Sarah's parents perish while countless more are left homeless. Leo, Sarah, Sarah's brother and other survivors make it to safety in the foothills of the Appalachian Mountains. The Messiah crew, now dangerously low on life-support and propellant fuel, decide to sacrifice themselves by flying deep inside Wolf, and detonating their remaining nuclear bombs. They all say goodbye to their loved ones before executing their plan. Millions of pieces of ice and rock burn harmlessly in the atmosphere and light up the sky for an hour, averting further catastrophe.

Beck addresses thousands at an under-construction replacement United States Capitol, and announces the start of rebuilding their home that the Messiah has saved.

== Cast ==
- Robert Duvall as Captain Spurgeon "Fish" Tanner
- Téa Leoni as Jenny Lerner
- Elijah Wood as Leo Biederman
- Vanessa Redgrave as Robin Lerner
- Maximilian Schell as Jason Lerner
- Morgan Freeman as President Tom Beck
- James Cromwell as Alan Rittenhouse
- Ron Eldard as Commander Oren Monash
- Jon Favreau as Dr. Gus Partenza
- Laura Innes as Beth Stanley
- Mary McCormack as Andrea "Andy" Baker
- Richard Schiff as Don Biederman
- Leelee Sobieski as Sarah Hotchner
- Aleksandr Baluev as Colonel Mikhail "Mick" Tulchinsky
- Blair Underwood as Mark Simon
- Dougray Scott as Eric Vennekor
- Gary Werntz as Chuck Hotchner
- Denise Crosby as Vicky Hotchner
- Kimberly Huie as Wendy Mogel
- Kurtwood Smith as Otis "Mitch" Hefter
- Charles Martin Smith as Marcus Wolf
- O'Neal Compton as Morten Entriken
- Francis X. McCarthy as General Scott
- Derek de Lint as Theo Van Sertema
- Rya Kihlstedt as Chloe Lerner
- Mark Moses as Tim Urbanski
- Bruce Weitz as Stuart Caley
- Suzy Nakamura as Lerner's assistant
- Betsy Brantley as Ellen Biederman
- Jason Dohring as Jason Thurman
- Mike O'Malley as Mike Perry

== Production ==
The origins of Deep Impact started in the late 1970s when producers Richard D. Zanuck and David Brown approached Paramount Pictures proposing a remake of the 1951 film When Worlds Collide. Although several screenplay drafts were completed, the producers were not completely happy with any of them and the project remained in "development hell" for many years. In the mid-1990s, they approached director Steven Spielberg, with whom they had made the 1975 blockbuster Jaws, to discuss their long-planned project. However, Spielberg had already bought the film rights to the 1993 novel The Hammer of God by Arthur C. Clarke, which dealt with a similar theme of an asteroid on a collision course for Earth and humanity's attempts to prevent its own extinction. Spielberg planned to produce and direct The Hammer of God himself for his then-fledgling DreamWorks studio, but opted to merge the two projects with Zanuck and Brown, and they commissioned a screenplay for what would become Deep Impact.

In 1995, the forthcoming film was announced in industry publications as "Screenplay by Bruce Joel Rubin, based on the film When Worlds Collide and The Hammer of God by Arthur C Clarke" though ultimately, following a subsequent redraft by Michael Tolkin, neither source work would be credited in the final film. Spielberg still planned to direct Deep Impact himself, but commitments to his 1997 film Amistad prevented him from doing so in time, particularly as Touchstone Pictures had just announced their own similarly themed film Armageddon, also to be released in summer 1998. Not wanting to wait, the producers opted to hire Mimi Leder to direct Deep Impact, with Spielberg acting as executive producer. Leder was unaware of the other film being made. “I couldn’t believe it. And the press was trying to pit us against each other. That didn’t feel good. Both films have great value and, fortunately, they both succeeded tremendously." Clarke's novel was used as part of the film's publicity campaign both before and after the film's release and he was disgruntled about not being credited on the film.

Jenny Lerner, the character played by Téa Leoni, was originally intended to work for CNN. CNN rejected this because it would be "inappropriate". MSNBC agreed to be featured in the movie instead, seeing it as a way to gain exposure for the then newly created network.

Director Mimi Leder later explained that she would have liked to travel to other countries to incorporate additional perspectives, but due to a strict filming schedule and a comparatively low budget, the idea was scratched. Visual effects supervisor Scott Farrar felt that coverage of worldwide events would have distracted and detracted from the main characters' stories.

A number of scientists worked as science consultants for the film including astronomers Gene Shoemaker, Carolyn Shoemaker, Josh Colwell and Chris Luchini, former astronaut David Walker, and the former director of the NASA's Lyndon B. Johnson Space Center Gerry Griffin.

== Soundtrack ==
Deep Impact – Music from the Motion Picture

Soundtrack album by James Horner
- Released: May 5, 1998
- Recorded: 1997–1998
- Genre: Film score
- Length: 77:12
- Label: Sony Classical

James Horner chronology
Titanic (1997)	Deep Impact – Music from the Motion Picture (1998)	The Mask of Zorro (1998)

The music for the film was composed and conducted by James Horner and performed by the Hollywood Studio Symphony. On July 30, 2026, La-La Land Records expanded and remastered the album with previously unreleased cues.

== Release ==
=== Theatrical ===
Deep Impact was released by Paramount Pictures in the United States and DreamWorks Pictures internationally on May 8, 1998.

=== Home media ===
Deep Impact was released on VHS on October 20, 1998, LaserDisc on November 3 and DVD on December 15. On October 19, 2004, a special edition DVD was released. The film debuted on Blu-ray on September 15, 2009. On May 2, 2023, in honor of its 25th anniversary, a two-disc 4K Blu-ray set was released.

== Reception ==
=== Box office ===
Deep Impact debuted at the North American box office with $41.1 million in ticket sales. It managed to beat out Twister to have the highest non-holiday May opening weekend. The film also scored the tenth-highest opening weekend of all time. For a decade, the film held the record for having the biggest opening weekend for a female-directed film until it was taken by Twilight in 2008. The film grossed $140 million in North America and an additional $209 million worldwide for a total gross of $349 million. Despite competition in the summer of 1998 from the similar Armageddon, both films were widely successful, with Deep Impact being the higher opener of the two, while Armageddon was the most profitable overall.

=== Critical reception ===
Deep Impact had a mixed critical reception. Based on 98 reviews collected by Rotten Tomatoes, 45% of critics enjoyed the film, with an average rating of 5.8/10. The website's critical consensus reads, "A tidal wave of melodrama sinks Deep Impact's chance at being the memorable disaster flick it aspires to be." Metacritic gave a score of 40 out of 100 based on 20 reviews, indicating "mixed or average" reviews. Audiences polled by CinemaScore gave the film an average grade of "B" on an A+ to F scale.

Elvis Mitchell of The New York Times said that the film "has a more brooding, thoughtful tone than this genre usually calls for", while Rita Kempley and Michael O'Sullivan of The Washington Post criticized what they saw as unemotional performances and a lack of tension.

=== Accolades ===
At the 1998 Stinkers Bad Movie Awards, the film was nominated for Worst Supporting Actress for Leoni (lost to Lacey Chabert for Lost in Space) and Worst Screenplay For A Film Grossing More Than $100 Million (Using Hollywood Math) (lost to Godzilla). The film was also nominated for Best Science Fiction Film at the Saturn Awards, but lost to both Dark City and another asteroid film, Armageddon.

== See also ==
- Greenland, a similar film
- Don't Look Up, a similar film which uses a comet as a satirical allegory for climate change
- Impact event
- Impact events in fiction
- Impact crater
- Asteroid deflection strategies
- List of disaster films
- Hollywood Science
