= List of 1994 box office number-one films in Italy =

This is a list of films which have placed number one at the box office in Italy during 1994. Amounts are in lire.

== Number one films ==
†	This implies the highest-grossing movie of the year.

#	Weekend ending	Film	Box office	Notes	Ref
1	2 January 1994	Aladdin	₤3,060,124,700	Aladdin returned to number one in its fifth week of release	
2	9 January 1994	Aladdin	₤1,682,027,340		
3	16 January 1994	A Perfect World	₤1,016,610,830	A Perfect World reached number one in its fifth week of release	
4	23 January 1994	Demolition Man	₤1,768,867,340		
5	30 January 1994	Mr. Jones	₤1,344,401,770	Mr. Jones reached number one in its third week of release	
6	6 February 1994	Mrs. Doubtfire	₤2,798,903,300		
7	13 February 1994	Mrs. Doubtfire	₤3,104,120,850		
8	20 February 1994	Mrs. Doubtfire	₤3,209,910,340		
9	27 February 1994	Mrs. Doubtfire	₤2,244,994,360		
10	6 March 1994	Mrs. Doubtfire	₤1,280,442,440		
11	13 March 1994	Philadelphia	₤1,557,827,770	Philadelphia reached number one in its second week of release	
12	20 March 1994	Philadelphia	₤1,468,879,164		
13	27 March 1994	Schindler's List	₤1,848,457,870	Schindler's List reached number one in its third week of release	
14	3 April 1994	Schindler's List	₤1,775,156,560		
15	10 April 1994	Schindler's List	₤1,819,999,400		
16	17 April 1994	Schindler's List	₤1,478,931,456		
17	24 April 1994	My Life	₤1,052,028,740	My Life reached number one in its second week of release	
18	1 May 1994	My Life	₤936,261,759		
19	9 May 1994^{4-day weekend}	Naked Gun 33 1/3: The Final Insult	₤821,767,644		
20	15 May 1994	Naked Gun 33 1/3: The Final Insult	₤775,420,896		
21	22 May 1994	Naked Gun 33 1/3: The Final Insult	₤528,894,420		
22	29 May 1994	Three Colours: Red	₤394,919,430	Three Colours: Red reached number one in its second week of release	
23	5 June 1994	Three Colours: Red	₤339,227,196		
24	12 June 1994	Three Colours: Red	₤456,151,527		
25	19 June 1994	Three Colours: Red	₤146,913,481		
26	26 June 1994	Three Colours: Red	TBD		
27	3 July 1994	Three Colours: Red	₤53,572,848		
28	10 July 1994	Three Colours: Red	TBD		
29	17 July 1994	Three Colours: Red	TBD		
30	24 July 1994	Three Colours: Red	TBD		
31	31 July 1994	Three Colours: Red	TBD		
32	7 August 1994	Three Colours: Red	TBD		
33	14 August 1994	Three Colours: Red	TBD		
34	21 August 1994	Three Colours: Red	TBD		
35	28 August 1994	Ace Ventura: Pet Detective	₤711,873,844		
36	4 September 1994	Ace Ventura: Pet Detective	₤1,748,832,420		
37	11 September 1994	Ace Ventura: Pet Detective	₤1,277,529,657		
38	18 September 1994	Wolf	₤1,940,547,728	Wolf reached number one in its second week of release	
39	25 September 1994	True Lies	₤1,541,371,980	True Lies reached number one in its second week of release	
40	2 October 1994	The Crow	₤1,977,391,938	The Crow reached number one in its second week of release	
41	9 October 1994	The Flintstones	TBD	The Flintstones grossed $4.8 million in six days	
42	16 October 1994	The Flintstones	₤3,607,415,912		
43	23 October 1994	The Flintstones	₤2,561,444,464		
44	30 October 1994	The Monster †	₤5,829,017,168	The Monster grossed a record $13.4 million in its opening week	
45	6 November 1994	The Monster †	₤5,997,404,907		
46	13 November 1994	The Monster †	TBD		
47	20 November 1994	The Monster †	TBD		
48	27 November 1994	The Lion King	₤2,487,332,800		
49	4 December 1994	The Lion King	TBD		
50	11 December 1994	The Lion King	₤3,254,806,400		
51	18 December 1994	The Lion King	TBD		
52	26 December 1994^{4-day weekend}	The Lion King	₤5,031,355,200		

== Highest-grossing films ==
Rank	Title	Distributor	Gross (₤)
1.	The Monster	Filmauro	33,927,214,400
2.	Aladdin	Buena Vista International	30,508,934,400
3.	The Lion King	Buena Vista International	26,534,001,600
4.	Mrs. Doubtfire	20th Century Fox	19,622,860,800
5.	Schindler's List	UIP	17,893,932,800
6.	Son of the Pink Panther	Filmauro	17,205,588,800
7.	Forrest Gump	UIP	16,141,953,600
8.	The Flintstones	UIP	15,885,780,800
9.	Philadelphia	Columbia TriStar	14,286,240,000
10.	The Crow	Mediaset	12,954,851,200

== See also ==
- Lists of box office number-one films

Preceded by 1993	1994	Succeeded by 1995
