= Blue Mosque =

Blue Mosque may refer to:

== Buildings ==
- Blue Mosque, Istanbul, Turkey
- Blue Mosque, Tabriz, Iran
- Blue Mosque, Yerevan, Armenia
- Blue Mosque, Amsterdam, Netherlands
- Blue Mosque, Singapore
- Blue Mosque, Kabul, Afghanistan, also known as the Sakhi Shah-e Mardan Shrine

=== Mosques also known as the Blue Mosque ===
- Great Mosque of Herat, Afghanistan
- Hazrat Ali Mazar, Mazari Sharif, Afghanistan
- Ajdarbey Mosque, Baku, Azerbaijan
- Aqsunqur Mosque, Egypt
- King Abdullah I Mosque, Amman, Jordan
- Mohammad Al-Amin Mosque, Beirut, Lebanon
- Sultan Salahuddin Abdul Aziz Mosque, Shah Alam, Malaysia

== Other uses ==
- Blue Mosque a 1994 album by Muslimgauze; see Bryn Jones discography
