= My Life (film) =

1993 American film by Bruce Joel Rubin

- Theatrical release poster
- Directed by: Bruce Joel Rubin
- Written by: Bruce Joel Rubin
- Produced by: Hunt Lowry; Bruce Joel Rubin; Jerry Zucker
- Starring: Michael Keaton; Nicole Kidman
- Cinematography: Peter James
- Edited by: Richard Chew
- Music by: John Barry
- Production company: Zucker Brothers Productions
- Distributed by: Columbia Pictures (United States); Capella Films (International)
- Release date: November 12, 1993
- Running time: 117 minutes
- Country: United States
- Language: English
- Budget: $15-20 million
- Box office: $54 million

My Life is a 1993 American drama film written, directed, and co-produced by Bruce Joel Rubin, starring Michael Keaton and Nicole Kidman. With a PG-13 rating, this film's worldwide box office gross was $54 million.

== Plot ==
Bob Ivanovich, a young Ukrainian-American, prays one night for a circus to be erected in his backyard the following day. After school the next day, he runs home eagerly, followed by his friends. To his disappointment, no circus awaits. Angrily, Bob retreats to the closet in his room, his personal retreat space.

Bob has shunned his Ukrainian-born parents due to their customs and traditions, leading him to move far from his family in Detroit and change his last name to Jones. 30 years later, he now runs a Los Angeles public relations firm. Bob is happily married to Gail, who is pregnant with their first child. He is horrified to be diagnosed with terminal kidney cancer as he may not live to see their baby born.

Bob begins to make home movies, so his son can know who his father was, showing him how to cook spaghetti, how to drive, etc. He also begins to visit the Chinese healer Mr. Ho who urges him to listen to his heart. It is calling Bob to forgive and life is always giving him invitations if he would only listen. At his wife's urging, they fly to his hometown Detroit to attend his brother Paul's traditional Ukrainian wedding.

While in the area, Bob visits his childhood home. They also attempt to mend fences with his estranged family, which does not go well. Bob criticizes his brother for not moving to California like he did, and his father resents Bob moving thousands of miles away and changing his name.

Bob returns to California with a heavy heart, sadly telling his wife, "This is my last trip home." At his next visit to the healer, Mr. Ho advises him to go into his heart "soon." Bob teaches his son by camera how to shave, play basketball, and start a car by jumper cable.

Also confronting a childhood fear, Bob finally rides a formidable roller coaster (filmed on Colossus at Six Flags Magic Mountain). During the ride, a young companion urges him to let go of the railing as the descent begins, but Bob firmly holds on. (A metaphor for his fear of letting go of life.) He is living on borrowed time—beyond the date the doctors gave him, as he says to his wife after getting off the coaster, "Today is D-Day. Death Day. I was supposed to be dead by today."

Gail's contractions increase, and soon she is in the hospital to give birth to their baby. Bob and Gail have a happy time with their newborn Brian, but soon Bob's condition worsens, as now the cancer has reached his brain. Hospice care is arranged for him. Bob makes a final visit to Mr. Ho and asks him what the light is he keeps seeing. He replies it is "the life of the self" and urges him to get his "house in order (life and personal affairs)."

A hospice nurse, Theresa, moves in to help, as Bob's health continues to deteriorate. Bob and Gail finally call his family to inform them of what is happening. They come west for the first time to visit, and he finally makes peace with them. His childhood wish is finally granted by a circus in the backyard.

As his father shaves him, Bob shows that he has finally made peace by telling his father he loves him. Bob finally comes to terms with his life as he dies peacefully, surrounded by the loving support of his family.

Bob is next seen on a metaphysical roller coaster, letting go of the railing, raising his arms freely in the air this time, metaphorically letting go of life, and finally enjoying the ride of life. He rides toward a beautiful, shining, ethereal light. A year later, Brian and Gail watch Bob on video, as he reads Dr. Seuss's Green Eggs and Ham to him.

== Cast ==
- Michael Keaton as Robert "Bob" Ivanovich/Jones
- Nicole Kidman as Gail Jones
- Bradley Whitford as Paul Ivanovich
- Queen Latifah as Theresa
- Haing S. Ngor as Mr. Ho
- Michael Constantine as Bill Ivanovich
- Rebecca Schull as Rose Ivanovich
- Mark Holton as Sam
- Lisa Stahl as Deborah
- Lee Garlington as Carol Sandman
- Romy Rosemont as Anya Stasiuk
- Richard Schiff as Young Bill Ivanovich
- Brenda Strong as Laura
- Bruce Jarchow as Walter
- Kenneth Tigar as Dr. Califano
- Sylvia Kauders as Aunt Tekla
- Magda Harout as Aunt Sonia
- Mark Lowenthal as Dr. Mills
- Toni Sawyer as Doris
- Danny Rimmer as Young Bobbie
- Ruth de Sosa as Young Rose Ivanovich
- Rudi Davis as George
- Jane Morris as Dorothy
- Charlotte Zucker as Guest at Wedding

== Reception ==
=== Box office ===
My Life opened at number three at the US box office behind The Three Musketeers and Carlito's Way. It was number one in Italy for two weeks. It grossed $27 million in the United States and Canada and the same internationally for a worldwide gross of $54 million.

=== Critical response ===
The film received mixed reviews from critics. On Rotten Tomatoes it has an approval rating of 44% based on reviews from 25 critics. Audiences surveyed by CinemaScore gave the film a grade A on a scale of A to F.

Roger Ebert of the Chicago Sun-Times gave the film 2.5/4 and wrote: "My Life should be a more rigorous and single-minded film; maybe it started that way, before getting spoonfuls of honey to make the medicine go down."
