= Spice World (film) =

1997 film by Bob Spiers

- Theatrical release poster
- Directed by: Bob Spiers
- Written by: Kim Fuller
- Based on: An idea by: The Spice Girls; Kim Fuller
- Produced by: Uri Fruchtmann; Barnaby Thompson
- Starring: Victoria; Emma; Mel C; Geri; Mel B; Richard E. Grant; Alan Cumming; George Wendt; Claire Rushbrook; Mark McKinney; Roger Moore
- Cinematography: Clive Tickner
- Edited by: Andrea MacArthur
- Music by: Paul Hardcastle
- Production companies: Columbia Pictures; Spice Girls Ltd.; Fragile Films; PolyGram Filmed Entertainment; Icon Entertainment International
- Distributed by: Columbia Pictures; Sony Pictures Releasing; PolyGram Filmed Entertainment
- Release dates: 15 December 1997 (premiere); 26 December 1997
- Running time: 93 minutes
- Country: United Kingdom
- Language: English
- Budget: $25 million
- Box office: $56 million

Spice World is a 1997 British musical comedy film directed by Bob Spiers and written by Kim Fuller. The film stars pop girl group the Spice Girls, who all play themselves. The film — made in a similar vein to the Beatles' 1964 film A Hard Day's Night — depicts a series of fictional events leading up to a major concert at London's Royal Albert Hall, liberally interspersed with dream sequences and flashbacks as well as surreal moments and humorous asides, whilst also including a subplot dealing with a smear campaign against the Spice Girls by an overzealous newspaper CEO in an attempt to destroy their reputation for his own benefit.

This is the second feature-length film directed by Spiers, following That Darn Cat (1997). The film features Richard E. Grant, Alan Cumming, George Wendt, Claire Rushbrook, Mark McKinney and Roger Moore in supporting roles, with cameo appearances by a number of British celebrities. Filming took place in London for six of the eight filming weeks and also inside Twickenham Studios, as well as at over forty famous British landmarks. Shooting featured several fourteen-hour shooting sessions and a constant, heavy media presence due to the Spice Girls' popularity.

The film premiered in the United Kingdom on 15 December 1997, ahead of its wide theatrical release on the British holiday Boxing Day (26 December). In North America, it was released on 23 January 1998 by Columbia Pictures. In the United States, Spice World became a box office success and broke the record for the highest-ever weekend debut for Super Bowl weekend with box office sales of $10.5 million. The film grossed $56 million at the worldwide box office and received primarily negative reviews for its lack of cohesive plot, poor acting performances and uninspired humour.

To celebrate its 20th anniversary in 2017, Spice World was given a limited re-release across the United Kingdom showing at Odeon Cinemas. Spice World is the highest-grossing film of all time by a musical group. It has arguably achieved cult status.

== Plot ==
The Spice Girls perform on Top of the Pops (“Too Much”) and then are quickly ushered back to their tour bus by their manager Clifford. They blow right past Piers Cuthbertson-Smyth and his crew, who are trying to make a documentary about them, and navigate throngs of fans (“Do It”). The girls rehearse (“Say You’ll Be There”) and spend time with their pregnant friend Nicola, which leads to them speculating about what they will be like when they become mothers (“Mama”). Piers tries to convince Clifford and his assistant Deborah to let him film the girls for his documentary.

Meanwhile, newspaper owner Kevin McMaxford, sick of The Spice Girls dominating all the headlines, hatches a plan to ruin their reputation, and movie executives Martin and Graydon pitch ridiculous screenplay ideas to Clifford (“Denying”). After arguing about being stereotyped, the girls branch out during a photo shoot and impersonate each other (“Saturday Night Divas”).

The girls go to a publicity party (“Stop” and “2 Become 1”) where an investigator hired by McMaxford, Damien, takes a comment by Geri out of context to create a scandalous headline. After a performance in Milan (“I’m the Leader of the Gang”), they return to England to find that the toilets on the bus have failed. When they venture into the woods to relieve themselves, they meet a group of aliens who ask for their autographs. Clifford, thinking they were hallucinating because they are overworked, tries to get his boss, the mysterious Chief, to let the girls have time off. He refuses as their biggest gig yet, a performance at Albert Hall, is coming up.

The girls are sent to dance teacher Mr. Step to learn new choreography and participate in conditioning drills (“Never Give Up On the Good Times” and “Sound Off”). Damien sneaks into the estate they are staying in, and overhears the girls discussing nightmares about their big Albert Hall performance going wrong. Clifford is irate upon seeing McMaxford’s headline about this, but the girls are nonchalant.

The girls host two fan contest winners aboard their bus. Fed up with being cooped up, they flee the bus at a red light and hop onto a speedboat (“My Boy Lollipop”). Both young contest winners, Mel C, and Victoria all end up in the water, as does Piers, who was following closely. Damien was also nearby to alert McMaxford, who prints another headline.

Clifford confronts the girls about their behavior the night before the Albert Hall show. They all storm out separately and reminisce about the beginning of their career (“Wannabe”). Eventually they come together at the cafe they used to practice in (“Viva Forever”), and decide that they need to spend more time with Nicola before her baby is born. They bring her to a dance club (“Who Do You Think You Are”) where her water breaks.

As Nicola gives birth to a baby girl, Martin and Graydon pitch another movie idea to Clifford, which unfolds as they tell it: the girls, unable to find their bus driver, commandeer the bus themselves and speed through London to Albert Hall, with Victoria at the wheel, passing landmarks such as Buckingham Palace, the Tower Bridge, and Big Ben. They also discover a bomb beneath the bus.

The girls arrive right on time, and Emma uses her smile to get the police officers to let them go without getting arrested for reckless driving. The girls get ready in a hurry and perform for the waiting crowd (“Spice Up Your Life”). The show is broadcast live and the world dances along, including Chief, the green aliens, Nicola and her baby girl, Clifford, Deborah, Martin, and Graydon.

During the credits, various cast members discuss their roles with Martin and Graydon, as though they are about to create the movie they pitched to Clifford. The girls talk to the audience and the bomb on the bus explodes before the rest of the credits roll (“The Lady is a Vamp”).

== Cast ==
- The Spice Girls
  - Victoria Adams ("Posh Spice") as herself
  - Melanie Brown ("Scary Spice") as herself
  - Emma Bunton ("Baby Spice") as herself
  - Melanie Chisholm ("Sporty Spice") as herself
  - Geri Halliwell ("Ginger Spice") as herself
- Richard E. Grant as Clifford, the Girls' manager
- Claire Rushbrook as Deborah, the Girls' assistant
- Roger Moore as The Chief, the head of the Girls' record label
- Naoko Mori as Nicola, the Girls' best friend
- Meat Loaf as Dennis, the Girls' bus driver
- Barry Humphries as Kevin McMaxford
- Jason Flemyng as Brad
- Richard O'Brien as Damien
- Alan Cumming as Piers Cuthbertson-Smyth
- George Wendt as Martin Barnfield
- Mark McKinney as Graydon
- Steven O'Donnell as Jess
- Gary Crombie as Roy MacInerney
- Michael Barrymore as Mr. Step
- Jools Holland as musical director
- Kevin McNally as policeman / Dance of the Goblins disassociator
- Kevin Allen as Gainer
- Peter Sissons as newsreader
- Neil Mullarkey as Barnaby
- Richard Briers as archbishop of Candleford
- Dominic West as the photographer
- Bill Paterson as Brian
- Jonathan Ross as himself
- Elvis Costello as the bartender
- Elton John as himself
- Bob Geldof as himself
- Bob Hoskins as himself
- Jennifer Saunders as fashionable woman
- Hugh Laurie as Hercule Poirot
- Stephen Fry as judge
- Simon Ellis as keyboardist in Spice band

== Production ==
=== Development ===
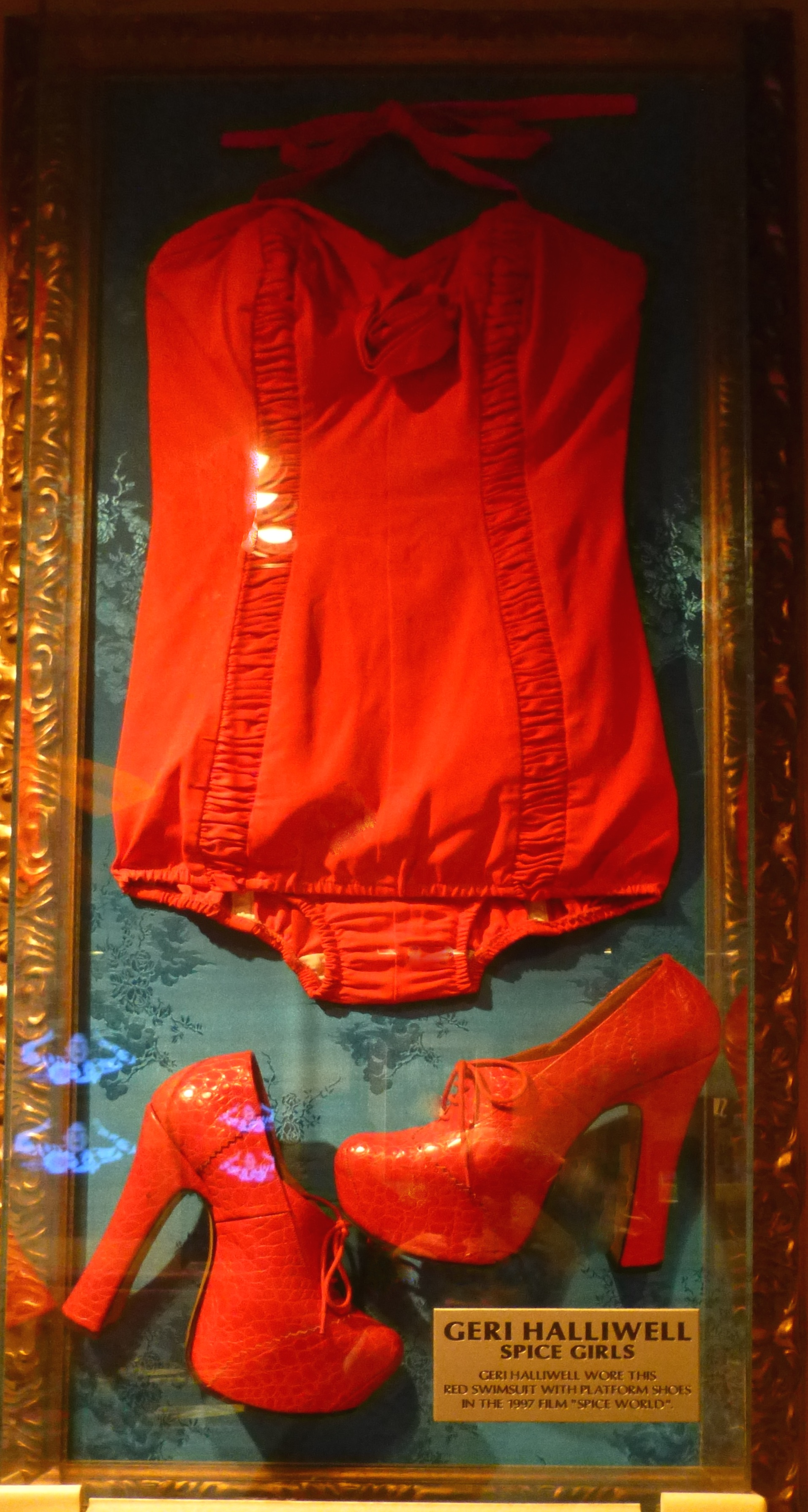
Geri Halliwell's red swimsuit from the film

As the popularity of the Spice Girls grew, The Walt Disney Company approached the band about making a film. The band turned down Disney's offer as they did not like the "Disney-fied" script, which was about "a young single mother of one of the girls, fighting hardship to form the band." Kim Fuller, brother of the band's manager Simon Fuller, decided to write the screenplay for a Spice Girls movie himself.

According to Fuller, the script had to be revised many times to accommodate the growing number of celebrities hoping to take part in the film. Director Bob Spiers had been working in America on the Disney film That Darn Cat at the peak of the Girls' popularity. He was unaware of the group when first offered the job until his friend Jennifer Saunders advised that he take it. He arrived at a meeting with them in a New York hotel, unaware of what they looked like.

=== Casting ===
Frank Bruno was originally cast as the tour bus driver, but withdrew after a security guard prevented his son Franklin having an on-set photo taken with the girls. Mentions of Princess Diana and scenes featuring the designer Gianni Versace had to be edited out in post-production following their deaths shortly before the release of the film.

"Their company rang me up and asked if I would be in it", remarked Elvis Costello of his cameo appearance. "I wouldn't have thought I was the kind of face you would get to do a cornflakes advert. Maybe twenty years ago. I was surprised."

==== Gary Glitter references ====
Glam rock singer Gary Glitter filmed a four-minute cameo as himself, but shortly before release, he was arrested on child pornography offences. The Spice Girls and the production team agreed that his cameo should be deleted from the final print, although the band's performance of Glitter's "I'm the Leader of the Gang (I Am)" was retained. Glitter's scene has since been leaked online.

=== Filming ===
Spice World began filming in June and wrapped in August 1997. The film was to be set to the songs from the Girls' second studio album, but no songs had been written when filming began. The band thus had to do all the songwriting and recording at the same time as they were filming Spice World.

=== Music ===
An official motion picture soundtrack was not released. Their second studio album, Spiceworld (1997), was heavily promoted and served as the film's soundtrack. The only song from Spiceworld not to appear in the film is "Move Over". The songs appearing in the film are in order of appearance.

"Too Much" was released in part to promote the film, and debuted atop the UK Singles Chart, becoming the Spice Girls' second consecutive Christmas number-one single. It made the group the first act to reach number one with their first six singles, and the first to debut atop the chart five times in a row. The single spent two weeks at number one, and was certified platinum by the British Phonographic Industry (BPI) on 9 January 1998.

- Spice Girls - "Too Much" (Opening sequence)
- Spice Girls - "Do It"
- Spice Girls - "Say You'll Be There (Concert Version)"
- Spice Girls - "Mama"
- Spice Girls - "Denying"
- Spice Girls - "Saturday Night Divas"
- Spice Girls - "Stop"
- Spice Girls - "2 Become 1"
- Spice Girls - "I'm the Leader of the Gang (I Am)"
- Spice Girls - "Never Give Up on the Good Times"
- Spice Girls - "Sound Off"
- Millie Small - "My Boy Lollipop"
- Spice Girls - "Viva Forever"
- Spice Girls - "Wannabe (Demo Version)"
- Spice Girls - "Who Do You Think You Are (Morales Club Mix)"
- Spice Girls - "Spice Up Your Life"
- Spice Girls - "The Lady Is a Vamp" (Closing titles)

== Release ==
=== Rating ===
In the United Kingdom, Spice World was granted a PG certificate by the British Board of Film Classification for "mild bad language, mild sex references". In the United States, it received a PG rating from the Motion Picture Association for "some vulgarity, brief nudity and language".

=== Merchandising ===
Official toy versions of the Spice Bus were produced upon the release of the film.

=== Home media ===
The film was released on VHS in May 1998 in many regions including the UK, Germany, Spain, the Netherlands, Japan and Australia. In June 1998, it came out on VHS in the US and Canada. Despite concerns that the high-profile departure of Halliwell from the Spice Girls would affect sales, global demand for the VHS was high. In the UK, the film was number one on the video charts for six consecutive weeks, was certified 11× Platinum, and became the ninth best-selling video of 1998. In the US, the film peaked at number one on the video charts for five consecutive weeks and was the fifth best-selling video of 1998.

Spice World: The 10th Anniversary Edition was released on DVD on 19 November 2007 in the United Kingdom and Australia and on 27 November 2007 in the United States.

Spice World: The 20th Anniversary Edition was released on DVD on 7 February 2018 in Australia.

=== 2017 re-release ===
In 2017, the film was screened at various cinemas in the UK, Ireland and Australia to mark its 20th anniversary.

== Reception ==
=== Box office ===
Spice World was a number-one box office success in the United Kingdom, grossing £2.3 million during its opening weekend on Boxing Day 1997. It was the highest opening gross for a British production in the UK, surpassing the record set earlier in the year by Bean (excluding previews for Bean) and also set a record opening week gross for a British film in the U.K. with a gross of £4.8 million. The film was also successful in the United States, breaking the record at that time for the highest-ever weekend debut for Super Bowl weekend (25 January 1998), with box office sales of $10,527,222. The film took in $56 million at the box office worldwide, though media articles have referred to a higher figure of $100 million after DVD sales were included.

=== Critical reception ===
The film received generally negative reviews from critics. Film review aggregation website Rotten Tomatoes gave Spice World a rating of 35% based on reviews from 69 critics, with an average rating of 4.7 out of 10 and a critic consensus that reads "Spice World's lack of cohesive plot will likely lose most viewers, but for fans of the titular girl group there's more than enough fun to be had in their wacky -- albeit superficial -- whirlwind of an adventure." On Metacritic, the film has a 32 out of 100 rating, based on 16 critics, indicating "generally unfavorable reviews".

Noted American film critic Roger Ebert gave one-half of a star and listed Spice World as one of his most hated films, saying: "The Spice Girls are easier to tell apart than the Mutant Ninja Turtles, but that is small consolation: What can you say about five women whose principal distinguishing characteristic is that they have different names? They occupy Spice World as if they were watching it: They're so detached they can't even successfully lip-synch their own songs." And when he reviewed the film on his and Gene Siskel's film critique programme Siskel & Ebert, only three weeks into 1998, he declared that he had already seen the worst film of that year, and called it "an entertainment-free dead zone". Ebert included the film on the Worst of 1998 special, but he chose Armageddon as the worst film of 1998.

Janet Maslin of The New York Times stated that the film "is pleasant and painless enough to amuse ardent fans, who figure in the film quite often." She also noted that while it got a PG rating in the United States, "nothing about it should disturb its target audience of media-wise, fun-loving 8-year-old girls." Writing for Sight and Sound, in a positive review, Mark Sinker placed it alongside the Monkees' 1968 cult film Head. He went on to say that it "sends up the amiable idiocy of pop packaging - and the slow witted mass-media response to it" and it was "tirelessly generous in its energy".

Derek Elley, resident film critic for Variety, gave a mixed review, calling the film "bright and breezy" and "as timely but evanescent as the Cool Britannia culture it celebrates". He stated that the film would "delight the Fab Five's pre-pubescent fans" but that it would "be forgotten within six months".

=== Reappraisal ===
Several critics have reevaluated the film more positively in the years after its initial release. Re-watching Spice World in 2019, Alice Vincent of The Daily Telegraph was "pleasantly surprised" that the jokes had not aged badly and found the sets and costuming had a "now-retro charm". Vincent stated: "It's an irreverent, lighthearted romp that captured the brash, patriotic positivity of a London swept up in Cool Britannia." Writing for The New York Times in 2019, Eleanor Stanford found the film to be "much smarter and more self-aware than I once gave it credit for," particularly enjoying how the Spice Girls poked fun at themselves. Stanford concluded: "The Spice Girls were absolutely working the (very sexist) system, and making a lot of money off it, but they were doing it slyly, with a wink and a grin. They were, I think, misunderstood at the time, and I wonder if an irreverent, breezy group like theirs could even exist today."

=== Accolades ===
The film has been listed in Golden Raspberry Awards founder John Wilson's book The Official Razzie Movie Guide as one of "The 100 Most Enjoyably Bad Movies Ever Made". Along with the nominations and wins racked up at the 1998 Stinkers Bad Movie Awards, Spice World was listed in their upcoming "100 Years, 100 Stinkers" list, in which people voted for the 100 worst movies of the 20th century. The film was ranked at #5.

Date of Ceremony	Award	Category	Recipients	Result	Ref.
1999	Stinkers Bad Movie Awards	Worst Picture	Spice World (Columbia)	Won	
1999	Stinkers Bad Movie Awards	Worst Director	Bob Spiers	Nominated	
1999	Stinkers Bad Movie Awards	Worst Actress	Spice Girls	Won	
1999	Stinkers Bad Movie Awards	Worst Song in a Motion Picture	"Spice Up Your Life" by the Spice Girls	Nominated	
1999	Stinkers Bad Movie Awards	Worst On-Screen Hairstyle	Scary Spice	Nominated	
March 20, 1999	Golden Raspberry Awards	Worst Picture	Spice World (Columbia)	Nominated	
March 20, 1999	Golden Raspberry Awards	Worst Actress	Spice Girls	Won	
March 20, 1999	Golden Raspberry Awards	Worst Supporting Actor	Roger Moore	Nominated	
March 20, 1999	Golden Raspberry Awards	Worst Screen Couple	Any combination of two characters, body parts or fashion accessories	Nominated	
March 20, 1999	Golden Raspberry Awards	Worst Screenplay	Kim Fuller and the Spice Girls	Nominated	
March 20, 1999	Golden Raspberry Awards	Worst New Star	Spice Girls	Nominated	
March 20, 1999	Golden Raspberry Awards	Worst Original Song	"Too Much", written by the Spice Girls, Andy Watkins, and Paul Wilson	Nominated	
February 26, 2005	Golden Raspberry Awards	Worst "Musical" of Our First 25 Years	Spice World (Columbia)	Nominated	
May 1, 1999	Kids' Choice Awards	Favorite Movie Actress	Spice Girls	Nominated	
June 16, 1999	Blockbuster Entertainment Awards	Favorite Movie Actress (Comedy)	Spice Girls	Nominated	

== Legacy ==
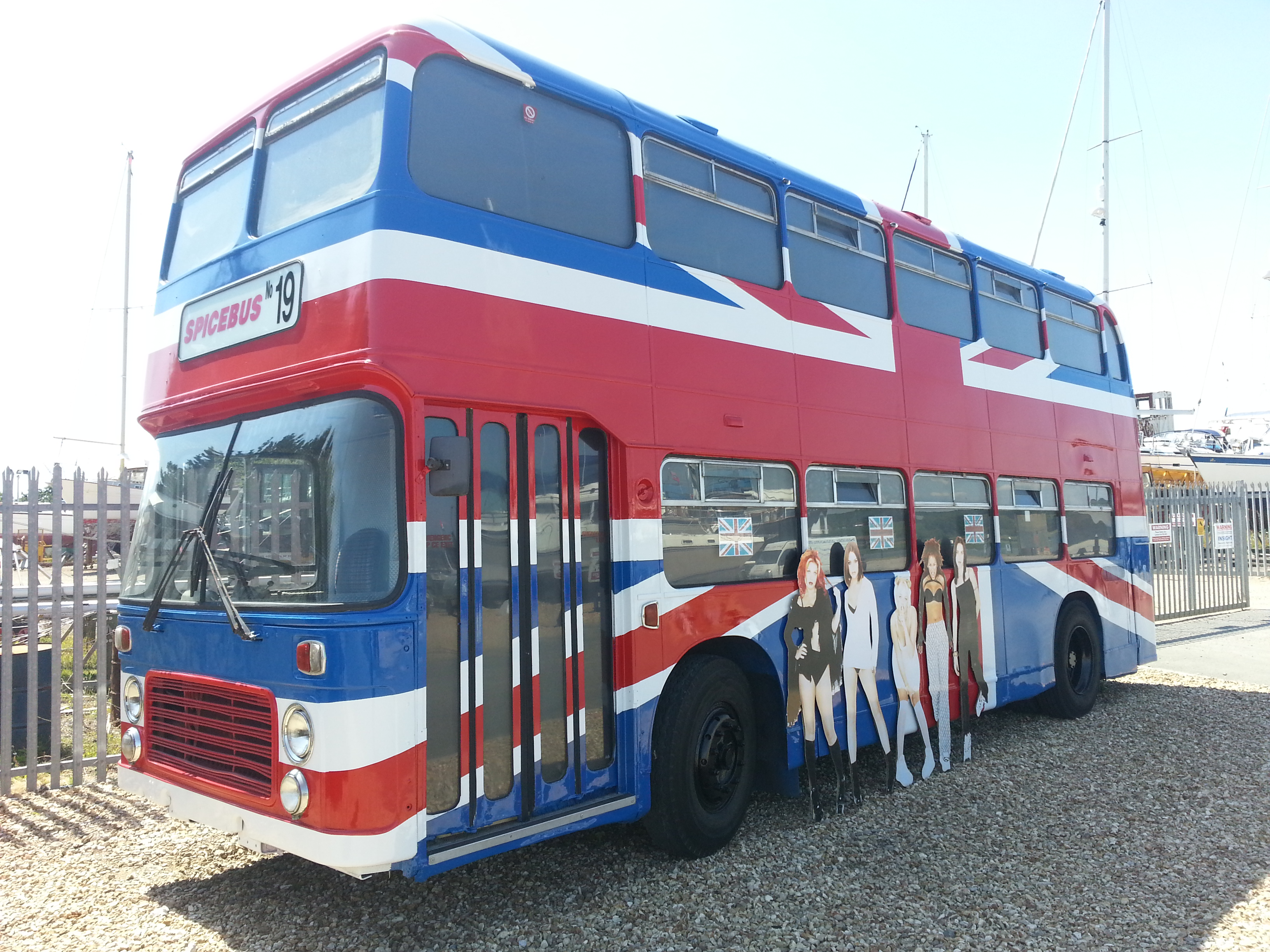
The bus used in the Spice World movie

Although Spice World negatively reviewed during its original release, retrospective reviews have rated the movie more positively. It has arguably achieved cult status.

Several commentators consider the film to be a cult classic, with Sara David of Vice naming the movie a "deranged, postmodern masterpiece". Some reviewers have appreciated the mockery of celebrity culture and cinematic clichés in the film, while adding excerpts of popular culture at the time.

On 18 July 2014, the Spice Bus used in the film was put on permanent display at Island Harbour Marina, on the Isle of Wight of England.

== Potential sequel ==
In 2010, Bunton revealed that there were plans for a sequel following the first film's release, stating: "We would've liked to do another film, but after Spice World, there was an album, then a tour and then Geri left, so it didn't happen."

Speaking in January 2019, following the announcement of the Spice Girls reunion tour, Simon Fuller confirmed plans to produce an animated sequel to Spice World. On 13 June 2019, it was reported that Paramount Animation president Mireille Soria had greenlit the project, with all five members of the band returning. The project was to feature both previous and original songs, with Karen McCullah and Kirsten Smith writing the screenplay. The film would have featured the band as superheroes. It remains in development hell.

== See also ==
- Spice Girls filmography
- List of films featuring extraterrestrials
