= Europe Trust Netherlands =

Dutch foundation

The Europe Trust Netherlands (ETN) is a Dutch foundation linked to The Europe Trust in Markfield, United Kingdom which owns Islamic related real estate. Since it was founded in 2006 the trust has taken ownership of multi million euros worth of real estate in Amsterdam, The Hague and Rotterdam.

== Religious property owned by the ETN ==
The recently build Blue Mosque in Amsterdam is currently the flagship of the ETN but its portfolio is fast growing and now includes real estate in The Hague, Rotterdam and Amsterdam.

=== Amsterdam: Blue Mosque Amsterdam Slotervaart ===
Almost immediately after the Europe Trust Nederland was founded the trust was able to secure the contract with the local government of Amsterdam-Slotervaart to build a new mosque for the local Muslims. The Europe Trust Nederland was able to put a Euro 400.000 down payment on the table when official contract was signed in 2008 the presence of Europe Trust co-founder Ahmed Kadhem al-Rawi.

There were problems with the financing of the Euro 2.3 million project. Only after Yahia Bouyafa left in mid-2010 the new board of trustees was able to secure funding from Kuwait to finalize the payments on the Blue Mosque. The largest donation came from Kuwaiti businessman Abdulmuhsen al-Kharafi who paid for the bulk of the Blue Mosque. Ahmad al-Falah one of the leaders of the Social Reform Society as the Kuwaiti Muslim Brotherhood is known was the main conduit to secure the funding. In recognition of the Kuwait sponsorship the Blue Mosque was named the Dutch Kuwaiti Cultural and Social Centre.

The funding for the mosque came through the Kuwait Ministry of Awqaf and Islamic Affairs. The designated oversight was done by Dr Mutlaq al-Qarawi at that time assistant undersecretary of the ministry of Awqaf for External Relations. Also main funder Abdulmuhsen al-Kharafi was elevated within the same Kuwaiti Ministry and is currently the Secretary General of the Ministry of Awqaf and Religious Affairs. After the Blue Mosque opened Mutlaq al-Qarawi became the chairman of Europe Trust Netherlands which owns the mosque.

=== The Hague: Mohammed Abdel Mohsen al-Kharafi Islamic Center ===
In February 2008 the ETN bought its first piece of real estate in The Hague. The large piece of real estate in The Hague was bought for Euro 1.1 million. The funding for the building came from Kuwait and was donated by Abdulmuhsen al-Kharafi. The building was named Mohammed Abdel Mohsen al-Kharafi Islamic Center and serves as a headquarters for the Foundation Social Cultural Center in the Netherlands (Stichting Sociaal Cultureel Centrum in Nederland) which the social and cultural arm of the Tunisian Islamist movement En-Nahda in the Netherlands.

=== Rotterdam: former school becomes Islamic Center ===
In 2012 the ETN expanded its portfolio with another large building, this time in Rotterdam. In the northern part of the city a former school was bought for Euro 1.3 million from the city of Rotterdam. The building is to serve as an Islamic center and is run by the Foundation Social Cultural Center in the Netherland and serves as the Rotterdam headquarters of the organisation and as a headquarters of the charity Rahma Relief Netherlands, another organisation linked to En-Nahda and run by Kamis Gacha a former trustee of the ETN and chairman of the Islamic Charity Rahma Relief in the Netherlands. Gacha signed the contract for the purchase of the real estate in Rotterdam. The building has five floors and a total area of 950 square meters. Euro 650,000 was granted by the Islamic Development Bank in Jeddah, Saudi Arabia and the remaining Euro 650,000 came mainly from Kuwaiti donors.

=== Rotterdam: Islamic Centre ‘De Middenweg’ ===
The second building in Rotterdam that was acquired recently by the Europe Trust Netherlands is a renovated former church that serves as an Islamic Centre focused on Dutch converts. The centre is called ‘De Middenweg’. Its name is a direct translation of Yussef al-Qaradawi’s ideology al-Wasatiyya. The Islamic Centre is run by Europe Trust Netherlands trustee Jacob van der Blom. Van der Blom tried to crowd fund the acquisition of his rented space but failed to get the funds needed. Again Kuwaiti funders were willing to bankroll the acquisition of this building. In 2013 the building was rented and in 2014 bought for Euro 594,500. The centre also serves as the registered address for the Europe Trust Netherlands.

== Controversy in the Blue Mosque ==
In 2013 news came out in the Dutch press which stated that the Kuwaitis were in full control of the Blue Mosque in Amsterdam. Documents were leaked to prove it and also information came out that two board members of the mosque Yassin Elforkani and Jacob van der Blom were given a monthly allowance by the Kuwait Ministry of Awqaf and Islamic Affairs. According to the Kuwaiti Ministry the two are given a reimbursement every month to compensate for their Dawah activities. The focus of the board of the mosque had changed from serving the local neighborhood Muslim to active Dawah and recruitment of Dutch Muslim converts.

== Bouyafa Coup ==
On 12 July 2013 founder and former chairman of the Europe Trust Nederland made a surprising move and terminated the complete board of the ETN. He went to the Chamber of Commerce and filed a complete new board under his leadership and moved the address to his home in IJsselstein. In a swift response the real the ousted board filed a complaint with the Chamber of Commerce who investigated the case and annulled Bouyafa's move and reinstated the original board. The address of the ETN moved to its current address in Islamic Centre De Middenweg in Rotterdam.
