= Chim-Nir Aviation =

Israeli airline

IATA	ICAO	Call sign
-	ETN	CHIMNIR
- Founded: 1991
- Ceased operations: 2019
- Hubs: Herzliya Airport
- Fleet size: 14
- Headquarters: Herzliya, Israel

Chim-Nir Aviation was an airline based in Herzliya Airport, Israel. It was Israel's leading aircraft operator of specialized flying services and private helicopter services.
