= Hollywood Science =

BBC TV programme

- Country of origin: United Kingdom

Production
- Production company: BBC

Original release
- Network: BBC Two
- Release: 10 May 2001

Hollywood Science is an Open University TV programme produced for the BBC, which attempted to determine whether or not scenes in various films were scientifically credible. In the show, presenter Robert Llewellyn and scientist Jonathan Hare look at the science behind a scene in a film. They experiment or perform calculations, to see how the scene would work in real life. The scene is then given an accuracy rating. The approach is similar to that of the Bad Astronomer, who also uses films as a vehicle to teach science. The presence of Robert Llewellyn means the tone of the show is fairly light-hearted.

The show started in the BBC Learning Zone, a section of education programming broadcast in the early morning, meant to be recorded and watched later. It was then given a higher profile programming slot on BBC2 in the early evening. The programme is currently repeated on UKTV Documentary.

The series formed the basis of a Jonathan Hare lecture at Hull University in 2008.

== Episodes ==
=== Series 1 ===
The first series of six ten-minute episodes premiered in the Open University's Learning Zone on BBC2 at 12:30 from 10 May 2001.

Each of these episodes concentrated on the science of a single film.

- Shanghai Noon
- Dante's Peak
- Cool Hand Luke
- Ice Cold in Alex
- Die Hard
- Speed

=== Series 2 ===
The second series consisted of four half-hour episodes.

"Break-Ins"

- The Score – If one fills a safe with water, will an explosion produce a more powerful door-busting effect?
- Robin Hood: Prince of Thieves – Could a medieval trebuchet fire Robin Hood and Will Scarlet into a castle, and land them on target?
- The Thomas Crown Affair – Would knocking out the air conditioning cause InfraRed cameras to become useless?

"Gross Out"

- Waterworld – Is it possible to sufficiently purify one's own urine to be able to drink it? The team concluded that the film was portraying a reverse osmosis process with a realistic looking unit.
- Fight Club – Can high quality soap be made from liposuction fat? The team succeeded in making soap from pig fat, but it was not top quality soap.
- The Great Outdoors – Could someone eat a 96-ounce steak? The team concluded that this amount of meat would not fit in a human stomach, and thus gave it the "least plausible" award for the episode.

"Tricky Situations"

- Deep Blue Sea – Is it possible to be surrounded by electricity and water without being electrocuted?
- The Last Castle – How far can a water cannon fire a grappling iron?
- A View to a Kill – Can one survive underwater by breathing the air from a car tyre?

"Escapes"

- Chain Reaction – Could a hydrogen gas cylinder move a concrete slab? The team concluded it could, but probably not enough to allow escape and with a great risk of explosion.
- Escape from Alcatraz – Can one braze together a spoon and some nail clippers using a US dime, and some matches? After initial failure, the team concluded they needed a pre-1960s dime for its high silver content. Although they then succeeded in melting the dime, they failed to make a solid joint, largely due to the lack of flux. They also could not generate sufficient heat from matches, the heat source portrayed in the film.
- Hollow Man – Would you be able to move a metal bolt using a hand-made electromagnet? While this may be possible with good electromagnets, the team concluded the power source used in the film (a defibrillator) would be too feeble to do the job. This film was given the "least plausible" award of the episode.

== See also ==
- MythBusters; an Australian/American television show in which myths, urban legends, common misconceptions and the like are scientifically tested, checked, researched and evaluated; often features cases/examples from Hollywood movies.
