= Bruce Joel Rubin =

American screenwriter (born 1943)

- Born: March 10, 1943 (age 83); Detroit, Michigan, U.S.
- Other names: Bruce Rubin; Derek Saunders
- Education: Wayne State University; Tisch School of the Arts (1962)
- Occupation: Screenwriter
- Notable work: Jacob's Ladder; My Life; Ghost
- Spouse: Blanche
- Children: Ari, Joshua
- Awards: Academy Award for Best Original Screenplay (1990)
- Website: brucejoelrubin.com

Bruce Joel Rubin (born March 10, 1943) is an American screenwriter, meditation teacher, and photographer. His films often explore themes of life and death with metaphysical and science fiction elements. Prominent among them are Jacob's Ladder, My Life and Ghost, for which he received the Oscar for Best Original Screenplay. Ghost was also nominated for Best Picture, and was the highest-grossing film of 1990. He is sometimes credited as "Derek Saunders" or simply "Bruce Rubin".

== Early life ==
Born to a Jewish family and raised in Detroit, Michigan, Rubin is a 1960 graduate of Detroit's Mumford High School.

His love of theater began at the age of five when he saw his mother acting in Mary Poppins at a local high school. He later became an actor and director in high school plays.

Rubin traces his interest in filmmaking to viewing the Ingmar Bergman film Wild Strawberries at the Krim Theater in Detroit when he was a teenager. He attended Detroit's Wayne State University for two years, then transferred to NYU film school in 1962.

Rubin only took one screenwriting course at NYU and almost failed it, due in part to what he considered the confusing, non-intuitive theories on plotting and structure. His classmates at NYU included Martin Scorsese and Brian De Palma, who became the director of Jennifer, Rubin's first student script.

While still at NYU, Rubin got a job selling hot dogs and beer at the 1964 New York World's Fair. Every day he spent his lunch break at the Johnson's Wax Pavilion watching a 20-minute movie, To Be Alive! by Francis Thompson, about the commonalities of growing up in cultures across the U.S., Europe, Africa and Asia. It was viewed on three separate 18-foot screens, and a single-screen version won the Oscar for documentary (short subject). At the end, the narrator states, "Simply to be alive is a great joy." This inspired Rubin, who said he "wanted to bring that feeling into the world somehow — that it's wonderful to be alive."

== Career ==
In 1966, Rubin became an assistant film editor at NBC's evening news show, The Huntley-Brinkley Report, but an LSD experience inspired his departure on a spiritual quest a year later. He meditated in Greece and then headed for Tibet, hitchhiking through Turkey, Iran, Afghanistan and Pakistan, where he "felt embraced and expanded by each culture." He lived in ashrams in India, a Tibetan monastery in Kathmandu, a Buddhist temple in Bangkok and a Sikh temple in Singapore. He spent a month in Japan, and a week sleeping amidst excavations in the temples at Angkor Wat. But it wasn't until Rubin returned to New York City that he met his spiritual teacher, Rudi, only a few blocks away from where he began his journey. And once again, he tried to establish a film career. In 1969, he was De Palma's assistant director on Hi, Mom!, and co-directed Dionysus in 69 with De Palma and Robert Fiore. Both films were released in 1970.

David Bienstock, an independent film maker who was Curator of Film at the Whitney Museum in New York, was a friend of Rubin's and hired him as an assistant. Rubin later became Assistant Curator of Film and helped establish The New American Filmmakers Series, a launching pad for independent filmmakers and a precursor to Sundance. Rubin and Bienstock also began writing a science fiction screenplay, Quasar. Rubin recalled, "We came up with a story about an astronomer who discovers what he thinks is a giant quasar, but it turns out to be something that spiritually changes his life. That was the breakthrough. My spiritual life and my creative life merged. It all became one journey, one unfolding." The script was later optioned by Ingo Preminger, producer of the Oscar-winning movie MASH, but when Richard Zanuck, President of Warner Brothers, said he didn't understand the ending, the option expired. Zanuck would later produce Rubin's film Deep Impact.

The passing of David Bienstock and Rudi in the same year was a catalyst for Rubin and his family's move to Indiana in 1974, to be near another student of Rudi's. Over the next six years, Bruce's wife Blanche would earn her Doctorate at Indiana University while Rubin earned his master's degree, taught meditation, and took a string of odd jobs while trying to write. They moved to DeKalb, Illinois, in 1980 when Blanche was hired as a professor at Northern Illinois University. While there, Rubin began writing Jacob's Ladder and the treatment for Ghost, and waited to hear about a script he'd started in New York and sold in 1979, The George Dunlap Tape.

The director of Rubin's George Dunlap Tape script, Douglas Trumbull (2001: A Space Odyssey, Close Encounters, Blade Runner) brought in other writers, and the film opened in 1983 as Brainstorm, starring Christopher Walken and Natalie Wood, in her last film. Rubin borrowed money from a producer to travel to the Los Angeles premiere of Brainstorm. While there, Rubin and his wife talked with his former NYU classmate Brian De Palma, who Rubin credits with his move to L.A. "[Brian] said, 'Bruce, if you want a career in Hollywood you have to move here.' I had heard that a thousand times and never wanted to believe it because of the terror of moving to Hollywood and not having anybody answer your phone calls. But my wife took it to heart, and when we arrived back in Illinois she quit her job, put our house on the market, and said we're doing it. It was the most courageous act I've ever experienced."

Two weeks before Rubin and his family were leaving for L.A., they sold their home. On the same day, Rubin also got a call from his L.A. agent, dropping Rubin as a client because his work was "too metaphysical and nobody wanted to make movies about ghosts." Rubin was discouraged but his wife was not. "So we ended up moving to Hollywood with no money... and within a week I had a house and an agent. I had a writing job. I was very lucky."

Rubin's screenwriting career was assisted by a December 1983 American Film magazine (AFI) article written by Stephen Rebello titled "One in a Million," listing ten of the best unproduced scripts in Hollywood, scripts that he said "were just too good to get produced." Rebello had read 125 scripts recommended by respected industry connections. The final ten screenplays included The Princess Bride, Total Recall, At Close Range and Jacob's Ladder. Rebello wrote in part: "Admirers of Bruce Joel Rubin's Jacob's Ladder flat out refuse to describe this screenplay. Their only entreaty? 'Read it. It's extraordinary.' And it is... page for page, it is one of the very few screenplays I've read with the power to consistently raise hackles in broad daylight."

About Jacob's Ladder, Rubin wrote:

The script idea for Jacob's Ladder began as a dream: A subway late at night; I am traveling through the bowels of New York City. There are very few people on the train. A terrible loneliness grips me. The train pulls into the station and I get off. The platform is deserted. I walk to the nearest exit, and discover the gate is locked. A feeling of terrible despair begins to pulse through me as I hike to the other end of the platform. To my horror, that exit is chained, too. I am totally trapped and overwhelmed by a sense of doom. I know with perfect certainty that I will never see daylight again. My only hope is to jump onto the tracks and enter the tunnel, the darkness. The only direction from there is down. I know the next stop on my journey is hell. Partly that came out of my own fear and despair, because nothing in my life seemed to be working. In Illinois, I felt like my story had evaporated completely. My story was, 'You don't have a story.' Here you are, living in a cornfield. No friends. No work. Your wife is supporting the family. Basically, in my mind, the story was over. I could have given up my filmmaking goals and settled into a different kind of lifestyle... My story would have been: 'Okay, you tried.' Instead, I woke up from my subway dream and said, 'That's a great opening for a movie.' I then tried to write my way out of hell...

The film My Life, released in 1993, was Rubin's directorial debut.

In the next 30 years, in Los Angeles and later in New York, Rubin would write more than 30 scripts and get 11 produced while continuing his meditation practice and teaching weekly meditation classes. Rubin has stated, "Each film was an attempt, successful or not, to witness and explore the unseen world of our lives. I wanted to speak to adults and to children and to touch the inner mystery of our shared being."

Rubin wrote the book and lyrics for Ghost the Musical (the musical adaptation of Ghost) which premiered in the United Kingdom in March 2011 and opened on Broadway in Spring 2012.

Rubin's creative focus has turned to photography:

"The result of always carrying an iPhone in his pocket, he describes this new phase in his creative life as the discovery of seeing. As Bruce explains, 'The mystery and magic of the world is not hidden. It is under our feet, on old walls, in rusting garbage cans. The beauty, the wonder, never ends.' Although Bruce's film career has been entwined with the imagery of cinema, his primary focus has always been on narrative storytelling more than the visual. In recent years, he has shifted his focus to the image itself and has discovered that photographs, even in abstraction, have wonderful stories to tell."

== Personal life ==
Rubin and his wife, Blanche, split their time between Los Angeles and San Francisco, and he teaches weekly meditation classes in Dutchess County, New York. Blanche is an artist with a Doctorate in Art Education. She taught at Indiana University, Northern Illinois University, and California State University at Northridge, and was the Program Evaluator at the J. Paul Getty Institute for Education in the Arts, where she helped create a national program. Their younger son Ari, a pilot, screenwriter and former board member of the WGA, was in law school in 2018. Their son Joshua has worked as an award-winning writer of major video games like Assassin's Creed 2 and Destiny. In 2018 he was involved in the development of virtual reality projects, and worked as an Interactive Narrative Consultant with clients in the U.S. and Europe.

Rubin is gay, which his wife has long known about.

== Credits ==
=== Screenplays (produced) ===
- Brainstorm (1983)
- Deadly Friend (1986)
- Ghost (1990)
- Jacob's Ladder (1990)
- Sleeping with the Enemy (1991, uncredited)
- Deceived (1991)
- My Life (1993)
- Deep Impact (1998)
- Stuart Little 2 (2002)
- The Last Mimzy (2007)
- The Time Traveler's Wife (2009)
- Ghost: The Musical (2012, book and lyrics)
