= The Europe Trust =

The Europe Trust, formerly known as the European Trust, is a UK charity and company which lists its purpose as developing a portfolio of assets intended to fund social and economic projects for communities in Europe. The Europe Trust was founded by the Federation of Islamic Organizations in Europe (FIOE), an organization alleged to have ties with the Muslim Brotherhood in Europe.

== History and organization ==
Europe Trust is a Markfield, United Kingdom-based company and charity which was first registered as a U.K. charity in 1996 under the name European Trust and then incorporated as a U.K. company named Europe Trust in 2003. In 2004 it was again registered as a charity bearing the name Europe Trust. The 2005 financial report says that the principal activity of the company "was that of to establish a portfolio of assets (awqaf) businesses and investments to generate resources to fund social and economic projects for communities in Europe."

The Europe Trust has purchased a property in Berlin's Wedding (Drontheimer Str. 32) district for four million euros. Several associations and groups have moved in there that are being monitored by the Federal and State Office for the Protection of the Constitution (Verfassungsschutz), i.e. German domestic intelligence services.

The directors and trustees of the Europe Trust are European Muslims of Middle Eastern descent. The Europe Trust employs three staff members and has multiple volunteers. Former trustee and co-founder Dr. Ahmed Kadhem al-Rawi serves currently as the chief executive.

== Connections to the Muslim Brotherhood ==
Major news outlets as the Wall Street Journal and The Times have reported that the Europe Trust is the financial vehicle of the Muslim Brotherhood in Europe. The Wall Street Journal reported in 2005 that the European Trust was created in 1996 as the de facto fundraising arm of the Federation of Islamic Organizations in Europe in order to break the dependency of FIOE on Gulf donors. The Journal also reported that the Trust had directly subsidized projects of the FIOE, including three colleges and three local Islamic centers that affiliated with the FIOE.

The Times reported that the Europe Trust, which has property assets worth more than £8.5 million, sends rental income from its properties to an unofficial network of Brotherhood-linked organizations throughout the continent including the Muslim Association of Britain (MAB), identified by a government minister in 2010 as “the Brotherhood’s representative in the UK”.

According to the french Minister of Interior in 2025, the trust owns £20 million worth of real estate and is the financial arm of the movement in Europe.

== Connections to radicalism and terrorism ==
The Times of London reported a number of ties from the Europe Trust and/or its Trustees to various forms of terrorism:

- Europe Trust has funded a religious training institute in Wales that was attended by one of Lee Rigby’s killers.
- Ahmed al-Rawi once described Israel as a “killing machine” led by “Zionist war criminals” and in 2004, he joined leaders of Hamas and Hezbollah in demanding action to “purify the land of Islam from the filth of occupation”.
- Present and former trustees of the European Trust include senior figures in two global aid agencies banned by Israel for their alleged membership of a group said by the American government to have been “created by Hamas to transfer funds to the terrorist organisation”.
- A third trustee ran a Kuwaiti organization, Lajnat al-Dawa al-Islamiya (LDI), that was outlawed by the United Nations over funding links to al-Qaeda. Its Pakistan branch was led by the brother of Khalid Sheikh Mohammed, mastermind of the 9/11 attacks.
- A former trustee and ex-head of the Islamic Society of Germany, who was sentenced to death in absentia in Egypt for an alleged conspiracy with Brotherhood leaders. He was separately investigated but not prosecuted by German federal police for transferring money on behalf of a Salafist Saudi organization to a charity whose Bosnian branch is designated by the UN, the EU and the US as a funder of al-Qaeda.
