= Cinema X =

British film magazine

- Volume 2, No. 3 (1969)
- Editor: Tony Crawley
- Categories: Film
- Frequency: Monthly
- Publisher: Rosland Productions; Top Sellers Ltd
- Founded: 1969
- Country: United Kingdom
- Based in: London
- Language: English

Cinema X was a British film magazine best known for its coverage of sexploitation films. Early issues of the magazine were undated, but it is believed the first issue was published in 1969. The first film to grace the cover of Cinema X was Loving Feeling (1969), directed by Norman J. Warren. Other films covered in the first issue were I Am Curious (Yellow) (1967), Curse of the Crimson Altar (1968), and Therese and Isabelle (1968). Interviewees in the premiere issue included Norman J Warren, John Trevelyan and Anthony Newley.

== Origins ==
Originally "a Cinemonde publication", the magazine appears to have been envisioned by the company as the British arm of their publishing empire, which already included a similar publication in France (Cinemonde) and in Italy (King Cinemonde). Gerald Kingsland was the magazine's first editor. Very much born of the permissive climate of the late sixties, the first issue's editorial stated: “So far the more adult magazines have reserved a few pages for the X cinema ... blood and sex are only lightly touched on. Cinema X devotes all its time to the world’s X cinema.”

The founding publishing house of Cinema X was Rosland Productions. From Volume 2 Number 2 the magazine was published by Top Sellers Ltd., based in London.

== Similar publications ==
Cinema X was superficially similar to the long-running Continental Film Review, which in the late 1960s had begun filling its pages with stills of nude scenes from foreign films. However, Cinema X was far less pretentious and, being mostly in colour, much more glossy.

== Known formatting ==
Seen today, early issues of the magazine appear somewhat faceless, often consisting merely of an editorial followed by film pictorials with short plot synopses. However, around 1971/1972 the magazine began to develop more of a personality, with such regular features as 'Flash', a column by the film critic Peter Noble (1917–1997) on upcoming films, and articles on mainstream film stars under the heading 'Cine Go Round'. The 'Cineclub 24 Scene' and 'Cinecenta Scene' sections covered films that played at Membership Only Adult Cinemas. During this period the magazine was published by Top Sellers Ltd, a division of Warner Communications known as Williams Publishing, that also produced saucy books and posters, many of which were advertised in the magazine. The magazine also began accepting outside advertising; Subdean, the first company of David Sullivan, advertised in the magazine in 1972. And in 1975 the magazine produced its own 'X'-rated cinema advertisement, featuring model Nita Blair and directed by Ray Selfe.

At this point Tony Crawley was credited as managing editor, while contributing editors included William Rostler for articles on American films and Luigi Cozzi for articles on Italian cinema. The mid-seventies version of the magazine drastically reduced its page count from 82 to 31, dropping many of its earlier features. Under Crawley's editorship the magazine also adopted a more critical stance towards the films reviewed. Crawley's review of Deadly Weapons, starring Chesty Morgan, abruptly ended with Crawley proclaiming, “I can write no more, I feel ill.” Gerald Kingsland was the founding editor who was followed by Jordan Stone in the post from Volume 2 Number 3.

== Editorial stance ==
Cinema X was initially supportive of home-grown British sex films, particularly those of producer Bachoo Sen, giving over the first issue's cover to Loving Feeling (1969) and comparing his next film, Love Is a Splendid Illusion (1970), to the works of Radley Metzger and Russ Meyer. A British sex film edition followed (Vol.5, No.1), with Cinema X interviewing the likes of Pete Walker, Derek Ford and Stanley Long.

By the mid-seventies, though, Cinema X’s love affair with the British sex film had begun to falter. The then extant policies of UK censorship meant that British films had to remain softcore while the United States and most of Europe headed into the hardcore porno chic era. But Cinema X discovered that many British filmmakers were shooting hardcore versions of their films for overseas release, while never publicly admitting to doing so. Annoyed by this hypocrisy, Cinema X eventually took them to task in a review of the film Secrets of a Superstud (1975): “At Cinema X magazine we know which directors have shot porno; we've talked to their stars. But it's little use quoting them, when the directors, producers, above all their distributors, vociferously deny everything. We prefer honesty in our pages.”

== Spin-offs ==
Cinema X’s interest in the American porno scene led to a 1975 spin-off magazine called Cinema Blue, which covered the porno chic era and interviewed many of its leading lights. The magazine was short-lived however, as was an American version of Cinema X titled Cinema X International.

== Closure ==
The magazine appears to have ceased publication in the late 1970s/early 1980s.
