= Keep It in the Family (1971 TV series) =

1971 British TV sitcom

- Genre: Sitcom
- Written by: David Nobbs; Peter Vincent
- Directed by: Ian Davidson
- Starring: Tim Barrett; Vivienne Martin; Tony Maiden; Joyce Grant; Jack Haig; John Duncan
- Country of origin: United Kingdom
- Original language: English
- No. of series: 1
- No. of episodes: 6

Production
- Producer: Ian Davidson
- Camera setup: Multi-camera

Original release
- Network: ITV
- Release: 21 September – 26 October 1971

Keep It in the Family is a 1971 British television sitcom produced by Yorkshire Television which ran for six episodes. The series starred Tim Barrett, Vivienne Martin, Joyce Grant, Jack Haig, and Tony Maiden. Although wiping was common among British broadcasters of the early 1970s, the series exists in its entirety.

== Episodes ==
No.	Title	Directed by	Written by	Original release date
1	"The Occupation"	Ian Davidson	David Nobbs and Peter Vincent	21 September 1971
2	"Four Into Three Won't Go"	Ian Davidson	David Nobbs and Peter Vincent	28 September 1971
3	"Captain Angus"	Ian Davidson	David Nobbs and Peter Vincent	5 October 1971
4	"The Suit"	Keith Beckett	David Nobbs and Peter Vincent	12 October 1971
5	"Happy Event"	Keith Beckett	David Nobbs and Peter Vincent	19 October 1971
6	"The Dinner"	Keith Beckett	David Nobbs and Peter Vincent	26 October 1971
