= Inseminoid =

1981 film by Norman J. Warren

- US film poster
- Directed by: Norman J. Warren
- Written by: Nick Maley; Gloria Maley
- Produced by: Richard Gordon; David Speechley
- Starring: Robin Clarke; Jennifer Ashley; Stephanie Beacham; Steven Grives; Barrie Houghton; Rosalind Lloyd; Victoria Tennant; Trevor Thomas; Heather Wright; David Baxt; Judy Geeson
- Cinematography: John Metcalfe
- Edited by: Peter Boyle
- Music by: John Scott
- Production company: Jupiter Film Productions
- Distributed by: Butcher's Film Service
- Release date: May 1981 (UK)
- Running time: 93 minutes
- Country: United Kingdom
- Language: English
- Budget: £1 million

Inseminoid (titled Horror Planet in the United States) is a 1981 British science fiction horror film directed by Norman J. Warren and starring Judy Geeson, Robin Clarke and Stephanie Beacham, along with Victoria Tennant in one of her early film roles. The plot concerns a team of archaeologists and scientists who are excavating the ruins of an ancient civilisation on a distant planet. One of the women in the team (Geeson) is impregnated by an alien creature and taken over by a mysterious intelligence, driving her to murder her colleagues one by one and feed on them.

Inseminoid was written by Nick and Gloria Maley, a married couple who had been part of the special effects team on Warren's earlier film Satan's Slave. It was filmed between May and June 1980 on a budget of £1 million (£4 million in 2025), half of which was supplied by the Shaw Brothers. The film was shot mostly on location at Chislehurst Caves in Kent as well as on the island of Gozo in Malta, combined with a week's filming at Lee International Studios in London. Composer John Scott completed the film's electronic musical score over recording sessions that lasted many hours.

Despite a good box office response in the UK and abroad, Inseminoid failed to impress most commentators, who criticised the effects and production design. The overall quality of the acting was also poorly received, although Geeson's performance was praised. Criticism was also directed at the premise involving an alien insemination, which some commentators saw as a weak imitation of Alien (1979). Both Warren and 20th Century Fox, distributor of Alien, rejected claims that Inseminoid was influenced by that film.

== Plot ==
On a frozen planet in the future, a team of 12 Xeno Project archaeologists and scientists are excavating the ruins of an alien civilisation. They discover a cave system containing wall markings and crystals of unknown origin. During one of the surveys, a mysterious explosion cripples photographer Dean White and injures Ricky Williams. Deciphering the wall markings, exolinguist Mitch theorises that the civilisation was built on a concept of dualism: the planet orbits a binary star and seems to have been ruled by twins. Discovering that the crystals are surrounded by an energy field, Sharon, the medical assistant, suggests that the civilisation was controlled by a form of chemical intelligence.

Inside the team's base, one of the crystal samples begins to pulsate, causing the intelligence to take control of Ricky through a wound on his arm. In a delusional state, he is compelled to go back to the caves. After exiting the base, leaving the airlock's outer door open, he throws Gail into a pile of twisted metal, damaging her environmental suit and trapping her foot. Desperate to free herself, Gail removes her helmet and tries to amputate her foot with a chainsaw, but freezes to death in the planet's toxic atmosphere. Documentation officer Kate Carson shoots the returning Ricky with a harpoon gun before he opens the inner airlock door and evacuates all of the base's air.

Ricky and Gail are buried outside the base. Later, Mitch and Sandy return to the caves to collect more crystals. A monstrous alien creature appears and dismembers Mitch, then rapes Sandy with a transparent tubular phallus pumping green liquid. Sandy is taken back to the base and treated by the team's doctor, Karl, who discovers that the attack has triggered an accelerated pregnancy. When further underground explosions block off the caves, the survivors are left with nothing to do but wait for Xeno to pick them up.

The intelligence takes over Sandy, giving her superhuman strength. She stabs Barbra to death with a pair of scissors and mutilates Dean and the remains of Mitch, drinking their blood. The rest of the team take refuge in the control room as Sandy uses explosives to blow up the base transmitter. After Sandy appears to return to her normal self, Karl, Sharon and Commander Holly McKay try to sedate her. However, Sandy reverts to her violent state, killing Karl and Holly and disembowelling their corpses.

Mark radios Sandy to distract her while Kate and Gary leave the control room to arm themselves with chainsaws. Sandy uncovers the ruse and harpoons Gary outside the airlock, breathing the atmosphere to no ill effect as she kills him and feeds on his flesh. She then re-enters the base and gives birth to hybrid twins. Mark stumbles across the newborns and leaves them with Sharon as Sandy blows open the control room and smashes the equipment inside. She then uses another explosive charge to wound Kate, and kills her. Finally, Mark overpowers Sandy and strangles her to death with a cable. He returns to Sharon to find one of the twins drinking from her torn-out throat, then comes face to face with its sibling.

Twenty-eight days later, a Xeno shuttle lands on the planet to investigate the loss of contact with the team. With the base in ruins and all the occupants dead or missing, commandos Corin and Roy abandon the search for survivors and shuttle pilot Jeff radios Xeno for clearance to return. The final shots reveal that the twins have stowed away inside a storage compartment on board the shuttle.

== Cast ==
- Judy Geeson as Sandy
- Robin Clarke as Mark
- Jennifer Ashley as Holly McKay
- Stephanie Beacham as Kate Carson
- Steven Grives as Gary
- Barrie Houghton as Karl
- Rosalind Lloyd as Gail
- Victoria Tennant as Barbra
- Trevor Thomas as Mitch
- Heather Wright as Sharon
- David Baxt as Ricky Williams
- Dominic Jephcott as Dean White
- John Segal as Jeff
- Kevin O'Shea as Corin
- Robert Pugh as Roy

== Production ==
After making Satan's Slave (1976), Prey (1977) and Terror (1978), Norman J. Warren was to have directed a film called Gargoyles. After this production collapsed without a finished script, Warren and producer Richard Gordon took on a story idea from the husband-and-wife duo of Nick and Gloria Maley, who had supplied the special effects on Satan's Slave. The Maleys wrote the film both as an amalgam of their favourite science fiction ideas and to showcase their effects work. Their script, which indicated that the film is set two decades in the future in a militaristic universe, was provisionally titled either Doom Seed or Doomseeds; this was changed to Inseminoid to avoid confusion with the 1977 film Demon Seed.

Gordon cast American actors Robin Clarke and Jennifer Ashley as Mark and Holly while on business in Hollywood. Clarke had recently played a supporting role in The Formula; Ashley had appeared in a number of independent films. Beacham, who had two young children at the time, accepted the role of Kate to support her family, recalling in a 2003 interview: "I had to choose between a play that I really, really wanted to do, which would have paid me £65 a week, and this script for a film called Inseminoid. Hey! No choice. Two pink babies asleep upstairs! No choice!"

The Shaw Brothers agreed to supply half of the proposed £1 million budget and became partners in the production, with elder brother Run Run Shaw being credited as the film's presenter in the title sequence. Meanwhile, Nick Maley reprised his effects role by building the puppets of the alien twins.

=== Filming ===
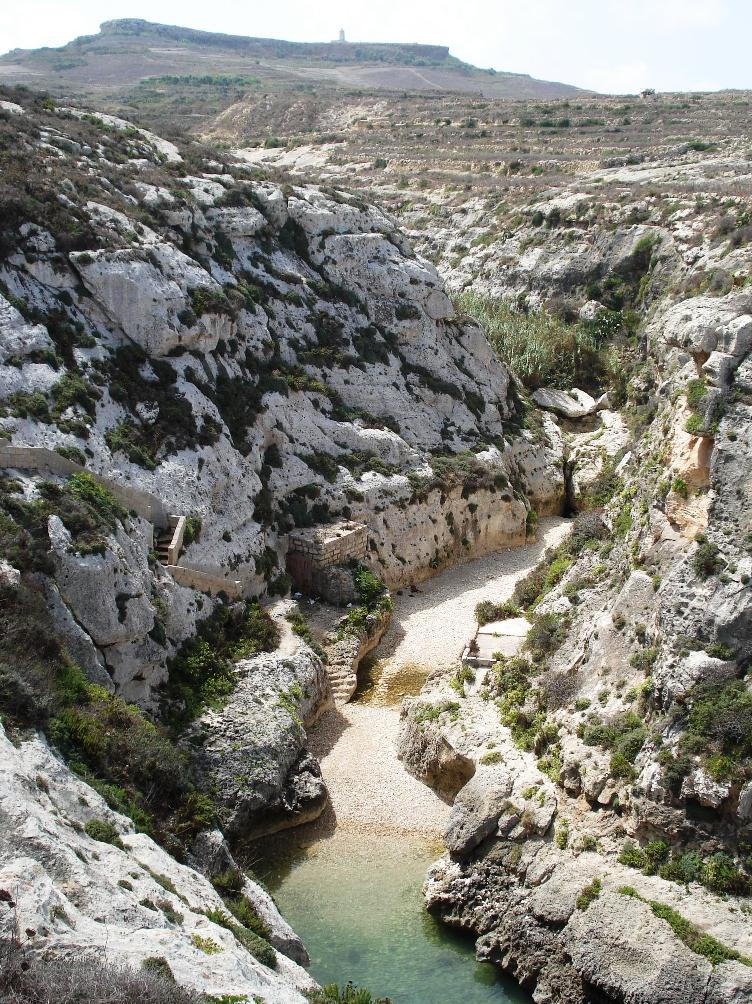
The rocky interior of Gozo, where the crew filmed for two days, represented the planet's surface.

Nick Maley's effects work included the puppets of the alien twins. In this shot, one of them is revealed to have killed Sharon (Heather Wright).

Inseminoid was shot in CinemaScope. Warren remembered that this format produced an "incredibly sharp image and what I would term as the 'American' look." Principal photography began on 12 May 1980 with a crew of 75. The production spent three weeks filming in Chislehurst Caves in Kent, which served as the tunnels of the underground complex. This was followed by one week's studio filming at Lee International Studios (the future Fountain Studios) in Wembley Park, London. A fifth week was devoted to effects and linking shots, completed by the second unit at Film House on Wardour Street. In late June, the crew travelled to the island of Gozo in Malta for a location shoot lasting two days, during which they filmed the long shots set on the planet's surface. The strong Mediterranean sun ensured good lighting.

Warren said that given Inseminoid's low budget, filming the underground scenes in actual caves produced a more realistic result than any potential studio option. However, the cold, damp and airless conditions inside the caves, compounded by the uneven terrain, caused numerous minor injuries among the cast and crew as well as damage to filming equipment. Shooting often ran for 12 hours at a time and some of those present developed intense feelings of claustrophobia in the confined space. Gordon felt that these uncomfortable working conditions made the actors' performances more credible: "I think all this paid off in terms of what we got on the screen for the budget, but the circumstances were very difficult." Due to the lack of space, the crew were forced to set up their production office, as well as the dressing and make-up rooms, in a car park some distance from the caves. As filming started to fall behind schedule, Warren was forced to cut some of the scenes of Ricky's rampage inside the caves: "Three pages of script, which I had to condense into one shot. Having to make such an enormous compromise was not a happy choice for me, but it was the only way of getting us back on schedule." In the end, the shoot overran by two days.

As filming progressed, the working relationship between Warren and Clarke broke down. According to Warren, Clarke often refused to follow instructions, opting instead to give his own interpretation of the script to a point where every scene featuring him became "an uphill struggle" to film. Warren remembered that during preparations for a fight scene, he lost his temper with Clarke: "Robin kept on ranting and raving about his ideas to the point where I couldn't take it any more. So I screamed at him to shut up and keep quiet. I told him I was the director and we would do the scene the way I said. He was shocked, he just stopped dead, and from that point on he hardly said a word."

Warren's rapport with the rest of the cast was positive. He described Geeson as "an absolute dream to work with" and praised her performance, arguing that it avoided being unintentionally comic. Gordon was similarly impressed, saying that Geeson fully embraced the role of Sandy and did not complain that it demeaned her as an actress. Warren also had memories of Beacham's "very professional" performance, recalling that "with tongue firmly in cheek, she would often wind me up by asking what her motivation was for a particular action, just as I about to call 'Action!', knowing full well that my answer would be, 'Because it's in the script'."

=== Post-production ===
The film was brightened in post-production due to concerns that it would be harder to sell to television broadcasters if it looked too dimly lit. Cuts were made to the more graphic shots of Sandy giving birth to avoid the film being refused certification by the British Board of Film Censors (BBFC). According to Warren, editor Peter Boyle "had a natural feel for the material and managed to create just the right pace and rhythm throughout the film." The title sequence was produced by Oxford Scientific Films.

=== Music ===
As the low budget precluded hiring an orchestra, Warren and composer John Scott agreed that the film should have an electronic score. The recording involved many hours of multitracking and overdubbing. Warren described the completed soundtrack as an "amazing achievement", noting that electronic scores were still "quite experimental" at the time. The soundtrack was released on LP record in 1982.

Inseminoid

Soundtrack album by John Scott
- Released: 1982
- Genre: Electronic
- Length: 34:50
- Label: Citadel Records

Track list
No.	Title	Length
1.	"Main Title"	2:35
2.	"The Chrysalis"	3:34
3.	"Virus"	2:22
4.	"Death in Space"	4:01
5.	"The Creature Strikes"	3:20
6.	"The Insemination"	2:10
7.	"Sandy's Metamorphosis"	4:02
8.	"Sandy's Warning"	1:21
9.	"Sandy Kills"	2:25
10.	"Birth of the Twins"	2:42
11.	"Death of Sandy"	2:27
12.	"Inseminoid"	3:51

== Release ==
=== Europe ===
After cuts were made, the BBFC granted an X certificate early in 1981. That November, it passed the film uncut. In 1987, the film was re-rated 18; in 2005, this was reduced to 15.

In West Germany, cinemas began showing the film in January 1981 under the title Samen des Bösen (English: Seeds of Evil). The film was commercially successful in Europe, peaking fifth at the UK box office. According to Warren, it reached number seven in France.

The film's UK promotion included regional advertising mail comprising a flyer which showed a screaming Geeson as Sandy, with the tagline "Warning! An Horrific Alien Birth! A Violent Nightmare in Blood! Inseminoid at a Cinema Near You Soon!". Warren regretted this move, commenting: "The problem with mail drops is that you have no way of knowing who lives in the house, or who will see it first. It could be a pregnant woman, and old lady, or even worse, a young child. So it was not such a good idea."

Inseminoid was one of the first films to received a VHS release not long after its initial theatrical run. According to Warren, in November 1981 the film was seventh in the UK video charts. Before the passage of the Video Recordings Act 1984, it was one of 82 "video nasties" in the UK: films whose video tapes could be confiscated and destroyed by police on the grounds of obscenity. It was re-released on VHS in 1992 and 1998.

=== North America ===
The Motion Picture Association of America gave the film an R rating for "profanity, nudity, violence, rape and gore". To Warren's displeasure, foreign distributor Almi renamed the film Horror Planet for its North American release. This was later changed back to Inseminoid. By 1987, the film had earned US$1.5 million in home video rentals in the US and Canada.

== Reception ==
At just 12 minutes in, there's action in those outer space mine shafts, with the first victim in this sci-fi horror tale kick-starting every cliché and already-stolen Alien plot point in the book [...] What follows is simply a stage for gloriously awful dialogue spouted out of amateur actors, whose deaths are more a result of pure idiocy in their dumb-as-nails characters than any kind of suspenseful horror plotting.

— Jeremy Wheeler, AllMovie

Inseminoid won the Fantafestival award for best special effects and received a Best Film nomination at Fantasporto. Roger Corman congratulated Warren on the film and considered hiring him as a director. However, Inseminoid failed to impress members of the British Academy of Film and Television Arts, who according to Warren, dismissed it as "'commercial rubbish! [...] Not the sort of thing the Academy should be showing [...] And certainly not the kind of film the British film industry should be making.'" He also remembered that it was not well liked by female audiences: "It seems it is quite common for pregnant women to have nightmares about giving birth to some kind of monster. Of course, all their complaints and their letters which were printed in the local papers only helped to increase the queue at the box office."

The Monthly Film Bulletin called the film a "debased farrago" with an "unmanageably large roll-call of interchangeable characters". Screen International argued that the characters were not credible as scientists, commenting that they "speak and behave like a crowd of schoolkids". Writing for Starburst magazine, Alan Jones expressed a preference for the British members of the cast, calling Geeson "absolutely first-rate" but criticising the "weak performances from the token Americans" Clarke and Ashley. He added that Inseminoid is "not faultless by any means", citing a predictable and often "ridiculous" plot as one of the film's failings. However, he concluded that it met audience expectations for a science fiction B movie, describing it as "far less routine and far more enjoyable than I had expected."

In the US, the Los Angeles Times described Inseminoid as "one of the most excruciatingly violent and nauseating space horror films within recent memory", with "imaginative set design and good production values, but none of that matters [...] The torture, inhumanity and exploitation are ferocious [...] This is dangerous and vile filmmaking." Variety commented that "[d]espite a generally good cast, [the] absence of an interesting script, and corners-cutting on the special effects side, spell a quick payoff." Edward Jones of Virginia's The Free Lance–Star praised the "novel touch" of casting an expectant mother as the villain, but added that "in what has to be a new low, even for extraterrestrial-horror films, all the men end up punching this pregnant woman in the stomach." He summed up the film as "no more than a mix of everything you've ever seen in a horror movie, and didn't particularly want to see again." In a review for the Boca Raton News, Skip Sheffield branded the film "horrible" and "cheapo", advising readers to "imagine Alien without the fantastic sets, convincing special effects and literate dialogue, and you have a picture of Horror Planet." He also argued that the graphic violence is not suspenseful, punning on the name Run Run Shaw in his conclusion that "Horror Planet is a film to run, run away from – fast."

AllMovie rates the film one star out of five. Reviewer Cavett Binion calls Geeson's performance "more than a bit uncomfortable to watch", describes the rape scene as "surreal and truly disgusting" and considers the choice of title "sleazy". Douglas Pratt writes that the film features poor acting and production design with "some gooey gore shots but few other thrills". He concedes that the film "goes through the motions properly, however, so fans will probably find it worth passing the time."

On the film's supposed cult status, Warren said: "If Inseminoid has become some form of cult movie, then I am very pleased and, indeed, very flattered." He added that if he were to re-make the film, he would demand a longer shooting schedule and reduce the lighting to heighten the suspense.

=== Interpretation ===
In both [Alien and Inseminoid], conventional sexuality is restored. In Alien, Ripley undresses at the end and displays herself as pleasurable to the audience; similarly, Inseminoid asserts the durability of established gender roles, despite the survival of the twins. However, unlike Alien, Inseminoid retains its power to disturb, as Sandy's words to Mark resound long after the final frame [...] The generative mother has spoken, reinforced her eternal presence, and departed to haunt the dreams of men.

— Peter Wright

Inseminoid has been criticised as a perceived imitation, "knock-off" or "rip-off" of the 1979 science-fiction horror film Alien. Peter Wright, a film historian and lecturer at the University of Liverpool, believes that the "atmospheric" cave sequences and the mess scene preceding Ricky's madness may have been inspired by Ridley Scott's film, comparing these to the scenes set on the desolate planetoid and the violent reveal of the "chestburster". Wright considers the Alien connection potentially "exploitative"; to Barry Langford of the University of London, it underlines UK cinema's dependence on its US counterpart. Alan Jones argues that "any similarity between Inseminoid and Alien is totally intentional. Except here is the basic idea contained in Alien taken to its sleaziest extreme." He finds one such parallel in the character of Kate (Stephanie Beacham), whom he likens to Ellen Ripley (Sigourney Weaver). However, he also regards Contamination (1980) and Scared to Death (1981) as less effective imitations of Scott. Edward Jones argues that the plot of Inseminoid also borrows from the novel Dracula (1897), the TV series The Bionic Woman (1976–78) and the films The Thing from Another World (1951) and Night of the Living Dead (1968).

Though he acknowledged its similarities to Alien, Warren denied claims that Inseminoid was made as an imitation, pointing out that the script for his film was completed months before Alien was released in the UK. He also said that representatives of 20th Century Fox, distributor of Alien, were shown the finished Inseminoid and even they rejected the possibility: "[I]n fact, the head of Fox sent us a very nice letter saying how much he enjoyed the film and wished us luck with the release [...] I find it flattering that anyone can compare Alien, which cost in the region of $30 million [sic], with Inseminoid, which cost less than £1 million. We must have done something right."

Wright argues that the insemination shows conflicting attitudes to reproduction: while Karl injecting Sandy's right arm with a needle (top) inhibits fertilisation, the phallus between her legs (bottom) enables it. Warren said the phallus was not meant to be a penis, but an artificial insemination tool. He added that due to censorship, the scene was shot "impressionistically, [...] like a dream": "[I]f we had shot it straight, it would have played like a rape scene and been cut out. So it has this sort of abstract quality to it that the censors didn't mind."

Various commentators have discussed Inseminoid's depiction of sexual reproduction, female sexuality, conflict between male and female gender roles, pregnancy, new motherhood and Otherness. Wright interprets Sandy's transformation as a "direct manifestation of masculine anxiety regarding female reproductive capacity". He argues that the film's horror is internalised within the seed of the alien being, which renders Sandy "woman-as-other" or "abject "Other". This is in contrast with Alien, which revolves around the transfer of "fear of woman" to "alien other". Wright argues that Inseminoid is reminiscent of Demon Seed (1977), in which a woman is raped and impregnated by an artificially-intelligent computer: "in both films, women are framed as 'Other' by their sexual congress with more conventional iconic others: the machine and the alien." In all of these films, pregnancy is depicted as a source of horror; in Inseminoid specifically, this is conveyed by the "uterine and cervical" title sequence, which to Wright suggests "entering the realm of the monstrous womb [...] the titling reveals a microscopic insect resident in the body of a larger organism."

Wright argues that the distorted representation of the womb reveals similarities to The Brood (1979), in which a woman gives birth to deformed offspring through parthenogenesis. Analysing the rape sequence itself, in which Karl uses a syringe to inject Sandy with an unknown substance, Wright makes a connection to dialogue in other scenes implying that the women on the Xeno team are regularly given contraceptive injections. Sandy's impregnation, conflicting with the suppression of fertilisation represented by Karl's hypodermic (and phallic) needle, reveals "coherent sexism": it "attacks the very notion of female sexual freedom, while suggesting, paradoxically, that contraception is the responsibility of women." Sandy's accelerated pregnancy and regression to the level of a savage add to her depiction as an abject Other or object of "male paranoia".

During the fight between Sandy and Gary, Sandy waits until Gary has half-suffocated before killing him. Wright suggests that this sequence is reassuring from a male perspective as it suggests that no woman – not even one with unnatural strength – is strong enough to kill a man in cold blood. That Sandy is ultimately killed by a man (Mark) makes her an aid in the re-empowerment of the male sex, although her offspring are quick to avenge their mother. Comparing the plot of Inseminoid to religious scripture, Christopher Partridge of Lancaster University refers to the twins as "essentially space Nephilim, technological demons with appetites and habits reminiscent of the mythic forebears."

The film's sexual references continue into the epilogue, which shows the arrival of rescuers Jeff, Corin and Roy. In an allusion to the menstrual cycle, the characters state that 28 days have passed since Xeno lost contact with the team. The deaths of the archaeologists are attributed to an "internal disturbance of some kind", which Wright describes as "an ironic phrase which encapsulates the film's vision of pregnancy as an irruption of Otherness from within."

On the subject of Larry Miller's novelisation, which he calls "imaginative and misogynistic", Wright notes a number of scenes that are absent from the film and distort the female form, causing revulsion in the reader. Miller has Sandy grow sores ooze pus from her nipples, which Wright likens to a new mother producing colostrum. Sandy accepts these unnatural changes with fascination.

== See also ==
- List of British films of 1981
- List of horror films of 1981
- List of films featuring extraterrestrials
- List of films set in the future
- List of monster movies
- Reproduction and pregnancy in speculative fiction
- Rosemary's Baby (film)
