= John Scott (composer) =

English composer and jazz musician (b. 1930)

- Born: Patrick John O'Hara Scott; November 1, 1930 (age 95); Bishopston, Bristol, England
- Occupations: Composer; conductor; arranger
- Years active: 1960s–present
- Musical career
- Also known as: Johnny Scott; Patrick John Scott
- Genres: Film score; jazz; contemporary classical; pop
- Instruments: Flute; saxophone

Patrick John O'Hara Scott (born November 1, 1930) (also credited as John Scott, Johnny Scott and Patrick John Scott), is an English composer, conductor, and jazz musician. He began his career as a pop and jazz arranger and session musician, before becoming well-known for his film and television scores, including collaborations with directors such as Richard Donner, Mike Hodges, Hugh Hudson, Norman Jewison, Irvin Kershner, Ilaiyaraaja, and Norman J. Warren. He is also a composer of contemporary classical music.

== Early life ==
Scott was born and raised in Bishopston, a suburb of Bristol, England. His father, a musician in the Bristol Police Band, gave him his first music lessons. At the age of 14, he enrolled in the British Army (in the Royal Artillery Band, Woolwich) as a boy musician to continue his musical studies of the clarinet, harp and saxophone.

== Career ==
Beginning in the 1960s, Scott toured with Ted Heath's big band, among others. He was hired by EMI to arrange and conduct some of its most popular artists and, during this time, worked with Beatles producer George Martin, playing flute in the band's 1965 recording "You've Got To Hide Your Love Away". Scott also recorded such artists as Tom Jones, Cilla Black, and The Hollies. As a musician, he played with the Julian Bream Consort, John Dankworth, Cleo Laine, Yehudi Menuhin, Nelson Riddle and Ravi Shankar.

Credited as Johnny Scott, and playing flute, he led a jazz quintet, quartet and trio during the 1960s: his three part Study for Jazz Quintet was included on the 1962 compilation album Jazz Tête-à-Tête recorded by Denis Preston. He played for Henry Mancini and was principal saxophonist in John Barry's soundtrack to the James Bond film Goldfinger (1964). For London Swings (1966), he assembled an impressive line-up of British jazz musicians, including Eddie Blair, Alan Branscombe, Leon Calvert, Duncan Lamont, Don Lusher, Ronnie Ross and others. For the quintet record Communication (1967) the lineup includes Scott himself on flute, Duncan Lamont (saxophone), David Snell (harp), Arthur Watts (bass) and Barry Morgan (drums).

=== Film and television music ===
Since the 1960s, Scott has composed for more than 100 film and television productions. Some of Scott's most praised and recognised scores are Antony and Cleopatra (1972), England Made Me (1973), North Dallas Forty (1979), The Final Countdown (1980), Greystoke: The Legend of Tarzan, Lord of the Apes (1984), The Shooting Party (1985) and Lionheart (1990).

His TV work includes the themes to the BBC current affairs programmes Nationwide and Midweek, incidental music for the ITV series Rosemary and Thyme, and documentaries by French explorer Jacques Cousteau. He also composed the instrumental piece "Gathering Crowds" for a stock music library. While the opening bars of the piece were used briefly in 1976 by ABC for its nightly national news program, the piece would later become iconic in the US for its use as the closing theme for the long-running syndicated Major League Baseball highlights show This Week in Baseball.

=== Contemporary classical music ===
Scott is also active as a classical composer (having written a symphony, a ballet, four string quartets and a guitar concerto) and as a conductor. Orchestras that he has conducted include the London Philharmonic Orchestra, the London Symphony Orchestra, the Royal Philharmonic Orchestra, the Munich Symphony Orchestra, the Berlin Radio Symphony Orchestra, the Budapest Opera Orchestra, the Lubliana Radio Orchestra and the Prague Philharmonic.

In 2006–2008, Scott served as the artistic director of the Hollywood Symphony Orchestra.

On 16 October 2013 Scott was presented with a BASCA Gold Badge Award in recognition of his contribution to music.

== Filmography ==
- A Study in Terror (1965)
- Doctor in Clover (1966)
- Stranger in the House (1967)
- The Long Duel (1967)
- Jules Verne's Rocket to the Moon (1967)
- Berserk! (1967)
- The Violent Enemy (1968)
- Amsterdam Affair (1968)
- Her Private Hell (1968)
- Loving Feeling (1969)
- Crooks and Coronets (1969)
- Twinky (1969)
- Trog (1970)
- Girl Stroke Boy (1971)
- Wake in Fright (1971)
- Antony and Cleopatra (1972)
- Doomwatch (1972)
- The Jerusalem File (1972)
- Mark of the Devil Part II (1973)
- England Made Me (1973)
- Penny Gold (1973)
- Billy Two Hats (1974)
- Craze (1974)
- Symptoms (1974)
- Hennessy (1975)
- That Lucky Touch (1975)
- Satan's Slave (1976)
- The Queen's Garden (documentary) (1976)
- The People That Time Forgot (1977)
- North Dallas Forty (1979)
- The Hostage Tower (1980)
- The Final Countdown (1980)
- Inseminoid (1981)
- Yor, the Hunter from the Future (1983)
- Greystoke: The Legend of Tarzan, Lord of the Apes (1984)
- The Shooting Party (1985)
- The Whistle Blower (1986)
- King Kong Lives (1986)
- The Clan of the Cave Bear (1986) (rejected)
- Man on Fire (1987)
- A Prayer for the Dying (1987) (rejected)
- White Water Summer (1987) (rejected)
- Shoot to Kill (1988)
- The Deceivers (1988)
- Winter People (1989)
- Black Rainbow (1989)
- King of the Wind (1990)
- Lionheart (1990)
- Ruby (1992)
- Far from Home: The Adventures of Yellow Dog (1995)
- The Second Jungle Book: Mowgli & Baloo (1997)
- 20,000 Leagues Under the Sea (1997)
- The New Swiss Family Robinson (1998)
- Time of the Wolf (2002)
- The Wicker Tree (2011)
