= Outer Touch =

1979 British film by Norman J. Warren

- American release poster, showing the alternative title Spaced Out
- Directed by: Norman J. Warren
- Screenplay by: Andrew Payne
- Story by: David Speechley
- Produced by: David Speechley
- Starring: Glory Annen; Barry Stokes; Michael Rowlatt; Kate Ferguson; Lynne Ross; Ava Cadell
- Cinematography: John Metcalfe; Peter Sinclair
- Edited by: Jim Elderton
- Music by: Emil Zoghby (title music)
- Production company: Three-Six-Two Film Productions
- Distributed by: Miracle Films (UK); Miramax Films (US)
- Release dates: April 1979; August 1979 (UK); 1981 (US)
- Running time: 77 minutes
- Country: United Kingdom
- Language: English
- Budget: £350,000 – £400,000

Outer Touch (American title Spaced Out, also known as Outer Reach and Outer Spaced) is a 1979 British science fiction sex comedy film directed by Norman J. Warren and starring Glory Annen, Barry Stokes and Ava Cadell. The screenplay was written by Andrew Payne from a story by David Speechley.

== Plot ==
Aliens from Betelgeuse crash-land on Earth in their malfunctioning cargo ship. Their arrival draws the attention of four sexually frustrated humans in a nearby park: Oliver and Prudence (a mild-mannered professional and his highly-strung fiancée), Willy (a bumbling young shop assistant) and Cliff (a middle-aged man walking his dog). The quartet wander into the ship and encounter its all-female crew: engineer Partha, nurse Cosia and the captain, known as Skipper. Willy inadvertently drops some pornographic magazines that he has just bought. The aliens mistake a herd of approaching cows for an attacking force and hurriedly take off despite the computer's warnings about the fragile state of the ship's systems.

Resuming their original course, the aliens study their guests in detail. Fascinated by the anatomy of the males, they decide to sell them to a zoo for exotic life forms on a distant planet. They also debate the significance of the acts depicted in Willy's magazines. Partha is particularly keen to emulate them and enthusiastically has sex with Cliff. However, Cliff soon regrets this as he physically cannot keep up with the energetic Partha, who has gained an extreme liking for sex and wants to have it non-stop, forcing Cliff to flee the room.

The aliens subject the males to a series of tests to learn more about their abilities. Oliver and Cliff fail miserably, but Willy, searching for his magazines, beats Skipper's combat simulation by unknowingly evading her attacks, causing her to collapse with exhaustion. While conducting a physical examination on Willy, Cosia discovers that his biology is more advanced than anything known to their species. Intriguing Cosia with exaggerated claims about his sexual prowess, Willy loses his virginity to her. Later, he passes an intelligence test by a fluke and has sex with Partha.

In the recreation area, Oliver seeks relationship advice from an artificial intelligence resembling a Wurlitzer jukebox. At the Wurlitzer's suggestion, he adopts a "caveman" approach to seducing Prudence. Shocked by Oliver's behaviour, Prudence flees to a luxurious bedroom, where she relaxes and has sex with him. Meanwhile, Cliff tries to avoid Partha's advances but ends up getting himself trapped in a chair-like machine that the aliens use for sexual intercourse, which causes him excruciating pain.

Awed by Willy's supposed physical and intellectual superiority, the aliens propose to return the others to Earth but take him with them. Willy is reluctant to leave his planet behind but agrees when Skipper, wanting to confirm Cosia and Partha's findings for herself, allows him to seduce her. The ship touches down safely and Oliver, Prudence and Cliff depart. However, the subsequent launch causes a fatal overload and the ship explodes, killing Willy and the three aliens. The disembodied voices of the computer and the Wurlitzer are left stranded in space.

== Cast ==
- Barry Stokes as Oliver
- Tony Maiden as Willy
- Glory Annen as Cosia
- Michael Rowlatt as Cliff
- Ava Cadell as Partha
- Kate Ferguson as Skipper
- Lynne Ross as Prudence
- Noel Davis as computer voice (British version)
- Jeff de Hart as computer voice (American version)
- Bill Mitchell as voice of the Wurlitzer (British version)
- Bob Saget as voice of the Wurlitzer (American version)

== Production ==
After Loving Feeling (1968), Norman J. Warren had moved away from sex comedies and gone on to direct the horror films Satan's Slave (1976), Prey (1977) and Terror (1978). Outer Touch was inspired by Close Encounters of the Third Kind (1977): the original script, presented to Warren by producer David Speechley, was called "S.E.C.K." (Sexual Encounters of the Close Kind). Warren, who found the script "funny but very corny", agreed to direct the film on the condition that he be allowed to revise the story. He described the premise as a cross between a Carry On and Fire Maidens from Outer Space (1956) and found the finished film "dreadful in a nice sort of way". The title is a play on the expression "out of touch".

=== Filming ===
The film was made on a budget of £350,000 to £400,000 (roughly £1.72 – £1.97 million in 2025). Production began on 22 January 1979 and ran for four weeks. The film was mostly shot at Twickenham Studios and Bray Studios, with the opening scenes filmed on location in Marble Hill Park, Twickenham. Warren said that Barry Stokes, whom he had first directed in Prey, based his performance partly on Christopher Reeve's portrayal of Clark Kent in Superman (1978).

The section of spaceship that appears in the park was created using scaffolding covered with plastic sheets. The lighting of these scenes was intended to pastiche Close Encounters of the Third Kind. Some of the props were first used in Star Wars, which was being filmed at the nearby Pinewood Studios.

The scale model shots of the spaceship were stock footage originally filmed for the TV special The Day After Tomorrow (1975). Due to the variety of shots used, the appearance of the ship changes throughout the film.

== Release ==
In the United States, the film was released as Spaced Out in 1981 by the newly founded Miramax, which re-edited the film to include new voiceovers for the computer and the Wurlitzer, as well as new music and an upbeat ending. The new Wurlitzer dialogue was scripted by Harvey Weinstein and voiced by Bob Saget. Warren, who was not consulted on the alterations, said the only change he "really liked" was the title, as he thought "Outer Touch" to be "quite negative-sounding".

The film remained unavailable on any home video format until 2008, when the original UK cut (bearing the American title "Spaced Out") was released on DVD by Odeon Entertainment. Prior to its DVD release, the film had never been shown on UK television.

== Critical response ==
At the time of the UK release in 1979, The Monthly Film Bulletin wrote: "This slap-and-tickle, shoe-string parody of recent science fiction movies gratifyingly lacks any of the usual directorial knowingness. The spacewomen are rather fetchingly clad in a mixture of frou-frou and black leather; and the cast – particularly the ingenuous Ava Cadell as the frequently oil-besmirched engineer – achieve a kind of capering charm." Screen International described the film as "[a]n over-eager effort to be both sexy and farcical, which ventures just that bit too far into the women-hating/fearing world of the fetishist [...] The more amusing and imaginative ideas (like the petulance of the jukebox psychiatrist) get lost in the episodic frenzy of the whole."

When the re-edited film was released in the US in 1981, The New York Times wrote: "Aside from a nearly quotable joke about ''luudes and nudes', there's not much that can be printed from the film Spaced Out, a softcore pornographic space comedy [...] The rock music – by an assortment of bands led by The Chance – is agreeable, the sex flippant and the dialogue, by Bob Saget, Jeff de Hart and Andrew Payne, fairly funny. Variety magazine called the action "cheap and silly, with hokey spaceship models, campy set design and costumes, plus lots of pastel lighting effects." It noted that the UK version had been "hybridised" by adding "Americanised low-humour commentary" from the re-voiced computer and Wurlitzer, including "drug culture- and gay-oriented jokes".

Later reviews have been negative. Radio Times rates the film one star out of five. TV Guide calls it "[a]n amateurish British sex comedy [...] There are spoofs of Star Wars and 2001: A Space Odyssey, as well as some teenage gutter humour, none of which amounts to anything remotely funny." Review website DVD Drive-In comments: "Just be thankful that this ends well before the 80-minute mark, and that Warren went back to the horror genre."
