= Françoise Pascal =

British actress, singer

- Born: Françoise Pascal; Vacoas, Mauritius
- Occupations: Actress; singer; dancer; fashion model; producer
- Years active: 1967–present
- Known for: La rose de fer; Mind Your Language; Burke & Hare; There's a Girl in My Soup; Keep It Up Downstairs
- Children: 1
- Website: francoisepascal.co.uk

Françoise Pascal is a Mauritius-British actress, singer, dancer, fashion model, and producer. She appeared in numerous film and television productions at her peak throughout the late 1960s to early 1980s.

== Career ==
=== Acting ===
Pascal's earliest films were Norman J. Warren's Loving Feeling and Pete Walker's School for Sex (both 1969), and she also appeared in a scene in Incense for the Damned (1970). She also played Paola in There's a Girl in My Soup (1970) with Peter Sellers. She also performed in Burke & Hare. (1972), playing Marie, and another Sellers film, Soft Beds, Hard Battles (1974).

After that appearance, she moved to France where she starred in such films as Et si tu n'en Veux Pas (1974) and Les Raisins de la Mort (1978), directed by Jean Rollin. Later she returned to England to appear in Keep It Up Downstairs (1976) alongside Diana Dors, Jack Wild, and Mary Millington.

Her first television work came in October 1971 with a role in Coronation Street, playing Ray Langton's friend. Then came guest starring roles in an episode of Play of the Month for the BBC in "Don Quixote" (1973) with Rex Harrison and for ITV's Sunday Night Theatre "Giants & Ogres" (1971). She was cast in guest starring appearances in many television comedy series such as Happy Ever After (1976) with Terry Scott and June Whitfield, as well as My Honourable Mrs (1975) with Derek Nimmo for the BBC. She co-starred in an episode of the thriller You're on Your Own starring Denis Quilley, for the BBC.

She played Danielle Favre in the first three series of the ITV sitcom Mind Your Language (1977–79); she then took on her stage roles in Happy Birthday (reuniting with Frazer Hines), and starring in a pantomime of Aladdin. Pascal left for the United States in 1980, where she acted in Hollywood, returning to England in 1987.

In 2015, Pascal joined the cast for a new comedy series called For the Love of Ella. The series also starred Ewen Macintosh, Bobby Ball, Alex Reid, Daniel Peacock, Melanie Sykes, Darren Day, and Billy Pearce.

Pascal is set to appear in and produce her first film Cold Sun, directed by Jason Figgis and starring Tara Reid, Patrick Bergin, and Ian Ogilvy, through her own MFC Productions Ltd and Pascal Productions Ltd.

In recent years Pascal has introduced a regular music show on Radio Free Marseille.

== Filmography ==
=== Film ===
Year	Title	Role	Notes
1968	Loving Feeling	Model	film debut
1968	Sympathy For The Devil	Self	documentary
1969	School for Sex	Sally Reagan	
1970	There’s A Girl In My Soup	Paola	
1971	Incense For The Damned		uncredited
1971	The Anatomy of a Pin-Up	Self	documentary short
1971	The Beloved		uncredited
1972	Burke & Hare	Marie	
1973	The Iron Rose	La femme	
1974	Soft Beds, Hard Battles	Madeline	
1976	Le Body Shop	Margot	
1976	Keep It Up Downstairs	Mimi	
1976	Private Lives	Louise	television film
1978	The Grapes of Death	Train passenger	scenes deleted
1986	Lighting White Stallion	Marie Ward Leeman	
1986	My Man Adam	Seductive Woman at Bar	
2013	Symbols and Signs	Isabella	short film
2015	For The Love of Ella	Maitre’d	television film
2016	Respectable: The Mary Millington Story	Herself	documentary film
2020	Jeepers Creepers	Fantasy Lover	voice
2021	Cold Sun	Madeline Bouvier	also producer

=== Television ===
Year	Title	Role	Notes
1971	Coronation Street	Françoise Dubois	1 episode
1971	ITV Saturday Night Theatre	Secretary	1 episode
1972	Go Girl	Martine	unaired series
1972–1973	BBC Play of the Month	Harlot/Rosa González	2 episodes
1974	Napoleon and Love	Elzunia	1 episode
1974	Late Night Drama	Cynthia Crumpet	1 episode
1975	You’re On Your Own	Suzanne Fermont	1 episode
1975	My Honorable Mrs	Anna-Maria	1 episode
1975	Rule Britanna!	Colette	1 episode
1976	The Brothers	Thérèse d’Alamber	2 episodes
1976	Happy Ever After	Michelle	1 episode
1976	What’s on Next?	Self	1 episode
1977	Whodunnit	Vere Le Grand	1 episode
1977–1979	Mind Your Language	Danielle Favre	29 episodes
1978	Celebrity Squares	Herself	4 episodes
1978	Those Wonderful TV Times	Herself	1 episode
1979	Blankety Blank	Herself	1 episode
1980	The Dick Emery Hour	Herself	TV special
1981	Mike Yarwood In Persons	Louise	1 episode
1981	Punchlines!	Herself	1 episode
1982	Gavilan	Carla	1 episode
1995	Doing Rude Things	Herself	Documentary TV movie

== Discography ==
Title	Year	Album
"When It Comes To Love"	1968	When It Comes To Love/Got It Badly-Single
"Got It Badly"	1968	When It Comes To Love/Got It Badly-Single
"Woman Is Free"	1979	Woman Is Free-Single
"Symphony Just For Me"	1979	Woman Is Free-Single
"I Can’t Get Enough"	1981	I Can’t Get Enough-Single
"Make Love To Me"	1981	I Can’t Get Enough-Single

== Personal life ==
Pascal had a child, Nicholas Johnson, with actor Richard Johnson in 1976 – the same year he divorced his third wife and married his fourth.

On 4 December 2010, she joined Rolling Stones guitarist Ronnie Wood at Claygate Village to turn on the village Christmas lights and sing a solo of "Silent Night".

In December 2012, Pascal took part in the ITV1 programme Storage Hoarders, in which she sorted and sold at auction some of her more valuable possessions which she had kept in storage for months.

One of Pascal's closest friends was British actress, Lynne Frederick. She first became acquainted with Frederick in 1972, when they co-starred on an episode of the television anthology series, BBC Play of the Month. The two actresses quickly became "firm friends" and frequently saw each other during the height of their careers in the 1970s. Pascal recalled that they regretfully lost contact in 1977 after Frederick married Peter Sellers. Frederick died in 1994. In April 2020, a few weeks before the 26th anniversary of Frederick's death, Pascal tweeted a photo of herself and Frederick, with the caption "I think of her very often! Always had that fresh baby face! RIP Lynne! Xxx".
