= Spaced Out (disambiguation) =

Spaced Out may refer to:

- Spaced Out, French–Canadian animated television show
- Spaced Out, US-title of British science fiction comedy Outer Touch
- Spaced Out – The Very Best of Leonard Nimoy & William Shatner, 1997 compilation album
- “Spaced Out”, an episode of the Japanese-American animated TV show Hi Hi Puffy AmiYumi
