= Glory Annen =

Canadian actress (1952–2017)

- Born: Glory Anne Clibbery; September 5, 1952; Kenora, Ontario, Canada
- Died: April 24, 2017 (aged 64); London, England
- Education: Webber Douglas Academy of Dramatic Art
- Occupation: Actress
- Years active: 1977–2002

Glory Annen (born Glory Anne Clibbery; September 5, 1952 – April 24, 2017) was a Canadian actress.

== Career ==
Glory Anne Clibbery was born in Kenora, Ontario, Canada. She attended the Victoria Composite High School of Performing Arts in Edmonton, Alberta, Canada and at age 17 she emigrated to England to further her education at Webber Douglas Academy of Dramatic Art, graduating in 1976. She remained based in England but worked around the world as she pursued an acting career.

She made her first movie, Cruel Passion, in 1974, at age 22. She worked on several films with the cult filmmaker Norman J. Warren including Prey (1977) and Outer Touch (1979), and on the Australian production Felicity (1979) for John D. Lamond. Her other films include The Lonely Lady (1983) and bit-parts in Supergirl (1984), Water (1985) and True Files (2002), also with John D. Lamond.

She was interviewed for the 2008 documentary Not Quite Hollywood: The Wild, Untold Story of Ozploitation! about the Australian film industry. She did some radio and voice work including dubbing Anat Atzmon 'Nili' in the feature film Lemon Popsicle. She also appeared in several English television series in the 1970s and had leading roles in the theatre, including creating the role of Deborah Solomon in the David Mamet play, Sexual Perversity in Chicago in London's West End. She was featured on television in many commercials and began working as a commercial casting director in 1982. She was also a cartoonist, artist and writer.

== Death ==
Glory Annen Clibbery died on April 24, 2017, in London.

== Personal life ==
Clibbery was the partner of racehorse owner Ivan Allan for twelve years, beginning in 1992. After their relationship ended in 2004, she and her mother Marguerite were evicted from The Gables -- a £1.7 million, nine-bedroom house in Newmarket, Suffolk owned by Allan.

Clibbery was a party to a landmark British court case, Clibbery v. Allan (2002), which established that parties to ancillary relief court proceedings may generally expect the information they have provided about their finances to remain confidential and protected from publication.

Since her death, several documents Clibbery compiled regarding her relationship with Allan have been released. They are currently being edited into a series of exposés of Allan, the British Court system and alleged criminality within the horse-racing industry.

== Filmography ==
| Year | Title | Role | Notes |
|---|---|---|---|
| 1977 | Prey | Jessica | |
| 1977 | Cruel Passion | Nun / Prostitute | Uncredited |
| 1978 | Felicity | Felicity Robinson | |
| 1979 | Outer Touch | Cosia | |
| 1983 | The Lonely Lady | Marion | |
| 1984 | Supergirl | Midvale Protestor | |
| 1985 | Water | Hostess | |
| 2002 | True Files | Featured Dancer #1 | Final film role |
