= Her Private Hell =

Her Private Hell may refer to:

- Her Private Hell (1968 film), a British sexploitation film directed by Norman J. Warren
- Her Private Hell (2026 film), a thriller film directed by Nicolas Winding Refn

== See also ==
- Private Hell (disambiguation)
