= Private Hell =

Private Hell may refer to:

- Private Hell, a 1962 novel by George H. Smith
- "Private Hell", a song by Alice in Chains from Black Gives Way to Blue
- "Private Hell", a song by Iggy Pop from Skull Ring
- "Private Hell", a song by Imperial Drag from Demos
- "Private Hell", a song by Jackyl from Push Comes to Shove
- "Private Hell", a song by Misery Loves Co. from Misery Loves Co.
- "Private Hell", a song by the Jam from Setting Sons
- "Private Hell", a song by Zan Clan from Citizen of Wasteland

== See also ==
- Private Hell 36, a 1954 film noir directed by Don Siegel
- Her Private Hell (disambiguation)
