= For a Few Dollars Less =

1966 film

For a Few Dollars Less (Per qualche dollaro in meno)
- Original film poster
- Directed by: Mario Mattoli
- Written by: Bruno Corbucci; Sergio Corbucci; Mario Guerra; Vittorio Vighi
- Produced by: Franco Palaggi
- Starring: Lando Buzzanca
- Cinematography: Giuseppe Aquari
- Edited by: Sergio Montanari
- Music by: Marcello Giombini
- Release date: 11 August 1966
- Running time: 100 minutes
- Country: Italy
- Language: Italian

For a Few Dollars Less (Italian: Per qualche dollaro in meno) is a 1966 Italian comedy film, a parody of Sergio Leone's For a Few Dollars More (the second film of his Dollars Trilogy), directed by Mario Mattoli and starring Lando Buzzanca. It was Mattoli's final film. The film was co-written by the brothers Bruno and Sergio Corbucci.

== Cast ==
- Lando Buzzanca as Bill
- Raimondo Vianello as Frank
- Elio Pandolfi as Il messicano
- Gloria Paul as Juanita
- Lucia Modugno as Sally
- Angela Luce as La donna del Ranch
- Luigi Pavese as Il padre del messicano
- Carlo Pisacane as Calamity John
- Calisto Calisti as Lo sceriffo
- Pietro Tordi as Black
- Adalberto Rossetti as Un bandito
- Tony Renis as Little Joe
- Valeria Ciangottini as Jane
