= Peter Sproule =

English actor (1947–2010)

- Born: 1947; Hitchin, Hertfordshire, England
- Died: 27 September 2010 (aged 62–63)
- Occupation: Actor
- Years active: 1968–2007

Peter Sproule (1947 – 27 September 2010) was an English actor. His roles include a guest appearance on an early episode of Upstairs, Downstairs. He trained at the Royal Academy of Dramatic Art and made his first appearance at the Bristol Old Vic in 1968. Sproule died on 27 September 2010.

== Filmography ==
Year	Title	Role	Notes
1968	if....	Barnes: Whips	
1972	Adult Fun	Assistant Office Manager	
1974	The Land That Time Forgot	Hindle	
1978	Terror	Policeman	
1980	The Mouse and the Woman	Miles	
1985	White City	Drunken customer	
1994	Don't Get Me Started	Vagrant	Uncredited
1996	Element of Doubt	Inspector Trainor	
2003	I'll Sleep When I'm Dead	Cyclist	
2007	Irina Palm	Physio	(final film role)
