= Terror (1978 film) =

Supernatural horror film by Norman J. Warren

- UK theatrical release poster
- Directed by: Norman J. Warren
- Screenplay by: David McGillivray
- Story by: Les Young; Moira Young
- Produced by: Les Young; Richard Crafter
- Starring: John Nolan; Carolyn Courage; James Aubrey; Sarah Keller; Tricia Walsh; Glynis Barber
- Cinematography: Les Young
- Edited by: Jim Elderton
- Music by: Ivor Slaney
- Production company: Crystal Film Productions
- Distributed by: Entertainment Film Distributors
- Release dates: November 1978 (United Kingdom); 13 July 1979 (Chicago)
- Running time: 84 minutes
- Country: United Kingdom
- Language: English
- Budget: £50,000 (estimated)

Terror is a 1978 British supernatural slasher film written by David McGillivray and directed by Norman J. Warren. It stars John Nolan and Carolyn Courage as two cousins who fall victim to a curse that a witch placed on their ancestors.

Conceived as a "fun horror film" with a simple premise, Terror was shot in various locations around London and Surrey. Although it was a box office success in the United Kingdom, it has received a mixed critical response for its storytelling and visual style, both of which were inspired by the Italian supernatural horror film Suspiria (1977). Warren's plans for a sequel were unrealised.

== Plot ==
Three hundred years ago, the witch Mad Dolly is captured on the orders of Lord Garrick. She is about to be burned at the stake when she invokes the Devil, causing one of her executioners to catch fire. Garrick rushes back to his house, where a disembodied arm bursts through a wall and strangles him. Lady Garrick is confronted by a sword-wielding Mad Dolly, who beheads her and curses the family's descendants.

Credits roll, revealing that these scenes form the ending of a horror film directed by James Garrick – the last of the Garrick line with his cousin Ann, an aspiring actress. James is hosting a preview screening for Ann and their friends at the largely unchanged Garrick house, which he now owns. He believes his film to be based on true events and has also inherited Mad Dolly's sword.

Gary, a mesmerist, hypnotises Ann as a party trick. In her trance, Ann picks up the sword and swings it at James, wounding him slightly. After being overpowered by the other guests, she comes to her senses and leaves the house. When Carol departs, she is stabbed to death in the surrounding woods by an unseen assailant. Ann returns to her hostel in London with bloodstained hands, watched by her roommate Suzy.

When her car breaks down on a country road at night, Suzy makes her way to a nearby house to seek help. Finding no one at home, she telephones a garage to request a tow truck. While waiting to be picked up, she has several near misses with a tall, shadowy figure who appears to be stalking her, leaving her terrified. However, this is revealed to be the garage mechanic.

More murders and strange deaths follow. At the strip club where Ann and her friends work as waitresses, a patron is ejected by a bouncer after groping Ann; on returning home, he is thrown onto a row of spiked railings and dismembered. At James's film studio, an overhead lamp falls to the floor and crushes Les, a short-tempered director trying to shoot a sex film called Bathtime with Brenda. Viv – the title character, and one of Ann's friends – is stabbed to death at the hostel. Ann visits James's assistant Philip at the studio and tells him that she has no memory of her attack on James or how she got home the night Carol was murdered. After she leaves, props and equipment start flying around the studio and pelting Philip, who is then decapitated by a falling sheet of glass.

Ann flees the hostel when she comes across Suzy being questioned by police about her and Viv. An officer pursues her but is repeatedly run over and crushed by his car, which is being driven by a supernatural force. While making her way to the Garrick house, Ann is caught in unusually strong winds and takes refuge in a parked car; she is forced to jump out when the vehicle inexplicably rises into the air. Reaching the house, she experiences bizarre visions and sees various objects moving of their own accord. She is startled by the sudden arrival of an unseen figure and strikes him down with an axe, only to find she has killed James. The spirit of Mad Dolly re-appears, cackling, as her sword flies across the room and fatally impales Ann against a wall.

== Cast ==
- John Nolan as James Garrick
- Carolyn Courage as Ann Garrick
- James Aubrey as Philip
- Sarah Keller as Suzy
- Tricia Walsh as Viv
- Glynis Barber as Carol Tucker
- Michael Craze as Gary
- Rosie Collins as Diane
- Chuck Julian as Club Patron
- Elaine Ives-Cameron as Dolores Hamilton
- Patti Love as Mad Dolly
- Mary Maude as Lady Garrick
- William Russell as Lord Garrick
- Peter Craze as Les
- Peter Sproule as Policeman
- Peter Mayhew as Mechanic
- Milton Reid as Bouncer
- David McGillivray as TV Reporter
- Alan Jones (uncredited) as Party Guest

== Production ==
We had the money for a low-budget film, but no script and no idea of what film we wanted to make. We just knew we didn't want to make a film with a complicated story and wall-to-wall dialogue. After seeing Suspiria, which was a breath of fresh air and a great inspiration to me, we made a list of all the scenes we'd like to see in a horror film. We handed the list to writer David McGillivray, who incorporated the ideas into a "sort of story".

— Warren on the film's conception

Terror was director Norman J. Warren's second collaboration with producers Les and Moira Young and Richard Crafter, with whom he had made Satan's Slave (1976). According to Warren, Terror was conceived as a "fun horror film" intended solely to entertain. The plot was therefore kept simple, taking the form of a series of murder set pieces. Warren and others pitched ideas for various scenes, from which David McGillivray wrote a script. Warren admitted that much of the film "doesn't make sense, because many of the people who get killed have nothing to do with the cursed family."

Warren and his associates, who had struggled to obtain funding for their earlier films, used the box office revenue from Satan's Slave to finance the new film on their own. According to Warren, the budget "from script to answer print" was about £50,000 (roughly £300,000 in 2025). He said that being able to make Terror as a "truly independent film" was advantageous from a creative point of view as they "didn't have to show the script to anybody." Various aspects of the film – including the plot, lighting, music and sound effects – were inspired by Dario Argento's Suspiria (1977). However, Warren maintained that Terror is not a mere copy of that film: "It was just liberating in that you could suddenly get away with doing whatever you liked."

While casting the film, Warren and associate producer Moira Young deliberately sought out new actors with no film experience. All the roles were cast in two months. The characters played by Glynis Barber and Elaine Ives-Cameron did not appear in the original script; they were written in because Warren and Young were impressed by the actresses' auditions and were determined to use them. Ives-Cameron based her performance as Dolores Hamilton, the owner of the Theatre Girls' Hostel, on Gloria Swanson as Norma Desmond in the film Sunset Boulevard (1950).

=== Filming ===
Terror was shot in four weeks in various locations around London and Surrey. Filming began on 5 June 1978. Both Warren and producer Les Young noted that due to the multiple locations, the logistics of the shoot were more complicated than those of Satan's Slave. The filming location for the Garrick residence was Admiral's Walk, the house of the Baron and Baroness DeVeuce in Pirbright; this had previously been the main location for Satan's Slave. Many of the woodland scenes were shot on the surrounding estate. In a 2009 interview, Warren described the house as the "perfect location" as it was "huge and could be used in so many different ways." The opening party scenes were filmed in a single June evening. A nearby lodge provided the location of the false stalker sequence with Suzy and the mechanic. Warren conceded that this sequence makes no sense, describing it as a "10-minute red herring".

Scenes set at the Theatre Girls' Hostel were filmed at a nurses' hostel in Holland Park, while a club in Richmond supplied the location for the club where Ann works. James's office at Garrick Studios was represented by the actual office of production company Crystal Film Productions, based in Harlesden. Scenes set on the studio floor were filmed over two days at Acorn Studios in Barnes. Other filming locations included: a street in Victoria; Wood Lane, Shepherd's Bush; Queensway, Bayswater; Barnes railway station; and Barnes Common. Many of the outdoor scenes were shot night-for-night; this proved challenging as the decision to film during the summer meant that the nights were short, forcing the crew to keep to a tight schedule.

The character Philip was a replacement for Gary, whose actor, Michael Craze, was forced to leave the production after suffering an epileptic seizure on set. Nine defective prints of the film Saturday Night Fever (1977), obtained from The Rank Organisation, were used to create the mass of film stock that attacks Philip before he is killed. Some of the background actors featured in the film-within-a-film sequence were employees of BBC Radio London, where McGillivray was working at the time. Other small parts were played by members of the crew; for example, McGillivray appears in one scene as a TV reporter.

=== Post-production ===
The music was produced as a series of sound patterns by Ivor Slaney, who had previously scored Prey. Warren then matched these patterns to various scenes to create the soundtrack. Warren also oversaw the sound effects, some of which he produced himself by recording his own voice backwards.

The end credits include a joke entry naming the actress who plays Mad Dolly as "L.E. Mack". This character was in fact played by Patti Love.

== Release and reception ==
The scene of Viv's murder was cut prior to the film's UK release to remove shots of a knife going through the character's feet. Terror was a commercial success in the UK, where it spent a week as the box office number one. In the United States, it took $190,000 (roughly $800,000 in 2025) during its opening week in Chicago.

=== Critical response ===
Reviewing the film at the time of its release, Tom Milne of The Monthly Film Bulletin described Terror as a "curious mixture". He praised the "bright dialogue", "excellent camerawork" and "Hitchcockian" moments of suspense, while criticising the "statutory" plot and use of violent close-ups: "Crude and unconvincing, disrupting the atmosphere otherwise so carefully built up, these shots turn the film into something cheap and nasty." Variety magazine wrote of the film: "Warren emphasises gore above all other elements [...] and [the] chief attribute is co-producer Les Young's artsy lensing. Rest of tech credits are murky to poor." Cinefantastique criticised the pacing, noting a large number of "meandering side plots and red herrings". It also stated: "A couple of set pieces might have looked good on paper, but they are merely ludicrous on screen."

UK critical response remains mixed. Jo Botting of Screenonline is complimentary: "The effects work extremely well for a low-budget film and, where they are less skilful, expert camerawork and judicious editing hide many of their shortcomings." She argues that Terror's use of violent and sexually explicit images makes it stylistically similar to European exploitation films. Radio Times critic Alan Jones, who has an uncredited role in the film and gives it two stars out of five, sums up Terror as "efficient if rather nonsensical" and a "cheap British riposte" to Suspiria, but also calls it "one of the last great British horror independents". Time Out magazine considers the film "stock schlock" partly redeemed by its dialogue and camerawork, also comparing it to The Exorcist (1973). By contrast, the website TV Cream calls it a "rubbish Suspiria knock-off", adding: "Unless you love badly-acted, no-budget, plotless haunted house gore-fests with no style, humour or any redeeming features whatsoever, we say don't bother."

American reviews also vary. AllMovie rates Terror one star out of five. According to reviewer Dan Pavlides, the film "ultimately fails to live up to its title." Fellow reviewer Fred Beldin regards Terror as "one of [Warren's] more watchable films [...] trotting out a laundry list of haunted house/slasher/witchcraft clichés delivered with crisp British flair and enough gore overkill to satisfy the bloodthirsty." He criticises the "half-hearted whodunit" theme but commends the murder scenes, calling them "cheap but nastily effective". According to Ian Jane of DVD Talk, Terror "works well if you approach it expecting nothing more than a fun ninety minutes of trashy horror [...] there's enough carnage and slickly shot mayhem in here to ensure that even if the characters are rather shallow and the premise a little hokey, the film is never dull." Paul Mavis, also of DVD Talk, views Terror as an awkward mixture of "Hammer Gothic" and "New Wave" elements, concluding that it "comes out neither particularly good Hammer, nor completely urban, cold, nasty giallo". Bill Gibron writes that there are "elements that keep dragging the film down, making it play out longer and more languid than it should." He adds that the story is complicated by several plot holes. Seattle newspaper The Stranger describes the film as "a bloody and weirdly sexy hidden gem".

Ian Fryer, author of The British Horror Film: From the Silent to the Multiplex, considers the use of film studio settings significant as they allowed Warren and McGillivray "some fun at the expense of the sex and horror exploitation film sector both were more than familiar with." Harvey Fenton, editor of Flesh and Blood magazine, writes that the film contains "moments [...] which almost seem to be homages to the world of exploitation movie production in general." He compares the tension of the Bathtime with Brenda scenes to Warren's memories of making his first feature film, Her Private Hell (1968). Steve Green, also writing for Flesh and Blood, states that one of Terror's enduring aspects is the "joy [McGillivray's] script takes in spoofing the industry itself."

==== Comparison to other films ====
Ian Cooper, author of Frightmares: A History of British Horror Cinema, considers Terror to be Warren's best film but also his most derivative, noting the influence of Suspiria. He adds that Warren replaces Argento's "Gothic fairytale setting" of southern Germany with the "much less romantic" Barnes in London. Comparing Terror to Argento's work, Adam Locks observes that both Warren and Argento favour the "spectacle of violence and death" over narrative coherence. In Terror, the latter is undermined by the editing of scenes such as Ann's arrival at a railway station and her subsequent walk through a park: according to Locks, the sudden jump from one location to the other causes the narrative to "proceed quickly and disjointedly, as in a dream." He considers this effect a "classic Argento moment".

Kim Newman argues that while the film contains "Argentoisms" such as the bizarre death of Philip, other scenes, like the false stalking of Suzy, are "hoary clichés". Nigel Burrell of Flesh and Blood views the sequence with the mechanic as a low point, calling it "protracted and silly". Fenton argues that the influence of other films is also evident, believing the woodland chase before Carol's murder to be inspired by The Texas Chain Saw Massacre (1974). He compares Philip's decapitation to a similar scene in Argento's later film Inferno, suggesting that this was a case of Argento being inspired by Warren.

Warren himself admitted to being heavily influenced by others' work. According to Mark Fraser of website Top 10 Films: "Terror's storyline was initially concocted by Les and Moira Young, its plot's logistics essentially originated from a 'grand list' of all the scenes [Warren] wanted to lift from other horror works. This was then passed on to screen writer David McGillivray, whose unenviable brief was to cobble something together, incorporating all of these plagiarised ideas, into a coherent narrative."

=== Home media ===
Terror was released on DVD in 2004 by Anchor Bay Entertainment as part of the "Norman Warren Collection" DVD box set, which also includes Satan's Slave, Prey and Inseminoid. In 2006, the film was released as a double feature DVD by BCI Home Video, paired with Land of the Minotaur. It is also included on a 2019 limited-edition Blu-ray box set from Powerhouse Films titled "Bloody Terror: The Shocking Cinema of Norman J. Warren, 1976–1987".

== Unmade sequel ==
Warren said that following the release of Bloody New Year in 1987 he began planning a "sort of sequel to Terror: a fast-moving film that, along with the horror, also involves music and dancers." The proposed title was "Beyond Terror". Although Warren wrote a script, his attempts to secure funding failed and the film never entered production.
