= Prey (1977 film) =

- Theatrical release artwork from a double feature poster for Prey and Charley One-Eye
- Directed by: Norman J. Warren
- Screenplay by: Max Cuff
- Story by: Quinn Donoghue
- Produced by: Terence Marcel; David Wimbury
- Starring: Barry Stokes; Sally Faulkner; Glory Annen
- Cinematography: Derek V. Browne
- Edited by: Alan Jones
- Music by: Ivor Slaney
- Production company: Tymar Film Productions
- Distributed by: Premier Releasing
- Release date: November 1977
- Running time: 85 minutes
- Country: United Kingdom
- Language: English
- Budget: £50,000 (estimated)

Prey (titled Alien Prey in some markets) is a 1977 British science fiction horror film produced by Terry Marcel and directed by Norman J. Warren. The plot concerns a carnivorous alien (Barry Stokes) landing on Earth and befriending a lesbian couple (Sally Faulkner and Glory Annen) as part of his mission to evaluate humans as a source of food. It was filmed in ten days on a budget of about £50,000 (roughly £300,000 in 2025) using locations near Shepperton Studios in Surrey. It had a limited distribution on release.

Critical response to the film has been mixed: verdicts range from "odd", "bizarre" or "eccentric" to "ambitious" and "experimental", while the film's "claustrophobic" atmosphere has drawn both praise and criticism. Prey has also received comment for its presentation of conflicting male and female sexuality, with some critics noting similarities to the plot of the D. H. Lawrence novella The Fox (1922). It has been compared to a vampire or zombie film and has been cited as an example of the exploitation (or sexploitation) genre. Plans for a sequel, Human Prey, were abandoned.

== Plot ==
A carnivorous shape-shifting alien named Kator lands in the woods of rural England. The vanguard of an invasion force, his mission is to evaluate the suitability of humans as a source of food for his species. He kills Anderson and Sandy, a couple having a tryst in their parked car, and assumes the appearance of Anderson. Later, he encounters Jessica-Ann and Josephine, a lesbian couple who live in a manor house. Although Jessica owns the property, having inherited it from her Canadian parents, the dominant of the pair is Jo, who is unusually possessive of Jessica and suspicious of men. Simon, Jessica's boyfriend, has mysteriously disappeared. The women are vegetarians and live in seclusion with only some chickens and a pet parrot, Wally, for company.

Calling himself Anders, and feigning an injured leg, Kator is taken in by Jessica and Jo. His arrival immediately causes friction between the two women. Bored of her monotonous existence, Jessica welcomes the stranger's presence, but Jo is openly resentful and suggests that the socially-awkward Anders is an escapee from a psychiatric hospital (which she is herself). Returning to the spot where he killed Anderson and Sandy, Kator kills and partly devours two policemen who are examining the couple's abandoned car. At the house, Jessica finds a knife and bloodstained clothes in a spare bedroom. Recognising Simon's clothes, she realises that he was murdered by Jo.

The next morning, Jo is furious to find all the chickens slaughtered. Blaming a local fox, she lays traps for the animal and goes after it with a rifle, assisted by Jessica and Kator. When the hunt fails, Kator tracks and kills the fox on his own and presents it to Jessica and Jo as a trophy. The trio celebrate with a champagne party for which Jo dresses Kator in drag. A subsequent game of hide-and-seek brings out more of the hunter in Kator. Later, Jo is disturbed to find the fox carcass stripped bare and realises that the animal was not caught in a trap as she and Jessica thought. Jessica angrily rejects her warnings about Anders, interpreting Jo's fear as jealousy and revealing that she knows the truth about Simon.

The next morning, Jo arms herself with her knife and stalks Kator as he hunts swans on a nearby river. Her murder attempt is thwarted when Jessica calls for her from the house. Kator wades into the river and starts to drown, alerting Jessica with his screams. Jessica and Jo rescue him and take him back to the house. While the women clean themselves up, Kator consumes Wally. Jessica tells Jo that she will no longer be controlled and is leaving with Anders. Outraged, Jo knocks her unconscious and runs into the woods to dig a grave for her. On waking, Jessica seduces Kator. As they start to have sex, Kator's predatory instincts are stirred, causing him to revert to his natural form and tear open Jessica's throat, killing her. Having returned to the house, Jo attempts to flee but falls into the open grave just as Kator catches up with her. She screams as the scene fades to black.

Some time later, Kator leaves the house and calls his mother ship on an alien transceiver. Hungrily watching two girls walking along the river, he advises his superiors to dispatch more of his kind to Earth.

== Cast ==
- Barry Stokes as Kator and Anderson
- Sally Faulkner as Josephine
- Glory Annen as Jessica-Ann
- Sandy Chinney as Sandy
- Eddie Stacey as 1st Policeman
- Gerry Crampton (credited as Jerry Crampton) as 2nd Policeman
- Kelly Marcel and Rosie Marcel as the girls (uncredited)
- Derek Kavanagh as Radio DJ (voice only; uncredited)

== Themes ==
According to Jim Reed of the Psychotronic Film Society of Savannah, Georgia, Prey "finds unexpected vantage points for subtle commentary on the themes of sexism, love, adultery, betrayal and racism – all within the context of a gay-alien-zombie-vampire gore-fest". Critic Steve Chibnall describes the film as a "dark Darwinian fable" that, while "eccentric and sometimes unintentionally humorous [...] offers a serious discourse on the predatory nature of masculinity." Leon Hunt, author of British Low Culture: from Safari Suits to Sexploitation, further analyses the conflict of gender roles and sexualities in Prey. He argues that through the character of Jo, Prey establishes itself as one of a number of 1970s British horror films in which country houses are depicted as places of "dangerous female sexuality – bisexual or lesbian, unstable or jealous, murderous and castrating". In this respect, he considers the film misogynistic. Jo's sexuality is rivalled by Kator's "carnivorous masculinity" – which, as shown during Jessica's death scene, "grows out of the 'natural' sexual play between hunter and prey". Hunt observes that Kator, though a predator, is not invulnerable in this hostile world of femininity: his near-drowning could be seen as a "threatening immersion in the feminine". Noting that Jessica and Jo, as vegetarians, are essentially herbivores who both fall victim to Kator, Hunt describes Prey as a "competing carnivore movie" whose ultimate aim is "gender restoration" at any cost.

For Jeremy Heilman of the Online Film Critics Society, Kator serves as a "blunt metaphor for the threat that male figures pose to lesbian relationships". The film has been compared by both Hunt and critic Ian Cooper to D. H. Lawrence's 1922 novella The Fox, a story of metaphorical predation in which the implied lesbian relationship between two women, Banford and March, is disrupted by the unexpected arrival of a soldier called Henry. According to Hunt, plot elements shared by the two works include the "enclosed world" of the women's chicken farm and the way in which their lifestyle of "homoerotic seclusion" comes under threat, not only from a fox that slaughters their poultry but also from the handsome male stranger whose presence finally leads one of the women into "heterosexual temptation". Cooper suggests that the film also pastiches José Ramón Larraz's film Vampyres (1974).

Adam Locks argues that Prey evokes a "mythic English past" through its characterisation, setting, cinematography and music; these aspects serve to de-emphasise the importance of modern technology and collectively represent a "disavowal of the modern". He believes that the film conveys a strong sense of isolation, noting that the lesbian characters of Jessica and Jo are social outcasts and their rural home represents "a breakaway from the modern industrial world". According to Locks, the slow-motion drowning scene, which is accompanied by a "dark and brooding" combination of synthesiser and piano, symbolises a "deep anxiety over technological and economic expansion since the 1960s" and constitutes a "hysterical reaction to the intrusiveness of modern cultural change". More broadly, Locks identifies Prey as an example of an English surrealist tradition started by Lewis Carroll's 1865 novel Alice's Adventures in Wonderland and sustained by works such as the TV series The Avengers – which, like Prey, is set in a "mythic" England that bears little relation to the real world.

== Production ==
They told me an outline of the story – 'it's about an alien that comes to Earth in search of a food source and encounters a lesbian couple, and discovers humans are high in protein and easy prey'. Then they said, 'you have got to start in three weeks' time and it has to be finished in ten days. Also, we don't have a script at the moment'. And we all still said yes!

— Norman J. Warren

The story was conceived by producers Terry Marcel and David Wimbury and developed by Quinn Donoghue. At the beginning of May 1977, Marcel pitched it to Warren, who was fascinated by the idea and quickly agreed to direct. Warren described the film as his "most hectic" production but also "a lot of fun". Max Cuff, a journalist in his twenties, was hired to write a script based on Marcel and Wimbury's outline. Prey was made on a budget of approximately £50,000 in deferred payments and £3,000 cash.

Warren agreed to shoot the film in ten days starting on 23 May, giving him just three weeks for pre-production. He remembers that during this time "everyone was working flat out – there wasn't any sitting around waiting." The cast were supplied by a single talent agency, which also invested in the film: CCA Management, founded by Howard Pays. Prey was the film debut of Glory Annen, who had graduated from drama school the year before. She and Barry Stokes later appeared in Outer Touch (1979), also directed by Warren. Not all of the cast were professional actors: Sandy Chinney was the girlfriend of the second assistant director, while the two girls who appear in the final scene were played by Marcel's daughters, Kelly and Rosie. Due to budget constraints, some of the cast, including Annen, supplied their own costumes.

=== Filming ===
Marcel provided Warren with a filming slot on the wooded backlot of Shepperton Studios, located on the River Ash. Several scenes feature a bridge that had previously appeared in Dr. Terror's House of Horrors (1965). In addition, production designer Hayden Pearce secured the use of the manor house in Littleton Park (the studios' original site) to serve as the filming location for Jessica and Jo's home. Warren said of the filming arrangements: "This really was quite a unique situation because ... here we were in a studio looking at a real house and real rooms as if shooting on location." The crew were permitted to redecorate the rooms as necessary and, to this end, make use of any of the items in the studios' prop store. Warren states that this resulted in a "crazy" mixture of decors that "certainly helped create the right atmosphere" for the film.

Filming began after only half a day's rehearsal and without a finished script; the actors received new lines each day. According to Warren, "dear old Max Cuff was trying to keep up with us. He was writing like mad." Certain scenes were partly or wholly improvised: one example is a sex scene between the characters of Jessica and Jo, which was added mainly to boost the film's overseas distribution prospects. Many of the crew had recently finished work on The Pink Panther Strikes Again, on which Marcel had been assistant director. They completed an average of 35 camera set-ups per day, employing hand-held shots whenever they fell behind schedule and filming scenes in no more than three takes to keep costs down. Stokes, who wore contact lenses as part of his alien make-up, needed regular injections to ease the discomfort in his eyes. "Wally" was a cockatoo that often failed to perform when needed and squawked loudly off-camera, causing problems with the sound recording. He eventually escaped from his birdcage and was never seen again.

The outdoor shooting was aided by the weather, which was sunny and warm throughout. This inspired Warren to direct the film in a "leisurely" manner while maintaining an "underlying sense of tension and uncertainty" to create a more shocking finale. Warren considered the premise of the film to be "intimate" and situation-driven, arguing that the light script and small cast allowed the characters to develop naturally as the shooting progressed. Stuntmen Gerry Crampton and Eddie Stacey filmed their scenes in about two hours.

The scene in which Jessica and Jo save Kator from drowning in the river was one of the first to be shot and presented difficulties for the crew. For years, the Ash had been used as a waste dump, causing the water to stagnate; according to Warren it looked "more like crude oil". Moreover, Annen was unable to swim. To minimise the amount of time the actors would have to spend in the water, Warren filmed the scene in slow motion on a high-speed camera, reducing the amount of footage that needed to be shot. After filming the scene, the actors were given precautionary tetanus injections. Marcel was highly impressed with the footage and insisted that Alan Jones, the film's editor, leave the scene uncut despite Warren's concerns that it was too long. Filming ended on 3 June with the scene of Anderson and Sandy's deaths; as the final filming day had run into the early hours of the following morning, this was shot night-for-night.

=== Post-production ===
As the low budget precluded hiring an orchestra, the film's composer, Ivor Slaney, devised a mostly synthesised score. It featured interjections by traditional instruments which were played by Slaney himself, including a piano. Slaney also composed for Warren's next film, Terror (1978). The soundtracks for Prey and Terror were released jointly on CD in 2009.

To reduce costs, no alien spacecraft is seen at the start of the film; instead, Kator's arrival is conveyed solely by flashing lights and sound effects.

== Release and reception ==
The film was distributed by Supreme in the UK. Cuts to Kator's killing of Jessica were required for the film to secure an X certificate, which the British Board of Film Censors granted on 2 November 1977. In London, Prey was screened alongside the 1973 Western Charley One-Eye as half of a double feature. It was re-rated 18 prior to its first home video release in 1986.

=== Critical response ===
In a contemporary review, Tom Milne of the Monthly Film Bulletin suggested that the film's "pleasantly outrageous" theme "would have been more appealing treated with the sense of humour loudly called for by its most promising notions". However, he also observed the "attractive settings and photography" and "very creditable performances" of the lead actors. Over the years, reactions to the film have remained mixed. Kim Newman, writing for Video Watchdog in 2005, describes Prey as the "most minimal of Warren's exploitation films, and among the strangest British movies of all time", arguing that it plays like "a reverse spoof; the material could have been absurd and comical, with a succession of very dark jokes, but the treatment (especially the performances) is serious to the point of solemnity."

In a 2009 review on moviemartyr.com, Jeremy Heilman praises the film, describing it as a "solid B movie effort", "slyly humorous" and "disturbing". He argues that – partly by necessity, due to its low budget – Prey is more "character-driven" than most other science fiction horror films, and praises the sustained tension and "distinctive" dynamics of the plot. His one major criticism is the cinematography and editing, which he considers "less than expertly done"; the drowning scene, for example, is prolonged "to the point of unintentional hilarity". Newman and James Marriott, authors of Horror! The Definitive Companion to the Most Terrifying Movies Ever Made, view this sequence as one of several "incomprehensible stylistic flourishes", while Kevin Lyons of the British Film Institute calls it "excruciating". Lyons is complimentary of Prey as whole, judging it a "nicely claustrophobic melodrama" and one of several "overlooked" British science fiction horrors of the 1970s.

Cooper describes Prey as a "defiantly odd low-fi sci-fi film". Writing for the Savannah Morning News, Reed gives a mostly positive assessment: he describes the film as "flawed" yet "ambitious and somewhat mesmerising", as well as "experimental". Peter Hutchings considers the film "bizarre" but adds that the "sustained seriousness" of Warren's direction and the "doom-filled atmosphere" save Prey from becoming a "piece of camp nonsense". Fred Beldin of AllMovie is critical, summing up Prey as a "dismal, unsettling film" with "occasional arthouse pretensions" that is "difficult to watch even for exploitation fans". He describes the film as having unrelenting tension and "claustrophobia", commenting: "deaths seem like appropriate punctuation at the end of a miserable sentence, giving the film a grim tone of hopelessness that few will derive pleasure from". He calls Faulkner's performance "particularly grating". By contrast, Newman and Marriott praise the "surprisingly good turns" from Stokes, Annen and Faulkner.

== Abandoned sequel ==
Shortly after the film's release, Marcel and Warren began work on a sequel – provisionally titled Human Prey – with writer Quentin Christopher. According to Warren, this would have opened with Kator meeting more potential victims in a pub before the aliens arrive en masse to "farm humans like cattle". Marcel compared the plot to that of Starship Troopers. The idea was abandoned due to the limited distribution of the original.

== See also ==
- List of British films of 1977
- List of horror films of 1977
- List of LGBT-related films of 1977
- Media portrayal of lesbians
- Media portrayals of bisexuality
- List of films featuring extraterrestrials
- List of films featuring domestic violence
- List of monster movies
