= Tony Maiden =

English actor (1949–2004)

- Tony Maiden playing Albert Clifton with Judi Bowker playing Vicky Gordon in the episode "Wild Justice" in the series The Adventures of Black Beauty (1972–1974).
- Born: Tony Maiden
- Died: 17 February 2004; Torrevieja, Alicante, Spain
- Years active: ?–2004

Tony Maiden (died 17 February 2004 in Torrevieja, Alicante, Spain) was an English actor, who is best known for playing "Albert Clifton" in the British television series The Adventures of Black Beauty (1972–1974).

He is also known for playing "Willy" in the soft-core pornographic comedy film Outer Touch (1979), known in the U.S. as Spaced Out. The New York Times described the character as "a pimply young Cockney innocent for whom all the Betelgeusians fall...engagingly portrayed by Tony Maiden".

Other roles included Assistant Boots "E.J. Guy" in S.O.S. Titanic (1979). He also appeared in Keep it in the Family as "Val" (1971).

On 17 February 2004, he died in Spain.
