= Lucia Modugno =

Italian actress and writer (1932–2026)

- Modugno in 1970
- Born: 9 July 1932; Bari, Italy
- Died: 2 November 2026 (aged 94); Rome, Italy
- Occupations: Actress; writer
- Years active: 1959–2023

Lucia Modugno (9 July 1932 – 2 November 2026) was an Italian actress and writer.

Modugno was initially a film actress, notably appearing in Her Private Hell before switching to the theatre in the 1980s.

Modugno died in Rome on 2 November 2026, at the age of 94.

== Filmography ==
- General Della Rovere (1959)
- Urlatori alla sbarra (1960)
- Ursus in the Valley of the Lions (1962)
- The Girl Who Knew Too Much (1963)
- I mostri (1963)
- Gli imbroglioni (1963)
- The Sultans (1966)
- Navajo Joe (1966)
- My Name Is Pecos (1966)
- For a Few Dollars Less (1966)
- Per amore... per magia... (1967)
- Danger: Diabolik (1968)
- Her Private Hell (1968)
- Ms. Stiletto (1969)
- Le notti peccaminose di Pietro l'Aretino (1972)
- Pasqualino Cammarata, Frigate Captain (1974)
- Novelle licenziose di vergini vogliose (1973)
- What a Beautiful Day (2011)

== Publications ==
- Vengo a prendere il «caffè» da te (2005)
- Dietro le quinte. Dallo schermo al palcoscenico. Confidenze (in)confessabili (2009)
- Affollatissima Solitudine (2015)
- Sonata a quattro mani (2018)
- Pirandello, questo mio sconosciuto - Antonietta Pirandello nata Portolano (2023)
