= Patti Love =

British actress (1947–2023)

Patricia Margaret Love (18 August 1947 – 17 February 2023) was a Scottish actress.

On stage she was best known for playing the schizophrenic title role in the David Edgar play Mary Barnes at the Birmingham Repertory Theatre (1978) and London's Royal Court Theatre (1979), together with numerous credits for the Citizens Theatre in Glasgow, the Royal National Theatre and the Royal Shakespeare Company. She also appeared in such films as That'll Be the Day (1973), Terror (1978), The Long Good Friday (1980), Steaming (1985), The Krays (1990), An Awfully Big Adventure (1995) and Mrs Henderson Presents (2005).

== Early and personal life ==
Love was born to parents Henry Love and Margaret (née Cunningham) and grew up in Glasgow. Her father, who had been a prisoner of war in Japanese camp, died when she was young. Love trained at the Drama Centre London.

Love had a longterm relationship with English actor Bob Hoskins.

== Death ==
Love died from complications of dementia on 17 February 2023, at the age of 75. She had been living at Denville Hall, a retirement home for entertainers, since 2020.
