= Your Vision Was Never Mine to Share =

Studio album by Misery Loves Co.
- Released: March 2000
- Genre: Industrial metal
- Label: Earache Records

Misery Loves Co. chronology
Not Like Them (1997)	Your Vision Was Never Mine to Share (2000)	Zero (2019)

Professional ratings
Review scores
Source	Rating
Allmusic	4.5/5 stars
Kerrang!	4/5 stars

Your Vision Was Never Mine to Share is the third full-length studio album by Swedish industrial metal band Misery Loves Co..

== Track listing ==
No.	Title	Length
1.	"Your Vision Was Never Mine to Share"	4:20
2.	"No Exit"	5:02
3.	"On Top of the World"	4:05
4.	"Like a Suicide"	5:08
5.	"Rise and Fall"	4:53
6.	"Damage Driven"	5:26
7.	"Never Gonna Grow Up"	4:36
8.	"Into the Grey"	5:08
9.	"The Drowning Man" (The Cure cover)	5:19
10.	"When Everything Dies"	5:58
