= Mark Kingston =

British actor (1934–2011)

- Born: 18 April 1934; Deptford, London, England
- Died: 9 October 2011 (aged 77); Northwood, London, England
- Education: London Academy of Music and Dramatic Art
- Occupation: Actor
- Spouse: Marigold Kingston

Mark Kingston (18 April 1934 – 9 October 2011) was an English actor who made many television and stage appearances over his 50-year career.

== Biography ==
Kingston's father was a blacksmith and he attended Greenwich Central School and trained as an actor at LAMDA, he then appeared in repertory theatre and at the Old Vic with Vivien Leigh.

He played the lecturer Frank in the original stage production of Educating Rita with Julie Walters. On television he had significant roles in United!, Beryl's Lot, A Voyage Round My Father, Shine on Harvey Moon, and other productions. His film career included roles in Invasion (1965), Love Is a Splendid Illusion (1970), Hitler: The Last Ten Days (1973) as Martin Bormann, Saint Jack (1979), Lady Oscar (1979), Sphinx (1981) and Give My Regards to Broad Street (1984). Kingston also appeared in an episode of Birds of a Feather as Sharon's (Pauline Quirke) Lover (1990).

He died at Denville Hall retirement village in 2011.

== Partial film and TV roles ==
- Women Without Men (1956) – Operator (uncredited)
- Invasion (1966) – Private Morgan
- Love Is a Splendid Illusion (1970) – Bernard Collins
- Hitler: The Last Ten Days (1973) – Martin Bormann
- Lady Oscar (1979) – Général de Jarjayes
- Saint Jack (1979) – Yates
- Sphinx (1981) – Carter
- Give My Regards to Broad Street (1984) – Terry
- Intimate Contact (TV Series) (1987) – Bill Stanhope
- No Job for a Lady (1990-'92) – Geoff Price (18 episodes)
- The Case of the Missing Will (Poirot TV series) (1993) – Andrew Marsh
