= Misery Loves Co. =

Swedish industrial metal band

- Origin: Uppsala, Sweden
- Genres: Industrial metal
- Years active: 1993–2000, 2016–present
- Labels: Black Lodge
- Members: Patrik Wiren; Örjan Örnkloo; Michael Hahne

Misery Loves Co. is a Swedish industrial metal duo, initially active in the 1990s and early 2000s and again since 2016. The band combine the hostility of thrash metal riffs with electronic samples usually associated with industrial music. Their lyrics generally focus on bleak sexual visions and pain over troubled relationships.

== History ==
The band was formed in January 1993 by Patrik Wiren (vocals) and Örjan Örnkloo (guitar, bass, programming). Wiren was previously a member of Midas Touch who had recorded an album with Noise Records, while Örnkloo worked with several bands within his Swedish hometown, Uppsala. Their first recorded track was Sonic Attack for a metal compilation Extreme Close Up. Based on the response to the single the band worked with MNW Zone to release their self-titled debut album, Misery Loves Co., in 1995. Independent success lead to signing with Earache Records which re-released the album throughout Europe.

During live performances, Misery added Jim Edwards (guitar), Marre Ericksson (bass), and Olle Dahlstedt (drums), who was replaced by Niklas Gabrielsson before their first UK show, at the Camden Underworld. The band opened for Clawfinger and then for Warrior Soul, Headswim, and Clawfinger later in the year.

Misery's US debut disc featured a promotional CD with the track Need Another One remixed by similar bands such as Killing Joke and Pitchshifter. In 1996, the band returned with an EP, Happy?, which featured seven tracks and a collection of multimedia bonuses. The band toured with Slayer and Fear Factory before their second album, Not like Them, was released in 1997. The record reached number 12 on Kerrang! 's Top 20 in 1997. Misery then toured Europe, supporting Machine Head. Their last and softer album, Your Vision Was Never Mine to Share, was released in March 2000. Another European tour followed, with Kill II This and earthtone9, but in late 2000 Misery Loves Co. announced their splitting.

Patrik Wiren went on to form the band Alpha Safari (formerly named Washoe) with some former live members from Misery Loves Co. They have released one album titled Commercial Suicide.

In February 2016, the band reformed. On 2 June 2017, a teaser video was released by the band on YouTube, where Wiren talks about a new single called Would You?. In the same video Wiren say that Misery Loves Co. have been writing new music since 2005 and want to start touring and release more music in the future. Would You? was released as a single on all digital platforms in 2017. In 2018 two digital singles followed, the first was Suburban Breakdown and the second was a cover of Garbage's Only Happy When It Rains. In 2019 they released another single titled Way Back Home (Single Edit), then later on in 2019, the band released their fourth album, Zero.

== Members ==
- Patrik Wiren – vocals
- Örjan Örnkloo – guitars, programming
- Michael Hahne – guitars, bass

== Discography ==
=== Studio albums ===
- Misery Loves Co. (1995)
- Not Like Them (1997)
- Your Vision Was Never Mine to Share (2000)
- Zero (2019)

=== Singles and EPs ===
- Private Hell (1994)
- Need Another One (1995)
- Kiss Your Boots (1995)
- Happy? (1996)
- Prove Me Wrong (1997)
- Blinded (1998)
- Would You? (2017)
- Suburban Breakdown (2018)
- Only Happy When It Rains (2018)
- Way Back Home (Single Edit) (2019)
