= Moris Farhi =

London-based Turkish author (1935–2019)

Moris Farhi MBE, FRSL
- Born: Musa Moris Farhi; 5 July 1935; Ankara, Turkey
- Died: 5 March 2019 (aged 83); England
- Education: Robert Academy; Royal Academy of Dramatic Art
- Occupation: Author
- Notable work: Children of the Rainbow (1999); Young Turk (2004)
- Relatives: Nicole Farhi (cousin)

Musa Moris Farhi MBE, FRSL (5 July 1935 – 5 March 2019) was a Turkish author who was vice-president of International PEN from 2001 until his death in 2019.

== Profile ==
Farhi was born to a Sephardic Jewish family in Ankara, Turkey, in 1935. He received a B.A. in humanities from Robert Academy, Istanbul, in 1954. He came to the UK in the same year and trained at the Royal Academy of Dramatic Art, graduating in 1956 and settling in London. After a brief career as an actor, he took up writing.

He wrote several novels, including Children of the Rainbow (1999) and Journey through the Wilderness (1989). Children of the Rainbow received two prizes: the "Amico Rom" from the Associazione Them Romano of Italy (2002), and the "Special" prize from the Roma Academy of Culture and Sciences in Germany (2003). The French edition of Young Turk (Jeunes Turcs) received the 2007 Alberto Benveniste Prize for Literature. His poems have appeared in many British, US and European publications and in the anthology of 20th-century Jewish poets, Voices Within the Ark (Avon, US, 1979). He also published short stories in anthologies and magazines in the UK, the US and Poland. He wrote many television scripts such as The Onedin Line 1972 episode "Beyond the Upper Sea"; a film, The Primitives; and a stage play, From The Ashes of Thebes.

Farhi's essay, "The Courage To Forget", appeared in Index on Censorship (Vol. 24, No. 2, 2005). "God Save Us From Religion" is included in the collection Free Expression is No Offence (edited by Lisa Appignanesi, published by Penguin Books, 2005). "All History is the History of Migration", given at the "Know Your Place?" Conference in November 2005, was also published by Index on Censorship in 2006. Farhi's works have been translated into Arabic, Dutch, French, Galician, German, Greek, Hebrew, Italian, Polish, Romanian and Turkish.

He donated part of his personal library, consisting of more than 19,000 books, to Boğaziçi University.

For more than 25 years Farhi campaigned, from the ranks of English PEN Writers in Prison Committee (WiPC), for writers persecuted and/or imprisoned by repressive regimes. Between 1994 and 1997, he served as Chair of the English WiPC; and between 1997 and 2000, as Chair of International PEN's Writers in Prison Committee. In November 2001, he was elected a vice-president of International PEN. He was appointed as a Member of the Order of the British Empire (MBE) on 16 June 2001 in the Queen's Birthday Honours List, for services to literature. He was a Fellow of both The Royal Society of Literature (elected in 2001) and of The Royal Geographical Society.

Farhi also briefly worked on the BBC's science fiction series Doctor Who during its early stages of production in 1963. He drafted scripts for the serial "Farewell, Great Macedon" and the stand-alone episode "The Fragile Yellow Arc of Fragrance", neither of which ultimately entered production. Audio adaptations of these scripts would later appear in 2010 as The First Doctor Boxset as part of the Doctor Who: The Lost Stories line released by Big Finish Productions.

== Personal life ==
Farhi was first married to Monique Hassid, and they divorced amicably after 12 years. In 1978, he married psychoanalytic psychotherapist Nina Sievers (née Gould; 1943–2009), and has a stepdaughter, Rachel Sievers, a speech therapist. He was related to the late prominent businessman Üzeyir Garih and was the cousin of fashion designer Nicole Farhi.

His death in March 2019 was reported in The Bookseller.

== Filmography (as actor) ==
- The Flesh and the Fiends (1960) – stallholder (uncredited)
- From Russia with Love (1963) – gypsy (uncredited)
- You Only Live Twice (1967) – control room technician (uncredited)

== Novels ==
- The Pleasure of Your Death (Constable, 1972)
- The Last of Days (Bodley Head & Crown, US, 1983)
- Journey Through the Wilderness (Macmillan/Picador, 1989)
- Children of the Rainbow (Saqi, 1999)
- Young Turk (Saqi, 2004)
- A Designated Man (Telegram Books, 2009)
- Songs From Two Continents Poems (Saqi 2011)
