= Rio Fanning =

Northern Irish actor and writer (1931–2018)

- Born: James Arnold Rio Fanning; 7 November 1931; Newry, County Down, Northern Ireland
- Died: 12 August 2018 (aged 86); Towcester, Northamptonshire, England
- Years active: 1954–2014
- Spouse(s): Alexandra Knowles (m. 1969, divorced) (1 child) Karen Ford (m. 1988)
- Children: 2 sons (1 adopted)

Rio Fanning (7 November 1931 – 12 August 2018) was a Northern Irish actor and writer.

== Theatre ==
Raised in Tralee, he made his debut appearing in school plays and pageants produced by his father. As an adult, he trained at the London School of Dramatic Art.

Fanning began appearing in repertory theatre in late 1954 in Lancashire. Among these roles was playing Walter Darvel in Alan Melville's play Dear Charles at Royalty Theatre, Morecambe in February 1955. Later that year, he was invited by English actor/director Margery Mason to join her fledgling company, the Bangor New Theatre, becoming the founder-member. It was, at the time, the first professional company in Northern Ireland to be formed outside Belfast.

By the late 1950s, he had become a regular face in repertory. Some other theatre roles include:

- Appearing alongside Tom Bell in Arnold Ridley's Tabitha at the Grand Theatre, Swansea.
- Appearing with the Farnham Repertory Company at the 1959 Edinburgh Festival in The Devil's Plaything.
- Making his West End debut in September 1962 as Captain Brennan in Seán O'Casey's The Plough and the Stars, directed by Joss Ackland at the Mermaid Theatre.
- An ensemble part in the premiere of Joan Littlewood's World War I musical Oh, What a Lovely War! at the Theatre Royal Stratford East. (March 1963)
- Sharing the stage with Maximilian Schell (in his UK stage debut) as Steinbauer in the controversial John Osborne play A Patriot for Me at the Royal Court Theatre. (1965)

Together with Tony Doyle in 1970, they founded the Imperial Theatre Group, based in the Oval Theatre, Kennington, which was active for less than two years. In 1991, Fanning formed Threesome Productions with actresses Margi Clarke and Stella Fox.

He also directed stage plays for the theatre.

== Television ==
Fanning made his TV debut in a 1959 episode of Great Expectations and this was followed by roles in Dixon of Dock Green, Z-Cars, Ghost Squad, No Hiding Place, Softly, Softly, The Avengers, The Troubleshooters, The Champions, Budgie, Follyfoot, The Onedin Line, Warship, Hadleigh, Softly, Softly: Task Force, Within These Walls, Fall of Eagles, The Brothers, the Doctor Who classic Horror of Fang Rock, All Creatures Great and Small, Blake's 7, Emmerdale Farm, The Sandbaggers, The Gentle Touch, Juliet Bravo, Play for Today, Priest, Casualty, Peak Practice, The Bill, Father Ted (episode – Old Grey Whistle Theft) and Doctors among others. A regular part came in the form of Dr. O'Casey in The District Nurse.

== Writing ==
Under the pen name of Michael Robartes, Fanning wrote for a number of TV shows. These included six episodes of Emmerdale Farm in 1985 and two episodes of The District Nurse in 1987 (after he left his acting role in the show). During two stints, he wrote a total of 65 episodes of EastEnders, firstly between April 1985 and October 1989 and then from April 1992 to January 1995, as well as being storyline editor for 16 episodes between November 1990 and January 1991.

Using his real name, Fanning contributed episodes to Ballykissangel, The Legend of William Tell, The Adventures of Swiss Family Robinson, Peak Practice and Relic Hunter.

== Film ==
Fanning appeared in the 1961 film The Primitives as John Turner.

== Death ==
Late in life, Fanning was diagnosed with Alzheimer's disease, succumbing to the illness in 2018. On 2 October 2021, his wife, the actress Karen Ford, took part in a Memory Walk around Willen Lake in Milton Keynes in his honour, cutting the blue ribbon at the starting line and raising over £1200 for the cause.
