= Sam Bottoms =

American actor (1955–2008)

- Sam Bottoms in Apocalypse Now
- Born: Samuel John Bottoms; October 17, 1955; Santa Barbara, California, U.S.
- Died: December 16, 2008 (aged 53); Los Angeles, California, U.S.
- Occupations: Actor; film producer
- Years active: 1971–2007
- Spouses: Susan Arnold (m. 1980; div. 1987) Laura Bickford (m. 2002)
- Children: 2
- Relatives: Timothy Bottoms (brother); Joseph Bottoms (brother)

Samuel John Bottoms (October 17, 1955 – December 16, 2008) was an American actor and producer.

== Early life ==
Bottoms was born in Santa Barbara, California in 1955, the third son of James "Bud" Bottoms (a sculptor and art teacher) and Betty (Chapman), both of whom outlived him. He was the brother of actors Timothy Bottoms (born 1951), Joseph Bottoms (born 1954) and Ben Bottoms (born 1960).

== Career ==
When Bottoms was 16 years old, he was on the set of The Last Picture Show, in which his older brother Timothy starred, when the director Peter Bogdanovich decided to give him a screen test. He ended up in the movie as the character of Billy, who has no spoken lines but plays a pivotal role in the drama. Five years later, Bottoms appeared with Clint Eastwood in The Outlaw Josey Wales.

Bottoms may be best remembered for his role as surfer Lance B. Johnson, a Navy Gunner's Mate stationed on a river boat in Francis Ford Coppola's Apocalypse Now. Bottoms acquired hookworm during the chaotic production in the Philippines, and the parasite "wrecked his liver".

== Death ==
At age 53, Bottoms died of glioblastoma multiforme, a type of brain tumor, on December 16, 2008. He was cremated and his ashes given to his widow. He had two children.

== Filmography ==
=== Film ===
Year	Title	Role	Notes
1971	The Last Picture Show	Billy	
1973	Class of '44	Marty	
1974	Zandy's Bride	Mel Allan	
1976	The Outlaw Josey Wales	Jamie	
1979	Apocalypse Now	Lance B. Johnson	
1979	Up from the Depths	Greg Oliver	
1980	Bronco Billy	Leonard James	
1984	Gringo mojado	Murray Lewis Jr.	
1985	Prime Risk	Bill Yeoman	
1986	Hunter's Blood	David Rand	
1987	Gardens of Stone	Lt. Webber	
1988	After School	Father Michael McCarren	
1991	Hearts of Darkness: A Filmmaker's Apocalypse	Himself	Documentary
1991	Dolly Dearest	Elliot Wade	
1991	Ragin' Cajun	s Legs	
1992	North of Chiang Mai	Michael	
1993	Sugar Hill	Oliver Thompson	
1993	The Trust	James Baker	
1995	Project Shadowchaser III	Kody	
1997	Snide and Prejudice	Therapist Schaub	
1998	Joseph's Gift	Robert Keller	
2001	The Unsaid	Joseph Caffey	
2001	Shadow Fury	Mitchell Madsen	
2002	Looking Through Lillian	Gene	
2002	True Files	Alex Lomax	
2003	Seabiscuit	Mr. Blodget	
2005	Havoc	Lt. Maris	
2005	Shopgirl	Dan Buttersfield	
2005	Winter Passing	Brian	
2006	SherryBaby	Bob Swanson Sr.	
2007	Finishing the Game	Martey Kurtainbaum	Final film role

=== Television ===
- Doc Elliot (1974) as Gary Basquin
- Savages (1974) as Ben Campbell
- Lucas Tanner (1974) as Ron Gibbons
- Cage Without a Key (1975) as Buddy Goleta
- Marcus Welby, M.D. (1976) as Ed
- Greatest Heroes of the Bible (1978) as Joseph
- The Eddie Capra Mysteries (1978) as Harlan Fields
- East of Eden (1981) as Cal Trask
- Desperate Lives (1982) as Ken Baynes
- Return to Eden (1983)
- No Earthly Reason (1984) as Coley
- Island Sons (1987) as Sam Faraday
- The Witching of Ben Wagner (1987) as Mr. George 'Dad' Wagner
- Murder, She Wrote (1989–1991) as Joe Hellinger / Sgt. Joe Rice
- 21 Jump Street (1990) as Robert Johnson
- Zooman (1995) as Policeman
- The X Files (1995) as Michael Kryder
- My Neighbor's Daughter (1998) as Dennis Cromwell
- Mercenary II: Thick & Thin (1997) as Camera Man
- NYPD Blue (2004) as David Lewis

== Producer ==
- Picture This: The Times of Peter Bogdanovich in Archer City, Texas (1991)
