= Peter Hughes (actor) =

English actor (1922–2019)

- Born: Peter Clowe Hughes; 20 May 1922; Kensal Rise, London, England, UK
- Died: 5 February 2019 (aged 96); London, England, UK
- Occupations: Actor and director
- Years active: 1949–1999

Peter Clowe Hughes (London, England, 20 May 1922 – 5 February 2019) was an English actor with a career spanning five decades. He was an actor, founder and director of theatre, but was best known for his film and television roles.

== Early life and theatre ==
Hughes was born in Kensal Rise, London, an only child of a single mother. He was partly raised in foster institutions, and initially trained as a draughtsman designing car chassis, before moving to Coventry after his mother died in 1939 where he took a post designing armoured cars.

After helping establish the Talisman Theatre in 1942, he trained as an actor, making his professional debut in 1949, in a production of Noël Coward's Fallen Angels. His West End debut came four years later in 1953, after which he established a long association with both the Richmond Theatre and the Watford Palace Theatre.

== Film and television ==
In television, Hughes played the recurring role of a bank manager in the BBC series Bergerac.

Other notable roles include an English tourist in Love Is a Splendid Illusion (1970) and a harried golfer in the Last of the Summer Wine episode "Foggie's Niblick." He appeared in An Englishman's Castle in 1978, a serial of alternative history in which the Nazis have won the Second World War. Another appearance in 1978 was as the underworld crime boss William Henry (Bill) Hayden in an episode of the hard-hitting British police drama The Professionals, the episode entitled When the Heat Cools Off.

Hughes also featured as a maitre d' in The Great Muppet Caper (1981); the P&O manager in David Lean's A Passage to India (1984) and a policeman in the John Boorman film Hope and Glory (1987).

TV miniseries included Jack the Ripper (1988) starring Michael Caine in which Hughes played Mr. Poulson, the proprietor of a news agency. He played General Franco in Alan Parker's film adaptation of Evita in 1996.

== Personal life ==
Hughes and his wife Erica were the parents of cricketer and journalist Simon Hughes (born 1959) and historian and broadcaster Bettany Hughes (born 1967). He retired in 1999 and died in February 2019 at the age of 96.

== Filmography ==
Year	Title	Role	Notes
1962	The Primitives	Det. Inspector A.W. 'Bert' Wills	
1970	Love Is a Splendid Illusion	Maurice Howard	
1981	The Great Muppet Caper	Maitre D'	
1984	A Passage to India	P & O manager	
1987	Hope and Glory	Policeman	
1996	Evita	Francisco Franco	
