= Heather Wright =

English actress (born 1950)

- Born: 1950 (age 75–76); London

Heather Wright (born 1950) is an English actress, noted for her performances in film and television. Her film credits include Psychomania (1973), The Belstone Fox (1973), Shout at the Devil (1976) and Inseminoid (1981). On television, she has been seen in the following series: Arthur of the Britons, Survivors, Return of the Saint, Blake's 7, The Inheritors, Emmerdale, Holby City, Casualty, The Bill, Midsomer Murders and Broken. Wright is fluent in French, and has also had many acting parts on French TV.

== Partial filmography ==
- The Belstone Fox (1973) - Jenny Smith
- Psychomania (1973) - Girl with Parcel
- Shout at the Devil (1976) - Cynthia Smythe
- Inseminoid (1981) - Sharon
- Angus, Thongs and Perfect Snogging (2008) - Receptionist
- Coffee Sex You (2014) - Maria's Mother
