= The Belstone Fox =

1973 British film by James Hill

- Original British quad by Brian Bysouth
- Directed by: James Hill
- Written by: James Hill
- Based on: The Ballad of the Belstone Fox by David Rook
- Produced by: Sally Shuter; Basil Rayburn; Julian Wintle
- Starring: Eric Porter; Jeremy Kemp; Bill Travers; Rachel Roberts; Heather Wright; Dennis Waterman
- Cinematography: James Allen; John Wilcox
- Edited by: Peter Tanner
- Music by: Laurie Johnson
- Production company: Rank Organisation
- Distributed by: Fox-Rank (UK)
- Release date: 16 July 1973
- Running time: 88 minutes
- Country: United Kingdom
- Language: English
- Budget: £361,000
- Box office: £400,000

The Belstone Fox (also known as Free Spirit) is a 1973 British film directed by James Hill and starring Eric Porter, Jeremy Kemp and Bill Travers. It was written by Hill based on David Rook's 1970 novel, The Ballad of the Belstone Fox.

== Plot ==
The Belstone Fox is the nickname given to Tag, a fox cub rescued from the woods and adopted by huntsman Asher. The young fox is reared in captivity with a litter of hound puppies, including Merlin, with whom Tag becomes especially friendly. Asher and Tod are fascinated by Tag, who combines cool cunning and knowledge of human habitation to lead the pack and hunters in many a "merry chase." This gives the fox a status of local celebrity, enough to be published in magazines. Merlin, at first not interested in the hunts, becomes an active hound but protective of Tag. Asher, now an aging huntsman to the hunt club, is mildly protective of the fox until Tag leads the pack of hounds into the path of a train, killing many, and the club resolves to shoot the fox. Asher sees this as disturbing and against the natural order of life, and determines to bring down the fox in the approved manner, rather than with a firearm, however he dies from a sudden heart attack while attempting to do the deed. His once beloved fox and its friend Merlin sit beside their master until the rescue party comes.

== Cast ==
- Eric Porter as Asher
- Jeremy Kemp as Kendrick
- Bill Travers as Tod
- Rachel Roberts as Cathie
- Dennis Waterman as Stephen
- Heather Wright as Jenny

== Production ==
The Rank Organisation financed four films at the end of the 1974 financial year,Carry on Dick, Carry on Girls, The Belstone Fox and Don't Just Lie There, Say Something, and partly financed Soft Beds and Hard Battles and Caravan to Vaccares.

Filming started October 1972.

The Belstone Fox was mostly filmed in Somerset, on and near the Quantock Hills, with some additional filming on Dartmoor. The scene where Tag rests on a tomb in the church yard was filmed at the Church of St Peter and St Paul, Over Stowey, Somerset. Many of the extras were members of the West Somerset Vale Hunt.

The setting for the "Lawn Meet" at the Master's home was the nearby Barford Park. The scene where the hounds are led into the train tracks was filmed on a stretch of the West Somerset Railway, and was filmed in reverse and then played backward in order to get a realistic sense of the train colliding with the pack of hounds.

== Critical reception ==
The Monthly Film Bulletin wrote: "An unhappy example of how not to adapt a popular novel, with a badly constructed script relying on voice-overs for explanations that could easily be included in the action and raising issues and sub-plots that are never pursued. Characterisation is minimal (the actors coming a poor second to the attractively photographed animal 'stars'), and all the care and patience that has gone into the wild life photography is thrown away on an unconvincing plot. The hunting scenes have been played for sensation, with a 'blooding' ceremony and an improbable number of falls, all lovingly displayed in slow motion. Predictably, the film gets a lot of mileage out of being sentimentally anti-blood sports while blatantly exploiting their violence, and leaves very little to the imagination in the incident in which hounds are mown down by a train."

Time Out called the film "a dismayingly literal and unimaginative version of David Rook's novel." Filmink wrote "lovingly made, it's a little austere."

The Radio Times gave it two out of five stars, calling it a "workmanlike adaptation," adding, "Porter and Rachel Roberts acquit themselves adequately but the film ultimately impresses more for its wildlife photography than for its dramatic interest."

TV Guide gave the film three out of four stars, writing, "Porter is solid as the hunter who brings the baby fox to the hound for nurturing. Hats off to the trainers and technical experts who let the animals steal the show."

Britmovie described it as a "touching tale," adding, "Eric Porter as Asher and Rachel Roberts as his wife are first-rate."

"The film is worth watching for the animal photography ... Contains some violence to animals."

== Home media ==
The movie has been released a few times in PAL format, changing the film's running time from 103 minutes to 98 minutes. A Region 1 American DVD was released in 2013 as the 40th Anniversary Edition. It is merely reformatted from the PAL video, but at 98 minutes, still plays faster. At 103 minutes, the 2017 Blu-ray from Network UK is the correct film speed transfer but is Region B locked.

== Adaptations ==
There is a British edition of the novel entitled The Belstone Fox to tie in with the film. In this version, the hunter dies from pneumonia after collapsing of exhaustion rather than a heart attack, despite the best efforts of both the fox and the hound to keep him warm using their body heat.

An American edition of the tie-in novel carries the alternative title Free Spirit. In Free Spirit, the hunter gives up his quest for vengeance after the fox and the hound save the hunter's life by successfully insulating him.

== Relationship to the film The Fox and the Hound ==
The cover art for the 40th Anniversary Edition DVD includes the captions "The Original Timeless Tale of True Friendship" and "The Story that Inspired The Fox and the Hound", in reference to the 1981 Disney film.

Neil Sinyard wrote in The Best of Disney that the plot of this film and the 1981 Disney one have "a great deal in common".

Disney credited Daniel P. Mannix's 1967 novel, The Fox and the Hound, as the source material for their film.

In both David Rook's 1970 novel and James Hill's 1973 film, a red fox kit is reared by a hunter after his family is killed. The fox later returns to the wild and eludes a hunter and his hounds by running the rails just before a train is due. This results in an accident that motivates the hunter to track the fox for vengeance. In the Mannix novel, the hunter who raises the fox is different from the hunter who swears vengeance upon him. In the Rook novel, the hunter who takes in the fox is the same as the one who later swears vengeance. Also in the Rook novel, multiple hounds die in the train accident, while in Mannix's novel, only the hunter's favourite hound is killed. Another notable difference is that in the Mannix novel, the main hound who the hunter uses to track the offending fox has no prior relationship to that fox. In Rook's novel, this fox and hound are childhood friends.

== See also ==
- Foxes in popular culture, films and literature
- The Fox and the Hound, a 1967 novel by Daniel P. Mannix with similar themes
