= Elaine Ives-Cameron =

British-American actress (1938–2006)

- Ives-Cameron in Terror (1978)
- Born: Elaine Schleifer; 5 December 1938; Philadelphia, US
- Died: 15 November 2006 (aged 67); Lambeth, London, England
- Occupation: Actress

Elaine Ives-Cameron (5 December 1938–15 November 2006) was a British-American actress.

== Life and career ==
Elaine Ives-Cameron was born Elaine Schleifer, in Philadelphia, Pennsylvania to Betty (née Nisson) and Philip Schleifer, both of Russian-Jewish descent.

Ives-Cameron's film credits include The Night Digger, Terror, Murder by Decree and Supergirl.

Ives-Cameron's television appearances include Codename; Doctor Who, The Stones of Blood serial in the Key to Time story arc; Tales of the Unexpected; Miss Marple, as Hannah (the cook) in A Murder is Announced; Dempsey and Makepeace and The Bill.

In 2001, Ives-Cameron guest-starred in the Doctor Who audio adventure, The Stones of Venice.

== Personal life and death ==
Ives-Cameron had one son.

In 1994, Ives-Cameron wrote an article for The Independent newspaper about difficulties in the reclaiming of her house in the UK, which she had first let and was later occupied by squatters. The article provides a good example of the problems of eviction of squatters at that time and looks forward to the publication of the Criminal Justice and Public Order Act 1994. The Act contains provisions for the eviction of squatters within twenty-four hours.

Ives-Cameron died aged 67, in London, England, on 15 November 2006. She was buried in Roosevelt Memorial Park in Trevose, Pennsylvania, US.

== Filmography ==
| Year | Title | Role | Notes |
|---|---|---|---|
| 1966 | Illegal Abortion | | |
| 1971 | The Night Digger | Gypsy | |
| 1971 | Blue Blood | Serena | |
| 1976 | The Message | Arwa | |
| 1978 | Terror | Dolores Hamilton | |
| 1979 | Murder by Decree | Ellen | |
| 1980 | Phoelix | Mrs. Meyrick | |
| 1981 | Ragtime | Lawyer's Female Companion No. 2 | |
| 1982 | The Sender | Patient #4 | |
| 1984 | Supergirl | Party Guest #1 | |
| 1985 | Miss Marple: A Murder Is Announced | Hannah, the cook | |
| 1992 | Revenge of Billy the Kid | Rowan Morrison | |
| 2000 | Dead Babies | Giles' mother | |
