= The Primitives (film) =

1961 British film by Alfred Travers

- Cover of the film's press-book
- Directed by: Alfred Travers
- Screenplay by: Moris Farhi; Alfred Travers
- Produced by: Negus Fancey
- Starring: Jan Holden; Rio Fanning; Bill Edwards
- Edited by: Alfred Cox
- Production company: Border Film Productions
- Release date: 1961
- Running time: 70 minutes
- Country: United Kingdom
- Language: English

The Primitives is a 1961 British second feature ('B') film directed by Alfred Travers and starring Jan Holden, Rio Fanning and Bill Edwards. It was written by Moris Farhi and Travers.

A gang of jewel thieves disguise themselves as cabaret artistes.

== Plot ==
"The Primitives" – Peter, Claude, Philip and their female leader Cheta – are an international gang of jewel thieves posing as entertainers working at nightclubs. The police receive confusing reports since the thieves use various disguises during their crimes. When they steal diamonds from a London jeweller's shop Scotland Yard realises there may be a thespian angle, and starts investigating the acting community. In the gang's next robbery, while breaking into an apartment, its owner, journalist John Tanner, arrives unexpectedly to find Cheta, with whom he falls in love. Philip is jealous of Turner and plants a bomb in Turner's bag before he boards a plane. Cheta, Peter and Claude foil Philip's plot and save Turner.

== Cast ==
- Jan Holden as Cheta
- Rio Fanning as John Turner
- Bill Edwards as Peter
- George Mikell as Claude
- Terence Fallon as Detective Sergeant Henry
- Derek Ware as Philip
- Peter Hughes as Detective Inspector Wills
- George Roderick as jeweller
- John Barrard as Honeydew
- Tom Bowman as sergeant
- Carole Turner as receptionist
- John Junkin as Arthur
- Howard Green as porter
- Barry Jackson as messenger

== Music ==
The theme music was composed and performed by Edmundo Ros.

== Reception ==
The Monthly Film Bulletin wrote: "Presumably intended to show how the police inevitably track down their quarry, this curiously angled thriller instead demonstrates that only the sort of crook who is sufficiently unreliable to fall in love prevents crime from paying. Moreover, the idea that a dancing-girl and her male accompanists, dressed up in the simplest of disguises, can act their way out of anything, including subsequent recognition by those they have robbed, is more interesting than credible. Nevertheless a general air of geniality compensates for the script's lack of subtlety, and the direction is occasionally quite inventive."

Kine Weekly wrote: "The plot has some invention, the players are more than adequate, and the same goes for the staging, ranging from night club scenes to a bustling airport. In all, commendable 'curtain-raiser.' ... The picture is well off the mark, gets slightly bogged down halfway, but quickly recovers and stages a traditional, yet showmanlike, in-the-nick-of-time climax. ... There is a hint of romance between Cheta and John, but crime and its detection are its main ingredients. The dish, served against appropriate backgrounds, should satisfy the ninepennies."

In The Radio Times Guide to Films John Gammon gave the film 2/5 stars, writing: "The Primitives are four jewel thieves – three men led by one woman – posing as entertainers, who draw upon their skill with disguises in their nefarious schemes. Jan Holden is Cheta, well named as the female cat burglar of the team, who becomes an inconvenient love interest. When they rob a London jewellers, the British police spot the unusual thespian quality of the crime and get on their tails. All pretty incredible, yet watchable."

Chibnall and McFarlane in The British 'B' Bilm described the film as "surprisingly entertaining".

== Home media ==
The film was released on DVD as part of the collection Films with a Beat (Renown Films, 2016).
