= True Files (film) =

2002 Hong Kong-Singaporean film by John D. Lamond

- Directed by: John D. Lamond
- Written by: John D. Lamond
- Starring: Sam Bottoms; Lim Kay Tong; Leah Di Stasio; Glory Annen
- Release date: 2002
- Running time: 98 minutes
- Countries: Hong Kong; Singapore
- Language: English

True Files (also known as Shanghai Lilly) is a 2002 film directed by John D. Lamond and starring Sam Bottoms, Lim Kay Tong, Leah Di Stasio, and Glory Annen.

The film was shot in 1997 in a backlot in Singapore. The film languished in legal limbo for a time after one of the financiers suffered a stroke but Lamond managed to sell it to 10 territories, mostly in Asia.

== Plot ==
In Asia, 1936, an American woman's husband is shot while sleeping with a prostitute.
