= Gerry Crampton =

British stuntman

- Born: Robert Gerald Crampton; 28 April 1930; Fulham, London, England
- Died: 24 January 2009 (aged 78); Surrey, England
- Occupation(s): Stunt performer, stunt coordinator, stunt double, actor
- Years active: 1955 – 2008

Gerry Crampton (28 April 1930 – 24 January 2009) was a British stunt performer and stunt coordinator best known for his work in the James Bond film series.

== Early life ==
The eldest of five children, Robert Gerald Crampton, was born in Fulham on 28 April 1930. His father, a keen amateur boxer, taught Gerry and his brothers to box. He also became a keen swimmer and taught himself to dive.

Gerry left school at the age of 14 to become a butcher's boy before returning to London in 1945, initially finding work at Ealing Studios as a sound assistant on David Lean's Great Expectations (1946). In 1948 Crampton was called up for his National Service and found himself working as a teletypist in the RAF.

After Gerry began bodybuilding, winning Britain's Mr Body Beautiful in 1956.

== Career ==
Crampton's big chance in films came when he met the James Bond stunt coordinator, Bob Simmons, in 1960, who took him under his wing.

In 1967 he appeared in The Avengers episode entitled "Dead Man's Treasure" in the role of 1st Guest.

Crampton had a special expertise working in India where he first worked on Tarzan Goes to India in 1962 with Jock Mahoney. He was to return to India 48 more times in his career, working on countless Indian as well as British productions.

== Personal life ==
Crampton married for the first time when he was 20, but the marriage lasted less than a year. He remarried three more times, each ending in divorce, but in later years he was always proud to say that he remained on friendly terms with three of his ex-wives.

== Filmography ==
Year	Title	Role	Notes				
1955	One Good Turn	Boxing Booth Assistant	Uncredited				
1961	Fury at Smugglers' Bay	Wrecker	Uncredited				
1962	Captain Clegg	Tattooed Sailor	Uncredited				
1962	The Road to Hong Kong	Astronaut	Uncredited				
1963	Sparrows Can't Sing	Pub Patron	Uncredited				
1966	Daleks – Invasion Earth: 2150 A.D.	Resistance Member	Uncredited				
1967	The Dirty Dozen	Staff Sergeant Alistair Clayton	Uncredited				
1968	Attack on the Iron Coast	Commando	Uncredited				
1968	Nobody Runs Forever	Rifleman	Uncredited				
1971	Puppet on a Chain	Thug	Uncredited				
1972	Death Line	Tunnel Worker					
1976	I'm Not Feeling Myself Tonight	Party Guest	Uncredited				
1976	Voyage of the Damned	Crewman	Uncredited	1980	Shaan	Henchman in climax	Uncredited
1981	Raiders of the Lost Ark	German Soldier	Uncredited				
1985	The Bride	Gentleman					
1988	Willow	Nockmaar Lieutenant	Uncredited				
1992	Blue Ice	Clubber	Uncredited				
1994	The Jungle Book	Sgt. Major					
