= Joyce Grant =

South African actress (1924–2006)

- Born: 23 January 1924; Bloemfontein, South Africa
- Died: 11 July 2006 (aged 82)
- Occupation: Actress
- Years active: 1924-2006

Joyce Grant (23 January 1924 – 11 July 2006) was a UK-based South African actress known for her comedic roles. Grant was born in Bloemfontein, South Africa, and her father encouraged her to move to London to study acting at the Central School of Speech and Drama. When she returned to South Africa, her roles included: "Lola" in William Inge's Come Back Little Sheba and as "Laura Wingfield" in Tennessee Williams' The Glass Menagerie. At the end of the 1950s she returned permanently to London and appeared in The Happy Apple, Something’s Afoot, The Club, Deathtrap and Tonight at Eight-thirty. On television she was in The Man in Room 17 and the episode of Gideon's Way "How to Retire without Really Working".

She appeared in the TV musical Pickwick for the BBC in 1969 and played opposite Frankie Howerd on Broadway in Rockefeller and the Red Indians. In 1980, she appeared in the first episode of Hi-de-Hi! playing the mother of Jeffrey Fairbrother. In 1987, Joyce became a member of The National Theatre Company, appearing in three productions, Ting Tang Mine, Fathers and Sons and Six Characters in Search of an Author. In 1988, she played Aunt Em/Glinda in the Royal Shakespeare Company's The Wizard of Oz and Mother Superior in Black Adder S1E3-The Archbishop.She was in the episode Spy Probe of 'The Professionals' television series.

== Retirement and legacy ==
After retiring from the stage she became a "buddy" to HIV+ patients at the Lighthouse in London and was featured in two of Lewis Morley's photographic portraits held by the National Portrait Gallery. Joyce Grant died on 11 July 2006, from cancer, aged 82.
