= Misery Loves Co. (album) =

Studio album by Misery Loves Co.
- Released: 1994 (Scandinavia); 1995 (rest of the world)
- Genre: Industrial metal
- Label: Classified Records

Misery Loves Co. chronology
Misery Loves Co. (1994)	Not Like Them (1997)

Professional ratings
Review scores
Source	Rating
Allmusic	link

Misery Loves Co. is the debut and self-titled album by Swedish industrial metal band Misery Loves Co. It was nominated for a Grammi at the Swedish Grammis awards in 1995 and was also listed as one of the 100 greatest rock albums of all times in Kerrang (1996). A music video was made for the opening track "My Mind Still Speaks" featuring a male teenager who, after suffering neglect and physical abuse, decides to run away from home; interspersed are shots of the band performing the song at a concert.

== Track listing ==
No.	Title	Length
1.	"My Mind Still Speaks"	4:16
2.	"Kiss Your Boots"	4:40
3.	"Need Another One"	4:35
4.	"Sonic Attack"	5:34
5.	"This is No Dream"	4:01
6.	"Happy?"	5.02
7.	"Scared"	2:02
8.	"I Swallow"	4:58
9.	"Private Hell"	5:00
10.	"The Only Way"	3:36
11.	"2 Seconds"	3:41
