= Love Is a Splendid Illusion =

1970 British film by Tom Clegg

Love is a Splendid Illusion
- Lobby card
- Directed by: Tom Clegg
- Starring: Simon Brent; Andrée Flamand; Lisa Collings; Peter Hughes; Mark Kingston; Fiona Curzon
- Music by: Wilfred Burns
- Release date: 1970
- Country: United Kingdom
- Language: English

Love is a Splendid Illusion, also known as Bed and Don't Tell, is a 1970 British sex comedy film directed by Tom Clegg and starring Simon Brent and Andrée Flamand. A businessman's cheating ways come to a head in Italy when the secret lover of his equally cheating wife turns out to be a potential business partner.

The project was originally offered to director Norman J. Warren, as the third of three sex films for London-based producer Bachoo Sen (the others being Her Private Hell and Loving Feeling), but Warren received little of the box office revenue and was concerned he might be typecast as a porn director.

== Plot ==
Designer Christian Dubarry travels to Italy to meet Bernard Collins, with whom he wants to do business. Christian takes his wife Amanda with him, unaware that Collins has been having an affair with her in London. Dubarry soon becomes interested in another woman, Michele Howard, staying at the same hotel. He is also attracted to high-class German call girl Sophie. When he discovers Amanda's affair with Collins, Dubarry breaks up with her, but finally they are reconciled.

== Cast ==
- Simon Brent as Christian Dubarry
- Andrée Flamand as Michele Howard
- Lisa Collings as Amanda Dubarry
- Peter Hughes as Maurice Howard
- Mark Kingston as Bernard Collins
- Fiona Curzon as Liz
- Maxine Casson as Debbie
- Anna Matisse as Sophie
- Carl Ferber as Jason
- Nancy Nevinson as Amanda's mother
- Gay Soper as blonde girl in red

== Critical reception ==
The Monthly Film Bulletin wrote: "Ingenuous sex drama. There is more to the plot than in most recent offerings on the same lines and the acting is adequate; but in all other respects it's the mixture as before, with the girls stripping at the slightest pretext and the protagonists making love to the visual accompaniment of thundering surf."

Kine Weekly wrote: "A somewhat trite but not unpleasing tale, this restricts its appeal by the inclusion of unnecessary nudity. ... This could have been a slightly better-than-ordinary exercise in romantic entanglements in the modern style, the virtues of marriage being fashionably disregarded, but the film makers have taken advantage of present-day permissiveness to spend much time on erotic wrestling and semi-nude women: time that detracts from rather than adds to the quite interesting self-inflicted dilemma of the story's anti-hero and slows the whole affair. The cast is entirely without well known star names, and though the acting does not suggest any discoveries, it is competent, and Simon Brent, as Christian, certainly has looks and wears clothes handsomely."

The South China Sunday Post-Herald wrote: "Love is a splendid illusion. Skin flicks are a saleable commodity. This film is a pain in the neck. I don't know how they did it, friends, but the producers of this motion picture have managed to make sex a dull subject. You'd think that any film featuring handsome Simon Brent as a trendy young stud designer, romping merrily between one steamy bedroom scene and another, might at least hold your attention. But by the time the hero's final conquest (and they are innumerable) gets her gear off and gets down to business, most of the audience is yawning and scratching, checking their watches or just plain snoring. Maybe the fact that the acting is so terrible has a little something to do with it. The best performance of the film is put in by an Italian extra who plays a hotel waiter and keeps saying 'Mama Mia!' With dialogue like that, how could anyone possibly stay interested? Brent spends all his time sitting around looking lustful, and the females in the cast are all very good at undoing buttons and, apparently, nothing else."
