= Her Private Hell (1968 film) =

1968 British film by Norman J. Warren

- Cover of the BFI Flipside Blu‑ray/DVD release
- Directed by: Norman J. Warren
- Screenplay by: Glynn Christian
- Produced by: Bachoo Sen
- Starring: Lucia Modugno; Terry Skelton; Daniel Ollier; Pearl Catlin; Robert Crewdson
- Cinematography: Peter Jessop
- Edited by: Norman J. Warren (uncredited)
- Music by: John Scott
- Production company: Piccadilly Pictures
- Distributed by: Richard Schulman Entertainments
- Release date: 4 January 1968
- Running time: 84 minutes
- Country: United Kingdom
- Languages: English; French
- Budget: £18,000

Her Private Hell is a 1968 British sexploitation film directed by Norman J. Warren and starring Lucia Modugno. It was written by Glynn Christian. The film was Warren's directorial debut and the first of two films, the second being Loving Feeling (1968), that Warren made for Bachoo Sen and Richard Schulman, founders of Piccadilly Pictures.

It has been called "Britain's first narrative sex film".

== Plot ==
A young Italian woman called Marisa arrives in London to model for a magazine owned by Neville and Margaret. She is sent to live in an ultramodern flat belonging to Bernie, the magazine's top photographer – ostensibly for her safety, but in reality to prevent her from being poached by rival publications. Though surrounded by luxury, Marisa comes to realise that her employers control nearly every aspect of her life. She begins a sexual relationship with Bernie but quickly learns that she is not the first model he has seduced.

Although Marisa is only willing to pose semi-clothed, Neville wants the magazine to show full nudity. Matt – a younger, up-and-coming photographer – urges Marisa to leave, claiming that Neville, Margaret and Bernie see her as nothing more than a "money-making machine". Later, Matt drives Marisa to the countryside for an avant-garde photoshoot in which Marisa freely poses nude. Marisa becomes romantically involved with Matt, creating a love triangle with him and Bernie.

Matt's photos end up in Margaret's possession. Later, to Marisa's torment, they are published in a foreign magazine. Margaret, Matt and Bernie all deny selling the photos. Matt is disturbed by the leak and wants to take Marisa away. He confronts Neville, who offers him his own studio if he drops the matter. Meanwhile, Marisa is determined to leave with Bernie, but has a change of heart when Matt denounces Margaret and Bernie to their faces, telling them that "integrity and self-respect are more important than money." Matt and Marisa drive away together. Bernie comforts a tearful Margaret, assuring her that "there'll be others."

The final scene reveals that Bernie and Margaret are married, that Margaret condones Bernie's affairs and that no one told Marisa she was sleeping with Margaret's husband.

== Cast ==
- Lucia Modugno as Marisa
- Terry Skelton as Bernie
- Pearl Catlin as Margaret
- Daniel Ollier as Matt
- Jeanette Wild as Paula
- Mary Land as Sally
- Robert Crewdson as Neville
- Michael Craze as Party Guest

== Themes ==
Josephine Botting of the British Film Institute (BFI) has commented on the film's atmosphere of isolation, felt especially by the naive Marisa, and the distrust that it engenders among the characters. According to Botting: "In Her Private Hell, suspicion springs from a sense of the characters' remoteness from each other, both literal and metaphorical. The use of location adds to the feeling – characters enter and leave Bernie's flat with no indication of where they've been or where they're going [...]"

Botting and David McGillivray also identify a theme of power and manipulation, noting that Margaret and Bernie use sex to control others. Both characterise this open-mindedness to adultery as acceptance of a swinging lifestyle. McGillivray describes this as an "early reference to sexual behaviour that was to become a popular theme in exploitation movies of the early 1970s". He compares the film's "corruption-of-the-innocent" premise to the plots of 1930s American melodramas such as Reefer Madness (1936).

== Production ==
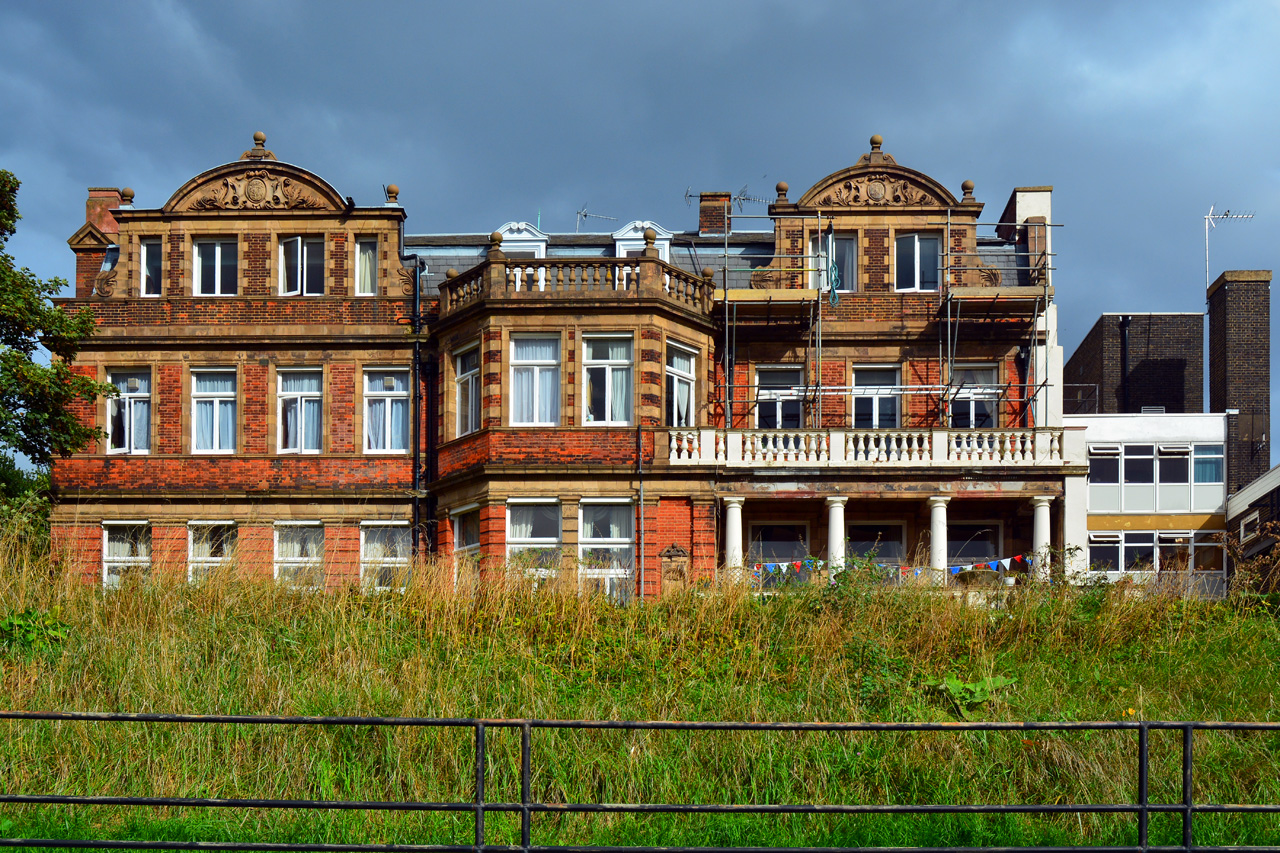
Branch Hill Lodge in Hampstead, one of the filming locations

According to Warren, producer Bachoo Sen had approached Richard Schulman, owner of London's Paris Pullman Cinema, with a proposal to set up a film production partnership. At the time of the meeting, Schulman was screening Warren's short film Fragment. As Sen and Schulman were lacking a director, Sen contacted Warren with an offer to make two films for them, which Warren accepted. In Warren's own words, "I had no idea what the film would be, but to be honest, I would have said yes to anything. I was 25 and desperate to direct a feature film."

Her Private Hell was written by Glynn Christian, a New Zealand immigrant who based the story on his own experiences as a foreigner living in 1960s London. The film was shot in two weeks between August and September 1967, on a budget of £18,000 (approximately £287,000 in 2025). Filming was conducted at London's Isleworth Studios alongside the biopic Isadora, as well as on location at Branch Hill Lodge, Branch Hill, Hampstead. To keep production costs down, Warren edited the film himself.

Tony Britton and Peter Reynolds were considered for roles in the film. Udo Kier auditioned for the part of Matt but lost to French actor Daniel Ollier. Due to Ollier's thick accent, the character's lines were dubbed by another actor. Lucia Modugno knew little English at the time of production. Botting speculates that Sen cast Modugno and Ollier to boost the film's appeal to audiences in continental Europe.

== Release and reception ==
According to Barry Forshaw, Her Private Hell was "considered very strong stuff in 1967." By order of the British Board of Film Censors, several scenes of nudity were cut prior to release. The film was released in January 1968 and ran as half of a double bill with French feature Les Vierges (1963). It was a commercial success, with one London cinema showing the film for two years. Noting a relative lack of on-screen sexuality compared to later erotic films, Jonathan Rigby comments: "[...] the mere fact that the characters have sex in the course of the story (albeit not on camera) seems to have been enough to ensure a box office stampede." The US release was slightly shorter than the British version and contained more nudity.

Warren remembered Her Private Hell as "not a great film", but added that it "[made] a lot of money at the box office", which was "very good for my reputation."

=== Critical response ===
In a contemporary review, the Monthly Film Bulletin was dismissive of the film, calling it "embarrassingly self-conscious". It criticised what it regarded as a weak story with poorly-developed characters and a lack of excitement. The Daily Cinema described the film as a "very creditable first production by all concerned", noting the "attractive performance by the three leading players". However, it added that the film's "incredible" plot would have been better served by "greater pace and crisper editing". Kinematograph Weekly called the writing "novelettish" and commented that the cinematography of the sex scenes is let down by the resulting "visual clichés". It also stated: "The picture could have been a sharp, bitter (and perhaps, deserved) attack on the unpleasant means of money-making that can be behind an apparently innocent and well-behaved venture. It misses this admirable chance, however [...]"

Botting states that while the story "may seem a little far-fetched", the film overall "manages to be more than just a 'dull tit-and-bum parade'," commenting that its cast and direction "[raise it] above its genre and limitations." She also states that it "wisely eschews" the existentialism of Blowup (1966), a mystery thriller with a comparable premise. McGillivray calls Her Private Hell a "fine example of British independent exploitation cinema" but argues that Ollier's character may qualify as "the screen's dullest love interest". He suggests that various aspects of the film, including its title sequence, were unwittingly influenced by the French New Wave, while the suspenseful scenes of Marisa's arrival at Bernie's flat give "a foretaste of the horror director Warren was to become". Drawing comparisons with European art cinema, Sam Dunn of the BFI notes that the scenes of Marisa's pick-up from the airport are without music or audible dialogue, creating a "distinctly un-British" feel. He believes that Her Private Hell "lacks the subtlety and emotional complexity" of Warren's short films. Forshaw considers Modugno to be "palpably not equal to the histrionic demands the director makes of her; her talents lay elsewhere."

Writing for review website The Spinning Image, Graeme Clark calls the film "not exactly a riveting melodrama". He also comments that while the titular "private hell" presumably refers to Marisa's humiliation, "if anything it's a public hell." Anthony Nield of The Digital Fix describes the "generic" plot as "without doubt the least interesting thing" about the film. He considers Her Private Hell to be influenced by "arthouse sensibilities" but still "a slice of exploitation cinema [...] the film is always fighting that tension between quality and trash." However, he adds that the cast's "solid if rarely remarkable" performances "elevate the characters above the 'sexploitation' norm", and that despite its weaknesses, the film manages to keep the audience interested. Nield also states that along with Warren's earlier short films Incident (1959) and Fragment (1966), Her Private Hell "reveals a side of Warren rarely glimpsed: that of the sensitive director, one who was in thrall to François Truffaut and particularly adept at handling female performances."

Rigby, who argues that The Flesh Is Weak (1957) had a similar plot, describes Her Private Hell as an "unjustly forgotten nugget of British cinema history". He comments: "The sobriety and seriousness of the story only underlines the film's importance, because in relation to the tidal wave of movies it inspired, Her Private Hell now seems like an anomaly. In just a few years British studios would sire their own sex stars [...] and become clogged with sniggering-schoolboy erotic comedies that were significantly free of eroticism or indeed comedy."

=== Home media ===
In 2012, the BFI released the film on DVD and Blu-ray as part of its Flipside series. This marked the film's first appearance on home video. In the absence of obtainable release prints or negatives, the dual-format release was created from the BFI's own archive print, re-cut using material from an American videotape copy and footage supplied by Warren.

== Legacy ==
The film shares its title with a 2026 film by Danish filmmaker Nicolas Winding Refn, though the latter is not a remake and does not share a similar narrative.
