= Loving Feeling =

1969 British film by Norman J. Warren

- Film poster
- Directed by: Norman J. Warren
- Written by: Robert Hewison; Bachoo Sen; Norman J. Warren
- Produced by: Bachoo Sen
- Starring: Georgina Ward; Simon Brent; Paula Patterson
- Cinematography: Peter Jessop
- Edited by: Tristam Cones
- Music by: John Scott
- Production company: Piccadilly Pictures
- Distributed by: Richard Schulman Entertainments
- Release dates: 26 September 1968 (West Germany); 6 March 1969 (United Kingdom)
- Running time: 82 minutes
- Country: United Kingdom
- Language: English
- Budget: £30,000

Loving Feeling is a 1968 British drama or sexploitation film directed by Norman J. Warren and starring Simon Brent, Georgina Ward and Paula Patterson. It was written by Robert Hewison, Bachoo Sen and Warren.

== Plot ==
Stevee Day, a radio DJ, begins an affair with his secretary, Carol. When his wife Suzanne finds out, she leaves him for their mutual friend Scott. Now separated, the couple start the process of selling their house. Each party longs to get back with the other, but Suzanne is upset by Stevee's immaturity and his refusal to give up Carol. Stevee tires of Carol and embarks on other affairs – first with Carol's flatmate, Jane, then with a French model who asked for his autograph. He decides that Jane is only interested in him because of his fame, and ends his relationship with her. Meanwhile, Carol is increasingly focused on her career at the radio station while being romantically pursued by manager Philip.

Suzanne catches Stevee with Carol again and finally realises that their marriage is over. Carol tells Stevee that she and Philip are planning to move to New York. At the empty Day house, Suzanne gives Stevee back her wedding ring, and Stevee hands Scott his house key. Stevee then gets back in his car and drives away, tuning into the radio station as he goes.

== Cast ==
- Georgina Ward as Suzanne Day
- Simon Brent as Stephen "Stevee" Day
- Paula Patterson as Carol Taylor
- John Railton as Scott Fisher
- Françoise Pascal as model
- Heather Kyd as Christine Johnson
- Peter Dixon as Philip Peterson
- Carol Cunningham as Jane Butler
- Jackie Allouis as Helen
- Sonya Benjamin as belly dancer
- Paul Endersby as old man on beach
- Richard Bartlett as sound mixer
- Allen John as restaurant manager
- John Aston as Jane's boyfriend
- Stanley Folb as press photographer
- Robert Hewison as radio producer
- Mary Land as girl
- Barry Stephens as chauffeur
- Penny Watts as girl

== Production ==
Loving Feeling was filmed between May and June 1968. It was shot mainly at Isleworth Studios with sets designed by art director Hayden Pearce. The production also included location shoots in Margate and London.

The film's UK release was complicated by a dispute between producer Bachoo Sen and the British Board of Film Censors (BBFC). Sen was unhappy with the board's instructions for cuts to various sex scenes to secure an X certificate, preferring the uncut version. In one of his letters to head censor John Trevelyan, he accused the board of acting as "moral preachers trying to remake films [...] in accordance with their likes and dislikes." At one point Sen tried to bypass the board by applying for X certification from the Greater London Council, but it too required cuts.

Sen withheld payments from several of those who were involved in making Her Private Hell and Loving Feeling. This led to a legal case that stripped him of his rights to both films. He later moved to the United States, taking the film negatives with him, which prevented Warren and the other UK stakeholders from receiving any royalty payments.

== Reception ==
The film was commercially successful.

David Wilson of The Monthly Film Bulletin described the film as a "crude miscellany of episodes from the sex life of a singularly unprepossessing disc jock who drifts from bed to bed with a casual indifference to anyone's feelings – loving or otherwise. Execrably scripted and limply acted, the whole tedious business is put across with an air of half-hearted contrivance which the unsynchronised dialogue only compounds."

The New York Times called the film "a curious little sex-go-round package from England that almost achieves merit in spite of itself", adding that it "says a bit, but could have said much more." The review praised the "brisk" direction and "beautiful" cinematography, as well as the performances of Brent, Ward and Patterson.
