= Norman J. Warren =

English film director (1942–2021)

- Warren in 2016
- Born: Norman John Warren; 25 June 1942; Hammersmith, London, England
- Died: 11 March 2021 (aged 78)
- Occupations: Film director; Film editor; producer
- Years active: 1959–2021
- Notable work: Satan's Slave (1976); Prey (1977); Terror (1978); Outer Touch (1979); Inseminoid (1981)
- Style: Horror; science fiction; sex comedy

Norman John Warren (25 June 1942 – 11 March 2021) was an English film director best known for such 1970s horror films as Satan's Slave (1976), Prey (1977) and Terror (1978). Warren is also known for sex comedies such as Outer Touch (also known as Outer Spaced and Spaced Out, 1979).

== Life and career ==
Warren was born in Hammersmith. His father Stanley was a survivor of the October 1942 sinking of HMS Curacoa. After contracting polio when he was five years old, Warren permanently lost the use of his right arm. His gradual recovery, which included prolonged iron lung treatment, left him unable to attend school for four years.

An avid film fan from childhood, Warren entered the film industry as a runner on The Millionairess (1960) and as an assistant director (The Dock Brief, 1962) before directing the short film Fragment (1965). Calcutta-born Bachoo Sen (1934–2002), owner of the Astral Cinema in Brewer Street, London, who had an interest in film production, saw Fragment and subsequently hired Warren to direct two feature-length sex films, Her Private Hell (1968) and Loving Feeling (1969). Both were successes, but Warren saw little of the profits.

Not wanting to be typecast as a director of sex films, Warren turned down a third directing offer from Sen (Love Is a Splendid Illusion, 1970) and had to wait several years to raise the money required to make Satan's Slave (1976), the first of a series of horror films that he directed. Warren's final two films, Bloody New Year and Gunpowder (both 1987), were hampered by low budgets imposed by producer Maxine Julius.

Although Warren did not release a feature film between 1987 and 2016, he continued to work in the industry directing music videos and educational short films such as Person to Person, a BBC film designed for students of English. His horror films developed a following, culminating in the making of Evil Heritage, a 1999 documentary about his work, and the release of a DVD box set in 2004.

In 2007, Warren worked on the supplementary features for the Region 1 DVD releases of Corridors of Blood (1958), The Haunted Strangler (1958) and First Man into Space (1959). He was a regular guest at Manchester's Festival of Fantastic Films.

In 2016, Warren announced whilst being interviewed by journalist Steve Green that he was in post-production on a new feature film, a thriller set in London's Chinatown. Susu, co-produced by Warren but written and directed by Yixi Sun, was released in 2018.

== Death ==
Warren died on 11 March 2021, aged 78. His manager said he had been in poor health for a year prior.

== Filmography ==
Year	Title	Notes
1968	Her Private Hell	Directorial Debut
1968	Loving Feeling	
1976	Satan's Slave	
1977	Prey	Alternative title: Alien Prey
1978	Terror	
1979	Outer Touch	Alternative titles: Spaced Out, Outer Reach and Outer Spaced
1981	Inseminoid	Alternative title: Horror Planet
1986	Gunpowder	
1987	Bloody New Year	Alternative titles: Time Warp Terror and Horror Hotel

== Bibliography ==
- Gods in Polyester, or, a Survivors' Account of 70's Cinema Obscura (2004, Succubus Press) (contributed pieces on Satan's Slave, Prey, Terror and Inseminoid)
- Gods in Spandex, or, a Survivors' Account of 80's Cinema Obscura (2007, Succubus Press) (contributed pieces on Bloody New Year and Gunpowder)
