= William F. Matthews =

British bookbinder (1898–1977)

William F. Matthews CGIA
- Born: William Frederick Matthews; 7 January 1898
- Died: 8 April 1977 (aged 79)
- Education: Central School of Arts and Crafts, London
- Occupation: Bookbinder
- Known for: First bookbinder to be awarded the City and Guilds of London Insignia Award (CGIA)

William Frederick Matthews CGIA (7 January 1898 – 8 April 1977) was a leading British bookbinder. He trained at the Central School of Arts and Crafts in London before apprenticing at the bindery of W. T. Morrell & Co.

Matthews won a gold medal at the Paris exhibition of 1925 and started his own practice in 1926. He taught at the central school for nearly 50 years during which time his notable pupils included Edgar Mansfield, Roger Powell, and Bernard Middleton.

Matthews published two guides to bookbinding and in 1976 was the first bookbinder awarded the City and Guilds of London Insignia Award.

== Early life and family ==
William Matthews was born on 7 January 1898 to a carpenter also named William Frederick and his wife Alice Mary Matthews. In August 1921, he married Ellen Rawlinson at the parish church, Tooting, in London.

== Career ==
Matthews studied at the Central School of Arts and Crafts in London where he was trained by Peter McLeish, Noel Rooke, and Graily Hewitt. He was apprenticed at the bindery of W. T. Morrell & Co. and won a gold medal at the Paris exhibition of 1925. He started his own practice in 1926.

Matthews later taught at the central school for nearly 50 years, and trained Anthony Cains, Bryan Maggs, H. J. Desmond Yardley, Edgar Mansfield, Roger Powell, and Bernard Middleton. In 1929, he published Bookbinding: A manual for those interested in the craft of bookbinding, and in 1930, Simple Bookbinding for Junior Schools.

In 1976, Matthews was the first bookbinder awarded the City and Guilds of London Insignia Award (CGIA).

== Binding style ==
Alms for Oblivion: An antiquary's scrapbook by Mortimer Wheeler bound by Matthews in goat skin, 1970

Matthews was described by Catherine Porter in Miller's Collecting Modern Books as "one of the greatest craftsmen of the 20th century", being particularly skilled in gold-tooling and lettering. His work is generally noted for its "sober dignity" but with bindings produced for pleasure having a "joyful charm". He favoured bindings in oasis Morocco with marbled end-pages from Morris Marbles of Oxford. Doublures and end leaves could be in Morocco, silk, or vellum. He did his own edge-gilding. In 1970, he bound a copy of Mortimer Wheeler's Alms for Oblivion: An antiquary's scrapbook (1966) in olive-green goat skin with a sun design on the boards bordered by groups of overlapping radiating gilt lines. The book was presented by the author to the bookbinder Daphne Beaumont-Wright.

A bound volume of Matthew's bookbinding designs is in the Bridwell Library of the Southern Methodist University's Perkins School of Theology. He designed and bound it in full terra-cotta Morocco, and included designs from 1928 to 1976.

== Death and legacy ==
Matthews died in hospital on 8 April 1977. His home at the end of his life was Track End, Admiral's Way (Admiral's Walk in probate entry), in Pirbright, Surrey. His funeral was at St Michael and All Angels church in Pirbright, followed by cremation. He left an estate of £27,328. In 1978, his work was the subject of a joint exhibition with Edgar Mansfield at the Victoria & Albert Museum in London.

== Selected publications ==
- Bookbinding: A manual for those interested in the craft of bookbinding.. Gollancz, London, 1929.
- Simple Bookbinding for Junior Schools. Sir Isaac Pitman & Sons, London, 1930.
