= John Langdon (typographer) =

American graphic designer and artist (1946–2026)

- Born: John Wilbur Langdon; April 19, 1946; Wynnewood, Pennsylvania, U.S.
- Died: January 1, 2026 (aged 79)
- Education: Episcopal Academy; Dickinson College
- Known for: Ambigrams
- Website: www.johnlangdon.net

John Langdon (April 19, 1946 – January 1, 2026) was an American graphic designer, ambigram artist, painter and writer. From 1977, Langdon worked as a freelance artist specializing in logos, type, and lettering. He retired from teaching in Drexel University's graphic design program in November 2015 after 27 years of service.

== Early life and education ==
John Wilbur Langdon was born in Wynnewood, Pennsylvania, on April 19, 1946, to George Taft and Eleanor (née Hazard) Langdon. He has one brother, Courtney, who is the namesake of their grandfather, who himself was a Romance language professor at Brown University and was recognized by the Italian government for his translation of Dante's Divine Comedy from Italian into English blank verse. Langdon's grandmother was a painter in Paris during the impressionist era.

As a teenager, Langdon was inspired by a graphic he had seen years before at a University of Pennsylvania football game. It showed two football players from opposing teams crouched next to each other; from the viewpoint depicted in the image, the players' numbers spelled out the word hell. He experimented with words in this way throughout his childhood and into college and his "earliest significant inspiration" was Salvador Dalí. Other inspirations throughout the formative years of Langdon's ambigrams included the yin and yang symbol, M. C. Escher, psychedelic art and lettering, Rick Griffin, Herb Lubalin, cubism, René Magritte, Edgar Allan Poe, Ogden Nash, John Barth, and Tom Robbins.

Langdon attended Episcopal Academy, the school where his father worked, before attending Dickinson College. There, he played four years of college soccer, took studio painting classes, and majored in English. He was largely a self-taught artist. Langdon successfully avoided the Vietnam War draft through legal student deferment, one of his goals in seeking higher education.

== Career ==
After college, Langdon worked at Walter T. Armstrong Typography "setting headlines for ad copy" and attended drawing, painting, and advertising classes at Philadelphia College of Art in the evenings. He was inspired by magazines such as Communication Arts, Graphis, and Lettergraphics to pursue his interest in typography and logo design. After leaving Armstrong, he spent five years at Sulpizio Associates, where he primarily made pharmaceutical brochures. Langdon became a stay-at-home dad and freelance artist specializing in logos, type, and lettering in 1977 after the birth of his daughter. He created his first ambigram, which he called an "upside-down word", in 1972 using the word heaven. By 1980, Langdon claims both he and Stanford graduate student Scott Kim invented ambigrams, albeit separately. Kim called his creations inversions; in 1984, Douglas Hofstadter coined the term ambigram. The first ambigram Langdon sold was of the word STARSHIP to Jefferson Starship for their 1976 album Spitfire. In the 1980s, he taught lettering at Moore College of Art and Design for three years before joining the faculty at Drexel University's Westphal College of Media Arts and Design to teach lettering and logo design. In the 1990s, Langdon began to paint words.

Langdon puts emphasis on philosophy, most notably Taoism, while creating ambigrams. In a 2006 interview with the Orange County Register, he shared that "the lesson of Taoism is that if you have only one vantage point, you're not seeing the truth ... the more ambiguity you invite into your life, the more things make sense and become understandable." Langdon uses mathematics, particularly Fibonacci sequences, bell curves, and normal distribution to "explore relationships of everyday objects and situations that often go unnoticed".

In 1992, Three Rivers Press published Wordplay, Langdon's first book about ambigrams. Each ambigram was accompanied by a philosophical essay. Math professor Dick Brown contacted him with questions about his craft and also asked if he would be interested in designing a cover for his son Dan's new album, Angels and Demons. Brown's music career fell through but he contacted Langdon again several years later to request re-use of the original Angels and Demons ambigram as well as to commission Langdon for more, this time for his book Angels & Demons. The two became friends and Langdon served as partial inspiration for Robert Langdon, the main character of Angels and Demons, The Da Vinci Code, and subsequent novels. Langdon later created the animated title for The Da Vinci Code film as well as the logo of the Depository Bank of Zurich, a fictional bank in the movie. A second edition of Wordplay was published in 2005.

In 2007, Langdon and fellow graphic artist Hal Taylor won an award from the Type Directors Club for their font Flexion. Two years later, along with Jason Santa Maria, Khoi Vinh, Liz Danzico, and Dan Cederholm, Langdon created Typedia, a wiki-style font library. In 2012, he put on an exhibition that showed word paintings based on Rorschach tests. This was inspired by an Andy Warhol exhibit from the 1990s that featured Warhol's Rorschach paintings. In 2013, Langdon did a TEDx talk at Drexel about "the relationship between major changes in typesetting technology and the appearance of horrible new fonts".

Over the course of his career, Langdon has done work for John Mayer, Aerosmith, Sony Pictures, DirecTV, Nike, and Will Shortz, among others. His work has been shown in galleries across the country, including the New Britain Museum of American Art, Type Directors Club, Noyes Museum, Shipley School, University of Maryland, and Drexel University. His work has also been featured in U&lc Magazine, Letter Arts Review, and in the Type Directors Club annual. Langdon has provided design criticism for magazines such as Critique; forewords for books such as The Art of Deception by Brad Honeycutt and Eye Twisters by Burkard Polster; and prefaces for publications such as Calligraffiti by Niels Shoe Meulman. He has been a member of the Type Directors Club, the Society of Scribes, and The One Club. Langdon retired from Drexel in November 2015 after 27 years.

== Personal life and death ==
Langdon and his wife Lynn had one daughter, Jessica. While at Drexel, Langdon split his time between Philadelphia's Fairmount neighborhood as well as "a retreat in the Pennsylvanian woods".

Langdon died January 1, 2026, at the age of 79.
