= Conservation and restoration of illuminated manuscripts =

Care and treatment of decorated texts

The conservation and restoration of illuminated manuscripts is the care and treatment of illuminated manuscripts which have cultural and historical significance so that they may be viewed, read, and studied now and in the future. It is a specialty case of the conservation and restoration of parchment within the field of conservation and restoration of books, manuscripts, documents and ephemera.

Preserving parchment becomes more difficult when pigments, inks, and illumination are added into the equation. Pigments do not dye parchment; instead, they lie on the surface of the parchment and so are rather fragile. The goal of restoring illuminated manuscripts should be to make them resilient to damage while altering them as little as possible. Each individual manuscript, and even each individual page, must be considered as a separate object with different aspects that must be taken into consideration. This in turn will help determine the best course of preservation or conservation treatment.

One of the best ways to become familiar with the variety of issues caused by various materials is to learn about how such manuscripts were made in the past and how they were subsequently treated in later years.

== Inks and pigments ==
The best distinction between inks and pigments is that ink is a colored liquid while pigments are colored particles suspended in a liquid. Areas colored by pigments usually have multiple layers of pigments and other mediums. The most important aspect of preserving pigments and inks is to identify their composition. Some techniques are not suitable for certain pigments and will do further harm.

=== Aging properties ===
- Iron gall ink – very popular black ink; corrosive; can become brittle and fade.
- Lead white – darkens when exposed to air; reacts with verdigris and orpiment; generally stable to light.
- Orpiment – loses color quickly with exposure to ozone; decays slowly in water; dissolves in hydrochloric acid and sodium hydroxide; reacts with lead- and copper-based pigments (such as lead white and verdigris); can corrode bindings; will not easily adhere to parchment and tend to flake off; cannot readily be consolidated with gelatin.
- Ultramarine – very stable to light but very unstable with acids; becomes friable and will crumble if outer skin is scraped, although this is hard to see at first without the aid of a microscope and can be made worse with the application of gelatin or other liquid consolidators.
- Verdigris – reacts with lead white and orpiment; decays parchment; tends to become friable and is not easily treated with gelatin or other liquid consolidators; chelating agents such as calcium and magnesium appear to prevent further degradation.

=== Identification ===
Identifying specific pigments is no easy task. Descriptions may be wrong or misleading and choosing the wrong treatment may cause irreversible damage.

Pigment identification techniques may be invasive or non-invasive. Invasive tests alter the manuscript in some way, usually by removing some pigment to test a sample. They are generally reliable but results are not always clear. Non-invasive tests do not alter the manuscript and are much better for conservation purposes than the invasive methods of identification. Some non-invasive methods include:

- Microscopes
- Observation under UV, IR, and visible light
- X-ray fluorescence (XRF)
- Particle-induced X-ray emission (PIXE-α)
- Raman spectroscopy

Raman spectroscopy analyzes the molecular vibrations of the pigments and uses this data to map out its chemical makeup. This works on the notion that every substance interacts with radiation in different ways, and these differing ways if measured can help identify the substance without having to take a sample. Unlike other non-invasive identification techniques the results of Raman spectroscopy are much more certain. It is even possible to analyze a pigment beneath a glaze or other treatment.

== Parchment ==
Parchment is hygroscopic. As such, environmental conditions such as humidity must be kept under control. Pigments add another layer to the problem, forcing a preservationist to fit environmental conditions to two different (and possibly conflicting) sets of ideal limits.

Problems can occur when parchment is exposed to high humidity for a long period of time. For example, collagen in the pages could dissolve and stick together.

These problems are further compounded by the fact that pigments do not dye parchment; instead, they lie on the surface of the parchment and so are rather fragile. Pressing an illuminated manuscript pushes the pigment down, altering the image itself and likely causing damage (such as a relief effect to the other side of the page) so it is very important to not put any pressure upon images on parchment, especially when it is wet. This fact also has to be taken into account when cleaning dirt from the image and when encapsulating or framing illuminated parchment for an exhibition. There must be enough room between the image and the protective surface (such as Perspex) that the image will not be subject to rubbing if the parchment should expand with rising humidity.

== Methods of repair ==
=== Consolidation ===
Consolidation is a process that can either strengthen the bond between pigment and parchment or add protection to pigments and other finishes from aqueous treatments. Strengthening the bond between pigments and parchment help prevent the pigments from flaking and pulling away. The challenge comes with achieving the best consolidation results while altering the object as little as possible. The material used for consolidation should be appropriate for the pigments, the parchment, and any other aspects that may be affected by the application.

Soluble nylon was used until the mid-1970s when concerns over the material's stability emerged. Parchment size was then favored until the mid-1990s when leaf gelatin gained popularity. This is not to say that gelatin is always the best consolidant to use; no consolidation technique should be used without first considering the pigments and other materials involved, though. For example, gelatin causes white lead to become friable. This problem is compounded by the flexible nature of parchment. One solution to this particular problem is to use some form of a cellulose ether such as methylcellulose, instead of gelatin. Again, this is not necessarily the right choice for every situation.

There are a few basic requirements for any consolidation agent:

- It has to cause a strong bond to form between the pigment and parchment;
- A strong bond also has to be formed between the layers of pigments and any loose particles;
- There has to be little alteration of the chemicals, including appearance;
- It cannot cause the parchment to lose flexibility.

==== Ultrasonic mister ====
One device recently used in consolidation techniques is the ultrasonic mister. Created in 1991 by Stefan Michalski, this device lends itself well to consolidating materials that react badly with liquids. Gelatin is the preferred consolidant.

The ultrasonic mister is usually used in conjunction with a paper suction table to direct the mist at the media and prevent distortion. This is not the best treatment for illuminated manuscripts that have printing on both sides, though. In this case it is better to forgo the suction table and instead use the lowest setting on the mister and to monitor the process carefully.

Problems may arise if condensed mist falls onto the parchment from the nozzle so it is advisable that the device be placed on the floor or a similarly low level to coax mist to drain back into the mister instead of falling upon the parchment.

=== Flattening and crease removal ===
Traditional methods of removing creases and flattening parchment through humidifying have been detrimental to the state of any pigments, causing them to come off the parchment slightly. This is because the parchment and pigments take on and give off moisture at different rates, causing them to expand and contract at varying rates and thus loosening the pigment from the surface. This results in flaking, cupping, and cracking.

The question becomes whether flattening creased parchment to some extent will cause more or less damage to the image than would be caused by not removing the crease. Sometimes not flattening the parchment in some respect will lead to the further degradation of an image. In these cases some form of hydration is necessary. Due to the nature of pigments, though, it is desirable to avoid direct contact with liquid water. This can be accomplished with Gore-Tex. Gore-Tex now has controllable pore size and can block out many liquids, including liquid water and many conservation chemicals. Water vapor can still pass through the pores, though, so it is possible to hydrate the parchment and remove a crease without introducing liquid water to the pigmented image. This can be achieved by sandwiching a manuscript in Gore-Tex in varying ways to achieve the desired results.

=== Mending ===
Repairing a tear in a parchment with images or text on it is more of a challenge than mending a piece of parchment that does not have any such issues. Care must be taken to not cover up or obscure in any way the image or the text. Materials such as Goldbeater's skin can be made transparent enough to do this but great care still needs to be taken.

== Ethics ==
The ethics of illuminated manuscript preservation involve the potential for adversely altering the source material during the course of the repair work. In order to ensure the integrity of the manuscript, great care must be taken during any preservation activity. Risk assessments should be made to determine the potential impact of preservation work on the manuscript, and weigh that against the potential benefits of the restoration work itself.

== Conservation challenges ==
The Illuminated Book: Conserving an Art Form

The term illuminated manuscript comes from two sources, both of which originated in Medieval Latin. The first is manuscriptus, a combination of manu ‘by hand’ and scriptus ‘written’. The second is the Latin word illuminare, which translates to ‘adorned’. It is this second term that immediately catches attention, letting readers know that this particular manuscript is special, illuminated or ‘adorned.’ An illuminated manuscript is a book, usually religious in nature, that has been intricately decorated with paints, inks, and metal leaf such as gold and silver. This can include full page illustrations, intricate initials at the beginning of paragraphs and chapters, and embellishment to particularly important areas of text. A surprising number of these books have survived the years to exist in the modern era; mostly thanks to their value and, in many cases, religious significance. Nonetheless, the very embellishments that allowed these books to survive are the reason that today's conservators find illuminated manuscripts more challenging to maintain than their plain counterparts. This is important not just to conservators, but to the historians who rely on them to trace the economic trends and artistic evolution in a time that is commonly referred to as the Dark Ages, or more properly known as the Migration Period (476–800 C.E.). Thousands of illuminated manuscripts have survived the ages, yet many are slowly being lost today because they are not being properly conserved. Illuminated manuscripts are some of the hardest books to conserve, but every effort must be made to preserve them not only for their own beauty and value but for their historical significance as some of the only surviving written records of an era.

Part of the complexity of illuminated manuscripts lies in their historical context. An illuminated manuscript is, in simple terms, a decorated book. They usually contain both painted illustrations, embellished text, and illumination with gold and other precious metals. With the advent and propagation of Christianity in medieval Europe, illustrated books rapidly became a way to convey religious teachings in a time when most of the population was illiterate. Because of this purpose, most of the illuminated manuscripts to have survived the ages are religious in nature. In most cases, rich patrons or churches would commission the creation of their own copies of various religious scriptures. These were most commonly complete copies of the Bible or a subsection, such as individual books of the Old Testament, collections of 150 psalms, or collections of the first four books of the New Testament (Anderson 9). In later cases, when more people could read, books of hours were also widely called for. All of these books were created by either nuns or monks, usually in a scriptorium connected to their church or abbey. Outside of the church, there were some examples of secular texts being illuminated. Astronomical treatises and copies of classical writers were some of the first examples, emerging as the trend of owning personal copies of religious texts spread among the wealthy. Later, histories and chronicles became more popular, coinciding with the gradual spread of knowledge and the founding of universities throughout Europe in the latter part of the Middle Ages (Anderson 13). These books were still most often produced by church scribes and illuminators; however, they were commissioned by private citizens or universities rather than the church. Without the illuminated manuscripts historians have to study today, much of this information about the gradual return of wealth and learning in the Migration Period would be difficult or even impossible to accurately trace and date. There were many reasons for the creation of illuminated manuscripts, and these varied with each commission. However, the most common were either for teaching purposes or as shows of wealth. Because most common people were illiterate, they could only relate to stories of church doctrine through pictures rather than reading the words. Illustrating religious texts allowed people to see the stories that church leaders read to them, and to create a personal connection outside of the oral tradition. In this instance, illuminated manuscripts served the same purpose as stained glass windows in churches. They allowed the faithful to see the stories of their faith, lending them substance that might be absent from the spoken word. They could also serve as reminders of religious faith when a church service was not in progress. The second reason for the creation of illuminated manuscripts was as a show of wealth. In the case of church manuscripts, the books could both tell religious stories and remind the people of the power and wealth of the church. In the case of private commissions, the patron was able to demonstrate their wealth by purchasing lavish volumes for their personal libraries and chapels. This also served to demonstrate their fidelity to and strengthen their ties with the church, whose support and influence with the common people played a major part in keeping the upper class in power. Because all but the very smallest of local churches had at least a plain copy of the bible, the range from completely unadorned manuscripts to the lavish and intricate designs embellished with rich gold leaf seen in the more famous versions of the art are clearly represented. Where each book fell on this range closely reflected the wealth and influence of its owner, whether that was an upper-class individual or a town. While this influence is also represented in buildings and other archeological evidence such as coinage and works of art, the prevalence of illuminated manuscripts from different areas and time periods provides a sort of historical litmus test to the prosperity of the region.

Before the invention of the printing press, making even the simplest book was a painstaking process. The paper was made by hand, the leather was prepared in tanneries, the binding threads were hand spun, and the inks were ground with a mortar and pestle. Even with all the materials assembled, the book still had to be stitched and glued together, then painstakingly written by hand by a scribe. Even so, hundreds of thousands of books were produced between the transition from papyrus scrolls to codices and the advent of the printing press. The initial transition that sparked this production occurred over time between the first and fifth centuries A.D. The transition from scrolls to codices began from a common tool used by merchants, the wax tablet. These tablets were simple panels covered in wax, which could be written in with a pointed stylus and then wiped clean again for reuse. They were normally kept together by rings passed through holes in their sides (Anderson 17). Once the format of a rectangular codex protected by hard or stiff covers had become a commonly known alternative to the scroll form previously used, it rapidly gained popularity for its durability and versatile applications. Over time, they became the standard form of written information. Gradually the intricate designs of tooled covers and decorated pages evolved to appeal to wealthy clients, and the books became an art form in and of themselves. Of these carefully created books, only about five percent were deemed important enough to be decorated with illustrations and illumination (Anderson 7).

To understand the challenges conservators face when dealing with these intricately decorated books, it is first necessary to understand how they were made. Bookbinders used some of the same techniques used today to create hand bound books. Sheets were folded in half, so that each one would form two pages. These were then nested one inside the other to create a gathering. These gatherings could include as many pages as the bookbinder chose, however there were usually relatively few to prevent the gathering from becoming too bulky. An alternative method was to fold a very large sheet of paper repeatedly to create many pages, then slit three of the four sides with a knife to create a sheaf of pages (Hamel 39). Many gatherings were sown together though pre-punched holes known as sowing stations. The pattern of sowing stations and the use of the thread was what determined the structure of the binding. Because scribes and artists often needed access to the entire sheets of paper to do their work, books from this time period were often prepared in loose bindings that could be easily undone to free a sheet of paper (Hamel 40). For both illuminated and unadorned books, these loose bindings cause problems for conservators when they have not been properly and firmly bound after the writing and decorating was completed. Entire gatherings of pages can come loose, needing to be carefully re-stitched into their correct locations. Because of the wide variance in materials used in the bindings of books from the era that illuminated manuscripts were made, it is possible to trace some back to specific binderies, meaning that the materials can be analyzed to understand what trade was going on in that area at the time. For example, if a lavish cover was inlayed with lapis lazuli, if would be possible to infer that the bindery was able to source materials from as far east as Afghanistan (Alexander 40). Certain kinds of leather can also be traced back to specific geographical regions, as some breeds of cow and goat were only found in specific areas at this time.

The pages used in books from this period also pose their own concerns. There were three main materials used for the pages of books in this time period: papyrus, parchment or vellum, and paper (Alexander 35). Papyrus was the primary writing material of the ancient world, and was created by beating stalks of the papyrus reed together until the fibers in the plant formed a tight, almost woven structure. Because it did not provide a stable surface for paint, this sort of paper was very rarely used for illuminated manuscripts. As for the paper most people would recognize today, the first true example was created in China around 105 A.D. using beaten, strained, and dried vegetable fibers such as tree bark. However, this paper was very expensive and generally had to be imported at the time that illuminated manuscripts were being widely made, so it appears less often than the third alternative, parchment (Permanence/Durability of the Book 11). It is worth noting that those manuscripts with paper pages are much harder to conserve, and the acids present in the plant fibers naturally cause it to yellow and break down over time. This process is irreversible, but can be slowed and limited by controlling the temperature, humidity, and light exposure of the paper. Turning to the final option, we reach the most common form of page used in illuminated manuscripts. Parchment and vellum are both made of very fine, prepared and treated animal skins that have been dried in a manner which leaves them flexible. The difference between them is that vellum is usually made with either goat, pig, or calf skin, while parchment is made from sheep skin (Langwell 44). Parchment provides an ideal surface for illumination, and was even placed into books which used other page materials in patches to allow for a good painting or illuminating surface (Alexander 35). This prevalent use of parchment provides some of the historical significance of illuminated manuscripts. The different kinds of hide used can be DNA tested with modern equipment, and often tell historians what area the book is from and sometimes where the hide was sourced from, mapping trade routes and patterns otherwise lost to history. There is one key conservation problem with parchment and vellum that was discovered even while it was being widely used: it is very susceptible to water damage. Not only does it mold quickly in high humidity environments, but early forms of ink that were commonly used on papyrus could simply be washed off without leaving a trace. It is believed that "Iron gall inks were devised to overcome this disadvantage," however even these inks can be wiped off fairly thoroughly if they are scrubbed (Langwell 43).

The issue of proper inks used on parchment also carries over to the paints used in the illustrations. This set of problems is truly unique to decorated books, and is the beginning of just what sets them apart as conservation challenges as opposed to their plain counterparts. In particular, the brilliant blue color of paint that is seen in many of the finest examples of the art is a challenge. Made from ground lapis lazuli this was the most expensive color of paint, as it was sourced from far away Afghanistan (Alexander 40). Any book bearing this color would have been especially costly, and helps to map the economic structure of Migration Period Europe through the supply chain used to create it and the person wealthy enough to afford it. Unfortunately, this particularly precious color is also the most difficult for conservators. It is prone to flaking and cupping, a form of contraction which causes the paint to crack and curve outwards in many little flakes, giving the appearance of tiny shingles that have been flipped upside-down. This means that even the slightest friction can catch the raised edges and cause the paint to flake off. It must be carefully consolidated with a nonreactive adhesive, without damaging other surrounding decoration (Clarkson 47). Many other paints used at the time were also poisonous. The compositions of many paints were discovered using Raman spectroscopy, a noninvasive method of analysis that bounces light off of a given pigment and reads back the compositions based on witch wavelengths are absorbed and reflected (De 75). Using this and other spectroscopic methods, it has been determined that the very common red pigment found in these books was created from red lead, or, more dangerously, the highly toxic compound cinnabar. Another variant of this common color was vermillion, created using heated mercury and sulfur. Yellow was often made using poisonous orpiment, or arsenic sulfide, and white was almost invariably created using lead. While there are some organic alternatives, such as yellow made from saffron, it is unknown if even a single illuminated manuscript does not contain toxic materials. These compounds can pose a danger to conservators, researchers, or those putting the books of display if they are aerated and should be carefully consolidated and never abraded. While many other paints and inks were used by the artist decorating the books, these examples convey both the wide ranges of the colors used and the dangers they posed. This added level of difficulty is a good example of what makes illuminated manuscripts harder to deal with than plan books. It is also worth noting that while the paints were a finishing measure for the book the painter did not actually do any designing. An earlier drawling would have set out the pattern and clearly labeled with colors should go where in places that would be covered with paint. These patterns and labels are visible using various imaging techniques. Some scribes also wrote or made small drawings in the margins of the books, often providing historians with a window into the life on the average man in the Migration Period. These little annotations are some of the only surviving records of everyday life from the time commonly known as the Dark Ages. Complaints about long work hours and little drawings of people and monsters can be seen both in the margins and in some cases under the paint of the illustrations.

The tradition of illustrating texts goes all the way back to the cradle of civilization, evolving through Egypt and the cultures of the Mediterranean. However, it was far less common for books and papers to be embellished with precious metals, and this aspect of illuminated manuscripts adds another facet of difficulty for conservators that is not found elsewhere. In the Middle Ages, gold was the symbol of royalty, a clear sign of wealth and status. Yet for all of that, it was actually fairly common. Indeed, by the late Middle Ages the most common use for gold was in coinage (De 65). Because of this, using small quantities of the precious metal in a book was not prohibitively expensive. Gold, and all other metals used for illumination, was hammered into incredibly thin sheets, allowing a tiny amount of gold to cover a large area. This thin sheet was then adhered to the pages using the particular illuminator's formula of adhesive. This variation in adhesives mean that if any work needs to be done by a conservator, several tests must be undergone to ensure that no modern consolidation or adhesive will react with, damage, or loosen the old glue. While this is an issue for conservators, in rare cases a glue can be traced to a specific bindery, thus placing the book in its correct area and context, making it far more useful to historians. Another challenge for conservators lies in the fact that the gold used in books was not always pure. Alloys of gold can be subject to corrosion, with can cause darkening of the metal, reaction with the adhesives and other paint, and staining of the paper. This is an inherent vice of illuminations done with pure silver as well. Regardless of the care and treatment, silver corrodes and darkens over time. While modern conservators have ways of limiting this though control of humidity, older books have often seen their illumination corrode to the point that to attempt to clean it would simply remove the metal entirely.

Conservation in the modern era does not only face issues with the objects themselves. While a corroded book is one issue, how to display that book to the public is another, potentially more complex problem. From a conservator's point of view, to best protect a book it should be placed in a controlled, dark environment, then swaddled in padding with plenty of circulating air and tightly controlled relative humidity. Once old damage has been repaired, the goal is to keep new damage from occurring. However, most illuminated manuscripts belong to museums and libraries. Moreover, these beautiful works are the pride of the collection in most cases, and any curator will naturally want their most enticing items on display to woo the visiting public. In addition, part of the cultural value of the books is what they can teach us about the missing part of history commonly known as the Dark Ages. Historians will often want to study and run tests on the books in hopes of learning something about the time and place they were made, such as what trade was present. Thus comes one of the great ethical issues in the field of conservation, the problem of preservation versus access. The question most often faced by conservators is how to display a book to the least damage for the longest time. The light that enables visitors to see the books also breaks down the lignin structures in paper pages, fades paints, and embrittles leather. The cradle that holds the book open for viewing may also strain the spine. These are only two of the myriad issues that must be addressed when dealing with these fragile books. Even more arise when tests need to be run or a historian wants to handle a book. Removing a sliver of paint for analysis by a mass spectrometer may reveal information about trade routes, but it also damages the book. Likewise, inspecting the drawings and inscriptions in the margins provides a unique historical window, but a careless historian might touch the page and damage fragile and flaking paint. Not all institutions have the funds to properly care for their collections either. While a few famous examples claim the spotlight in major institutions, small museums, libraries, and religious centers put their own, smaller treasures on display to the public without the expertise of a conservator to aid them.

The complex challenges of illuminated manuscripts make them a uniquely troublesome medium for conservation. Their illumination, adhesives, paints, inks, papers, and even their very bindings can pose issues ranging from toxic chemicals to lost pages. Some of these issues are universal to book conservation. The troubles with ink on parchment pages and of loose bindings can be found in any book contemporary to the Medieval and Migration Periods. Yet illuminated manuscripts take these usual issues and add to them with poisonous paint, corroding metals, and uniquely challenging materials such as the luxuriously expensive yet eternally flaking lapis lazuli paint. Illuminated manuscripts are also problematic because of their popularity amongst displays. For these reasons and many others, illuminated manuscripts are clearly more challenging to conservators than their plainer contemporaries. Hidden away in private collections and small institutions, some of these books are gradually falling into disrepair. This fact is all the more important when you look past the aesthetic and monetary value of these books and realize that they are some of the only surviving written pieces from a time when there is so little historical information available that textbooks call it the Dark Ages. In the future, as technology evolves, it may be possible to gradually bring the economy and social system of the Migration Period into the light by carefully analyzing these books.

== Digital preservation ==
Manuscript preservation may also take the form of digitization, which is particularly useful for vulnerable manuscripts and fragments susceptible to deterioration such as the burnt fragments extant from the Cotton library fire which have now been recorded using multispectral imaging by the British Library. Fragmentarium (Digital Research Laboratory for Medieval Manuscript Fragments) is an online database which, since September 2017, preserves and collates fragments of medieval manuscripts making them available to researchers, collectors and historians worldwide. It is an international collaboration of major libraries and collections including the British Library, Harvard, Stanford, Yale and the Vatican.

== Notable manuscript conservators ==
- Paul N. Banks
- Anthony Cains
- Don Etherington
- Carolyn Price Horton
- Nicholas Pickwoad
- Roger Powell
- Abigail B. Quandt
- Peter Waters
- Ivan Blinov

== Bibliography ==
- Anderson, Janice. Illuminated Manuscripts. New York: Todtri, 1999. Print.
- Alexander, J J. G. Medieval Illuminators and Their Methods of Work. New Haven: Yale University Press, 1992. Print.
- Clarkson, Christopher. The Kennicott Bible: Its Illumination, Binding, Conservation Problems and Repair. Collection Management. 31 (2007): 31-56. Print.
- Dean, John. World View of Book Conservation. Collection Management. 31 (2007): 139-154. Print.
- De, Hamel C. The British Library Guide to Manuscript Illumination: History and Techniques. Toronto: University of Toronto Press, 2001. Print.
- Gray, EP. "Book Binding." Bulletin of the Medical Library Association. 5.2 (1915): 26-32. Print.
- Langwell, William H. The Conservation of Books and Documents. Westport, Conn: Greenwood Press, 1974. Print.
- Le, Gac A, Gac A. Le, M Guerra, S Longelin, M Manso, S Pessanha, A.I.M Seruya, M.L Carvalho, I.D Nogueira, and J.C Frade. "Microscopy and X-Ray Spectroscopy Analyses for Assessment of Gilding and Silvering Techniques of Portuguese Illuminated Manuscripts." Microscopy and Microanalysis. 21.1 (2015): 20-55. Print.
- Permanence/Durability of the Book – VII: Physical and Chemical Propertias of Book Papers, 1507-1949. W. J. Barrow Research Laboratory, INC., 1974. Print.
- Solechnik, N I. A. New Methods for the Restoration and Preservation of Documents and Books: (novye Metody Restavratsii Knig). Jerusalem: Israel Program for Scientific Translations, 1964. Print.
