= Julian Waters =

American calligrapher

Julian Waters (born 1957) is a calligrapher, type designer and teacher.

== Early life ==
He was born in Hampshire, England in 1957 and is the son of calligrapher Sheila Waters and book binder/conservator Peter Waters. He now lives in Gaithersburg, Maryland, United States.

== Teaching career ==
Starting in 1979 Waters studied with German type designer Hermann Zapf. In 1981-82 Waters worked with Gerard Valerio at Bookmark Studio in Washington DC, specializing in logos, books and publication design. In 1984 he opened his own studio in Capitol Hill. The same year, Zapf asked the 27-year-old Julian to substitute and teach his two-week masterclass at Rochester Institute of Technology. Waters ultimately succeeded Zapf in 1989.

Since 1978 he has taught specialized seminars on lettering and design attended by calligraphers and graphic designer all over U.S., Canada, Asia and Europe and has taught and lectured at institutions including Cooper Union, New York City, Sunderland University and Imperial College, London.

In 2006 Waters was the keynote speaker at *Letterforum*, part of the 26th International Calligraphy Conference, at James Madison University.

== Private-sector works ==
Waters has worked on logos, posters, CD packaging, titling for books and publications. He has designed titling lettering for National Geographic Magazine for over 20 years. He is the only lettering designer to have been featured in a "Behind the Scenes" full page photo profile in the Magazine late 1999.

He has been featured on TV in the U.S. and Europe, including the Emmy Award-winning segment entitled "Man of Letters", on the Sunday morning magazine show, Capital Edition, 1989.

In 1997 Adobe Systems released his Multiple Master typeface "Waters Titling".

== Public works ==
Waters produced lettering for books, posters and stamps for the U.S. Postal Service, including "Bill of Rights" and "Presidential Libraries" stamps, "Love" envelope and "Legends of American Music" series.

During the construction of the Vietnam Veterans Memorial in Washington DC, Waters was a typographic advisor to Maya Lin. He was the typographic designer for the Women in Military Service for America Memorial at Arlington Cemetery.

== Awards ==
Waters has received awards from the Type Directors Club, Art Directors Club, Print Magazine and Letter Arts Review Annual. He was the 1997 Rubenstein Memorial Guest Artist at the Sidwell Friends School, Washington DC.
