= Conservation and restoration of parchment =

Preservation of heritage collections

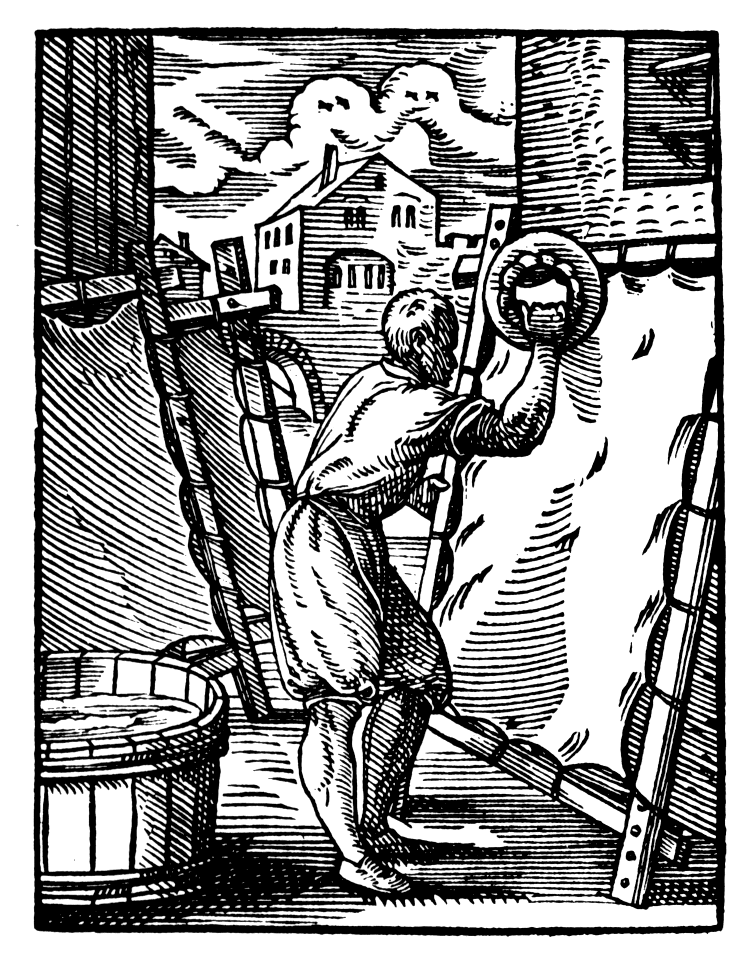
Illustration of a German parchmenter from 1568

The conservation and restoration of parchment constitutes the care and treatment of parchment materials which have cultural and historical significance. Typically undertaken by professional book and document conservators, this process can include preventive measures which protect against future deterioration as well as specific treatments to alleviate changes already caused by agents of deterioration.

== Parchment manufacturing and properties ==
The making of parchment in the Netherlands

Parchment is the skin of an animal, usually sheep, calf or goat, which has been dehaired, processed with a lime solution and stretched under tension. The dried material is a thin membrane which is most commonly used as a writing surface, but can also be used to make other items like bookbindings and drumheads. Throughout Europe, parchment was the primary writing substrate from its development in the 2nd century BCE through the Middle Ages, though it is used through the present day for various official documents. Typically parchment made from calfskin is called vellum, though the term can also be used to refer to very fine quality parchment made from the skins of other animals. For the purposes of conservation and restoration, the term parchment is used in reference to vellum objects, as the terms have been used interchangeably throughout time to refer to objects with the same conservation concerns.

Parchment has unique structural qualities which differentiate it from paper-based materials. Typically, parchment is resistant to mechanical damage like tears or creasing, though it is easily susceptible to damage from mold and high temperatures. Parchment is also highly hygroscopic in nature, meaning that changes in relative humidity can cause irreversible variations to its structural makeup. These specific qualities dictate the conservation and restoration treatments required for parchment.

=== Physical and chemical properties ===
Most skins used for parchment are 1–3 mm in thickness before processing. Animal skin used for parchment all has the same basic structure, with slight variations due to the species, age and diet of the specific animal. Skin is composed of innumerable fibrils made up of the protein collagen, which are held in bundles that interweave in a three dimensional manner through the skin. The fibrous material is composed of many long chain molecules of collagen, which can react with certain environmental factors. One universal property of collagen is that it exhibits sudden shrinkage when heated in water, starting at 65 °C (149 °F). Prolonged exposure to alkali, like in parchment liming process, changes the amino acids, consequently dropping shrinkage temperatures as low as 55 °C (131 °F).

=== Manufacturing ===
Once it is removed from the animal, the skin is temporarily preserved, either by drying or liberal application of salt, until it can be processed. The skin is then immersed in water for 48 hours, which cleans and rehydrates it. This step also removes the non-collagenous materials, like hyaluronic acid, dermaten sulphate and plasma proteins. The skin is then soaked in a lime or alkali solution, known as the liming process. In the 19th century, chemicals were added to speed up the liming process, which resulted in weaker parchments. These added compounds sometimes reacted to produce gypsum, giving the parchment a characteristic gray hue. The skin is then stretched in suspension on a frame, constricting it as it dries. This ensures even contraction across the entire parchment which ensures that it will remain flat when dried. After being prepared, parchment is sometimes coated so that it is more receptive to pigment and ink. Historical coatings, which include chalk, egg whites and matte paint, must be taken into consideration as a meaningful part of the preservation and conservation plan.

The manufacturing process, which removes the skin's natural fats and oils, means that parchment is more reactive to moisture and relative humidity than other skin-based material. After being stretched, parchment has an inherent desire to revert to its original animal shape, especially if left unrestrained or exposed to repeated changes in relative humidity.

=== Identification ===
Parchment is usually positively identified by sight, sometimes with the assistance of a hand lens or microscope. Visible hair follicle pattern, veining, scars, bruises and sometimes fat deposits all help confirm the animal origin of the material. Additional light sources including ultraviolet lights, can make these properties more easily identifiable.

Sometimes visual examination is not sufficient to distinguish parchment from certain types of highly calendered papers. Misidentification of these materials can lead to inappropriate preservation methods or conservation treatments. Analytical testing, which involves removing a small piece of parchment, can be done by or under the supervision of a professional conservator-restorer to ensure positive identification. One type of analytical testing involves examining the parchment specimen under a light microscope or scanning electron microscopy. A simple flame test can also be done on the parchment specimen; true parchment will emit the meaty smell of burned protein, while other look-alike materials will smell like paper or wood.

== Agents of deterioration ==
- Relative humidity changes

Changes in relative humidity can cause parchment to change shape, especially if movement is restrained by a frame or mount at certain parts of the object, which leads to uneven distortion. This distortion can result in cockling and destabilization of any pigments affixed to the parchment. Low humidity levels can cause parchment to desiccate.

- Water and excessive moisture

Direct water contact and excessive moisture in the environment can cause structural problems for parchment including: expansion of object; discoloration; alteration of surface coatings; gelatinization of skin; and realignment of fibers.

- Oxygen

Atmospheric oxygen reacts with the chemical composition of parchment, which subsequently changes the physical properties of the object over time.

- Mold

Mold is a probable consequence of water damage to parchment, especially when the object is not dried within 48 hours of the initial contact with water.

- Heat:

Heat in excess of the ideal storage conditions can cause damage to collagen structure, irreversible contraction and alteration of surface materials in parchment objects.

- Light exposure

Lower wavelength and ultraviolet light lead to degradation of the collagen structure and photodiscoloration, usually causing yellowing of parchment. Parchment exposed to UV light can also have a photochemical reaction causing it to become brittle.

- Flaking and friability

Consolidation of media on parchment, such as those found in illuminated manuscripts, is compromised by the instability of the parchment substrate. Excessive flexing or chemical changes in the parchment can lead to loss of pigment and text.

- Poor storage

Parchment which has been adhered to a rigid mount for storage or display is unable to expand and contract, as its natural tendency. This poor storage technique can lead to tears, perforations and loss. Parchment stored in an unregulated and inconsistent environment is more susceptible to damage.

== Storage and preventive care ==
Proper storage environments can help ward off structural, chemical and environmental changes which affects the long-term preservation of parchment. Storage factors must take into account the factors of the particular parchment object, including its condition, age, storage history and plans for use. Illuminated manuscripts and composite parchment objects, which may include seals and ribbons, may have additional storage needs. A consistent storage environment is crucial for the long-term stability of parchment, which is especially vulnerable to changes in humidity, temperature and other environmental factors.

Microenvironments are less expensive ways to provide consistent storage environments for parchment if the external storage conditions are not ideal. Moisture sensitive parchments can be stored in a Plexiglas sandwich by inserting the matted parchment between two sheets of acrylic and taping off all sides. Parchment can also be stored in envelopes constructed out of polyester sheets.

For the long-term preservation of organic material like parchment, the ideal temperature range is 10–15 °C (50–59 °F) with a relative humidity level of 30–50%. The ideal storage and display environment is oxygen-free, as oxygen prevalence has been shown to react with collagen over time, leading to increased brittleness of parchment. Oxygen-free storage and display cases are filled with inert gas as well as a chemical substance that reacts as an absorber if any stray oxygen leaks into the encasement.

== Ethical concerns of conservation ==
The American Institute for Conservation's Code of Ethics and Guidelines for Practice set forth the conduct for conservation and restoration treatments of parchment objects. The hazards of specific treatments need to be weighed against the benefits, as many traditional liquid-based conservation techniques can pose risks to parchment.

== Conservation treatments ==
=== Removal of previous restorations ===
Previous repairs and conservation treatments are removed if it is determined that the parchment is in good condition and that the repair is not of historic importance to the parchment. Dried out patches are removed via cleaning and humidification techniques. Parchment objects that have been attached to mounts are removed with a sharpened lifting tool and a small amount of moisture. Previous laminations, like Goldbeater's skin and Mipofolie, can sometimes be removed with solvents and mechanical techniques, though this removal technique can risk additional damage to the original parchment.

=== Cleaning ===
Surface cleaning of parchment has been developed after methods used for cleaning paper, with a few key differences related to the structural and chemical properties of parchment. For the most part, chemical treatments are ineffective and some, like hypochlorites and methyl bromide, can denaturalize parchment. Prior to cleaning, any flaking or vulnerable media is consolidated to ensure it does not detach from the parchment substrate. Consolidation of parchment media is undertaken by applying various dilute adhesives like isinglass, gelatin or parchment size through brush application or by the use of an ultrasonic humidification apparatus.

If their presence is determined upon examination, insects and pests are eliminated and the parchment disinfected. An appropriate round of fumigation in an autoclave is used to remove pests and sterilize the object. Dry and wet cleaning techniques can both be used effectively on parchment objects. Mechanical cleaning using erasers and other abrasive tools is used to remove mildew and dirt. Surface cleaning of parchment is typically completed using white vinyl erasers (solid and grated) and confined to areas where no media is present. Water baths, which sometimes use neutral detergents or alcohol as additives, can be used to clean as well as prepare the parchment for stretching as part of the conservation process. Another wet cleaning method, which is especially useful for removing mold and mildew, uses a cotton swab covered in fluid, usually denatured alcohol, ethanol or saliva. Laser cleaning may provide a non-contact cleaning process, though conservation labs throughout Europe still mostly use traditional wet and dry cleaning methods for parchment.

=== Humidification ===
Humidification is a parchment conservation treatment which involves the controlled and monitored increase in relative humidity. Humidified parchments are more flexible, which will allow for corrections to distortions like cockling, puckering and changes in original size. Some methods of humidification are: humidification chambers: moisture chambers with ultrasonic humidifier, moisture chambers with steam/ultrasonic mist; and application of alcohol and water. Localized humidification is sometimes used to treat specific folds or creases in parchment objects.

=== Flattening, tensioning and drying ===
After humidification, drying techniques are necessary to ensure that the parchment lays flat and does not suffer additional moisture-related issues. The specific method is dependent on the condition of the object, as well as the humidification process utilized. Some of the most common methods include:

- Drying and flattening under pressure, often pressed between two absorbent surfaces
- Tensioning at the edges, where the parchment is constricted at the edges with weights or clips. This techniques most closely reflects parchment's original manufacturing process.
- Stretch drying on Terylene
- Vacuum suction table flattening

Localized creases are eased with a solution of 80% to 90% isopropyl alcohol and water, which is applied to the creases directly with a cotton swab and then gently pulled flat by hand. The alcohol–water mixture is azeotropic, meaning both components evaporate simultaneously. The solution has a lower surface tension than just water, which causes the fibers to suffer less shrinkage.

=== Mending and in-filling losses ===
Sewing tears is not recommended as a conservation treatment, unless it is replacing a sewn portion original to the object. Correcting non-original splits, tears, perforations and losses in parchment requires careful consideration of its specific condition. For losses that do not require much support, transparent membranes, such as fish skin or sausage casing, are placed over the damaged area with an adhesive. Infill materials, including new parchment, reconstituted parchment and Japanese paper, are used to repair losses requiring greater structural support. All infill materials have some conservation concerns, as they will react differently to environmental factors than the original parchment.

- New parchment: It is difficult to match the infill material to the original parchment type in terms of animal, thickness and appearance. Modern parchments that appear visually similar also respond differently to humidity fluctuations, causing potential problems after the conservation treatment. Parchment infills are matched by thinning them to the appropriate size and bevelling the original parchment before the repair.
- Japanese paper: Paper is dissimilar to parchment in both appearance and behavior, which can pose the future issue of storing an object with composite materials. Paper infills can be toned with watercolor or acrylic paints to better match the original parchment appearance. Acrylic-toned papers are treated with various adhesives such as B-72, Aquazol, or PVA to mimic the translucency of the surrounding parchment. Varying layers of application are used to best approximate the thickness and condition of the specific original parchment.
- Reconstituted parchment: Collagen fibers and dry cellulose materials are mixed together with liquid ingredients to create a pulp-like substance. This material is applied to the original parchment in a process similar to leafcasting paper.

=== Disaster recovery ===
Parchment which has been accidentally exposed to excess moisture or water is extremely susceptible to mold, mechanical damage and irreversible dimensional changes. Emergencies often affect large quantities of objects, therefore the mass treatment of objects usually includes freezing or freeze-drying as the first step. As time permits, parchment object are then thawed and dried using more traditional measures.

== Case studies ==
=== Charters of Freedom ===
The United States Declaration of Independence, Constitution and the Bill of Rights, collectively known as the Charters of Freedom, were housed in metal and glass encasements, filled with helium gas, from 1952 to 2001. In 1951, the National Bureau of Standards reported that an inert gas environment would be the best means of preserving the Charters of Freedom. In 1982, the National Archives and Records Administration partnered with the Jet Propulsion Laboratory on a nine-year project which determined that the encasement glass was deteriorating. Upon the issuing of this report, it was decided that new encasements and conservation treatments were needed for the long-term preservation of the Charters of Freedom. The documents were thoroughly examined for signs of deterioration and past restorations, all of which were thoroughly documented in condition reports.

The first step of treatment stabilized the ink of the text using a gelatin adhesive. The dirt and grime were then cleaned from the parchments, though original intentional marks were left alone. The Constitution and the Bill of Rights were then humidified and dried under tension to flatten the parchments. The Declaration of Independence, which has been damaged by frequent handling and exposure, was not humidified because of its increased moisture sensitivity. All the parchments were then installed into new titanium and aluminum encasements, developed by the National Institute of Standards and Technology, which are filled with inert argon gas. The current environmental conditions of the Charters of Freedom encasements is monitored by scientists and conservators for signs of possible deterioration agents.

=== Canterbury Magna Carta ===
In 1731, one of four surviving copies of the 1215 Magna Carta, known as the Canterbury Magna Carta, was partially damaged in a fire at its temporary storage location at Ashburnham House. Damage included shrinkage and discoloration of the parchment substrate, though the ink text was still legible. In the 1830s, British Museum staff attempted a restoration, using chemicals to treat the parchment and unintentionally rendering the text illegible.

In 2014, the British Library undertook a multispectral imaging project to determine if the text on the damaged document could be recovered. Analysis under ultraviolet light allowed scientists and conservators to see text that was invisible to the naked eye. This new technology allows the document to be used for continued research purposes, despite the previous botched restoration.
