= Mary Selway =

English casting director (1936–2004)

- Mary Selway with British Academy Award (2001)
- Born: 14 March 1936; Norwich, England
- Died: 21 April 2004 (aged 68); London, England
- Occupation: Casting director
- Children: 2

Mary Selway (14 March 1936 – 21 April 2004) was an English casting director.

== Life ==
Selway was born in Norwich in 1936, daughter of a cinema manager and impresario. At the age of 13 she enrolled at the Italia Conti Academy of Theatre Arts in London to study acting. By 19 she had decided not to become an actress, and went to work as a production assistant at ITV before starting to work in casting, first under Miriam Brickman and then, from 1969, under Lindsay Anderson at the Royal Court Theatre in London. By the age of 34 she had started casting films, which she continued for the rest of her life.

== Career ==
Selway worked with a number of directors over three decades, including Steven Spielberg, Roman Polanski, Clint Eastwood, John Boorman, Sydney Pollack, Robert Altman, Michael Apted, Nicolas Roeg, Fred Schepisi, Fred Zinnemann, and Ridley Scott. She was responsible for the casting of 104 films. Selway sought new acting talent by watching films from around the world and attending fringe theatre performances. She also supported actors she had discovered and remained in contact with cast members throughout the shooting process.At the 2001 BAFTA Awards, she received the Michael Balcon Award for Outstanding British Contribution to Cinema.

A biographical documentary entitled A Cast of Thousands: The Life of Mary Selway is being produced in celebration of her life. It is directed by Isabelle Gregson, who explained that it aims "in its own small way to give those who didn't have the pleasure of knowing her, a taste for her enormous contribution to Cinema through the eyes and words of those who knew and loved her."

The British Academy of Film and Television Arts (BAFTA) Orange Rising Star Award for the best young actor is dedicated to the memory of Mary Selway. Selway's death in 2004 is acknowledged by a memorium at the end credits of the movie Harry Potter and the Goblet of Fire.

== Films (selection) ==
She directed the casting of many well-known films, including:

- Alien (1979)
- Outland (1981)
- Raiders of the Lost Ark (1981)
- Trail of the Pink Panther (1982)
- Return of the Jedi (1983)
- Curse of the Pink Panther (1983)
- Indiana Jones and the Temple of Doom (1984)
- Top Secret! (1984)
- Aliens (1986)
- Withnail and I (1987)
- Gorillas in the Mist (1988)
- The Russia House (1990)
- King Ralph (1991)
- First Knight (1995)
- The Ghost and the Darkness (1996)
- Lost in Space (1998)
- Notting Hill (1999)
- Captain Corelli's Mandolin (2001)
- Enigma (2001)
- Gosford Park (2001)
- K-19: The Widowmaker (2002)
- The Sleeping Dictionary (2003)
- Love Actually (2003)
- Master and Commander: The Far Side of the World (2003)
- The Chronicles of Riddick (2004)
- Thunderbirds (2004)
- Enduring Love (2004)
- Vanity Fair (2004)
- The Libertine (2004)
- Harry Potter and the Goblet of Fire (2005)

== Personal life ==
Selway was married to the actor Norman Rodway in January 1966. The couple parted a few years later. She had two daughters with her partner of nineteen years, the actor Keith Buckley: the agent Kate Buckley and the actress Emma Buckley. During her last fourteen years her partner was Ileen Maisel. Selway died of cancer in London, aged 68.

It was at Selway's funeral that the funeral organiser, Eon Productions film producer Barbara Broccoli, met actor Daniel Craig in person for the first time. Broccoli invited Craig to visit her office, where she offered him the iconic role of James Bond.
