= Candace Glendenning =

British actress (born 1953)

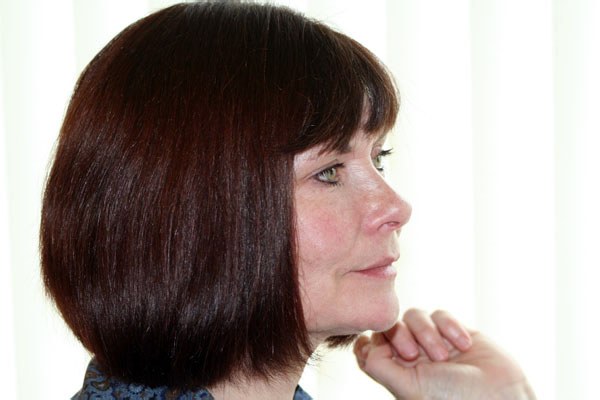
- Glendenning in 2006
- Born: 9 August 1953 (age 72); London, England
- Other name: Candy Glendenning / Candice Glendenning
- Occupation: Actress
- Years active: 1968–1982
- Known for: The Tyrant King; Nicholas and Alexandra; Tower of Evil; Satan's Slave; Ripping Yarns; Blake's 7

Candace Glendenning (born 9 August 1953) is a retired English actress, known for her work in the horror film genre in the 1970s as a "scream queen". She also had a career in British television throughout the late 1960s to the early 1980s.

== Career ==
Glendenning began her career as a child actress in The Tyrant King in 1968 and made her final feature film appearance in the 1976 independent horror film, Satan's Slave. This turned out to be her biggest starring role, an independent and spirited young woman who, having been orphaned in a car accident, is taken in by necromancer relatives who intend to use her as a human sacrifice. Glendenning's performance was well received by critics, but the film itself garnered mixed reviews and failed to turn a profit.

She continued to steadily work in television roles throughout the 1970s. In 1980, she appeared on five episodes of the BBC series Flesh and Blood, in which she played an elegant secretary. She was also reunited with Michael Jayston, who had played her father in Nicholas and Alexandra nearly ten years before. Glendenning's last role was a guest spot in a 1982 episode of the medical drama series, Angels.

== Filmography ==
- The Prime of Miss Jean Brodie (1969) as Schoolgirl
- Up Pompeii (1971) as Stone Girl
- Nicholas and Alexandra (1971) as Maria
- Tower of Evil (1972) as Penelope "Penny" Read
- The Flesh and Blood Show (1972) as Sarah
- Diamonds on Wheels (1974) as Elizabeth
- Satan's Slave (1976) as Catherine York

== Television appearances ==
- The Tyrant King (6 episodes, 1968)
- The Expert (1 episode, 1971)
- The Main Chance (1 episode, 1972)
- The Strauss Family (1 episode, 1972)
- BBC Play of the Month (2 episodes, 1972–73)
- Dixon of Dock Green (1 episode, 1975)
- Looking For Clancy (1 episode, 1975)
- Disneyland (3 episodes, 1974)
- Ten from the Twenties (1 episode, 1975)
- Play for Today (1 episode, 1976)
- Scene (2 episodes, 1976)
- Ripping Yarns (1 episode, 1977)
- Rainbow (1 episode, 1977)
- Blake's 7 (1 episode, 1979)
- Flesh and Blood (6 episodes, 1980–82)
- Angels (1 episode, 1982)
