= The Tyrant King =

Television series

The Tyrant King is a six-part children's serial drama directed by Mike Hodges, made by ABC Weekend TV and screened by Thames Television in 1968. Based on the book of the same name by Aylmer Hall, it was adapted for television by Trevor Preston. It was notable for its use of a progressive music soundtrack, including music from The Rolling Stones, The Moody Blues, Cream, Pink Floyd, and in particular, The Nice, whose song "The Thoughts of Emerlist Davjack", from the album of the same name was the title track.

The series was shot entirely on film, as opposed to videotape, and almost entirely on location throughout London, United Kingdom; it served as the pilot project for what became Thames' TV film production unit Euston Films.

== Story ==
The story begins with three children overhearing a mysterious conversation, leading them to follow the clues across the tourist attractions of London.

== Cast ==
- Murray Melvin (Uncle Gerry)
- Candace Glendenning (Charlotte) - credited as Candy Glendenning
- Edward McMurray (Bill Hallen) - credited as Eddie McMurray
- Kim Fortune (Peter Thorne)
- Philip Madoc (Scarface)

The credits note that the three juvenile leads are "Pupils of Italia Conti Stage School."

== Soundtrack ==
Tracks include:

- The Thoughts of Emerlist Davjack (The Nice)
- Tantalising Maggie (The Nice)
- Astronomy Domine (Pink Floyd)
- Dr. Livingstone, I Presume (The Moody Blues)
- As You Said (Cream)
- A Saucerful of Secrets (Pink Floyd)
- She's a Rainbow (The Rolling Stones)
