= Jarvis baronets =

Extinct baronetcy in the Baronetage of the United Kingdom

The Jarvis Baronetcy, of Hascombe Court in the County of Surrey, was a title in the Baronetage of the United Kingdom. It was created on 24 January 1922 for John Jarvis.

His son, Sir Arnold Adrian Jarvis, 2nd Baronet, lived at Admiral's Walk, a country house in Pirbright, near Guildford, in Surrey, with his wife Joan. He died in 1965, leaving no heir after which the barony became extinct. The house was subsequently offered for sale by Chancellors in Country Life who described it as "well-known and expensively built".

== Jarvis baronets, of Hascombe Court (1922) ==
- Sir John Jarvis, 1st Baronet (1876–1950)
- Sir Arnold Adrian Jarvis, 2nd Baronet (1904–1965)
