= Ivan Blinov =

Russian painter

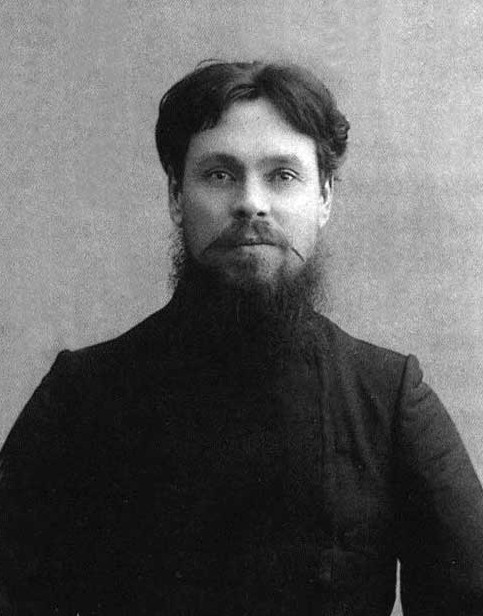
- Photo, 1914
- Born: Ivan Gavrilovich Blinov; 5 (18) November 1872; Kudashikha, Bolshepesoshninskaya Volost, Balakhninsky Uyezd, Nizhny Novgorod Governorate, Russian Empire
- Died: 8 June 1944 (aged 71); Kudashikha, Gorodetsky District, Gorky Oblast, USSR
- Citizenship: Russian
- Education: Self-education
- Known for: Calligraphy, painting, bookmaking
- Notable work: The Tale of Peter and Fevronia of Murom (1900, 1901), The Tale of Igor's Campaign, The Akathist to St. Seraphim of Sarov, The Canon to the Holy Cross, The history of Gorodets-town
- Movement: Russian Medieval Style; Historicism

Ivan Gavrilovich Blinov (Russian: Иван Гаврилович Блинов; November 5 (O.S.)/18 (N.S.), 1872, in Kudashikha, Bolshepesoshninskaya Volost, Balakhninsky Uyezd, Nizhny Novgorod Governorate, Russian Empire – June 8, 1944, in ibidem, Gorodetsky District, Gorky Oblast, USSR) was a calligrapher and miniaturist, bookmaking master, who worked in the traditional manner.

Blinov was born to Beglopopovtsy parents and began to copy Old Believers manuscripts as a teenager. In 1905-1906 he was commissioned by the Nizhny Novgorod city council to study manuscript writing at the Solovetsky Monastery. In addition to this he also studied manuscript writing and calligraphy in various Russian museums and libraries.

In 1909-1906 he worked at the Old Believers book publishers that belonged to L.A. Malekhonov, where Blinov oversaw publication of several important books and reprints. He also worked on private commissions, and among his clients were the House of Romanov, Russian Historical Museum and the Rumyantsev Museum. In 1916 Blinov was drafted to a military hospital. In 1919 Blinov became a member of the scholarly board of the Russian Historical Museum.

In 1925 Blinov was forced to return to his home village due to family circumstances. In 1920-1930 he worked various jobs, was a member of a collective farm and continued to work on religious manuscripts as a hobby, while remaining under suspicion with the new secular government.

Blinov created almost 200 manuscript books, most of them containing various religious texts. He also worked on preservation of several important manuscripts. In addition to this Blinov is known as a book illustrator, a graphic artist and a painter.

== Published works ==
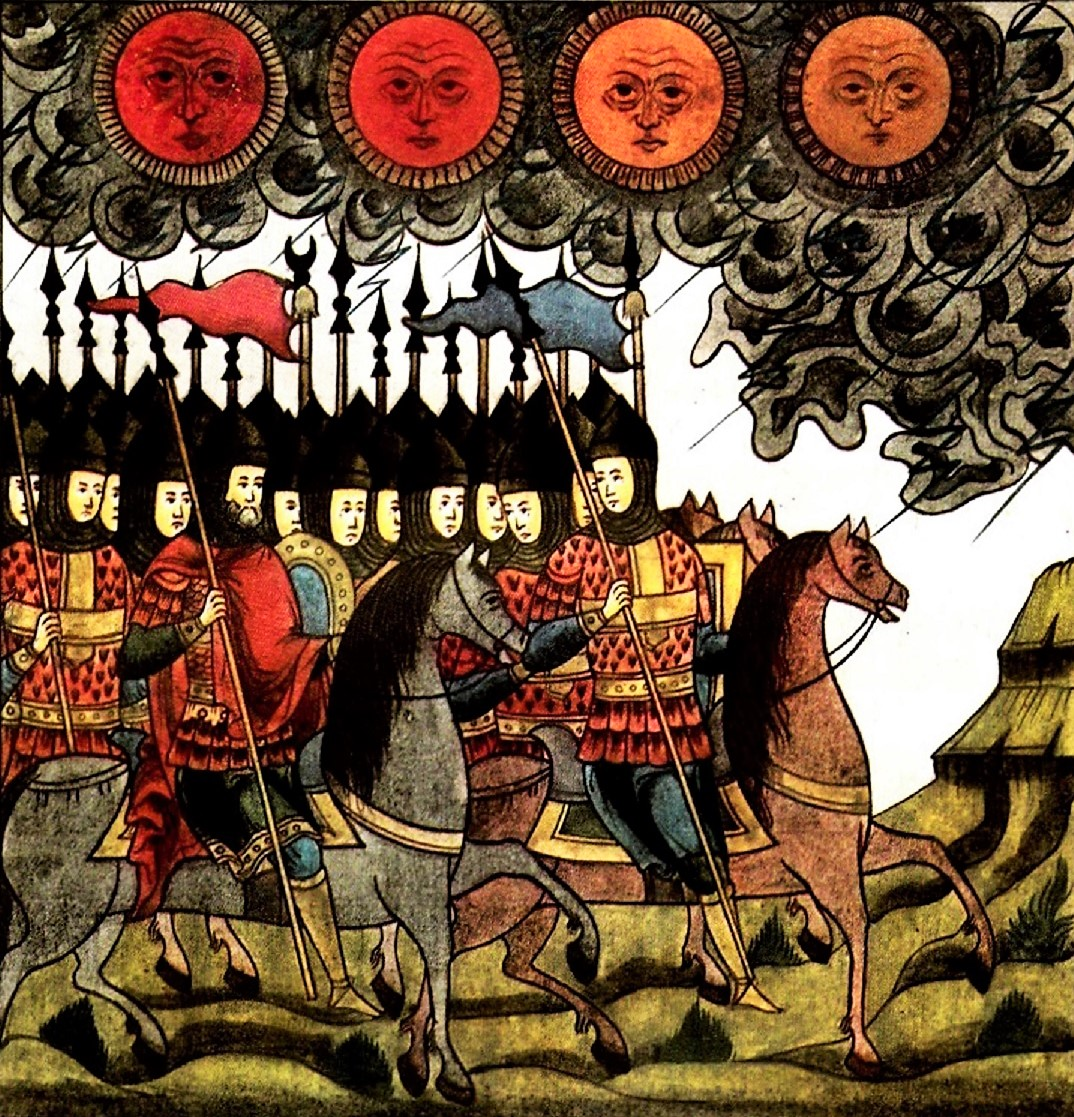
Illustration by Ivan Blinov for his 1912 edition of The Tale of Igor's Campaign, the first such illustrated copy of the work.

1. Сказание о князе Михаиле Черниговском и о его боярине Феодоре: Факсимильное воспроизведение лицевого списка из собрания ГИМ / Пер. с древрус. и прил. И. В. Левочкина. М., 1988.

2. Слово о полку Игореве: Факсимильное воспроизведение лицевого списка работы И. Г. Блинова из собрания ГБЛ / Л. А. Дмитриев, Н. К. Гаврюшин, В. П. Гребенюк, И. И. Шкляревский. М., 1988.

3. Покровители семьи и брака святые Петр и Феврония Муромские / Издание выполнено по рукописи Государственного исторического музея: Повесть о Петре и Февронии Муромских. Художник и писец И. Г. Блинов. 1901 г. / Сост., пер. и вступ. ст. Е. М. Юхименко. М., 2012.

== Bibliography ==
- Аксенова Г. В. Живописные сокровища из Городца // Московский журнал. История государства Российского. М., 2003. № 9. С. 2–7.
- Аксенова Г. В. И. Г. Блинов – городецкий книгописец и изограф // Городецкая старина. Вып. 3. Городец, 1997.
- Аксенова Г. В. Книжных дел мастер Иван Блинов // Московский журнал. История государства Российского. М., 2003. № 11. С. 4–9.
- Аксенова Г. В. Русская книжная культура на рубеже XIX – XX веков. М., 2011. С. 148–173.
- Белоброва О. А. Блинов Иван Гаврилович // Энциклопедия "Слова о полку Игореве". Т. 1: А – В. М., 1995. С. 123.
- Иткина Е. И. Памятники Куликовского цикла в творчестве художника-миниатюриста И. Г. Блинова // Куликовская битва в истории и культуре нашей Родины. М., 1983. С. 216–224.
- Иткина Е. И. Русский рисованный лубок конца XVIII – начала XX века из собрания Государственного Исторического музея. М., 1992. С. 13–15, 22–24, 222–224.
- Рыков Ю. Д. Блинов Иван Гаврилович // Православная энциклопедия. Т. 5. М., 2002. С. 359–361.
- Сироткин С. В. Из рукописного наследия И. Г. Блинова // Городецкие чтения: Материалы научно-практической конференции 23 – 24 апреля 2004 г. Вып. 5. Городец, 2004. С. 43–45.
- Юхименко Е. М. Иван Гаврилович Блинов – крестьянин, книгописец, художник // Искусствознание. 2013. №№ 1 – 2. С. 423-443.
- Gudkov, A. G. (2015). Ivan Gavrilovich Blinov, knizhnykh del master iz Gorodt͡sa [Ivan Gavrilovich Blinov, a book master from Gorodets] (in Russian). Kolomna: Liga. ISBN 9785989320530.
