= Aylmer Hall =

- Born: Norah Eleanor Lyle Cummins; 24 April 1914
- Died: 14 June 1987 (aged 73)
- Occupation: author
- Spouse: Robert Aylmer Hall

Aylmer Hall was the pen name of Norah Eleanor Lyle Cummins (born 24 April 1914). She was the author of adventure stories for children written in the 1950s and 1960s. Her book The Tyrant King - A London Adventure was published by London Transport in 1967 with illustrations by Peter Roberson. The book inspired the TV series of the same name, directed by Mike Hodges.

== Biography ==
Hall was educated at St. Hugh's College, Oxford University where she earned a B.A. Honours in modern languages in 1935. She worked as an assistant secretary in 1936, and then went on to become a librarian at the Royal Institute of International Affairs from 1937 to 1939. From 1939 to 1940, she worked as a press librarian in the Ministry of Information. Hall married Robert Aylmer Hall on 8 October 1938. In addition to being a writer, Hall was also a historian.

== Work ==
The Daily Herald in Chicago wrote that The Search for Lancelot's Sword (1960) is a "well told mystery story." Kirkus Reviews wrote that her book about 1765 Ireland, Beware of Moonlight (1970) had stereotyped characters and was "rambling, complicated and filled with hackneyed class-conscious poses." Myles McDowell puts many of Hall's books into the "Boys' Own" era, and writes that these can seem dated to modern readers.

== Works ==
Hall wrote ten books, most of them historical adventures, though some had contemporary settings.

- The Mystery of Torland Manor (1952)
- The Admiral's Secret (1953)
- The K.F. Conspiracy (1955)
- The Sword of Glendower (1960) or The Search for Lancelot's Sword
- The Devilish Plot (1965)
- The Marked Man (1967)
- The Tyrant King (1967)
- Colonel Bull's Inheritance (1968)
- Beware of Moonlight (1969 or 70)
- The Minstrel Boy (1970)
