= Keith Buckley (actor) =

English actor (1941–2020)

- Keith Buckley in the film Virgin Witch (1972)
- Born: 7 April 1941; Huddersfield, West Riding of Yorkshire, England
- Died: 1 December 2020 (aged 79)
- Occupation: Actor
- Spouse: Bella Buckley (m. 1959; div. 1967)
- Partner(s): Mary Selway; Beverly Lowry
- Children: 4

Keith Buckley (7 April 1941 – 1 December 2020) was an English actor who mostly appeared on television and films from 1958.

== Career ==
Keith Buckley was born on 7 April 1941 in Huddersfield, West Riding of Yorkshire and performed in school plays at Huddersfield College. He had many appearances in film and television, including The Avengers and Randall and Hopkirk in the 1960s and The New Avengers in the 1970s.

== Personal life ==
Between the years 1959 and 1967, Keith Buckley was married to Bella Buckley, with whom he had two daughters. After that, he was in a partnership for 19 years with the casting director Mary Selway, with whom he also had two daughters. In later years, he lived in the US with author Beverly Lowry before returning home to live in the UK. He died in December 2020 at the age of 79.

== Selected filmography ==
- Shadow of the Boomerang (1960) – Stockman
- King and Country (1964) – Corporal of Guard
- Attack on the Iron Coast (1968) – Commando No1 (uncredited)
- Alfred the Great (1969) – Hadric
- Spring and Port Wine (1970) – Arthur Gasket
- Wuthering Heights (1970)
- The Go-Between (1971) – Stubbs
- The Pied Piper (1972) – Mattio
- Virgin Witch (1972) – Johnny
- Dr. Phibes Rises Again (1972) – Stewart
- The 14 (1973) – Mr. Whitehead
- Trial by Combat (1976) – Herald
- The Eagle Has Landed (1976) – Major Gericke
- The Spy Who Loved Me (1977) – HMS Ranger Crewman
- Hanover Street (1979) – Lieutenant Wells
- Tess (1979) – Postman
- Excalibur (1981) – Uryens
- The Star Chamber (1983) – Assassin
- John Wycliffe: The Morning Star (1984) – John of Gaunt
- Christopher Columbus (1985) – De Torres
- Half Moon Street (1986) – Hugo Van Arkady
- Sky Bandits (1986) – Von Schlussel
- Hawks (1988) – Dutch Doctor
