= Admiral's Walk =

Country house in Pirbright, England

Coordinates: 51.2856°N 0.6548°W

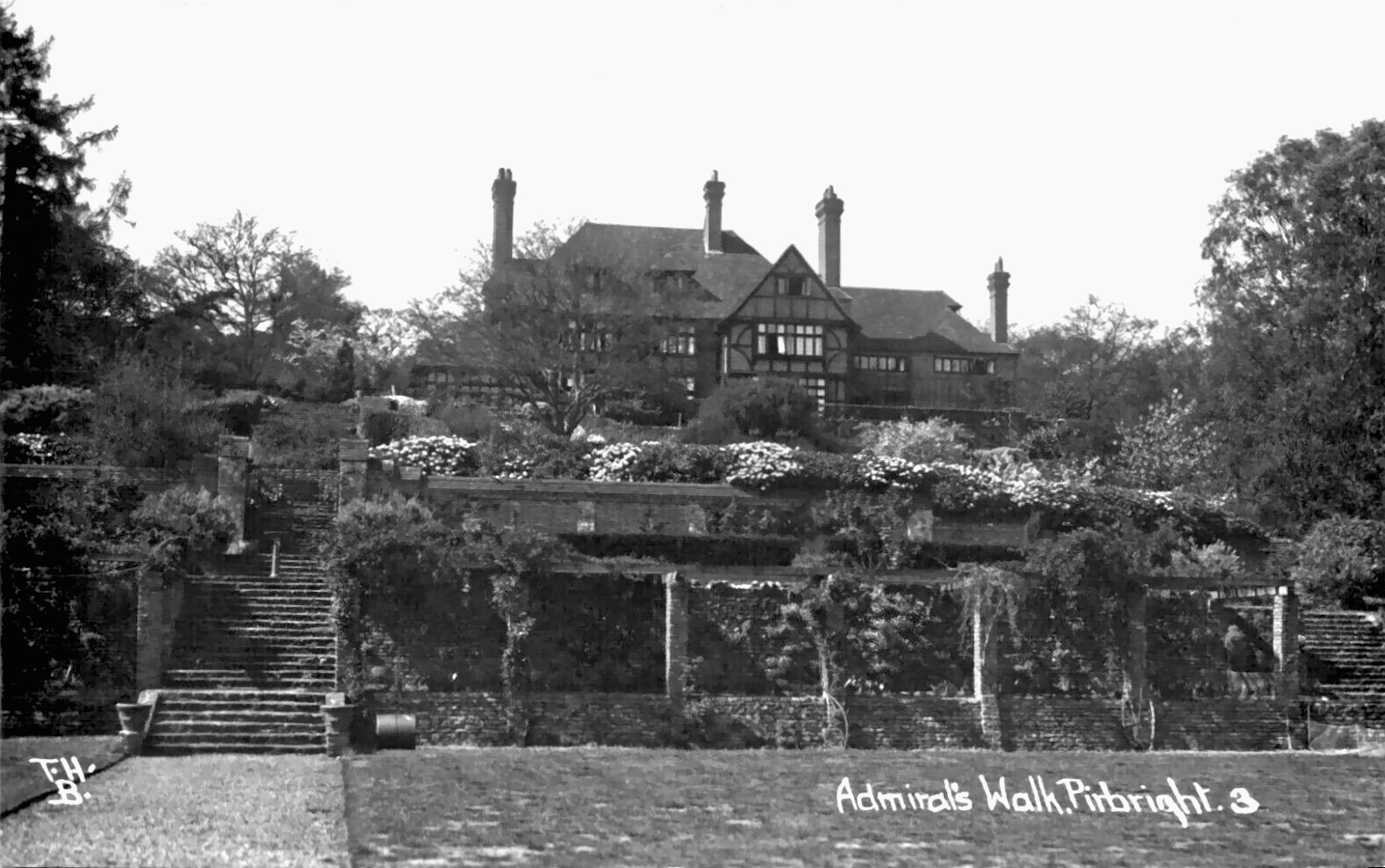
Admiral's Walk and its terraced gardens

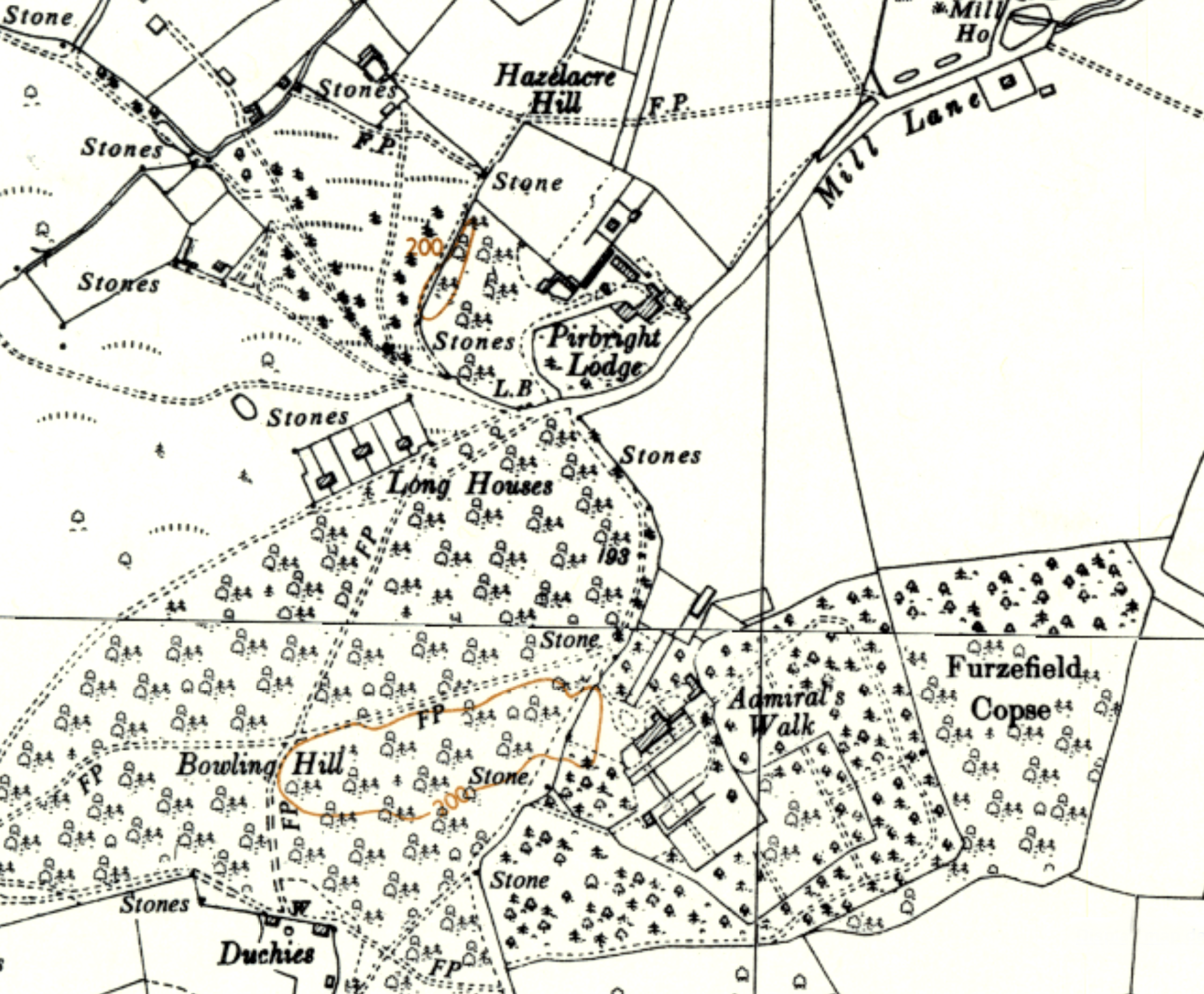
Admiral's Walk on a 1961 map

Admiral's Walk is a mock-Tudor country house in Pirbright, in the county of Surrey, England. It was built in the early 1900s, in the style of an Elizabethan manor house, and named after an avenue of Scots pines planted by the explorer Vice-Admiral John Byron. It stands on high ground within an estate of 33 acres, which in 1966 included 10 acres of formal and terraced gardens. Former residents have included the private solicitor to King George V, Sir Bernard Halsey-Bircham, and the businessman Sir Adrian Jarvis, 2nd Baronet. In the 1970s, it was the principal filming location for three British horror sexploitation films, Virgin Witch, Satan's Slave and Terror.

== Location ==
The house is located on the east side of a private road or track that runs south from Mill Lane in Pirbright, between the grade II listed Pirbright Lodge and the Long Houses. Buttercup Lodge is adjacent to the house and Bowling Hill is on the west side of the track.

== Construction and design ==
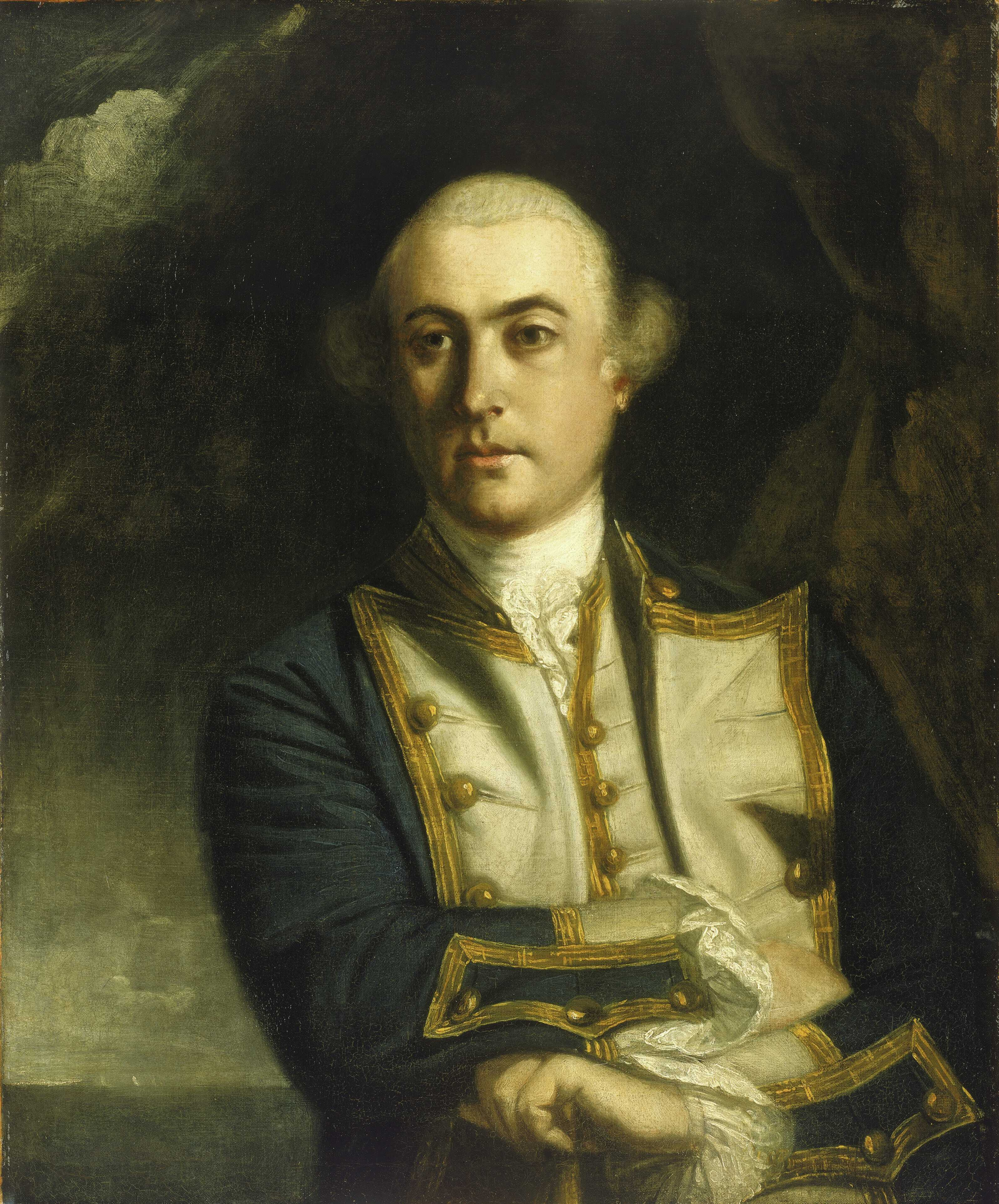
Captain the Honourable John Byron. Joshua Reynolds, oil on canvas, 1759. National Maritime Museum, Greenwich.

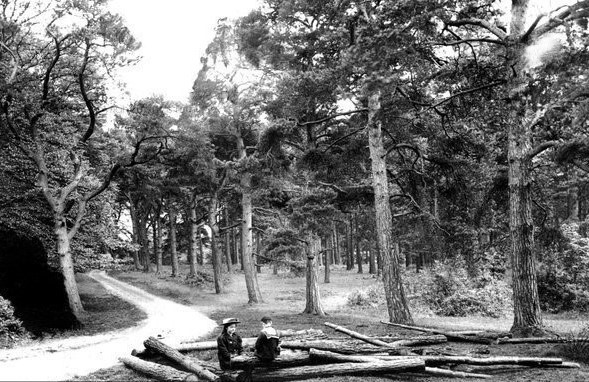
Admiral's Walk, the trees planted by John Byron, seen in 1908

The house was built in the early 1900s on land that was formerly part of Furzefield Copse. It was designed in the style of an Elizabethan manor house in accordance with the Tudor Revival architecture that was then popular. It takes its name from a nearby avenue of Scots pines, known as Admiral's Walk, planted by the explorer Vice-Admiral John Byron (1723–1786) (grandfather of the poet) who lived at Pirbright Lodge. The pines were later felled.

In 1966, when the house was for sale at £45,000, The Times reported that it stood on high ground in an estate of 33 acres, most of which was wooded but with 10 acres of formal and terraced gardens. It had three reception rooms and seven bedrooms as well as staff accommodation. The same year, it was described in an advert by Chancellors in Country Life as "well-known and expensively built".

== Former residents ==
Dame Anne Woodall, widow of Sir Corbet Woodall, lived there until her death in December 1928.

Sir Bernard Halsey-Bircham (died 1945), the private solicitor to King George V from 1922 to 1936 and justice of the peace in Surrey, lived there.

Lady (Peter) Drummond lived there until May 1945.

It was the home of Sir Adrian Jarvis, 2nd Baronet, and his wife Joan (divorced 1945). Sir John Jarvis, 1st Baronet, owned a successful racehorse named Admiral's Walk. The second baronet died there in 1965 leaving no heir, after which the barony became extinct.

Bookbinder William F. Matthews lived at Track End, Admiral's Way, until his death in April 1977.

== Film location ==
Admiral's Walk was the principal location for Virgin Witch, a 1972 British horror sexploitation film directed by Ray Austin. It was also used by director Norman J. Warren, and was the main location for his films Satan's Slave in 1976, and Terror in 1978. Warren later recalled that it was the ideal location for Satan's Slave, which was made on a very tight budget, as it had the necessary eerie Gothic appearance, its own electric substation for power, and was complete with period furniture. The only problem was the noise from the military training nearby which sometimes interfered with shooting, but this also had advantages as the crew were able to obtain permission to film the destruction of a car and leave the wreck for the army to use for target practice. When the movies were filmed, the house was owned by a Baron and Baroness who had relocated from their French chateau with their furniture, but due to financial difficulties were prepared to rent out the house as a film location.
