= Virgin Witch =

1971 British horror sexploitation film by Ray Austin

- US film poster
- Directed by: Ray Austin
- Written by: Hazel Adair (as "Klaus Vogel")
- Produced by: Kent Walton (as "Ralph Solomons")
- Starring: Ann Michelle; Vicki Michelle; Patricia Haines; Neil Hallett; Keith Buckley
- Cinematography: Gerald Moss
- Edited by: Phillip Barnikel
- Music by: Ted Dicks
- Production companies: Tigon British Film Productions; Univista Productions
- Distributed by: Tigon Film Distributors
- Release dates: 1971 (London); January 1972 (United Kingdom)
- Running time: 88 minutes
- Country: United Kingdom
- Language: English

Virgin Witch is a 1971 British horror sexploitation film directed by Ray Austin and starring Ann and Vicki Michelle, Patricia Haines and Neil Hallett. A prospective model and her sister join a coven of white wizards.

The film was shot in 1970 and is copyrighted as a 1971 production. However, censorship problems would mean it was not widely seen until 1972.

== Plot ==
Sisters Christine and Betty run away from home to find work as models. They are given a lift to London by Johnny, a businessman who is instantly attracted to Betty. Christine successfully auditions for unscrupulous modelling agent Sybil Waite and is offered a weekend's work shooting an advert at a house in the country. Betty goes with her.

The modelling job is actually a ploy to initiate Christine into a coven of white wizards led by Sybil and the owner of the house, Gerald Amberley. Christine, who is shown to have psychic ability, willingly undergoes the initiation ritual, during which her virginity is taken by Amberley. Christine's powers create tension between her and Sybil, who practises darker magic and has a predatory sexual interest in her. The conflict escalates when Sybil vows to have Betty initiated into the coven.

Johnny, who has been warned about Sybil's true nature, arrives to take Betty away. However, Christine places him under her control, forcing him to participate in Betty's initiation. During the ritual, Christine wrests control from Sybil by psychically torturing her. Johnny, no longer under Christine's control, takes Betty's virginity. Christine then uses her powers to kill Sybil and take her place as high priestess of the coven.

== Cast ==
- Ann Michelle as Christine
- Vicki Michelle as Betty
- Patricia Haines as Sybil Waite
- Neil Hallett as Gerald Amberley
- Keith Buckley as Johnny
- James Chase as Peter
- Helen Downing as Abby Darke

== Production ==
Virgin Witch was produced by sports commentator Kent Walton (using the pseudonym "Ralph Solomons"), whose other producing credits included The Green Shoes (1968, short) and It's the Only Way to Go (1970, short). Its co-producer was Hazel Adair, co-creator of the UK TV soap opera Crossroads. Adair is credited only as the co-writer of the song "You Go Your Way" (performed by the character Abby Darke), and did not admit to co-producing Virgin Witch until 1975, when she featured in an episode of the BBC's Man Alive about sex films. Her other films included Clinic Exclusive (1971), Can You Keep It Up for a Week? (1974), Keep It Up Downstairs (1976) and Game for Vultures (1979).

The film was shot in Surrey in 1970 and previewed in the December editions of Mayfair and Continental Film Review (in which the title was stated to be "The Virgin Witch"). The country house location, Admiral's Walk in Pirbright, was subsequently used by Norman J. Warren for his films Satan's Slave (1976) and Terror (1978).

The Michelle sisters have disowned the film. Vicki's website makes no mention of it, while Ann's refers to it as "not an experience Ann cares to remember".

== Release ==
Although it was rejected by the British Board of Film Censors (BBFC) in April 1971, the film was granted an X certificate by the Greater London Council for a limited release in the capital. The BBFC eventually relented and passed a cut version for general release in January 1972.

The 1990s video releases on the Redemption and Salvation labels are uncut, as are the current UK and US DVD releases. Glamour model Teresa May appeared on the cover of the 1993 UK video release of the film on the Redemption label. (She also modelled for the cover of their video release of Baron Blood and the never-issued release of Don't Deliver Us From Evil.)

=== Critical reception ===
In The Monthly Film Bulletin, Nigel Andrews wrote: "Resourcefully directed sex-and-horror movie which for once gives the illusion of telling a coherent story rather than stitching together a random collection of erotic and macabre set-pieces. Director Ray Austin (a former stuntman) establishes a sinister sexual tension in the early scenes between Christine and Sybil Waite, and some stylish cutting and sound effects make an impressive Gothic climax of the final torchlit initiation. Indeed, throughout the film the erotic and the sinister elements are blended effectively enough to make one overlook the usual quota of sex-film inanities (a feeble script, pneumatic but lifeless heroines), while Patricia Haines' Sybil provides a splendidly flamboyant study in Lesbian frustration."

In 1994, Mark Kermode and Peter Dean of Sight & Sound described Virgin Witch as an "amusingly dated British horror-cum-skin-flick" with a script "so bad, it's almost good."

According to M. J. Simpson, "[w]hat starts off as a pretty crappy movie picks up towards the end, leaning more towards – though never reaching – the sort of unnerving, slightly-too-serious atmosphere of menace that characterised the best witchcraft films (The Devil Rides Out, for example)."

Shane M. Dallmann of Video Watchdog magazine calls Virgin Witch an "undemanding" film that "primarily exists to supply the bountiful nudity that Hammer films were only beginning to offer (Austin's film easily out-lusts Lust for a Vampire, for instance) – with character, plot and motivation given the most superficial attention possible throughout." However, he praises the film for its art direction and "skilful deep-focus photography".

Ian Jane of review website DVD Talk sums up Virgin Witch as "not the 'be all, end all' of British horror films" but still "an entertaining and occasionally sleazy slice of Seventies occult-themed picture with some great style and memorable scenes."

== See also ==
- List of films about witchcraft
