= Edgar Mansfield =

NZ sculptor (1907-1996)

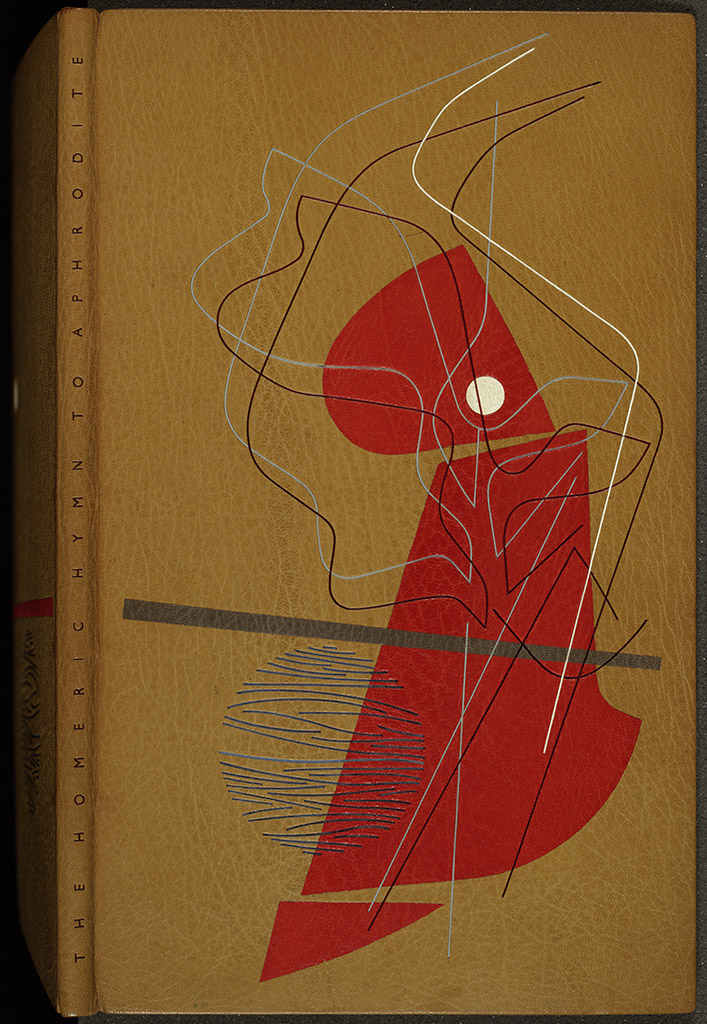
Upper cover of The Homeric Hymn to Aphrodite by F. L. Lucas (Golden Cockerel Press, 1948)

James Frank Edgar Mansfield OBE (11 February 1907 − 10 August 1996) was a New Zealand bookbinder and sculptor, who has been described as the "main inspiration behind modern British bookbinding".

== Early life and education ==
Mansfield was born in London in 1907 and died in Bearsted, Kent 10 August 1996. In 1911 his parents emigrated to New Zealand, settling in Hastings.

Mansfield matriculated from Napier Boys' High School in 1923 and studied art in Dunedin at the King Edward Technical College with William Allen and Robert Nettleton Field. After four years teaching at the Feilding Agricultural School (now Feilding High School) he travelled to London in 1934 to continue his studies.

In London Mansfield studied pottery at the Camberwell School of Art & Crafts, bookbinding at the Central School of Art & Crafts, and design at the Reimann School.

Mansfield served with the British army from 1941 to 1946 in both England and India; he was repatriated to New Zealand but returned to London in 1947.

== Work ==
In the late 1940s Mansfield decided to focus on bookbinding. His work re-energised the art form:

Instead of adopting the traditional decorative motifs of the bookbinder, he looked to contemporary fine art for inspiration. His bold and expressive designs, derived from the language of abstract art, helped to revitalise the craft of bookbinding during the 1940s and 1950s.

Mansfield also taught at the London College of Printing (now the London College of Communication) from 1948 to 1964, where his colleagues included bookbinder Ivor Robinson.

He continued binding, though less consistently, until 1976, when failing eyesight forced him to give up the craft and return to sculpture and drawing.

Mansfield returned to New Zealand following his retirement. Though largely living in England for most of his adult life he visited New Zealand frequently and maintained contact with New Zealand friends and artists, thinking of himself as “a New Zealander through and through”.

Between 1981 and 1985 plans were made for a book about Mansfield to be published by Ian and Joyce Vigor Brown, owners of the Vigor Brown Gallery in Napier. A text was commissioned from anthropologist Terence Barrow, Brian Brake photographed Mansfield's sculptures, Mansfield wrote a text about his life and approach to his work, and the Governor-General of the time Sir David Beattie contributed an introduction. The book never reached publication but a slightly edited version of Mansfield's text, with Brake's photographs, was printed in the journal Art New Zealand in 2007. In the text, on the topic 'The Importance of Line', Mansfield wrote

For more than sixty years drawing and especially line drawing, has played the vital role in all my work. So has music, notably the violin — a line 'singing'. I love the words of Paul Klee — 'taking a line for a walk'. It has been the adventure of these lines, and the resulting shapes and spaces, between and beyond, which has been my primary interest. Hundreds, possibly thousands of creative drawings, have evolved my personal development in art, and provided the source background of my bookbinding and sculpture, which are essentially tooled drawings on an almost flat surface.

== Recognition ==
Mansfield served as the first president of the Guild of Contemporary Bookbinders, between 1955 and 1968, and was elected a Fellow of the Royal British Society of Sculptors in 1980.

In the 1979 Queen's Birthday Honours, Mansfield was appointed an Officer of the Order of the British Empire, for services as a bookbinder and sculptor.

The Mansfield Medal, awarded in the annual British Designer Bookbinders Society competition, is named in his honour.
