= Anthony Cains =

English bookbinder and conservator (1936–2020)

- Born: Anthony Gerald Cains; 28 December 1936; London, England
- Died: 4 November 2020 (aged 83); Dublin, Ireland
- Occupation: Book conservator
- Spouse: Elaine McCory (m. 1965)
- Children: 3

Anthony Gerald (Tony) Cains (28 December 1936 – 4 November 2020) was an English bookbinder, book conservator, and director of conservation at the Library of Trinity College Dublin. Cains was known for his conservation and rebinding of many significant manuscripts including the 8th-century Book of Mulling for Trinity College Dublin, the early medieval Stowe Missal for the Royal Irish Academy, and the 15th-century Ellesmere Manuscript of Chaucer's Canterbury Tales for the Huntington Library.

== Early life and training ==
Cains was born in London in 1936, the only child of Alfred and Vera Cains. He grew up in Kilburn, a London suburb. While his father served in the army during World War II, a young Cains was evacuated to the New Forest. In the 1950s, he performed military service in the catering corps. He had an interest in becoming a gunsmith, but his father encouraged him to pursue bookbinding.

Cains studied at the London College of Printing and was an apprentice bookbinder with Messrs E. A. Neale from 1953 to 1960. He worked as an assistant to bookbinder Sydney (Sandy) Cockerell (son of Douglas Cockerell) from 1961 to 1965, and then briefly as a bookbinder for HMSO Bindery in 1965 before setting up his own workshop in St Albans. Cains was also a part-time instructor at Camberwell School of Art and Crafts, the London College of Printing, and the Farnham School of Art.

== Career ==
Cains traveled to Italy with a team of British conservators in response to the catastrophic flooding of the River Arno in Florence in November 1966. He remained in Florence and served as technical director of conservation at the Biblioteca Nazionale Centrale di Firenze from 1967 to 1972, managing a staff of 90 to conserve thousands of books damaged by water and mud.

In 1972, Cains was recruited by the Library of Trinity College Dublin and appointed Technical Director of Conservation, a position he held until his retirement in 2002. He created the binding for The Great Book of Ireland (1989–1991), an anthology of modern Irish art and poetry, now in the collection of the University College Cork Library. In the 1990s, he was involved in designing and implementing a new display system for the Book of Kells that included security and environmental controls.

In the mid-1990s, Cains, along with Christopher Clarkson and others, set up the European School of Conservation and Restoration in Spoleto, Italy, where he also taught.

Cains was a founding member and later director of the Institute for the Conservation of Historic and Artistic Works (now the Institute of Conservator-Restorers in Ireland) and received a Lifetime Achievement Award from the organization in 2014.

== Personal life ==
Cains married Elaine McCoy in 1965 and the couple had three sons. They owned a Georgian home, and Cains managed its restoration. He enjoyed fly-fishing and tied his own flies.

== Death ==
Cains died in 2020 at his home in Dublin on the 54th anniversary of the 1966 Florence flood.

== See also ==
- Preservation (library and archive)
- Conservation and restoration of illuminated manuscripts
