= Khoi Vinh =

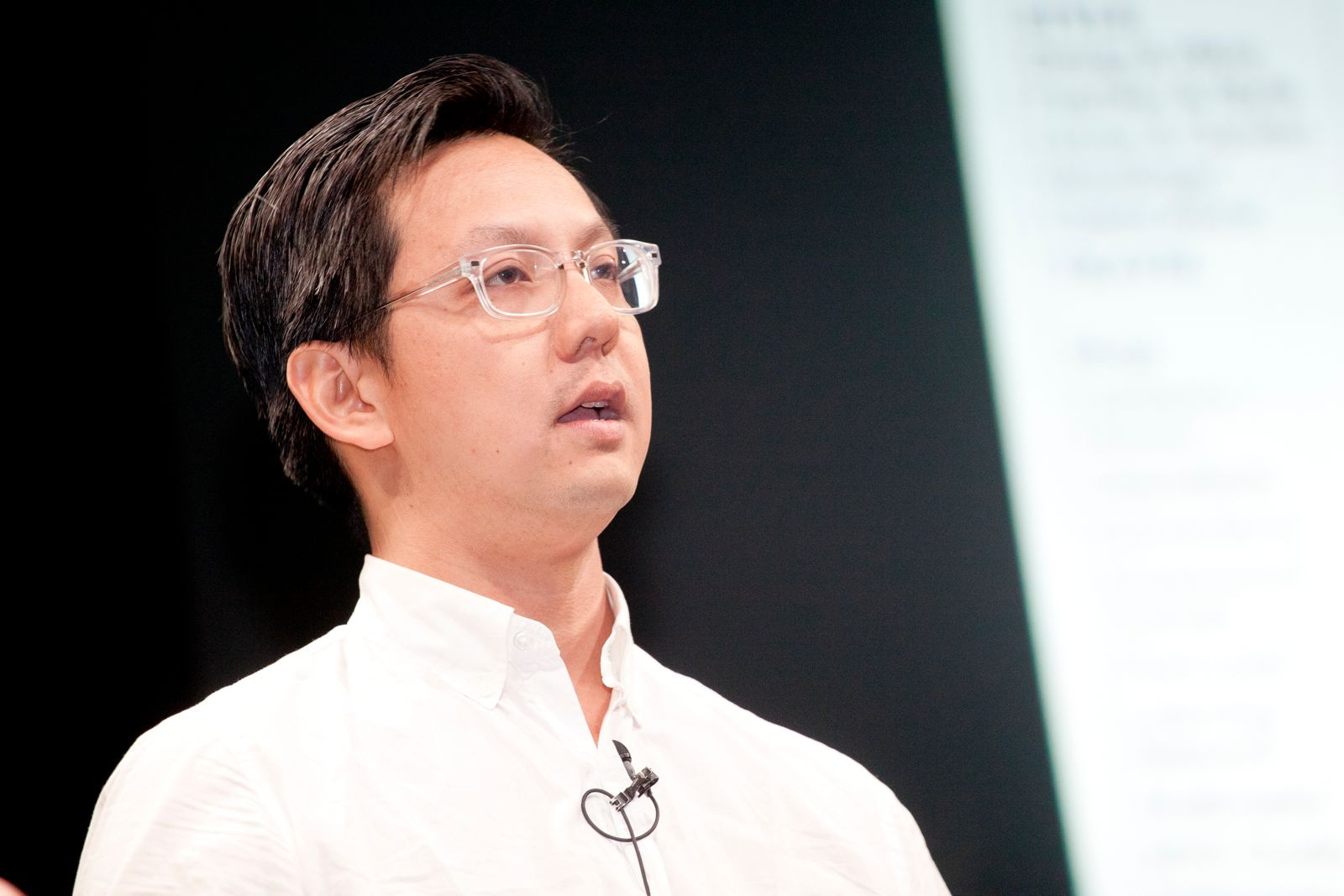
Khoi Vinh at the TYPO SF conference in 2012

Khoi Vinh (born December 3, 1971) is a graphic designer, blogger, and former Design Director for The New York Times, where he worked from January 2006 until July 2010. Fast Company named Vinh one of "The 50 Most Influential Designers in America" in September 2011.

== Biography ==
He was born in 1971 in Saigon, South Vietnam, and immigrated to the United States at the age of three and a half with his family. He grew up in Gaithersburg, Maryland. He attended Otis College of Art and Design, graduating with a major in Graphic Design in 1993. In 1998, he moved to New York City and began designing almost exclusively for the web and interactive media.

In 2001, he co-founded a design studio, Behavior, where he worked until December 2005, when he became the design director for NYTimes.com in 2006. In 2011, he and Scott Ostler founded Lascaux Co., a New York City startup. In November 2011, the company launched Mixel, an iPad app that allows users to create "art". In 2013, he sold Mixel to Etsy and joined their team.

In 2015 Vinh joined Adobe Inc. as a principal designer. He is currently senior director of product design with the company.
