= Leafcasting =

Technique for repairing paper

Leafcasting is a method of strengthening paper so as to preserve it. Leafcasting fills in parts that may be missing in papers by the design of conservators or by age. The process covers an existing sheet of damaged paper with replacement fiber, thus increasing its future usability. The process must be performed on a perfectly calibrated machine to avoid damaging the paper. There are few institutions around the world that have the capabilities to perform leafcasting treatments. As few institutions have the required equipment, leafcasting is not a popular form of paper strengthening.

Computerized leafcasting was first employed in the mid-1980s at the Folger Shakespeare Library.
