= Bernard Middleton =

English bookbinder and restorer (1924-2019)

Bernard Middleton MBE
- Born: 29 October 1924; London, England
- Died: 28 January 2019 (aged 94); London, England
- Education: Central School of Arts and Crafts
- Occupations: Bookbinder; Conservator-restorer
- Notable work: A History of English Craft Bookbinding Technique (1963); The Restoration of Leather Bindings (1972)

Bernard Chester Middleton MBE (29 October 1924 – 28 January 2019) was a preeminent British restoration bookbinder. He was regarded as one of the foremost book craftsmen and trade historians of modern times, lecturing and teaching in Europe (Belgium, Switzerland, and the Netherlands) and the Americas (Brazil, the United States, and Venezuela). He authored two major works, A History of English Craft Bookbinding Technique (1963) and The Restoration of Leather Bindings (1972), which became essential reading for professional bookbinders, scholars and collectors.

In the trade, he was known as "The Great Man". He was elected a fellow of the Royal Society of Arts in 1951 and, in 1986, was awarded an MBE for services to bookbinding. His gold-tooled bindings may be seen in the British Library, the Victoria and Albert Museum, the Royal Library, Windsor, and the Wormsley Library, and in other major libraries worldwide.

== Biography ==
Bernard Middleton was born in London to Doris Hilda Middleton (née Webster), a secretary to a well-known barrister, and Regent Marcus Geoffrey Middleton, himself a noted bookbinder.

In 1938, at the age of thirteen, he earned a trade scholarship to attend the Central School of Arts and Crafts, in London, has his father had done before him. When he was sixteen, his father helped him secure a six-year apprenticeship at the British Museum Bindery, during which he was awarded the City and Guilds of London Institute's silver medal in Forwarding, the first prize. His military service during the Second World War, during which he served in the Home Guard from 1941 to 1943 and in the Royal Navy from 1943 to 1946, meant his internship had to be interrupted and only concluded in 1949. At this time, he attended evening classes at the London School of Printing, and then secured the prestigious position of Craftsman-Demonstrator at the Royal College of Art, working under Roger Powell (who Middleton considered "one of the most important and influential bookbinders of the last hundred years and, arguably, of any period").

His experience secured his election as a Fellow in the Royal Society of Arts in 1951 and, that same year, he became a manager at the important bindery Zaehnsdorf's. Also in 1951, he married Dora Mary Davies (d. 1997), an accountant who had formerly been in the WRAF — finding the work environment at Zaehnsdorf's untenable, the couple soon established their own book-restoration business in Soho. From 1960, Middleton lived and worked in Gauden Road, Clapham, South London.

Around this time, Middleton was invited by the journal Paper & Print and the British & Colonial Printer to contribute a series of articles on historical or technical aspects of the craft, his topics of interest; he kept publishing many scholarly articles until 1958, when work on his A History of English Craft Bookbinding Technique began in earnest; his pioneering magnum opus was finally published in 1963, and was praised by the likes of Howard Nixon as "the first attempt to chart the history of English bookbinding in all its technical aspects", Carolyn Price Horton as "a chronology of the craft", and Roger Powell as "the door is here opened on a world that has heretofore been terra incognita to all but a very few bibliophiles and book collectors". His second landmark work, The Restoration of Leather Bindings, was first published in 1972.

In 1955, Middleton helped found the Guild of Contemporary Bookbinders (now Designer Bookbinders), which he presided in 1973-75 and became an Honorary Fellow in 2011. He was also a Brother of the Art Workers' Guild from 1961, and a Fellow of the Society of Antiquaries. In 2002, Middleton was made Patron of the Society of Bookbinders. In 2006, the Institute of Conservation made him an Honorary Fellow, and in 2010 the Antiquarian Booksellers' Association made him an Honorary Member. He was elected a member of the Association internationale de bibliophilie in 2002. Among others, foreign honours bestowed on him include the knighthood of the Légion d'Honneur (France) in 2015.

In 2000, his collection of books on bookbinding was installed at the Carey Library Rochester Institute of Technology (as the "Bernard C. Middleton Collection of Books on the History and Practice of Bookbinding"); in that occasion, a conference in his honour was held there with an attendance of more than 400 people from nearly 40 countries. That year, the British Library and Oak Knoll republished his memoirs (was first printed in 1995 by the Bird and Bull Press), under the title Recollections: A Life in Bookbinding. Several of his scholarly articles about several aspects of bookbinding were reprinted in 2015, under the title A Bookbinders Miscellany.

Suffering a first stroke in 2011, he gradually became slower and weaker, and eventually retired at the age of 92, after 78 years in the trade. Eric Horne, Middleton's long-time assistant since 1961 had retired in 1986; for 12 years his place was taken by Flora Ginn, who carries on in the Middleton tradition.

He spent the last two years of his life virtually confined to bed and, with difficulty in shaving, grew a snowy white beard. His mind remained sharp in spite of his advanced age, and kept an interest in meeting book dealers and collectors that he knew, and collecting fine gold tooled bindings in book fairs (which he reluctantly visited in his wheelchair). He died of a stroke on 28 January 2019.
