= Peter Waters =

Book conservation specialist (1930-2003)

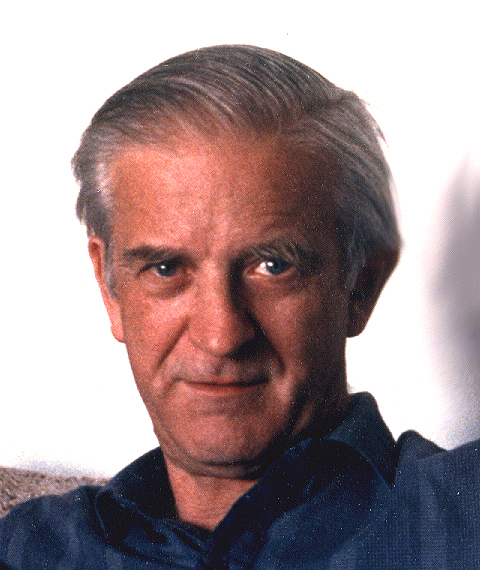
- Peter Waters, 1990s.
- Born: Peter Godfrey Waters; 19 May 1930; Surrey, England
- Died: 26 June 2003 (aged 73); Fairfield, Pennsylvania, United States
- Occupations: bookbinder, book conservator
- Spouse: Sheila Waters
- Children: Michael Waters, Chris Waters, Julian Waters

Peter Godfrey Waters (19 May 1930 – 26 June 2003) was a British librarian. A Conservation Officer at the Library of Congress in Washington, D.C., US, he worked in the areas of disaster recovery and preparedness, and the salvage of water-damaged paper goods. His published works, specifically Procedures for Salvage of Water Damaged Library Materials, are considered the standard for this area of conservation.

== Biography ==
Born in 1930 in Woking, Surrey, England, Peter Waters began his formal education in 1945 at the Guildford College of Art, Surrey, where he studied bookbinding under the instruction of William Matthews. He then went on to study at the Royal College of Art in 1949 and eventually teach at the Farnham School of Art and the Royal College of Art.

While at the Royal College of Art, Waters became a close friend and associate of his tutor Roger Powell, a well known preservationist and bookbinder whose work includes the 1953 restoration of The Book of Kells. At the RCA, Waters also met his future wife, Sheila, who was soon to become a calligrapher and map designer. In 1957, Waters and Powell formed a professional partnership in book binding and conservation at the bindery in Hampshire. They produced many designer bindings for museums and collectors, often aided by Sheila, who made many drawings and designs for stamping engravings. Powell and Waters were called upon to restore many rare books, including The Book of Durrow, the Books of Dimma and Armagh, and the Lichfield Gospels. Waters eventually took over Powell's position at the Royal College of Art and remained there until he and his family moved to the United States in 1971. A DVD entitled Peter Waters, Master Bookbinder has been produced featuring his early bindings from student days to the mid-1960s, prior to the Florence flood.

In 1971, Waters was appointed the Conservation Officer and Chief of the Conservation Division at the United States Library of Congress in Washington, D.C. Under Waters' supervision, a new conservation lab was created so as to allow for the restoration of many of the items found in the Library of Congress's huge collection of library materials, artefacts and cultural archives.

Waters remained at the Library of Congress until 1995 when he retired, although he remained an active member of the conservation community and served on the National Archives Preservation Committee and was a fellow of the International Institute for Conservation and the American Institute for Conservation of Historic and Artistic Works.

Waters died on 26 June 2003, of mesothelioma-related heart failure. His exposure to asbestos dust while making and using asbestos handles on finishing tools from the mid-1950s on is suspected for his development of this form of cancer.

== Significance to preservation ==
Dealing primarily with disaster preparedness, Waters was instrumental in developing recovery plans for large natural disasters affecting libraries and archives, most notably "Procedures for Salvage of Water Damaged Library Materials",^{1} which was originally published in 1975 and revised in 1993. Of all of Waters' conservation efforts, his work with the Biblioteca Nazionale Centrale Firenze after the Arno River Flood in Florence, Italy, in November 1966, and the Library of Congress as Conservation Officer are the most well known.

=== Arno River Flood, 1966 ===
In the aftermath of the Arno River Flood, thousands of books housed in the Biblioteca Nazionale Centrale Firenze (BNCF) were left damaged by water, dirt and oil. Because of its location, the BNCF experienced some of the worst damage in Florence and materials were literally shovelled into trucks to be dried out in tobacco kilns before being returned to the BNCF for further preservation.^{4} Of the collections, the Magliabechiana and Palatina were among the more valuable.^{5} Waters led a preservation effort, with the support of the Council on Library Resources and James Lewis of Imperial College, London, to preserve the BNCF's materials that included a multi-phase restoration effort to clean, dry and re-bind some of the library's valuable and rare books. Waters was also in charge of training and managing over 120 volunteers, referred to as "mud angels", during the duration of his stay, and he designed all the work stations which were used by the conservation staff over many years following the flood.^{2}

=== Other disasters ===
After his work in the Florence flood response he was called to respond to a flood in Lisbon in 1967, and fires at the Los Angeles Central Library (1986) and at the Library of The Academy of Sciences (BAN) in St Petersburg, Russia (1988).

=== Library of Congress ===
Appointed the Conservation Officer and Chief of the Conservation Division at the Library of Congress in 1971, Waters began a long career aiding the United States' largest library in its conservation efforts and has been dubbed the "father of American Library Conservation".^{7} Within a few years of his placement, Waters had developed new conservation programs including the point system, "whereby the Library's custodial divisions were assigned a budget of treatment hours in a given year, which were reasonably committed through ongoing liaison with senior conservators on his staff^{2}", and the popular "phased preservation" technique. Hailed as the most effective and non-invasive treatment of large collections of deteriorating materials, phased preservation "emphasizes actions that have the greatest impact on the preservation of collections as a whole, rather than concentrating on treating individual items and includes surveys to establish priorities, disaster planning, environmental controls, and holdings maintenance."^{6} Waters is also credited with inspiring his son Michael Waters and daughter-in-law Carmen Waters to develop computerised box-making machinery and software to produce archival custom boxes. Peter and Sheila Waters' other sons are Chris Waters, owner of Multimedia solutions, Maryland: and Julian Waters, who was also protégé of the type designer Hermann Zapf.^{2}

== See also ==
- Preservation (library and archive)
- Library and Information Science
- Archival science
- Biblioteca Nazionale Centrale Firenze
- 1966 Flood of the Arno River
- Library of Congress

== Sources ==
- ^{4}Clarkson, Christopher. (2003) "The Florence Flood of November 1966 & its aftermath". Accessed on 8 April 2014.
- ^{5}Metelli, Piero. (2007) "History, Foundation and Function". Accessed on 12 June 2007.
- ^{6} Pearce-Moses, Richard. A Glossary of Archival and Records Terminology. Vol. 2. Chicago: Society of American Archivists, 2005.
- ^{7}"Caring for America's Library." The Library of Congress: Preservation. 18 October 2006. The Library of Congress. Accessed on 12 June 2007.
- "Peter Waters: Master Bookbinder" (2006) video by Sheila Waters & David Swerdlott. Accessed on 9 September 2025, Marriott Library of the University of Utah .
- The Restoration of Books, Florence, 1968. Directed by Roger Hill. Produced by the Royal College of Art, London, 1968. Technical consultant, Peter Waters. Accessed 15 September 2025 at the Marriott Digital Library, The University of Utah
