= Sheila Waters =

British calligrapher and teacher (1929–2022)

Sheila Waters (13 March 1929 – 18 March 2022) was a British calligrapher and teacher who spent the last half-century of her life in the United States.

== Life ==
Sheila Waters was born in Gravesend, England, on 13 March 1929. She graduated from the Medway College of Art, Kent, in 1948 with a Diploma of Design, and received an associate degree from the Royal College of Art in London in 1951. There she developed her calligraphic skills under the tutelage of Dorothy Mahoney (assistant to the calligrapher Edward Johnston).

At twenty-two, Waters was elected a fellow of the Society of Scribes and Illuminators. She inaugurated the program of calligraphy courses at the Smithsonian Institution, Washington, D.C., and later developed her own private classes and annual workshops. Waters was the first president and founding member of the Washington Calligraphers Guild.

Waters was married to bookbinder and conservator Peter Waters from 1953 until his death in 2003. One of her three sons is Julian Waters, a noted calligrapher and typographer. In 1971 the family moved to the United States after Peter was appointed Chief of Conservation at the Library of Congress. Once she obtained a teaching job in 1976, she was able to be more selective about what calligraphy work she took on and dedicate more time to develop her craft as an art form.

== Books and artwork ==
Between 1961 and 1978, Waters hand-lettered and illustrated an illuminated manuscript of Dylan Thomas' Under Milk Wood. The book was released in 1979.

Waters is the author of Foundations of Calligraphy, published in 2006. Her 2016 book Waters Rising: Letters from Florence documented her husband's efforts to save hundreds of thousands of books damaged in the 1966 Florence flood.

Time-Line Triptych is the name of an artwork from 1986 which consists of three works individually titled Ancient, Mediaeval and Modern in gouache and pastel.
