= Roger Powell (bookbinder) =

English bookbinder (1896-1990)

Roger Powell OBE
- Born: 17 May 1896; London, England
- Died: 16 October 1990 (aged 94); Portsmouth, Hampshire, England
- Occupation: Bookbinder

Roger Powell OBE (17 May 1896 – 16 October 1990) was an English bookbinder.

Powell was born in London. He was educated at Bedales School, of which his father was co-founder. He served as a signals officer in the Royal Flying Corps in World War I and then became a poultry farmer. In 1930 he began training as a bookbinder at the Central School of Arts and Crafts in London. After he completed the course he opened his own bindery, then became a partner with Sandy Cockerell in the major bindery of Cockerell & Son in Letchworth, Hertfordshire. He also taught part-time at the Central School until 1943, when he moved to the Royal College of Art, where he taught until his retirement in 1956. There he was succeeded by his best pupil Peter Waters.

Powell left Cockerell & Son in 1947 and again set up his own bindery in Froxfield, Hampshire. Here he did some of his most notable work, including the rebinding of the Book of Kells and Book of Durrow in 1953, the Lichfield Gospels in 1962, and work on many other important historical manuscripts. He studied, but did not alter, the oldest European leather binding to survive, that of the Stonyhurst or St Cuthbert Gospel, and his two chapters on the binding in books edited by Battiscombe (1956) and Brown (1969) remain the most important literature on the subject. He and Peter Waters became partners in the Froxfield firm, working together until Waters emigrated to the United States in 1971. Aided by the design talents of Peter's wife, calligrapher Sheila Waters, this partnership produced some of the most masterful and acclaimed collector designer bindings of the mid-20th century. They worked on the conservation of the many books and manuscripts damaged in the Florence flood of 1966. Powell was appointed an Officer of the Order of the British Empire (OBE) in 1976. He was a member of the Red Rose Guild.

Fellow binder and collector Bernard Middleton described Powell as "one of the most important and influential bookbinders of the last hundred years and, arguably, of any period". In his monograph on the Book of Durrow, Bernard Meehan, Keeper of Manuscripts at Trinity College Dublin, described Powell as "the leading bookbinder of his day".
