= Letter Arts Review =

US magazine

Letter Arts Review (formerly Calligraphy Review and originally Calligraphy Idea Exchange) is a quarterly magazine devoted to contemporary and historical lettering, calligraphy, typography, and text-based art. The magazine was established in 1982. It was published by John Neal Bookseller until issue 35.1 (January 2021). In June 2021 Greg Sharp, President and CEO of Sea Hill Press Inc, became the third publisher of the Magazine. Letter Arts Review is edited and designed by the calligrapher Christopher Calderhead. The magazine is headquartered in Leesburg, Florida, United States. A juried issue showing contemporary developments within this field is published annually.
