= The Best of Benny Hill =

1974 British film by John Robins

- US DVD Cover
- Directed by: John Robins
- Written by: Benny Hill
- Produced by: John Robins; Roy Skeggs
- Starring: Benny Hill
- Music by: Benny Hill; Boots Randolph
- Production companies: Euston Films (Thames Television)
- Distributed by: EMI Films
- Release dates: 8 March 1974 (US); 12 May 1975 (UK)
- Running time: 83 min.
- Country: UK
- Language: English

The Best of Benny Hill is a 1974 film version of material from the television comedy series The Benny Hill Show. This movie features sketches from the early Thames Television years, from 1969 to 1973. The sketches in the film are from episodes produced and directed by John Robins.

== Contents ==
Sketches include:

- Ye Olde Wishing Well (19 November 1969) – including an appearance by David Prowse
- Lower Tidmarsh Hospital Service (19 November 1969)
- Spuddo Blooper (19 November 1969) – parodies of television adverts, for products such as margarine and mashed potato.
- "Throw Open" Blooper (19 November 1969)
- The Life of Maurice Dribble (25 December 1969)
- Tommy Tupper in Tupper-Time (4 February 1970) – a parody of Simon Dee and the chat show Dee Time
- Song: "My Garden of Love" (11 March 1970)
- The Party Blooper (11 March 1970)
- "After Dinner with Charlotte Fudge" Blooper (11 March 1970)
- Boutique Mask Dance (28 October 1970)
- Love Will Find A Way (27 January 1971; presented in black and white, as production occurred during ITV's Colour Strike)
- The Grass Is Greener (24 March 1971)
- Fred Scuttle's Health Farm and Keep Fit Brigade (23 February 1972)
- Pierre De Tierre: Avant-Garde French Film Director (23 February 1972)
- Chow-Mein at Customs and Immigration (23 February 1972)
- Benny's All-Star Finale (23 February 1972) – including Benny Hill's impersonations of Nana Mouskouri, Moira Anderson and Gilbert O'Sullivan
- Escaped Convict Chase Sequence (23 February 1972)

== Cast ==
- Benny Hill
- Patricia Hayes
- Henry McGee
- Nicholas Parsons
- Bob Todd
- Jackie Wright
- Andrée Melly
- Rita Webb
- Lesley Goldie
- Jackie Wright
- Penny Meredith
- Michael Sharvell-Martin
- Bettina Le Beau
- Jenny Lee-Wright
- David Prowse
- Pamela Cundell
- Arthur Hewlett
- Roy Scammell
- David Hamilton
- Ken Sedd
- Freddie Wiles

== Production ==
The original programs were recorded on videotape (studio interiors) and shot on 16 mm film (location footage); the videotaped material was transferred to 35 mm film as a telerecording, and the 16 mm footage was blown up to 35 mm.

== Reception ==
The Monthly Film Bulletin wrote: "This questionably titled anthology features material that has been directly lifted (complete with studio audience laughter) from several series of The Benny Hill Show, some of them quite archaic (Tupper Time is a parody of Simon Dee's programmes). The quality of the videotape transfers is variable, with everything that is not in close-up tending towards distortion. The quality of the comedy, however, is consistent: basic British sauce – delivered with much nudging, winking and leering – that reveals Hill's obsession with the comic possibilities of speeded-up film and of being found attractive by both men and women. As a writer, Hill is too often content to contrive his material to fit his jokes; as a performer, he seems to have reached his prime in the late Fifties."

== Home media releases ==
The British film distributor Walton Films released a shortened edition of the movie on three Super 8 film reels.

Anchor Bay Entertainment released the movie on DVD in 2001 for Region 1 format; it would later be re-released by Lionsgate Home Entertainment following Lionsgate's 2016 acquisition of Anchor Bay.

It was released by Network on DVD and Blu-ray in Region 2 format in 2016.
