= Diana Darvey =

British actor, singer and dancer (1945–2000)

- Born: Diana Magdalene Roloff; 21 April 1945; Cheadle, Cheshire, England
- Died: 11 April 2000 (aged 54); Redhill, Surrey, England
- Occupations: Actress, singer, dancer
- Spouse(s): Terry Gittings (divorced); Ralph Barker (m. 1995-2000; her death)

Diana Magdalene Roloff (21 April 1945 – 11 April 2000), known professionally as Diana Darvey, was a British actress, singer and dancer, best known for her appearances on The Benny Hill Show.

== Early life and career ==
The daughter of a former Windmill Girl, Pamela Cooper, Diana was raised and educated in Bristol. Her father died when she was just two and, when she first entered show business, she adopted the surname "Davey" from her mother's second husband (the "r" was added years later).

In 1962, aged 17, Darvey made her first stage appearance as a pantomime dancer in Bath, and a year later, became a Butlin's Redcoat. She then became part of a London ballet troupe which travelled Sweden, Germany, and Spain. After the tour ended, Darvey settled in Spain, where she became a popular revista performer under famed Spanish impresario Colsada. Then for the next several years she appeared in musical theatre productions in and around Spain. It was during one such performance, in Madrid in the early 1970s, that she was "discovered" again, this time by Benny Hill.

== The Benny Hill Show ==
Darvey made her first appearance on The Benny Hill Show on 7 February 1974, and became an instant hit with fans. Her self-designed, often gravity-defying costumes became as famous as her show-stopping performances. While she sang such Continental music standards as "Sway", "Quizás, Quizás, Quizás", and "Perfidia" on the show, perhaps her most famous number was a four-song medley fronted by "It's Nice to Go Trav'lin'" (which Frank Sinatra recorded on his 1957 album Come Fly with Me), and also featuring a rendition of Maurice Chevalier's "Valentine".

In the nearly four-minute number, which she sang in English, French and Spanish, Darvey wore a total of four costumes, including as a belly dancer. She was also known for the "Continental Cabaret" sketch which she performed with Hill and regular sidekick Jackie Wright, and which featured a gag involving the word "supercalifragilisticexpialidocious". She participated in other sketches, including as Hill's girlfriend in a gender-reverse parody of the 1956 film Baby Doll, repeating a sketch that Hill had performed in 1965 with Elaine Taylor. In total, Darvey appeared on the show five times, the last being on 26 January 1977.

== Life after Benny Hill ==
Darvey parlayed her popularity from The Benny Hill Show to appearances on the game show Quick on the Draw and the sitcom ...And Mother Makes Five, and a role in the 1975 film Carry On Behind. In the immediate years after her last Hill show appearance, Darvey travelled the world with her cabaret act, with her then-husband, Terry Gittings (former drummer for Georgie Fame). For a time in the early 1980s, she was based in Miami Beach, Florida, where by then The Benny Hill Show had become famous in the United States through syndication. Their marriage ended in divorce a few years later, and Diana later ended up back in England where, at one point, she managed a pub in Bodicote, Oxfordshire.

== Death ==
In 1995, Darvey married for a second time, to author Ralph Barker. She died on 11 April 2000, ten days before her 55th birthday.

She fell down the stairs in her home, and although it was not a serious fall it created a linear fracture in the left femur just below her pelvis. A fat embolism resulted due to marrow leakage from the untreated fracture, then traveled to her lung and she went into severe respiratory failure which resulted in her death.
