= Transistor Radio (song) =

Single by Benny Hill
- Released: 1961
- Genre: Pop
- Length: 3:01
- Label: Pye
- Songwriters: Benny Hill, Tony Hatch,
- Producer: Tony Hatch

Benny Hill singles chronology
"Gather in the Mushrooms" (1961)	"Transistor Radio" (1961)	"Harvest of Love" (1963)

"Transistor Radio" is a comic song written by Benny Hill and Mark Anthony (a pseudonym of producer Tony Hatch), and performed by Hill. The song revolves around the story of a man whose attempts at intimacy with his girlfriend are constantly thwarted by music played from the girl's transistor radio. The song spoofs the Chipmunks, Elvis Presley's "Wooden Heart", the BBC Shipping Forecast and Jimmy Jones' "Handy Man".

"Transistor Radio" finished with the now-married couple alone in bed, with the expectant wife disappointed when her husband asks "'Ere, where's the radio?" Released as a single in 1961, the song reached the #24 in the UK Singles Chart.

== Revised version ==
In 1972, Hill performed a radically revamped version of this song, now called "Portable TV Set", on his television show, on which he offered impersonations of Ironside, Clement Freud, Stars on Sunday host Jess Yates and Maggie Stredder of the Ladybirds. The role of his television-obsessed girlfriend was played by Jenny Lee-Wright.
