= Lucky Bastard Club =

The Lucky Bastard Club was an informal grouping of World War II European bomber crew members from the Eighth Air Force who completed a tour of duty. The members are the pilots that flew out on a mission to the enemy base and successfully struck their targets and returned to base in spite of the presence of anti-aircraft weapons and enemy fighters. Pilots were also considered "lucky" because of their managing to get back to base with an undamaged plane. They often received certificates, a flyover through the base, and an honorary dinner for the crew. Membership gave crews credit for the work they did in the air. They were treated with high respect by their fellow peers and military cohorts. Club members were allowed special spots in mess halls.

Some forty thousand airmen died by the end of World War II, or one in three crewmen. A World War II bomber crew member's life expectancy was fifteen missions. At the beginning of the war, twenty-five missions was considered a full tour of duty, but once pilots became more efficient and effective in air combat, the standard increased to thirty-five missions.

== See also ==
- Caterpillar Club
- Goldfish Club
