= Ernie (The Fastest Milkman in the West) =

Single by Benny Hill

from the album Words and Music
- B-side: "Ting-A-Ling-A-Loo"
- Released: 1971
- Recorded: EMI, London
- Genre: Novelty
- Length: 3:52
- Label: Columbia
- Songwriter: Benny Hill
- Producer: Walter J. Ridley

Benny Hill singles chronology
"Harvest of Love" (1963)	"Ernie (The Fastest Milkman in the West)" (1971)

"Ernie (The Fastest Milkman in the West)" is an innuendo-laden comedy or novelty song, written and performed by the English comedian Benny Hill. The song was first performed on television in 1970, and released as a successful recording, topping the UK singles chart in December 1971, reaching the Christmas number one spot. The song also peaked at number 1 in Australia in February 1972. On the New Zealand Listener charts it reached number 3. Hill received an Ivor Novello Award from the British Academy of Songwriters, Composers and Authors in 1972.

The single's B-side, "Ting-A-Ling-A-Loo", is a music hall parody. Hill later suggested that the melody of "Ting-A-Ling-A-Loo" had been largely plagiarised in the Spitting Image 1986 hit song "The Chicken Song".

== Story line ==
The lyric's storyline is inspired by Hill's early experience as a milkman for Hann's Dairies in Eastleigh, Hampshire. Market Street, mentioned in the lyrics, is a real-life street in Eastleigh. The song tells the fictional exploits of Ernie Price, a 52-year-old (68, in the original television version) milkman who drives a horse-drawn milk cart. It relates his feud with the bread delivery man ("Two-Ton Ted" from Teddington) and their efforts to win the heart of Sue, a widow who lives alone at No. 22, Linley Lane.

When Ted sees Ernie's cart outside Sue's house all afternoon, he becomes enraged and violently kicks Price's horse, Trigger. The two men resort to a duel, using the wares they carry on their respective carts for weapons, and Ernie is killed by a rock cake underneath his heart, followed by a stale pork pie in his eye; in the original television version it was a fresh meat pie.

Sue and Ted then marry, but sounds outside their bedroom make them wonder if Ernie's ghost has returned to haunt them on their wedding night.

== History ==
"Ernie" was originally written in 1955 as the introduction to an unfilmed screenplay about Hill's milkman experiences.

The song's content and style parody popular cowboy-story American country songs such as the 1966 Frank Gallop US hit "The Ballad of Irving". "The Ballad of Irving" was itself inspired by Lorne Greene's song "Ringo" from 1964, which had the same style and structure.

Hill performed the song on The Benny Hill Show in 1970. The original clip is seldom repeated as it was made in black and white owing to a technicians' strike, but the episode has been released on DVD, in both the United Kingdom and United States.

The following year, it was included with minor lyrical revisions on Hill's album Words and Music. When it was released as a single on EMI's Columbia label, it became a surprise number-one hit, topping the UK Singles Chart for four weeks at Christmas 1971. A promotional film, starring Hill as Ernie, Henry McGee as Ted, and Jan Butlin as Sue, was filmed in Vicarage Road, Maidenhead, Berkshire.

Hill re-recorded the song, shortly before his death in 1992, for the album Benny Hill... The Best Of.

== Legacy ==
On Desert Island Discs in May 2006, Conservative Party leader, later Prime Minister of the United Kingdom, David Cameron picked it as one of his eight favourite records.

== See also ==
- List of number-one singles from the 1970s (UK)
- List of number-one singles in Australia during the 1970s
