= Sue Upton =

British actress

- Born: 9 November 1954 (age 71); Chadwell Heath, Essex, England
- Occupations: Actress, comedienne, dancer
- Spouse(s): Roger Whatling, 1977-present
- Children: 2, with Whatling
- Website: http://www.sueupton.net

Sue Upton (born 9 November 1954 at Chadwell Heath, Essex) is an English comic actress and dancer, best known for her many appearances on The Benny Hill Show. She was one of the longest-serving cast members of Benny Hill's stock company, appearing on the show from 1977 to his final programme for Thames Television in 1989. Upton also appeared in Benny Hill's World Tour: New York, in 1991.

== Education and early career ==
Upton attended stage school in addition to her regular education. Despite qualifying at the age of 16 as a teacher of dancing, she decided that a performing career would be more to her liking.

After graduation, Upton embarked on a career as a dancer and cabaret singer; she also worked as a model, continuing with this work until she was well into her twenties. She was a member of Love Machine, a female dance troupe. Love Machine went on to appear on three episodes of The Benny Hill Show, where they were a precursor to the later, more famous, Hill's Angels dancers. Although she had left the group before their Benny Hill Show appearances, her stint as a Love Machine dancer first brought her to Hill's attention.

== The Benny Hill Show ==
Upton auditioned at Hill's flat in the Kensington area of London in 1976, and was hired shortly after. Hill said of her at the time, "Sue is really funny. Finding pretty girls who are talented and funny is not easy. And not all girl dancers are pretty. Some of them look like me in drag. Sue is pretty and she is funny." She made her Benny Hill Show debut in the episode originally telecast on 26 January 1977.

For roughly the first half of her time on The Benny Hill Show, she both danced as a member of the Hill's Angels troupe and acted in comedy sketches. As her tenure with the show lengthened, she moved away from dancing in favour of comic acting only. One of Upton's comic character portrayals was the geriatric superheroine "Wondergran". In a later episode, she played Stan Laurel to Benny's Oliver Hardy. Behind the scenes, she became the Angels' unofficial "shop steward" in the show's later years, interceding on their behalf with Hill or with producer Dennis Kirkland when necessary. She also had a hand in the selection of prospective Angels, recommending girls who she thought might be suitable to Hill for auditions.

During her long association with Hill, their relationship developed from that of employee-to-employer to one of mutual friendship. They were deeply fond of each other, to the extent that Hill's close-knit performing "'family' thought Sue could have become Mrs Hill under different circumstances." Hill regularly visited Upton's home every year, becoming friendly with her husband and children as well.

== Other work ==
Upton appeared in two movies: Confessions from a Holiday Camp (1977) and What's Up Superdoc! (1978), both sex comedies. She also appeared in Fall Out for a Smoke (1978), a training film for the British Ministry of Defence. On television, Upton has made guest appearances in several British sketch comedy shows and sitcoms.

After Hill's death in 1992, she decided to retire from show business, although she continued to make appearances on TV documentaries speaking about Hill and about her experiences on the show.

Upton is an active member of Comic Heritage, a nonprofit group (part of the larger Heritage Foundation) which celebrates and promotes the history of British comedy and the remembrance of famous British comics.
