= Chloe Gibson =

English theatre and television director (1899–1995)

- Born: Chloe Cawdle; 18 May 1899; Torquay, Devon, England
- Died: 1 January 1995 (aged 95); Dublin, Ireland
- Occupations: Theatre and television director

Chloe Gibson (18 May 1899 – 1 January 1995) was an English theatre and television director, who directed Telefís Éireann's opening night on New Year's Eve 1961.

== Early life ==
Chloe Gibson was born in Torquay, Devon, England on 18 May 1899. She was the daughter of Walter Ernest Cawdle and Lotte Cawdle (née Saunders). She attended Lauriston Hall, Torquay. Gibson studied painting briefly, but went on to train in speech and drama after World War I. She acted with a repertory in Paignton, Devon, and ran a stage school.

== Career ==
Gibson began directing at a number of open-air pageants, producing with Cyril Maude. Her first production was at Christmas 1933 with The blue bird in the Torquay Pavilion. She was a member of the London fire-fighting services during World War II, while also appearing on stage the Apollo, Scala, and Embassy theatres in numerous plays across 1943 and 1944. Her directorial debut in London was at the New Lindsay, Notting Hill Gate with Power Without Glory in 1947, starring Kenneth More and Dirk Bogarde. She went on to direct a number of plays, and was director of productions at the Civic Theatre, Chesterfield, from 1950 to 1953. From the mid 1950s she became a staff producer at the BBC, and was one of the first women to direct plays on television. Family Portrait was one of her first BBC productions, which she originally directed in 1948 at the Strand Theatre. It was a controversial play about the life and death of Christ, and was aired on Easter Sunday 1955. It enraged Cardinal Bernard Griffin of Westminster, who denounced it as offensive to Catholics. Gibson later conceded that the criticism was justified, converting to Catholicism in 1959. Among her notable work with the BBC was directing and producing The Diary of Samuel Pepys and episodes of Maigret.

Gibson moved to Dublin in 1961 when Telefís Éireann was established, directing drama under Hilton Edwards. Her first plays in 1962 were George Bernard Shaw's The shewing up of Blanco Posnet and William Saroyan's Hello Out There. She directed episodes of Siopa an Bhreathnaigh by Niall Tóibín. She went on to direct two plays by Thomas Coffey, She stoops to Conquer by Oliver Goldsmith, and two plays by Micheál Mac Liammóir including his one-man show The Importance of Being Oscar. Gibson's play Inquiry at Lisieux, a play about St Teresa co-written by Adrian Vale was staged during the 1963 Dublin Theatre Festival.

She was appointed head of drama at RTÉ in 1965, holding that position until 1971. She firmly believed that television should showcase Ireland's dramatic tradition, and produced works by Brian Merriman, Brian O'Nolan, Lennox Robinson, Denis Johnston, Seán O'Casey, W. B. Yeats, Violet Florence Martin, and Edith Somerville. She also encouraged new talent, Eoghan Harris, Hugh Leonard, John B. Keane, and Bryan MacMahon. Gibson continued to direct, and was pivotal in bringing Samuel Beckett to the television, with Happy Days and Beginning to End in 1966, featuring Beckett's favourite actor, Jack MacGowran. Due to her own Catholicism she remained respectful of religion, but remained radical regarding social inequality. She oversaw productions dealing with inequality and poverty in Ireland, including the award-winning Week in the Life of Martin Cluxton (1972), a drama about juvenile delinquents.

She is best remembered for RTÉ's long-running soaps, Tolka Row (1964–1968), and The Riordans (1965–1979). Gibson's concern with social issues, Tolka Row dealt with emigration, unemployment, and bankruptcy. The Riordans, was a rural drama, and its use of real locations sparked international interest. In 1972 she was succeeded by Dónall Farmer as head of drama, but continued to direct for RTÉ. Her last work was a 1976 episode of the serial Kilmore House.

A documentary, Born Bolshie, about Gibson's role in the development of Irish television drama was produced by Double Dutch Films for RTÉ. It won a Jacob's Award in 1992.

== Personal life and death ==
Chloe had three husbands: Eric McLeod Gibson, with whom she had two sons, Micheal McLeod Gibson (1920-1988) and John Alan Gibson (1923-1988); Harold Stack; and Robert Brenon. After her retirement from Raidió Teilifís Éireann (RTÉ), she lived in Dublin until her death on 1 January 1995, aged 95.
