= Bob Todd =

English comedy actor (1922–1992)

- Todd on The Benny Hill Show (1971)
- Born: Brian Geoffrey Todd; 15 December 1922; Faversham, Kent, England
- Died: 21 October 1992 (aged 69); Burwash, Sussex, England
- Occupation: Actor
- Spouse: Monica Todd

Brian Geoffrey Todd (15 December 1922 – 21 October 1992), known professionally as Bob Todd, was an English comedy actor, mostly known for appearing as a straight man in the sketch shows of Benny Hill and Spike Milligan. For many years, he lived in Tunbridge Wells, Kent.

== Life and career ==
Todd was born in Faversham, Kent. One of the great stooges of television comedy, Todd was best known for his lugubrious expression and talent for slapstick, and was known to fellow comedians by the nickname 'Silly Todd'.

Before working in television, Todd trained to be a dentist. The outbreak of the Second World War saw him enlist in the Royal Air Force, where he became a navigator stationed at RAF North Killingholme, Lincolnshire. He had ambitions of becoming a farmer—making money from cattle breeding, whilst working as a manager at London Airport. The farming business, once begun, failed and almost made him bankrupt. Meeting scriptwriters Ray Galton and Alan Simpson in a pub, he bluffed them into believing that he was in fact an actor and ended up with the part of a policeman in the Sid James comedy series Citizen James. He appeared as several characters in Milligan and John Antrobus' stage play The Bed-Sitting Room, which opened at the Mermaid Theatre on 31 January 1963.

He subsequently stooged in The Dick Emery Show and The Mike and Bernie Winters Show amongst others, before joining The Benny Hill Show in 1968. He stayed with the programme, on and off, until Thames Television ended the show twenty-one years later. Todd was a regular on the 1971 The Marty Feldman Comedy Machine, appearing in 13 of the 14 episodes. In 1973, he appeared as Bill Thompson, the referee at a regimental boxing tournament in Adolf Hitler: My Part in His Downfall.

Todd gained a reputation for drunkenness while working on The Benny Hill Show. He once failed to turn up for a London Palladium show after a drinking episode, and found himself in a Dublin hospital five days later. After this was reported in the media, Hill had Todd dropped from the show. Producer Dennis Kirkland persuaded Hill to rescind the decision, saying that Todd brought much to the show and his drinking rarely affected his work.

Todd's only starring role was as Dan the lavatory attendant in his own 1972 series In for a Penny, although he did appear in the Jimmy Jewel series Funny Man. He appeared in Eric Sykes's television series, in the episode "Sykes and A Bath", broadcast on 25 January 1961, in series three of Sykes and A..., in which he played a sad-faced man with one hand stuck inside a vase. He appeared in Sykes's film Rhubarb Rhubarb in 1980, as well as making guest appearances on shows by Jim Davidson and Allan Stewart and Spike Milligan's Q9. He was seen in cinema films, including Carry On Again Doctor, The Return of the Musketeers, and Mutiny on the Buses. He appeared in the 1980s series of The Sooty Show playing the part of The Black Hand, in the adventure film The Case of the Black Hand. He appeared in Gabrielle and the Doodleman as Merlin as well as an Ugly Sister with Windsor Davies in 1984.

He was the subject of This Is Your Life in February 1984.

== Personal life ==
Todd and his wife, Monica, had one daughter and two sons. He died at home in the village of Burwash, Sussex (six months after Benny Hill), at the age of 69, from myocardial hypertrophy.

== Filmography ==
=== Film ===
Year	Title	Role	Notes
1961	Raising the Wind	Street Musician - Accordion	Uncredited
1962	Postman's Knock	District Superintendent	
1965	The Intelligence Men	Policeman	Uncredited
1968	Hot Millions	British Commissionaire	Uncredited
1969	Carry On Again Doctor	Patient on Breathing Apparatus	Uncredited
1970	Scars of Dracula	Burgomaster	
1971	She'll Follow You Anywhere	Car Salesman	
1972	Burke & Hare	Guard Campbell	
1972	Mutiny on the Buses	New Inspector	
1972	Go for a Take	Security Man	
1972	Adolf Hitler: My Part in His Downfall	Bill Thompson, Referee	
1973	Digby, the Biggest Dog in the World	The Great Manzini	
1974	Just One More Time	Postman	
1974	The Best of Benny Hill	Various	
1974	The Four Musketeers	Firing Squad Officer	
1975	Confessions of a Pop Performer	Mr Barnwell	
1975	The Ups and Downs of a Handyman	Squire Bullsworthy	
1977	Come Play with Me	Vicar	
1978	Rosie Dixon – Night Nurse	Mr Buchanan	
1979	Le Pétomane	Joseph's Father	Short
1983	Superman III	Dignified Gent	
1984	Gabrielle and the Doodleman	Merlin/Ugly Sister	
1989	The Return of the Musketeers	High Bailiff	

=== Television ===
Year	Title	Role	Notes
1960-1962	Citizen James	Policeman	10 episodes
1961-1962	It's a Square World	Various	
1962-1970	Comedy Playhouse	Various	3 episodes
1968-1976; 1980-1989	The Benny Hill Show	Various	
1968-1970	Please Sir!	Boating Lake Attendant/Bus Conductor	2 episodes
1970	Here Come the Double Deckers!	Workman/War Film Director	2 episodes
1971-1972	The Dick Emery Show	Various	4 episodes
1972-1973	The Fenn Street Gang	Percival Pollard/Waiter	2 episodes
1973	On the Buses	Mr Simpson	Episode: "Friends in High Places"
1974	Doctor at Sea	Cyril, Entertainments Officer	4 episodes
1980	The Sooty Show	The Black Hand	Episode: "The Case of the Black Hand"
1980	Funny Man	Billy Strothers	6 episodes
1984	The Steam Video Company	Various	6 episodes
1991	Benny Hill's World Tour: New York!	Various	1 episode
1992	Freddie Starr	Various	1 episode
