= The Diary of Samuel Pepys =

British television series

- Genre: Historical drama
- Written by: A.R. Rawlinson
- Starring: Peter Sallis; Douglas Wilmer
- Composer: Christopher Whelen
- Country of origin: United Kingdom
- Original language: English
- No. of series: 1
- No. of episodes: 14

Production
- Producer: Chloe Gibson
- Production company: BBC

Original release
- Network: BBC 1
- Release: 7 March – 13 June 1958

The Diary of Samuel Pepys is a British fourteen-part historical television series which was originally broadcast on the BBC in 1958. Based on the diaries of the naval administrator Samuel Pepys, it portrays life at the court of Charles II from the year 1660 to 1669.

== Cast ==
- Peter Sallis as Samuel Pepys, English diarist
- Susan Maryott as Elizabeth Pepys, the wife of Samuel Pepys
- Alan Rowe as William Hewer
- Douglas Wilmer as King Charles II
- David Peel as the Duke of York
- Diana Fairfax as Lady Castlemaine
- Manning Wilson as Lord Sandwich
- Paul Eddington as Sir William Coventry
- John Arnatt as the Duke of Albemarle
- Anthony Newlands as Sir William Penn
- John Sharplin as John Evelyn
- Howard Lamb as William Bowyer
- Raymond Rollett as Sir John Minnes
- Frederick Peisley as John Pepys, the father of Samuel Pepys
- Jill Carey as the Duchess of York
- Robert James as the Duke of Buckingham and Father of Child
- Wensley Pithey as Viscount Brouncker
- Patricia Heneghan as Pall Pepys, the sister of Samuel Pepys
- John Dunbar as the Bishop of London and Master Wren

== Plot ==
The series debuted on Friday 7 March 1958 and the series was based on the diaries of Samuel Pepys from the age of 27 to 36. The series portrays life at the court of Charles II from 1660 to 1669. With 162 speaking parts, The Diary of Samuel Pepys was one of the largest BBC productions to date.

== Review ==
This series was Peter Sallis's first appearance as a principal character on television as well as his first extended television role. A reason for this was that he bore a resemblance when compared to contemporary picture portraits of Samuel Pepys. The series was dramatised by A R Rawlinson for Chloe Gibson. Chloe Gibson was one of the first female producers for BBC television.

Using the diaries as a template, Sallis captured the wit, verve and cheeky humour of Pepys and was lauded for his performance.

Peter Sallis later recalled saying that the BBC's live adaptation of The Diary of Samuel Pepys was one of the most demanding and extraordinary experiences of his early career. He recalled being surprised when producer Chloe Gibson chose him for the title role, admitting he didn’t initially grasp the scale of the undertaking. The production involved thirteen live half‑hour episodes performed in Studio D at Lime Grove, with multiple sets arranged around the studio and only a few large, cumbersome cameras. From Sallis’s perspective, the experience was a mixture of exhilaration and chaos. Because the series was framed as Pepys’s own diary, he appeared in almost every scene and spent much of each broadcast sprinting between sets, relying on tricks like a cheerful “ha, ha, ha” entrance to cover his breathlessness. He remembered the camaraderie of the cast — including Paul Eddington, Alan Rowe and Douglas Wilmer — and the constant pressure of live television, illustrated by moments such as bursting into a funeral scene with an inappropriately jolly greeting after a frantic dash across the studio.

== Episodes ==
The series was a 14 episode part series that ran from 7 March 1958 - 13 June 1958 on BBC Television with each episode being 30 minutes long. Out of all 14 episodes produced for the series, episodes 1, 7, 8 and 13 are available to watch on TV Brain. As for the other 10 episodes from the series it's believed they are now missing.

No.	Title	Original release date
1	"The Diary of Samuel Pepys: Episode One"	7 March 1958
Samuel Pepys begans his famous diary and records a bonfire celebration happening in Westminster in 1660, marking General Monk's arrival as well as the restoration of the monarchy.
2	"The Diary of Samuel Pepys: Episode 2"	14 March 1958
Samuel Pepys sets sail on the HMS Naseby ship to bring King Charles II back from the exile during the year 1660.
3	"The Diary of Samuel Pepys: Episode 3"	21 March 1958
King Charles II is going through restoration, meanwhile Samuel Pepys is serving as a naval administrator, socialized in the taverns, and is also participating in the restoration of King Charles II.
4	"The Diary of Samuel Pepys: Episode 4"	28 March 1958
During April of 1661, Samuel Pepys attends King Charles II's coronation to witness a grand procession of bishops, noblemen, and other dignitaries in Westminster Abbey.
5	"The Diary of Samuel Pepys: Episode 5"	11 April 1958
In 1663 Samuel Pepys observes the court life of King Charles II's bride Queen Catherine of Braganza while she's ill.
6	"The Diary of Samuel Pepys: Episode 6"	18 April 1958
Samuel Pepys becomes deeply concerned about Lord Sandwich when he has an affair with a young woman in Chelsea, which ends up leading to a temporary rift in their relationship.
7	"The Diary of Samuel Pepys: Episode 7"	25 April 1958
During March of 1665 Samuel Pepys gets actively involved in preparing the English fleet for a war, following King Charles II's orders to ready the navy with the Dutch.
8	"The Diary of Samuel Pepys: Episode 8"	2 May 1958
With the outbreak of the Second Anglo-Dutch War between England and Holland, Lord Sandwich leads the English fleet during the early stages of the war. Meanwhile Samuel Pepys gets deeply involved in the naval administration in June 1665.
9	"The Diary of Samuel Pepys: Episode 9"	9 May 1958
It is September of 1665 and Lord Sandwich is still at sea fighting the Dutch. Meanwhile Samuel Pepys is managing naval logistics at the London docks, overseeing prize goods, provisioning the fleet, and coordinating care for the sick sailors and prisoners. At the same he finds out that the court and some people from the Navy Board have fled.
10	"The Diary of Samuel Pepys: Episode 10"	16 May 1958
During January of 1666, Samuel Pepys becomes actively engaged in naval administration and political maneuvering across Hampton Court in the City of London, and at the Whitehall Palace. Around the same time period Lord Sandwich has returned from the sea with valuable Dutch prizes.
11	"The Diary of Samuel Pepys: Episode 11"	23 May 1958
Samuel Pepys responded to Lord Sandwich's disgrace by carefully navigating political tensions, and continuing his work as a naval administrator during their joint command of the Royal Navy fleet led by the Duke of Albemarle and Prince Rupert partly during September of 1666, but things then go downhill when the Great Fire of London breaks out.
12	"The Diary of Samuel Pepys: Episode 12"	30 May 1958
In February of 1667, Samuel Pepys continues working for the Navy Office in Seething Lane, which had been spared by the great fire while London is still trying to recover from the devastation. At the same time Samuel ends up suffering from professional pressure, political anxiety, and personal unease.
13	"The Diary of Samuel Pepys: Episode 13"	6 June 1958
After peace has been negotiated with the Dutch, following the naval disaster when the Dutch fleet sailed up the Medway and burned the English ships at their moorings, Samuel Pepys visits Westminster Hall in February of 1668 as part of his deep duties involvement in the post-war naval administration.
14	"The Diary of Samuel Pepys: Final episode"	13 June 1958
In January 1669, Samuel Pepys successfully manages to defended the Navy Board before Parliament and won great renown. Although his eyesight starts to fail and he decides to stop writing his diary. He also try's to mend his love life to save his marriage with Elisabeth Pepys.

== Reception ==
=== Critical response ===
The Daily Echo, praised the series for its storytelling and its cast. He also called it one of the best of BBC serials.

Robert Graham of the Western Mail, described the series as "opulently produced", with scripts that avoided being falsely historical. He also praised the series for the performances of Peter Sallis, David Peel and Manning Wilson.

== See also ==
- "Pepys' Diary", a 1958 song by Benny Hill

== Bibliography ==
- Baskin, Ellen . Serials on British Television, 1950-1994. Scolar Press, 1996.
