= Pepys' Diary (song) =

1961 song performed by Benny Hill

Song by Benny Hill
- A-side: "Gather in the Mushrooms"
- Released: 1961
- Genre: Pop
- Length: 3:11
- Label: Pye
- Songwriter: Benny Hill
- Producer: Tony Hatch

"Pepys' Diary" is a comic song written and performed by Benny Hill. Written to spoof the then-current TV series The Diary of Samuel Pepys, it was one of Hill's favourites amongst his compositions. Hill performed it on his show The Benny Hill Show in 1958, 1971 and 1989.

The song has a suitably restoration-style arrangement with harpsichord and woodwind. It begins with the verse:

"A shy young maid has took a room down at the village inn
Her bedside light is oh-so-bright and the curtains oh-so-thin
She enters the room at nine o'clock, at half-past nine she sleeps
Lord Clarendon walks quickly on, but naughty Samuel peeps"

Hill then goes on to recount various innuendo-laden adventures of Samuel Pepys, insisting "Yes, we know it's right / It's in black and white / And it's all written down in his diary.""

The song appeared as the B-side of Hill's top-12 hit "Gather in the Mushrooms".
