= Penny Meredith =

British actress

- Occupations: Film actor Television actor
- Years active: 1972 - 1983

Penny Meredith is a British actress.

== Filmography ==
- The Flesh and Blood Show (1972)
- Go for a Take (1972)
- The Best of Benny Hill (1974)
- The Ups and Downs of a Handyman (1975)
- Confessions from a Holiday Camp (1977)
- Night Train to Murder (1983)

== Television roles ==
- Man at the Top
- The Benny Hill Show
