= Rendezvous in Paris =

Rendezvous in Paris may refer to:

- Rendezvous in Paris (1947 film), a French film directed by Gilles Grangier
- Rendezvous in Paris (1982 film), a French-German film directed by Gabi Kubach
- Rendezvous in Paris (1995 film), a French film directed by Éric Rohmer
