= Freddie Wiles =

British actor (1914–1983)

- Born: Robert Frederick Wiles; 20 November 1914; Southwark, London, England
- Died: Between 1 April and 30 June 1983 (aged 68); Rotherham, South Yorkshire, England
- Occupation: Actor

Robert Frederick Wiles (20 November 1914 – Between 1 April and 30 June 1983), known as Freddie Wiles, was a British actor best known for playing Goddard in Are You Being Served?. However, he was only credited for this part in season 5 episode 7. He also appeared in one episode as Mr. Clampton, the porter.

== Biography ==
Freddie Wiles was born Robert Frederick Wiles on 20 November 1914 in London, England.

He also appeared in other shows such as Dad's Army, Doctor in Charge, Doomwatch, The Benny Hill Show, Oh Brother! and Doctor Who.

Wiles died between 1 April and 30 June (Note: FreeBMD lists dates by quarter.) 1983 at the age of 68 in Rotherham, South Yorkshire, England.
