= Ken Sedd =

English actor (1939–2021)

- Born: Kenneth Alan Seddington; 26 October 1939; Heston, Middlesex, England
- Died: 9 January 2021 (aged 81); Camberley, Surrey, England
- Occupation(s): Actor; stuntman
- Spouse: Innis Rockall (1965–2021; his death)

Kenneth Alan Seddington (26 October 1939 – 9 January 2021), better known as Ken Sedd, was an English character actor, best known for his various comedic roles in the sketches on The Benny Hill Show from 1969 to 1984. Sedd was also a professional stuntman, performing stunts for Benny Hill over the course of 25 years.

== Life and career ==
Sedd was born in October 1939 in Heston, Middlesex as Kenneth Alan Seddington. His best known roles were in the sketches on the long-running series The Benny Hill Show. Other notables appearances included Softly Softly, Adam Adamant Lives! and Doctor Who.

Sedd died in Camberley, Surrey on 9 January 2021, at the age of 81. He was survived by his wife and three children.

== Selected filmography ==
- The Benny Hill Show (1969–1984) – various roles
- The Two Ronnies (1982) – Edgar Whitlow
- Whoops Apocalypse (1982) – Liberace
- Doctor Who (1968–1980) – various roles
- Upstairs, Downstairs (1974) – Saxophonist
- Doomwatch (1970–1972) – various roles
- Z-Cars (1971) – various roles
- Softly Softly (1968) – PC Evans
- Adam Adamant Lives! (1966–1967) – various roles
