= Bettina Le Beau =

Belgian actress (1932–2015)

Bettine Le Beau
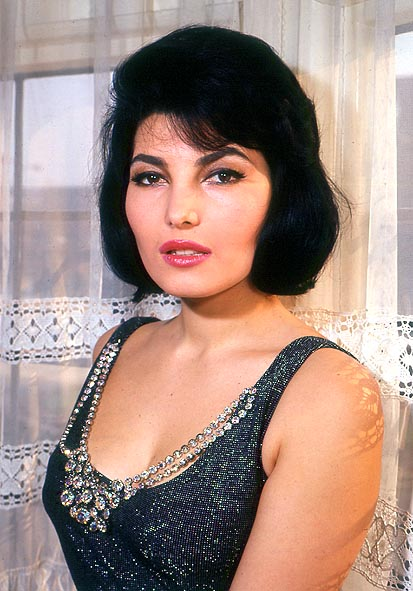
- Le Beau in c. 1963
- Born: 23 March 1932; Antwerp, Belgium
- Died: 8 September 2015 (aged 83); Finchley, London, England, UK
- Occupations: Actress and writer
- Years active: 1959-1987
- Spouse(s): Peter Lebow (? - ?) (2 children); Harry Michaels

Bettina Le Beau (23 March 1932 – 8 September 2015), also known as Bettine Le Beau, was a Belgian actress known for her film, radio and television appearances in the UK.

== Life ==
During the Second World War, Le Beau was separated from her parents; as she was Jewish, and was held in a concentration camp in southern France. Le Beau escaped from Camp DeGurs and was helped by a family who hid her from the Nazis. Le Beau went to Britain in 1945 and attended Pitman's College. She worked as a model, graphologist and cabaret artist and learned several languages.

As an actress her television appearances include The Benny Hill Show, Mrs Thursday, The Prisoner, Call My Bluff and The Golden Shot. Film appearances include My Last Duchess, San Ferry Ann, The Devil's Daffodil and an uncredited role as Professor Dent's secretary in the first James Bond film, Dr. No. On radio, Le Beau was a regular on the BBC World Service programme Animal, Vegetable, Mineral?, a version of Twenty Questions.

Le Beau worked on a programme for women on radio and wrote a book entitled Help Yourself to Happiness (ISBN 0953421600), and also lectured on her experience of The Holocaust.

== Selected filmography ==
- The Trunk (1961) - Maria
- Dentist on the Job (1961) - Judith Dobbin
- The Devil's Daffodil (1961) - Trudi Mahler (uncredited)
- Village of Daughters (1962) - Alisa Marcio (A Daughter)
- Dr. No (1962) - Prof. Dent's Secretary (uncredited)
- The Counterfeit Constable (1964) - French Lady The Likley Lads (1964) (credited)
- San Ferry Ann (1965) - French War Museum Attendant
- That Riviera Touch (1966) - French Lady at Casino (uncredited)
- The Magnificent Two (1967) - Telephonist (uncredited)
- The Best of Benny Hill (1974) - Various Roles
- Sleeping Beauty (1987) - 2nd Spinning Woman (final film role)
