= Barry Stokes (actor) =

British actor

- Occupation: Actor
- Years active: 1964–1985

Barry Stokes (born 1948) is a British actor.

His film credits include: Juan Antonio Bardem's The Corruption of Chris Miller, The Ups and Downs of a Handyman, Prey, Outer Touch, Hawk the Slayer, Rendezvous in Paris and Enemy Mine.

His television appearances include: Tom Brown's Schooldays (as Brooke), Dixon of Dock Green, Z-Cars, UFO, Space: 1999, Survivors, The Professionals and Reilly, Ace of Spies.

== Filmography ==
- Doomwatch (1971, TV) as Stephen Franklin
- Tom Brown's Schooldays (1971) as Brooke
- The Corruption of Chris Miller (1973) as Barney Webster
- Space: 1999 (1975, TV) as Jim Haines
- Jackanory Playhouse (1975, TV) as Nick Sutler
- The Ups and Downs of a Handyman (1975) as Bob
- The Prince and the Pauper (1976, TV) as Miles Hendon
- Prey (1977) as Anders
- Lady Oscar (1979) as André Grandier
- Outer Touch (1979) as Oliver
- Hammer House of Horror (1980, TV; episode "Carpathian Eagle") as 1st Victim
- Hawk the Slayer (1980) as Axe Man 2
- The Guns and the Fury (1981) as Paul Halders
- Rendezvous in Paris (1982) as Frank Davis
- Fanny Hill (1983) as Charles
- Reilly: Ace of Spies (1983, TV) as Cromie
- The Last Days of Pompeii (1984, TV) as Gar
- Romance on the Orient Express (1985, TV) as Flavio
- Enemy Mine (1985) as Huck

== Personal life ==
Stokes is married to actor Gay Soper. They had a son, Matthew Stokes (1976–2009), who was also an actor.
