= Cherri Gilham =

British actor and photojournalist (born 1944)

- Born: 31 December 1944 (age 81)
- Other names: Cheryl Gilham; Cherry Gilham; Cheryl G DeMille
- Occupations: Retired actress; writer; photographer; video producer

Cherri Gilham (born 31 December 1944), also known as Cheryl Gilham, Cherry Gilham, and Cheryl G DeMille, is a former comedy actress who was one of the first "Page 3" girls and is now a writer, musician and video producer.

== Biography ==
=== Modelling and acting career ===
Cherri Gilham appeared often on "Page 3" in the Daily Mirror and The Sun from 1972 to 1975. She worked with many of the top UK comedians in the 1970s including Benny Hill, Dick Emery, The Two Ronnies, Frankie Howerd, Jimmy Tarbuck, Dave Allen, Mike Yarwood, and Bernie Winters. She was also a hostess on some TV shows, including Maid of the Month for several months on The Golden Shot and The Sky's the Limit with Hughie Green. She also appeared as herself in the 1980 documentary short The Great British Striptease, hosted by Bernard Manning in Blackpool. Her film roles included sex comedies such as The Love Box (1972), Confessions of a Sex Maniac (1974), and Girls Come First (1975).

In the 1970s, Gilham contributed sketches to the Benny Hill Show and Ronnie Barker. In 1976, she was part of a band formed by music mogul Peter Collins called Madison. They were signed to Magnet Records which was owned by Michael Levy now Lord Levy, and released a single titled "Let It Ring". The song reached 54 in the charts.

In 1965, Cherri Gilham danced behind a screen on Top of the Pops. She also made her first acting appearance in "On the Braden Beat" in a skit with Bernard Braden. She featured in an episode of As Time Goes By in 1992 with Judi Dench. She has appeared in numerous TV and radio programmes and in the media in subjects covering Page 3, mistresses, child abuse and The Fluffy Club.

In 1991, Gilham turned to photography and photojournalism. She has taken portraits (photographic and written) of Clive Anderson, Oliver Reed, Penn Jillette (of Penn & Teller) and Peter Stringfellow for various publications.

She photographed the Marquess of Bath for his first inclusion in Hello Magazine and wrote the interview.

=== Writing ===
Gilham's professional writing career took flight in The Guardian newspaper in 1993 when she unceremoniously dumped her then boyfriend, the Marquess of Bath, in a column in that newspaper.

She then went on to write further articles for The Guardian, The Observer, Daily Mirror, Sunday People, Evening Standard and became a regular contributor to the Daily Mail, chronicling her former life as a Page 3 girl, her times as a private detective in the 1960s and 1990s, seeing John Lennon smoke his first joint, and her relationships with various comedians.

=== Activism ===
In 1997 Gilham founded The Fluffy Club, a joke women's movement to help women stop being strident and emasculating men. It was supposed to be an antidote to the Spice Girls who were proclaiming at the time that girls were better than boys. She was severely lambasted by feminists who thought she was damaging their cause and who objected to her suggestion of using feminine wiles to get things from men. She coined the word 'Fluffragette', (a supporter of the Fluffy Club), which has now entered an English dictionary. She wrote a regular column called "Cherri's Secret Diary" in Hot Gossip e-zine in which she championed the innocence of Colin Stagg, who had been accused of the murder of Rachel Nickell on Wimbledon Common in 1992. He has since been exonerated.

In May 2005, Gilham stood against Prime Minister Tony Blair in his Sedgefield constituency as a candidate for the Pensioners Party on an anti-war ticket. On election night, she stood on the platform next to Tony Blair wearing a hat which said "BLIAR". Blair was oblivious to this for 20 minutes whilst the world's press were capturing the moment. The picture went round the world and became The Guardian's iconic picture for May 2005.

=== Personal life ===
Gilham has one son, Marcus Veda.

Gilham is writing her memoirs, which she is entitling Menoirs, as it is about some of the men in her life and their importance to her emotional and spiritual growth. She is considering having it published posthumously. As Cheryl G DeMille, she is now making short documentary films
