= Gather in the Mushrooms =

Single by Benny Hill
- B-side: "Pepys' Diary"
- Released: 1961
- Genre: Pop
- Length: 2:34
- Label: Pye
- Composer: Benny Hill
- Producer: Tony Hatch

Benny Hill singles chronology
"Gather in the Mushrooms" (1961)	"Transistor Radio" (1961)

"Gather in the Mushrooms" is a comedy song by Benny Hill, recorded and released by Pye Records in 1961, under the production of Tony Hatch. It reached #12 on the UK Singles Chart. It was covered by Bogshed on a John Peel session in October 1985. Its B-side was "Pepys' Diary.
