= The Corruption of Chris Miller =

1973 Spanish film by Juan Antonio Bardem

- Spanish theatrical poster
- Directed by: Juan Antonio Bardem
- Written by: Santiago Moncada
- Produced by: Xavier Armet
- Starring: Jean Seberg; Marisol; Barry Stokes
- Cinematography: Juan Gelpí
- Edited by: Emilio Rodríguez
- Music by: Waldo de los Ríos
- Production company: Xavier Armet P.C.
- Distributed by: Warner Bros.
- Release date: 17 May 1973 (Madrid)
- Running time: 107 minutes
- Country: Spain
- Language: English

The Corruption of Chris Miller (Spanish: La corrupción de Chris Miller) is a 1973 Spanish psychological horror film directed by Juan Antonio Bardem and starring Jean Seberg, Marisol, and Barry Stokes. The film follows a woman and her stepdaughter who come to suspect a handyman they have recently hired is responsible for a rash of violent murders in their small mountain community. Marisol's first film in which she does not perform musical numbers. The only brief exception is a moment in which the three protagonists perform a verse of the song Au clair de la lune on guitar, in which Marisol sings a single verse. The film was Marisol's first film apart from Manuel Goyanes. Anabel Films founder and producer, actor Javier Armet, developed an original idea from Santiago Montcada to produce this high-budget, international film (number 7 in the USA). It was filmed outdoors in Comillas (Cantabria) and Las Fraguas (Cantabria) and indoors at Isasi Isasmendi's Esplugas Films Studios in Esplugas de Llobregat (Barcelona).

The film was released in some English-speaking countries under the alternate titles Behind the Shutters and Sisters of Corruption.

== Plot ==
In a rural mountain community in Spain, a woman allows a drifter to briefly stay in her home in her husband's absence. When she orders the man—who has playfully dressed himself with a Charlie Chaplin mask from the home, obscuring his face—to leave, he brutally stabs her to death.

Meanwhile, teenage Christine "Chris" Miller is recovering from a nervous breakdown she suffered following a violent rape, the trauma of which was only compounded after her father abandoned her and her American stepmother, Ruth. Recently discharged from a psychiatric institution, Chris has gone to live with Ruth in their large country home. Shortly after, Barney Webster, a young and charismatic drifter, is discovered sleeping in the barn by Ruth. She initially orders him to leave, but soon finds herself charmed by him. Ruth ultimately allows Barney to stay on the property and work for her as a handyman.

Barney begins to seduce Chris, while also making romantic advances toward Ruth. Meanwhile, Chris is tormented by fragmented memories of her rape, which occurred in her school's communal showers. Whenever she hears a storm or running water, Chris suffers traumatic flashbacks. Barney witnesses one of Chris's flashbacks in the basement of the home during a rainstorm, and observes her as she goes into an incoherent state, lashing out violently with a knife. Ruth blames Barney for Chris's fit, and forces him out of the house at gunpoint into the night.

Shortly after, a mysterious man arrives at the farm of a nearby family, dressed in a black rain shawl, and steals a sickle from the barn. The young son of the family mistakes the man for a monk, and unlocks the front door for him. The man proceeds to hack the family to death one by one, first the parents, then the youngest boy's teenage brother and sister, before ultimately killing the young child as well. The following morning, Ruth and Chris see news footage of the murders, and immediately suspect Barney.

That night, Barney breaks into the Millers' home. Ruth awakens and alerts Chris, who goes to investigate. The two end up having sex in Chris's bedroom, but the encounter drives Chris into another off her flashbacks, and, in a rage, she stabs Barney in the back with a knife from her nightstand. Ruth, assuming Barney to be the murderer, joins in, also stabbing him multiple times in the back and chest. A nude Barney stumbles through the house, falling down the staircase, and ultimately dies of his wounds. Ruth and Chris clarify their story, framing the murder as a self-defense killing. En route to the police station, the women learn that the murderer has been apprehended, and realize to their horror that Barney was not the killer.

Ruth and Chris return home, and begin rummaging through Barney's belongings. They discover that he was recently released from prison, and that he was an acquaintance of Chris's father. Ruth surmises that Chris's father sent him to surveil the women and abscond from the house with a cache of pearls and other family heirlooms. Later that night, Ruth and Chris bury Barney's corpse at a construction site where a road is being built. The women watch from a distance the following morning as the crew pave over the location where Barney's body has been hidden. A short time later, while Ruth and Chris lounge by the swimming pool, the construction crew notice a sinkhole in the road, and begin digging it up.

== Cast ==
- Jean Seberg as Ruth Miller
- Marisol as Chris Miller
- Barry Stokes as Barney Webster
- Perla Cristal as Perla
- Rudy Gaebel as Lewis
- Gérard Tichy as Commissioner
- Alicia Altabella as Adela
- Mariano Vidal Molina as Ernesto
- María Bardem as Maria
- Juan Antonio Bardem as Pedro
- Miguel Bardem as Tin
- Gustavo Re as Shopkeeper
- Carl Rapp as TV Reporter
- Goyo Lebrero as Peasant
- Antonio Parra as Postman

== Release ==
The Corruption of Chris Miller was released in Madrid on 17 May 1973. The film was released regionally in the United States under the alternate title Behind the Shutters in 1976, and in the United Kingdom as Sisters of Corruption. It later opened in New York City under its original The Corruption of Chris Miller title on 30 November 1979, three months after Jean Seberg's death.

Though shot in English, a version was also released with a Spanish-language dub.

== Sources ==
- Bentley, Bernard P. E. (2008). A Companion to Spanish Cinema. Rochester, New York: Boydell & Brewer. ISBN 978-1-855-66176-9.
- Coates-Smith, Michael; McGee, Gary (2014). The Films of Jean Seberg. Jefferson, North Carolina: McFarland. ISBN 978-0-786-49022-6.
- De España, Rafael (1994). Directory of Spanish and Portuguese Film-makers and Films. Santa Barbara, California: Greenwood Press. ISBN 978-0-313-29459-4.
- Willis, Andrew (2003). "Spanish horror and the flight from 'art' cinema, 1967–73". In Jancovich, Mark; Reboli, Antonio Lázaro; Stringer, Julian; Willis, Andrew (eds.). Defining Cult Movies: The Cultural Politics of Oppositional Tastes. Manchester: Manchester University Press. pp. 71–83. ISBN 978-0-719-06631-3.
