= Harvest of Love =

Single by Benny Hill
- Released: 1963
- Length: 2:22
- Label: Pye
- Songwriter(s): Benny Hill, Tony Hatch

Benny Hill singles chronology
"Transistor Radio" (1961)	"Harvest of Love" (1963)	"Ernie (The Fastest Milkman in the West)" (1971)

"The Harvest Of Love" is a short comedy song, co-written and originally performed by Benny Hill, released on Pye Records (7N.15520). The other writer was shown as "M. Anthony", a pseudonym for the producer, Tony Hatch. The song was a #20 hit in the UK Singles Chart in 1963, and has appeared on several compilation albums as well as being covered by the Wurzels. The Benny Hill version was flipped with another Hill composition, "BAMba 3688". The record also saw a U.S. release on Rust (5079).

The song is sung from the point of view of a farmhand who has fallen in love (or at least, lust) with a young lady. Hill's vocals were accompanied by the Kestrels, who instead of singing, provided a vocal back-up of farmyard impressions. The accompaniment was directed by Hatch. The Kestrels at that time were Roger Greenaway, Tony Burrows, Jeff Williams, and Roger Gullane.

The lyrics included such lines as:

"And as the horse and I plough the field nearby,
Your memory I can't erase,
For while I walk at the rear of the horse, my dear,
I seem to see your face."

At the end of the song it turns out that the narrator is already married.

In September 2013, the original pressing of the single was found in private storage and sold for £10 at auction on the ITV daytime series Storage Hoarders.
