= Night Train to Murder =

1984 British television comedy film by Joseph McGrath

- DVD cover
- Written by: Eric Morecambe; Ernie Wise; Joseph McGrath
- Directed by: Joseph McGrath
- Starring: Morecambe and Wise
- Original language: English

Production
- Running time: 89 minutes
- Production company: Thames Television

Original release
- Network: ITV
- Release: 3 January 1984

Night Train to Murder is a one-off 1984 feature-length British television comedy drama, directed by Joseph McGrath and starring Morecambe and Wise. It was the last work that Eric Morecambe and Ernie Wise worked on together before Morecambe's death in 1984; he was in poor health at the time of filming. It was written as a pastiche of the works of writers including Agatha Christie and Edgar Wallace and is set in 1946, featuring Morecambe and Wise ostensibly as 1940s versions of themselves.

The duo's move from the BBC to Thames in 1978 was a much publicised media event, and one of the main reasons for their move was to make films and move away from the format of The Morecambe & Wise Show that had proved so popular in the previous decade. The film was completed in March 1983, but not screened until after Morecambe's death the following year. It was originally made with a laughter track, but this was absent when broadcast, and again so when later released on both VHS and DVD.

The film features a plot of family members dying in strange circumstances and the two leads are drawn into this when Eric's niece Kathy (Lysette Anthony) is visited by the family's lawyer, played by Fulton Mackay. It was made largely on location, produced on videotape and was originally broadcast on ITV on 3 January 1985. The closing moments of the film see Eric and Ernie walking off together, onto the next gig, making it their final screen image together.

== Cast ==
- Eric Morecambe as Eric Morecambe
- Ernie Wise as Ernie Wise
- Margaret Courtenay as Dame Flora
- Kenneth Haigh as Cousin Milton / Cousin Homer
- Fulton Mackay as Mackay
- Pamela Salem as Cousin Zelda
- Lysette Anthony as Kathy Chalmers
- Roger Brierley as Chief Superintendent Rivers
- Edward Judd as Knife Thrower
- Ben Aris as Theatre Manager
- Tony Boncza as Joe
- Frank Coda as Stage Manager
- Mike Crane as Big Jim
- Robert Longden as Vicar
- Penny Meredith as Mrs. Manzini
- Tim Stern as Tiny Big Jim
- Richard Vernon as Uncle Felix

== Reception ==
Richard Last, reviewing for The Daily Telegraph, wrote "I would have preferred to keep my memories of the great Morecambe and Wise partnership without the help of Thames's dismal Night Train to Murder... Very, very occasionally the old Eric and Ernie magic peeped out. Mostly it was smothered". Philip Purser in The Sunday Telegraph described the film as "a desperate parody of pre-war English thrillers". John Oliver in Screenonline calls it "lumbering, poorly filmed, unfunny". Patrick Stoddart for The Sunday Times was more favourable: "an elegant, underplayed, witty little gem... conclusive proof that Morecambe and Wise were quite simply the most proficient comedians of the age".
