= Jenny Lee-Wright =

British actress and dancer (born 1947)

- Born: 21 February 1947 (age 78); London, England
- Occupations: Actress; dancer; Foley artist
- Years active: 1962–present

Jenny Lee-Wright (born 21 February 1947) is a British actress and dancer who later became a Foley artist.

She changed her professional name from Jenny Lee Wright to Jenny Lee-Wright around the time she left Lionel Blair and His Dancers and began her acting career, to avoid confusion with an already established actress of that time, Jennifer Wright.

At age 16, she left school to train with the Ballet Rambert. Within a year, she became part of a French cabaret group that traveled the world. Upon returning to England, she joined Lionel Blair's dance troupe, and then turned to acting, appearing with such comedians as Morecambe and Wise, Dick Emery, Spike Milligan (in his Q series), Frankie Howerd, Tommy Cooper and, in particular, Benny Hill. Her work with Hill earned her the nickname 'The Sexiest Stooge'.

Other television appearances included The Golden Shot, The Protectors and Masterspy (as Miss Moneypacker).

In 1970, she made her film debut in John Cassavetes's Husbands, in which she played the role of Pearl Billingham.

Other films included Michael Apted's Triple Echo (1972) and the Amicus production Madhouse (1974).

She began to work as a Foley artist in the 1970s between acting jobs, and in a 1976 magazine interview attributed her sense of timing in that field to her training as a dancer. Wright stood in as the hostess on Bruce Forsyth's Generation Game for several weeks when regular hostess Anthea Redfern was absent on maternity leave. By the late 1980s, she had switched completely to Foley work, including such films as My Left Foot (1989), Shakespeare in Love (1998), Muppet Treasure Island (1996), the James Bond movie Die Another Day (2002), and The Phantom of the Opera (2004) based on the Andrew Lloyd Webber musical.

== TV credits ==
Year	Title	Role
1964	Crossroads	Vicky Wade
1965–1968	The Bruce Forsyth Show	
1968	The Benny Hill Show (BBC)	Various
1968–1977	The Morecambe & Wise Show	Various
1970–72, 1976–80, 1982–86	The Benny Hill Show (ITV)	Various
1971	The Laughing Stock of Television (TV film)	
1971	Paul Temple	Jacky
1971	Jason King; Episode: 'A Page Before Dying'	First Girl
1972	Engelbert with the Young Generation	Dancer
1972	The Protectors; Episode: 'Ceremony for the Dead'	Julie
1972	Sez Les	
1972	Emmerdale Farm	Lynn
1973	Public Eye; Episode: 'A Family Affair'	Mrs Sullivan
1973	Harriet's Back in Town	Jo
1974	Marty Back Together Again (TV series)	Various
1974	BBC Play of the Month; Episode: 'The Deep Blue Sea'	Club hostess
1974	The Campbells Are Coming (TV film)	Various
1974–1975	A Little Bit of Wisdom	Marge/Lolita
1974–1975	The Tommy Cooper Hour	
1975	Love Thy Neighbour	Marilyn
1975	Tarbuck and All That!	
1976	Des O'Connor Entertains	
1977	Beryl's Lot	Mildred
1977	Masterspy	Miss Moneypacker
1977–1978	Mike Yarwood in Persons	
1978	The Professionals; Episode: 'The Rack'	Lorna
1978	Bernie	
1979	Minder; Episode: 'A Tethered Goat'	Frankie
1982	The Jim Davidson Show	
1985	The Funny Side	
1986	Mind Your Language	Maria Papandrious

== Filmography ==
Year	Title	Role
1970	Husbands	Pearl Billingham
1972	The Triple Echo	Christine
1974	The Best of Benny Hill	Various
1974	Madhouse	Carol Clayton
1976	The Slipper and the Rose	Milk Maid
1977	What'll you Have? (short)	
