= The Flumps =

1977 British stop-motion animated TV series

- Genre: Stop motion
- Created by: Julie Holder
- Country of origin: United Kingdom
- Original language: English
- No. of series: 1
- No. of episodes: 13

Production
- Running time: 15 mins

Original release
- Network: BBC1
- Release: 14 February – 9 May 1977

The Flumps is an animated television series, created and written by Julie Holder, and produced for the BBC by David Yates. The show was first broadcast by the BBC in 1977.

== Overview ==
The plot revolved around the various adventures of a family of furry characters called The Flumps. It was created and written by Julie Holder and narrated by Gay Soper. The theme tune was played by George Chisholm on the trombone.

In 1978, the BBC released a record, The Flumps (REC 309), that had 4 stories from the TV series narrated and sung by Gay Soper: "Keep Fit", "Balloons", "Moon Shot" and "Something Different".

In 2000, The Flumps was released on DVD. During early 2008, the theme tune was used in a series of adverts for Auto Trader magazine in the UK.

== Characters ==
The various flumps were:

- Grandfather Flump, who played the Flumpet (Note: This is a made-up instrument which looked a bit like a watering can crossed with a gramophone horn and sounded a lot like a low, valved brass instrument, like a Euphonium. It is not to be confused with the actual, real-life instrument, the Flumpet, which is a cross between a flugelhorn and trumpet.)
- Father Flump, a keen gardener
- Mother Flump, often seen cooking in the kitchen
- Posie, a girl Flump
- Perkin, a boy Flump
- Pootle, the toddler Flump

== Episodes ==
No.	Title	Original release date
1	"Secrets"	14 February 1977
2	"The Cloud"	21 February 1977
3	"The Magnet"	28 February 1977
4	"Get Your Skates On"	7 March 1977
5	"Moon Shot"	14 March 1977
6	"Balloons"	21 March 1977
7	"Keep Fit"	28 March 1977
8	"Something Different"	4 April 1977
9	"Lend a Hand"	11 April 1977
10	"Quiet Please"	18 April 1977
11	"Grandfather's Birthday"	25 April 1977
12	"What a Carrot"	2 May 1977
13	"Where's Grandfather?"	9 May 1977

== Scheduling ==
The Flumps was shown 21 times between 1977 and 1988, usually around 1.45pm, and usually on BBC1. The transmission runs were as follows:

- 14 February – 9 May 1977 (Mondays)
- 5 October – 28 December 1977 (Wednesdays)
- 2 April – 25 June 1978 (Sundays)
- 2 October – 25 December 1978 (Mondays)
- 3 April – 26 June 1979 (Tuesdays)
- 4 October – 27 December 1979 (Thursdays)
- 1 April – 24 June 1980 (Tuesdays)
- 28 September – 21 December 1980 (Sundays)
- 7 April – 30 June 1981 (Tuesdays)
- 9 October 1981 – 1 January 1982 (Fridays)
- 6 April – 29 June 1982 (Tuesdays)
- 3 October – 26 December 1982 (Sundays)
- 6 April – 29 June 1983 (Wednesdays)
- 9 January – 26 March 1984 (Mondays) (Note: During the first transmission run of 1984, one of the first five episodes was not shown.)
- 6 July – 28 September 1984 (Fridays)
- 30 December 1984 – 24 March 1985 (Sundays)
- 5 July – 27 September 1985 (Fridays)
- 31 March – 23 June 1986 (Mondays)
- 8 January – 2 April 1987 (Thursdays)
- 8 July – 30 September 1987 (Wednesdays) on BBC2
- 20 April – 13 July 1988 (Wednesdays) on BBC2
