= The Ups and Downs of a Handyman =

1975 British film by John Sealey

- Theatrical release poster
- Directed by: John Sealey
- Written by: Derrick Slater; John Sealey
- Produced by: Kenneth F. Rowles
- Starring: Barry Stokes; Sue Lloyd; Bob Todd
- Cinematography: Douglas Hill
- Edited by: Jim Atkinson; John W. Carr
- Music by: Vic Elms
- Production company: K.F.R. Productions
- Distributed by: Target International
- Release date: November 1975
- Running time: 100 minutes
- Country: United Kingdom
- Language: English

The Ups and Downs of a Handyman (also known as Confessions of a Handyman, Confessions of an Odd-Job Man and The Happy Housewives) is a 1975 British comedy film directed by John Sealey and starring Barry Stokes, Sue Lloyd and Bob Todd. It was written by Derrick Slater and Sealey.

== Plot ==
After his wife inherits a cottage in the countryside, Bob takes up a job as the local handyman, but soon becomes entangled with the women of the village.

== Cast ==
- Barry Stokes as Bob
- Gay Soper as Maisie
- Sue Lloyd as The Blonde
- Bob Todd as "Squire" Bullsworthy
- Valerie Leon as Redhead
- Chic Murray as P.C. Knowles
- Robert Dorning as newsagent
- Penny Meredith as Margaretta
- Helli Louise as newsagent's daughter
- John Blythe as Farmer Elgin
- Harold Bennett as Gasper
- Julia Bond as Polly
- Jeannie Collings as Mrs. Wain
- Alexandra Dane as Mrs. Knowles
- Ava Cadell as schoolgirl
- Pauline Letts as mMother
- Nita Lorraine as Jenny Elgin
- Olivia Syson as Mrs. Bullsworthy
- Jannette Carrol as barmaid

== Critical reception ==
The Monthly Film Bulletin wrote: "An unexpected gag is provided by Gay Soper in The Ups and Downs of a Handyman when she is momentarily seen singing snatches of the aria from Citizen Kane in a bathtub. Otherwise, if there are any ups to be had watching this repressive, sniggeringly unfunny soft-core farce, then they must have been brought along by the spectator. And in that case, the film has all the downs necessary to annihilate them ten times over, incidentally making it an extremely effective form of birth control."

The Radio Times wrote: "another cheap-and-cheerful sex comedy in the vein of Timothy Lea's naughty bestsellers. Barry Stokes brings a certain cheeky charm to the title role, while Gay Soper, Sue Lloyd and Valerie Leon find him plenty to do around the house. What little comedy there is comes from Benny Hill stalwart Bob Todd, as the local magistrate, and Chic Murray, as a harassed bobby. Derrick Slater's script is one long smutty gag, while John Sealey's direction is perfunctory at best."
