= Yakety Sax =

1963 instrumental composed by James Q. "Spider" Rich and Boots Randolph

Single by Boots Randolph

from the album Yakety Sax!
- B-side: "I Really Don't Want to Know"
- Released: 1963
- Studio: Phillips Recording, Nashville, Tennessee
- Genre: Novelty, pop
- Length: 2:00
- Label: Monument
- Songwriters: Spider Rich; Boots Randolph
- Producer: Fred Foster

Music video
- Boots Randolph - Yakety Sax (Audio) on YouTube

"Yakety Sax" is an instrumental novelty pop song composed by James Q. "Spider" Rich and Boots Randolph and released in 1963.

"Yakety Sax" was popularized by The Benny Hill Show. The song is widely recognized and used in television and film as a soundtrack to highlight outlandish or silly situations.

== Composition ==
Saxophonist Randolph popularized the selection in his 1963 recording, which reached number 35 on the pop charts. The piece is considered Randolph's signature work. The selection includes pieces of assorted fiddle tunes and was originally composed by Rich for a performance at a venue called The Armory in Hopkinsville, Kentucky. The piece also quotes two bars each of "Entrance of the Gladiators" and "The Girl I Left Behind".

Randolph's take on the piece was inspired by the saxophone solo played by King Curtis on The Coasters' 1958 recording of the Leiber and Stoller song "Yakety Yak". The tunes are similar, and both feature the "yakety" saxophone sound. Randolph originally recorded "Yakety Sax" that year for RCA Victor, but it did not become a hit until he re-recorded it for Monument Records in 1963; this version reached number 35 on the Billboard Hot 100 chart.

In the UK, comedian Benny Hill later made it more widely known as the closing theme music of The Benny Hill Show. "Yakety Sax" was first used, in a version arranged by Ronnie Aldrich and played by Peter Hughes, in the 19 November 1969 episode, which was also the first show for Thames Television.

== Other performances ==
- Guitarist Chet Atkins recorded a version of the song in 1965 called "Yakety Axe". Atkins' version used a similar tempo and showcased his country guitar picking style in place of a saxophone. The title change referred to the colloquial term for an electric guitar as an "axe". In 1990, Atkins collaborated with Mark Knopfler on the album Neck and Neck, where he recorded a slower-tempo version, with verses composed by Merle Travis that he recited rhythmically to the music. The original version of "Yakety Axe" was Atkins' highest charting piece on Hot Country Songs, reaching number four; it also went to number 98 on the Billboard Hot 100. Atkins and Randolph, who worked together on Elvis Presley recording sessions in the 1960s, occasionally merged their two versions of the song in joint TV appearances, with each musician trading off a verse.
- Glen Campbell recorded a guitar version of the piece in 1969 on his album Glen Campbell Live.
- Bill Haley & His Comets recorded the song on three occasions: for Orfeón of Mexico in 1964, for Guest Star Records of the US also in 1964 (which was released on a split single with "Boots' Blues", a track by Boots Randolph, on the B-side), and a live concert version for Sonet Records of Sweden in 1968. "Yakety Sax" was also a staple of Comets live performances, usually featuring saxophonist Rudy Pompilli, who was featured on the Orfeón, Guest Star and Sonet recordings.
- In 1989, The Highliners released "The Benny Hill Boogie", which is based on "Yakety Sax".
- In 2006, saxophone player Sanne Maestrom in André Rieu's orchestra played a rendition of the song as part of Rieu's New York Memories performance at Radio City Music Hall.
- Dolly Parton mimed performing "Yakety Sax" on a soprano saxophone during an appearance at the Mann Music Center in Philadelphia on June 15, 2016.

== In popular culture ==
"Yakety Sax" is often used in television and film as a soundtrack for outlandishly humorous situations. It was frequently used to accompany comedic sketches, particularly the time-lapse, rapidly-paced silent chase skit that came at the end of almost every episode of The Benny Hill Show. Because of this, "Yakety Sax" is so closely linked to the series that it is also known as "The Benny Hill Theme". From 1983 on, the music was performed by Ronnie Aldrich and his orchestra.

This use of the piece, and the chase scenes themselves, have been parodied in many other films and TV shows, including Get a Life, the 2006 film V for Vendetta, in the 2015 Doctor Who episode "The Girl Who Died" (with a character referring to the song as the "Benny Hill Theme") and the animated TV shows The Simpsons, Family Guy, South Park, multiple episodes of My Little Pony: Friendship is Magic, and "The Prime Minister Has No Clothes" episode of Time Squad. The stop motion animated sketch comedy series Robot Chicken featured a brief sketch depicting Benny Hill's funeral (using dolls) where the attendees have a Benny Hill Show-type chase scene with many of the usual gags and a song similar to "Yakety Sax". The theme was used during the 2012 Olympics beach volleyball event between sets (where rakers must rush to smooth out the court).

The song's wide recognition and use to highlight outlandish situations has led to its use for political commentary. On July 7, 2022, the tune was played outside the Houses of Parliament, upon the announcement by Boris Johnson that he was resigning as Prime Minister.
