= Gay Soper =

British actress

- Born: Gay Soper; 1945 (age 80–81); Sanderstead Surrey
- Education: London Academy of Music and Dramatic Art
- Occupations: Actress and singer
- Years active: 1965 - present
- Known for: Acting in Godspell (1971 play) Narrating The Flumps (children's television) Singing of Les Misérables (symphonic recording)
- Spouse(s): Barry Stokes (actor) 1975 - ? (divorced, 1 child)
- Website: www.gaysoper.com

Gay Soper is an English actress and singer. Her career includes singing Turn Back, O Man in the original 1971 London production of Godspell. She sang the role of Madam Thenardier on the complete symphonic recording of Les Misérables and she narrated and voiced all the characters in the children's television show The Flumps.

== Education ==
Soper was trained at the London Academy of Music and Dramatic Art between 1963 and 1965.

== Theatrical career ==
Soper was an alternate Eliza Doolittle on the original UK tour of My Fair Lady in 1965. She was later cast in the original 1971 London production of the musical Godspell, alongside Jeremy Irons, David Essex, Julie Covington and Marti Webb. The production opened at The Roundhouse, Chalk Farm and later transferred to Wyndhams Theatre.

In 1974 she appeared as one of the two girlfriends in the original London production of the musical Billy, with lyrics by Don Black and music by John Barry, based on the story of Billy Liar. Billy was played by Michael Crawford and the other girlfriend by Elaine Paige.

Her other theatre work includes the second production of Good; Mother Courage (National Theatre); and Sunday in the Park with George, Jorrocks, The Canterbury Tales, Side by Side by Sondheim, The Mitford Girls, Les Misérables, Which Witch, and Salad Days (West End). She was in the original cast of the 1970s musical Betjemania based on the poems of John Betjeman. In 2010, she appeared with Opera della Luna as Little Buttercup in Gilbert and Sullivan's H.M.S. Pinafore.

In 2011 at the Brighton Festival she played Rattigan’s mother Vera in The Art of Concealment, a new play; and toured the UK as Norah in Star Quality by Noël Coward, as Matron in Doctor In The House, as Verity Carr in Morse, in House of Ghosts, and as Helena in Maurice’s Jubilee by Nichola MacAuliffe. She was Mrs Pearce in My Fair Lady at Kilworth House Theatre, 2013; Gay later played Mrs Higgins in the musical on a tour of Denmark. At the Birmingham Rep she was the Storyteller in Stiles and Drew’s new musical version of Peter Pan, and Fraulein Schneider in Cabaret at Frankfurt; played in Cole in Hong Kong, Betjemania and Narnia in New York, and Ruth in Blithe Spirit in Stockholm, and Cherry May Waterton in Coward's Nude with Violin at the Royal Exchange Manchester for Marianne Elliott.

In 2008, Soper performed the lead role of Sister Wendy Beckett in Postcards from God - The Sister Wendy Musical at Hackney Empire Studio and reprised the role for the concept cast recording in 2010.

In 2012 she received plaudits for her performance in The Busy Body at the Southwark Playhouse in London.

Soper appeared in the original production of The Curious Incident of the Dog in the Night-Time at the Gielgud Theatre in London.

== Recorded musical career ==
Soper sung the role of Madam Thenardier on the complete symphonic recording of Les Misérables. Her solo album, Flying Fish and Fallen Angels, was released on the Dress Circle label and featured special guest Barry James.

== Film and television career ==
Soper's film roles include an appearance as "blond girl in bed" in Love Is a Splendid Illusion (1970) and a lead role as "Maisie" in The Ups and Downs of a Handyman (1975).

She appeared in the third and fourth series of Romany Jones. She also appeared alongside Sid James as Angela "hot pants" in Bless This House.

=== Selected filmography ===
- Love Is a Splendid Illusion (1970)
- The Ups and Downs of a Handyman (1975)
- The Flumps (1976)

== Personal life ==
Soper is married to actor Barry Stokes. They had a son, Matthew Stokes (1976–2009), who was also an actor.

== Bibliography ==
- Simon Sheridan (2011) Keeping the British End Up: Four Decades of Saucy Cinema (Titan Books; 4th edition)
- Simon, Sheridan (2007) [2004]. The A to Z of Classic Children's Television (Reprint ed.). Reynolds & Hearn Books. ISBN 978-1-903111-27-7.
