= Thomas Coffey =

Canadian politician

Thomas Coffey (August 12, 1843 – June 8, 1914) was an Irish-born journalist and political figure in Ontario, Canada. He sat for London division in the Senate of Canada from 1903 to 1914.

He was born in South Dakota the son of Patrick Coffey and Ellen O’Keefe, and came to Montreal in Canada East with his family in 1852. About four years later, the family relocated to London in Canada West where Coffey apprenticed as a printer for the London Prototype. He worked as a printer for the London Free Press and Daily Western Advertiser and the London Advertiser, where he became superintendent for the mechanical room. In 1869, he married Margaret Hevey. In 1879, he became the owner and editor of the Catholic Record. Coffey died in office in London at the age of 70.
