= The Golden Shot =

British TV game show (1967–1975)

- Opening titles (1974)
- Genre: Game show
- Presented by: Jackie Rae; Bob Monkhouse; Norman Vaughan; Charlie Williams
- Country of origin: United Kingdom
- Original language: English
- No. of episodes: 337

Production
- Production locations: ATV Elstree (1967); Alpha Studios (1968–69); ATV Centre (1969–75)
- Running time: 60 minutes (inc. adverts)
- Production company: ATV

Original release
- Network: ITV
- Release: 1 July 1967 – 13 April 1975

The Golden Shot is a British television game show produced by ATV for ITV between 1 July 1967 and 13 April 1975, based on the German TV show Der goldene Schuß. It is most commonly associated with host Bob Monkhouse, but three other presenters also fronted the show. Hostess Anne Aston was on hand to read out the scores achieved by the contestants, and each month a "Maid of the Month", usually a glamour model of the era, would demonstrate the prizes and announce the contestants. When Bob Monkhouse returned to present the show in 1974, he was joined by co-hostess (to Anne Aston) Wei Wei Wong, who had recently been seen in The Man with the Golden Gun and who was an ex-member of the Young Generation and Second Generation dance troupes. This was one of the earliest regular appearances by an East Asian woman on British TV.

The show was broadcast live and used a crossbow attached to a TV camera to shoot a bolt at a target, using the camera as the crossbow's viewfinder. The person who loaded the crossbows was referred to by the nickname "Bernie" (or "Heinz" in early episodes), giving rise to the catchphrase "Bernie, the bolt".

== Gameplay ==
The show involved the "Tele-Bow", a crossbow attached to a television camera guided by a contestant. It shot a bolt at an exploding target embedded in an apple positioned on a topical backdrop (usually an enlargement of Bob's own cartoons). In the first round, the crossbow was operated by blindfolded cameraman Derek Chason receiving instructions from a contestant, playing either at home by phone or in the studio from an isolation booth. First-round winners from previous shows would be invited to the studio to compete in pairs using crossbows fitted with butts, sights, and triggers mounted on stands. In later rounds, the contestants operated the crossbow themselves, first by remote control using a joystick, and finally handling the Tele-Bow directly for the ultimate prize. The last and most difficult task was to fire the crossbow bolt to cut a fine thread holding a small door closed. Breaking the thread opened the door, producing a shower of gold coins.

Contestants who successfully negotiated seven (later four) rounds of targets won a reasonable prize; those who missed got a negligible one. Most who reached the final stage operated the Tele-Bow like a rifle, with mixed results. One winner simply stood next to it and used a light touch on the rifle butt, sighting using the TV screen.

In his autobiography, host Bob Monkhouse recounted the story of a person who competed on the show from a telephone kiosk while watching a television in a rental shop over the road. While the contestant was directing the bolt, however, an assistant came in and switched the televisions off or changed the channel.

Another story Monkhouse told was about a priest (who was in the studio audience) audibly praying during the programme that he wouldn't get injured by the bolt, only for the bolt to ricochet off the target and land beside the priest.

== Broadcast history ==
The show's first host was Canadian singer and record producer Jackie Rae. Bob Monkhouse was a guest star on the tenth episode, and his autobiography reveals he did so fully intending to demonstrate to the producers that he should replace Rae as host. The plan worked, and Monkhouse took over as host from the 15th show onward. His quick wit, and willingness to revel in the show's chaotic nature led the Monkhouse era to be regarded as the show's golden age; by programme 26, the viewing figures were up by 50%. Because the programme was broadcast live (necessary because contestants took part over the telephone), Monkhouse often chatted to the participants to fill in whilst the crossbow was adjusted after the previous round.

In January 1968, the show moved to Sunday afternoons at around 16:40. Michael Grade has claimed that this resulted from a remark he made to his uncle, Lew Grade, ATV's deputy chairman and joint managing director, that the cinemas were full on Sunday afternoons because there was nothing to watch on television. However, the Midlands and North weekend franchisee ABC Television had been showing the programme in this slot since late September 1967, so Grade must share the credit with ABC's programme controller Brian Tesler. Audience levels peaked at 16 million. From January 1969, the production moved from ATV Elstree near London, to the Alpha Studios at Aston in Birmingham. The studio facilities in Birmingham, situated in a converted cinema, were rather run-down and unreliable (they dated from the start of ATV's franchise in 1956) and simply not well-suited to a fast-moving live show like The Golden Shot; as such, technical failures were common, but Monkhouse was well able to cover for them through his quick-witted humour. From 1970, the show moved to the new ATV Centre in Birmingham. During the ITV Colour Strike of 1970-71, episodes 10 to 21 of series 3 were broadcast in black-and-white.

In 1972, Monkhouse was spotted accepting a gift from Wilkinson Sword representative Bob Brooksby. The following week, a Wilkinson Sword "his and hers" grooming kit was the bronze prize on the show. ATV's production controller Francis Essex suspected collusion and fired Monkhouse, although publicly it was announced that he "was being released to find opportunities for his abilities elsewhere". The gift was in fact the collectable book The Shy Photographer and there was no collusion; however Monkhouse's side of the story was not made public until his autobiography Crying with Laughter was published in 1993.

The next host was comedian and entertainer Norman Vaughan, who was assisted by regular hostess Anne Aston and for several months "Maid of the Month" Cherri Gilham. In theory, Norman Vaughan was an ideal host for the show but the pressure of the live show seemed to overwhelm him and he was never as confident a host as Monkhouse. Audience figures began to drop and in late 1973, he was replaced by comedian (and former footballer) Charlie Williams along with hostess Wendy King. Williams, of Barbadian ancestry on his father's side and Yorkshire on his mother's side, was rather a novelty on British TV at the time, being a black man with a broad Yorkshire accent. Despite his cheerfulness and amiability he proved unsuited to handling the pressure of a live TV show where things frequently went wrong. After six months, Williams was also replaced.

On 20 March 1974, Francis Essex met with Bob Monkhouse to invite him back onto the show. Monkhouse had no hesitation in accepting the offer, though his agent negotiated that he would only return if ATV took up an option on the American game show The Hollywood Squares. This was agreed, and Monkhouse returned as host of the new season of The Golden Shot on 14 July 1974. It was complete with a new theme song, "Golden Day", written by Lynsey de Paul and Barry Blue and sung by Stephanie de Sykes and Rain. Very soon it was obvious that the show was back at its peak however, the last edition of the show was transmitted on 13 April 1975, with Monkhouse, Vaughan and Williams all hosting it together. ATV felt that the show had a long successful run, and it was retiring various old shows to make way for new ones, including Monkhouse's version of Hollywood Squares, Celebrity Squares, which debuted on 20 July 1975.

=== Bernie, the bolt! ===
The show's catchphrase became "Bernie, the bolt!" (originally "Heinz, the bolt!", as Heinz had been brought over from Germany when the show was imported). The instruction was from the host to the armourer that the crossbow bolt should be loaded. Three people acted as "Bernie" on the show; Alan Bailey, Derek Young, and Johnny Baker (a film unit grip). There was an element of mystery associated with the crossbow loaders, as they were not introduced by name and said nothing.

=== Revivals ===
The programme was revived in two forms.

In 1991, the idea was used for the final round, "The Dart Through the Heart", of the Bob Monkhouse gameshow for newly married couples, Bob's Your Uncle. The winning couple would compete for a jackpot where one partner was blindfolded and the other guided them in trying to shoot a dart into a heart-shaped target. The armourer for this was female, and introduced by the request, "Donna, the dart".

On 1 October 2005, as part of their Gameshow Marathon celebrating 50 years of the ITV network, Ant & Dec hosted a one-off revival that was the only edition of the series to be broadcast live. The show was revived again as a one-off on Vernon Kay's Gameshow Marathon on 28 April 2007.

== Parodies ==
The show was parodied as "The Golden Shoot" in an episode of The Benny Hill Show broadcast 25 December 1969.

== See also ==
- TV Powww (similar US program, involving video games)
