= Irving Rosenwater =

English cricket researcher and author

Irving Rosenwater

Irving Rosenwater (11 September 1932 – 30 January 2006) was an English cricket researcher and author whose best-known work was Sir Donald Bradman - A Biography (1978).

Born in the East End of London to Jewish parents of Polish origin, Rosenwater initially had two birth certificates. The first registered him as "Isidore", but his parents had second thoughts and promptly changed it.

Rosenwater worked on several cricket publications including The Cricketer, where his first reports appeared in 1955; Wisden Cricketer's Almanack; The Cricket Society Journal, of which he was the co-founder; and Cricket Quarterly (1963–1970), on which he worked with its founder Rowland Bowen. In 1970, Rosenwater became the official cricket scorer for BBC TV, succeeding Roy Webber, but left in 1977 to join Kerry Packer's revolutionary World Series Cricket.

Rosenwater was statistician for Channel Nine until the late 1980s. It is not exactly known when he left Nine. Wendy Wimbush took over from him and later Max Kruger who occupied the position until 2016.
