= Rendezvous in Paris (1982 film) =

1982 film by Gabi Kubach

- Theatrical release poster
- Directed by: Gabi Kubach
- Screenplay by: Gabi Kubach
- Based on: Das große Einmaleins by Vicki Baum
- Produced by: Susi Dölfes; Jan Kadlec; Mathias Wittich
- Starring: Claude Jade; Barry Stokes; Harald Kuhlmann; Vérénice Rudolph
- Cinematography: Helge Weindler
- Edited by: Rolf Basedow
- Music by: Paul Vincent
- Production companies: France 3; Bavaria-Filmkunst
- Distributed by: Bavaria-Filmkunst Verleih
- Release dates: 11 December 1982 (France); 23 December 1983 (West Germany)
- Running time: 104 minutes
- Countries: France; West Germany
- Language: German

Rendezvous in Paris is a 1982 psychological thriller film written and directed by Gabi Kubach, based on the 1935 novel Das große Einmaleins (Men Never Know) by Vicki Baum. The film stars Claude Jade, Harald Kuhlmann, Barry Stokes and Vérénice Rudolph.

== Plot ==
In Berlin in 1930, sensitive Evelyne Droste leads a sheltered life married to respectable lawyer Kurt. The children are cared for by a governess and a nanny, and she feels somehow superfluous and unfulfilled on a personal level. But when she meets the American Frank Davies at a party, her passion and vitality return. Evelyn finally agrees to Frank's invitation for a weekend in Paris. But while Evelyn puts her middle-class life on the line, for Frank it is perhaps only an adventure.

== Cast ==
- Claude Jade as Evelyne Droste
- Harald Kuhlmann as Kurt Droste
- Barry Stokes as Frank Davis
- Vérénice Rudolph as Marianne
- Nina Divíšková as Gouvernante at Droste
- Marie Horáková as Veronika
- Gunther Malzacher as Von Gebhardt
- Chantal Bronner as Mlle Michel
- Frantisek Peterka as Herr Rupp
- Barbara Morawiecz as Frau Rupp
