= Lesley Goldie =

British actress

- Occupation: Actress

Lesley Goldie is a British actress of the early to mid-1970s, especially and better known for her appearances on The Benny Hill Show as guest star.

Her works also include appearances with Mike & Bernie Winters, Frankie Howerd, Des O'Connor and Jimmy Tarbuck; such television programs as Bless This House, Bachelor Father, Father, Dear Father and Tales of the Unexpected (on the last of which she had a small role in a 1981 episode, her last known acting role to date); the 1973 film version of Love Thy Neighbour; and appearances on the London stage including Suddenly at Home (as Maggie Howard, in 1972-73) and The Gay Lord Quex (in 1975, directed by John Gielgud and also co-starring Dame Judi Dench and Siân Phillips).
