= Goldfish Club =

Worldwide association of people who have escaped an aircraft and ended up in water

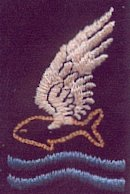
This is the embroidered badge for the Goldfish Club, which commemorates the evacuation of a disabled craft over or on water, and the use of life preservers such as inflatable life jackets and crafts.

The Goldfish Club is a worldwide association of people who have escaped an aircraft by parachuting into the water, or whose aircraft crashed in the water, and whose lives were saved by a life jacket, inflatable dinghy, or similar device. The Goldfish Club badge shows a white-winged goldfish flying over two symbolic blue waves. The main aim of the club is 'to keep alive the spirit of comradeship arising from the mutual experience of members surviving, "coming down in the drink".'

== World War II ==
The Goldfish Club was formed in November 1942 by C. A. Robertson, the Chief Draftsman at the United Kingdom's PB Cow & Co., one of the world’s largest manufacturers of air-sea rescue equipment. After hearing of the experiences of airmen who had survived a ditching at sea, Robertson decided to form an exclusive club for airmen who owed their lives to their life jacket, dinghy, etc., enabling members to meet and exchange experiences.

With the company’s backing, the club was named The Goldfish Club: gold for the value of life, and fish for the water. Each member was presented with a heat-sealed waterproof membership card and an embroidered badge. News of the club spread rapidly, and in January 1943 the BBC broadcast an interview by Wynford Vaughan-Thomas with Robertson and two members who had qualified on their first operational flight. The Pilot and navigator were P/o Len Harvey DSO and F/L B Wicksteed who lost a Beaufighter BQ/O on 7 June 1942 after combat with a JU 88 originally reported as a Heinkel 111. Harvey was awarded a DSO and Wicksteed a DFC on 31/6/1942, two German Officers from the JU 88 were recovered from the sea off Lands End on 15/06/1942.

Due to wartime regulations, production of metallic-embroidered badges was prohibited, and all cloth was severely rationed. These problems were overcome with silk embroidery substituted for wire upon black cloth cut from old evening dress suits that were sent by readers of the London Daily Express after an appeal by columnist William Hickey. Uniform dress regulations prohibited the wearing of the Goldfish Club badge on British and American uniforms. The badge was generally worn by Naval aircrews upon their Mae Wests. Many RAF & USAAF aircrewmen placed their badge under the flap of their left hand uniform pocket.

== After the war ==
By the end of World War II, the club had 9,000 members from all branches of the Allied forces. The club attempted to end the granting of memberships, but applications continued to arrive. When Robertson left PB Cow in 1947, he retained the club records and continued operating it at his own expense.

An article in the RAFA journal Airmail in January, 1951, renewed interest in the club, and a reunion dinner was held. It was a great success, and the club was reorganized on a formal basis in March, 1953. Reunions have been held annually ever since at various venues with many distinguished guests. In response to a message of greetings sent to her, Mae West made it clear that she took great pride in the fact that members of the RAF had adopted her name for their life-jackets.

Members of the club have included airmen who qualified in World War I, more than twenty years before the club was begun. Many of the older members have passed on, but new members still arrive. Many of those who joined during the war rejoin on learning of the club’s continued existence. One member nominated as a special member the Italian airman who offered him a seat in his dinghy when they met in the Mediterranean in 1942. The only German member qualified when he ejected from his F-104G, part of the NATO forces, in 1971. Helicopter crews predominate recently, since ditchings are rare among modern combat aircraft. Richard Branson escaped from his trans-Atlantic balloon but declined becoming the first lighter-than-air Goldfish.

Today, with over five hundred members around the world, the annual subscription is £5, and they keep in touch with a regular newsletter and annual get togethers.

== Literature ==
The book cover of The Goldfish Club, written by Danny Danziger

Due to the unique and rather exclusive nature of the club, it became highly publicized, being featured in Aeroplane magazine on 26 March 1943, the Burra Record in 1945 and the RAFA magazine Airmail in 1951, to name just a few.

Money, position or power cannot gain a man or woman entry to the exclusive circles of the Goldfish Club To become a member one has to float about upon the sea for a considerable period with nothing but a Carley Rubber Float between one and a watery death.

— The Burra Record 1945

The stories of many of the members of the Goldfish Club are brought together and told through the book The Goldfish Club by Danny Danziger, which was published in April 2012. Danziger is a member of the Goldfish Club, and so he collects together many of the current and past members diverse stories into this book.

== See also ==
- Caterpillar Club
- Ejection Tie Club

== Sources ==
- Barker, Ralph. Down in the Drink: True Stories of the Goldfish Club, London: Chatto & Windus, 1955.
- Goldfish Club web page
- 303rd Bomb Group web page
