= Jackie Wright =

Northern Irish comedian (1904–1989)

- Born: John Wright; 24 September 1904; Belfast, Ireland
- Died: 11 January 1989 (aged 84); Belfast, Northern Ireland
- Occupation: Comedian
- Height: 4 ft 11 in (1.50 m)

John Wright (24 September 1904 – 11 January 1989), credited professionally as Jackie Wright, also nicknamed Little Jackie and Uncle Jackie, was a Northern Irish comedian.

He is best known for being the bald-headed sidekick of Benny Hill on his television programme for fifteen years. Wright's diminutive stature – he was 4 feet 11 inches (1.50 m) tall – and Northern Irish accent became assets to the comedy.

== Biography ==
Born in Belfast, the eighth of twelve children born to George and Agnes (née Finlay) Wright, Jackie first worked as a car body assembler, even working in the United States for Cadillac. In the early 1930s, when the Great Depression took hold, Wright returned to Belfast and then began working in the field of entertainment, first as a musician and then as a supporting comedian.

He did not enter television until the 1960s, when Hill discovered him and persuaded him to join his troupe. At the time, Hill was ending his stint with the BBC, and starting a 20-year relationship with Thames Television. Hill usually referred to him as "Little Jackie" or "our little Donny Osmond" on the programme. In many of the show's trademark accelerated-motion scenes, Hill would often pat Wright's bald head rapidly, the motion being accompanied by dubbed-in smacking sounds. Actress Suzy Mandel claimed that "Jackie Wright was a chain smoker and he would often hide his cigarette in his mouth or behind his back during scenes. In fact, you could often see a little plume of smoke rising behind him if you looked close enough. Benny would slap his head to fan the smoke away."

Wright also appeared on the short-lived 1973 programme Whoops Baghdad starring Frankie Howerd, and had a small role in the musical comedy film Three for All in 1975. He gained a cult following when edited versions of The Benny Hill Show were first broadcast in syndication in the United States during the late 1970s.

== Death ==
Wright left the show in 1983 owing to poor health, although previously unaired footage of him in sketches filmed in previous years was incorporated into new Benny Hill shows up to 1985. Five and a half years later, he died at the age of 84 in a Belfast hospital after battling a long, undisclosed illness. At the time of his death, Benny Hill remarked, "He was a lovely little fella... I'm saddened beyond words." He was replaced on the Benny Hill show by Johnny Hutch.
