= Dennis Kirkland =

English television producer and director (1942–2006)

- Born: 2 December 1942; North Shields, Northumberland, England
- Died: 16 February 2006 (aged 63); London, England
- Occupation: Television producer

Dennis Kirkland (2 December 1942 – 16 February 2006) was an English television producer and director best known for his long association with comedian Benny Hill.

== Early life and career ==
Born in North Shields, Northumberland, England, Kirkland started out as a child actor, appearing in television advertisements that aired on the then-new Independent Television upon its start-up in the 1950s. He then went behind-the-scenes, first as a property master for Tyne Tees Television, and then on to short stints with the Windmill Theatre and Royal Opera House in London. Later he was hired by Associated TeleVision as a floor manager, where he worked at the time Benny Hill hosted some TV programmes for ATV in 1967.

== Career ==
In 1968, Kirkland joined Thames Television as a floor manager, before becoming a warm-up man on The Benny Hill Show. He then moved up the ranks, directing children's shows such as Rainbow and The Tomorrow People, as well as a sketch comedy show called What's on Next?, and a panel show, Whodunnit?, fronted by Jon Pertwee.

In 1979 Kirkland became producer/director of The Benny Hill Show, remaining in those positions for the remainder of its run at Thames. The show, with its increased emphasis on slapstick, sight gags, and with attractive female assistants, increased Hill's popularity, and it was sold around the world, making Hill an international star in the United States, Europe, Japan and elsewhere. It was with Hill's shows, which he directed for a decade, that Kirkland became best known, but at the same time the programme became dogged by charges of sexism, in no small part due to the addition of the dancing and singing troupe Hill's Angels. During this period, he also worked with top comics including Tommy Cooper, Ken Dodd, Jim Davidson and Eric Sykes, whose 1979 remake of The Plank (directed by Sykes and produced by Kirkland) won at the Montreux TV Festival.

After years of steadily declining ratings and rising production costs, Thames cancelled the Benny Hill show in 1989; not long afterward, Kirkland's association with the company ended as well. Kirkland was outspoken about what he saw as the hypocrisy of the company cancelling the show while continuing to benefit financially from its sales abroad. He continued to work with Hill, and directed a TV special in 1990 with outdoor scenes taped in New York. He was to direct a new Hill series for Central Independent Television; when Hill died in 1992, Central went ahead with the show anyway, directed by Kirkland and fronted by Freddie Starr. Critics panned it calling it "The Benny Hill Show without Benny." In 1993, he published a memoir about his friendship with Hill, Benny: The True Story, re-released in 2002 as The Strange and Saucy World of Benny Hill. Kirkland continued to work in television in Britain and Ireland until his death.

== Personal life ==
Kirkland was married twice and had two sons and a daughter, the actress Joanna Kirkland.

== Death ==
Kirkland was admitted to hospital in London in January 2006 because of a low sodium count and died shortly thereafter at the age of 63.
