= Benny Hill =

English comedy actor (1924–1992)

- Born: Alfred Hawthorne Hill; 21 January 1924; Southampton, England
- Died: 18 April 1992 (aged 68); Teddington, England
- Resting place: Hollybrook Cemetery, Southampton, England

Comedy career
- Years active: 1947–1992
- Medium: Film; recording; television
- Genres: Burlesque; double entendre; slapstick

Alfred Hawthorne "Benny" Hill (21 January 1924 – 18 April 1992) was an English comedian, actor, writer and musician. He is best remembered for his television programme The Benny Hill Show, a comedy variety show merging slapstick, burlesque, double entendre and innuendo in live and filmed segments with Hill in almost every one.

The BFI called Hill "the first British comedian to attain fame through television" and "a major star for over forty years". Making his television debut in 1949, he appeared on BBC variety shows where he developed his parodic sketches and, in 1954, was voted television personality of the year. The Benny Hill Show, which debuted in 1955, was among the most-watched programmes in the UK; his audience was more than 21 million in 1971. The show was also exported to over 100 countries, a global appeal which the BFI attributed to "Hill's emphasis on visual humour transcending language barriers".

Hill received a BAFTA Television Award for Best Writer and a Rose d'Or, and he was nominated for the BAFTA for Best Entertainment Performance and for two Emmy Awards for Outstanding Variety. In 1990 Anthony Burgess described Hill as "a comic genius steeped in the British music hall tradition". In 2006, Hill was voted by the British public number 17 in ITV's poll of TV's 50 Greatest Stars.

Outside television, Hill starred in films including the Ealing comedy Who Done It? (1956), Those Magnificent Men in Their Flying Machines (1965), Chitty Chitty Bang Bang (1968) and The Italian Job (1969). His comedy song, "Ernie (The Fastest Milkman in the West)", was 1971's Christmas number one on the UK singles chart and earned Hill an Ivor Novello Award from the British Academy of Songwriters, Composers and Authors in 1972.

== Early life ==
Alfred Hawthorne Hill was born 21 January 1924 (although some sources give his birth year as 1925) in Southampton, Hampshire. His father, Alfred Hill (1893–1972), manager of a surgical appliance shop, and grandfather, Henry Hill (born 1871), had been circus clowns. His mother was Helen (née Cave; 1894–1976).

After leaving Taunton's School in Southampton, Hill worked at the Eastleigh branch of Woolworths and as a milkman, a bridge operator, a driver and a drummer before becoming assistant stage manager with a touring revue. He was called up in 1942 and trained as a mechanic in the Royal Electrical and Mechanical Engineers, British Army. He served as a mechanic, truck driver and searchlight operator in Normandy after September 1944, and transferred to the Combined Services Entertainment division before the end of the war.

Inspired by the "star comedians" of British music hall shows, Hill set out to make his mark in show business. He took the nickname of "Benny" in homage to his favourite comedian, Jack Benny.

== Career ==
After the Second World War, Hill worked as a performer on radio, making his debut on Variety Bandbox on 5 October 1947. His first job in theatre was as Reg Varney's straight man, with Hill beating a then unknown Peter Sellers to the role. His first appearance on television was in 1949. He later starred in a sitcom anthology, Benny Hill, which ran from 1962 to 1963, in which he played a different character in each episode. In 1964, he played Nick Bottom in an all-star TV film production of William Shakespeare's A Midsummer Night's Dream. He also had a radio programme lasting three series called Benny Hill Time on BBC Radio's Light Programme from 1964 to 1966. It was a topical show; for example, a March 1964 episode featured James Bond, 007, in "From Moscow with Love", and his version of the Beatles. He played a number of characters in the series, such as Harry Hill and Fred Scuttle.

=== Films ===
- Who Done It? (1956) – Hugo Dill
- Light Up the Sky! (1960) – Syd McGaffey
- Those Magnificent Men in Their Flying Machines (1965) – Fire Chief Perkins
- Chitty Chitty Bang Bang (1968) – Toymaker
- The Italian Job (1969) – Professor Simon Peach
- The Waiters (1969, short, writer) – 1st waiter
- Eddie in August (1970, TV, short, co-director, writer) – Eddie
- The Best of Benny Hill (1974) compilation of The Benny Hill Show episodes (1969–1973)

=== Recordings ===
Hill's audio recordings include "Gather in the Mushrooms" (1961), "Pepys' Diary" (1961), "Transistor Radio" (1961), "Harvest of Love" (1963) and "Ernie (The Fastest Milkman in the West)", which was the UK Christmas number one single in 1971. He received an Ivor Novello Award from the British Academy of Songwriters, Composers and Authors in 1972.

=== The Benny Hill Show ===
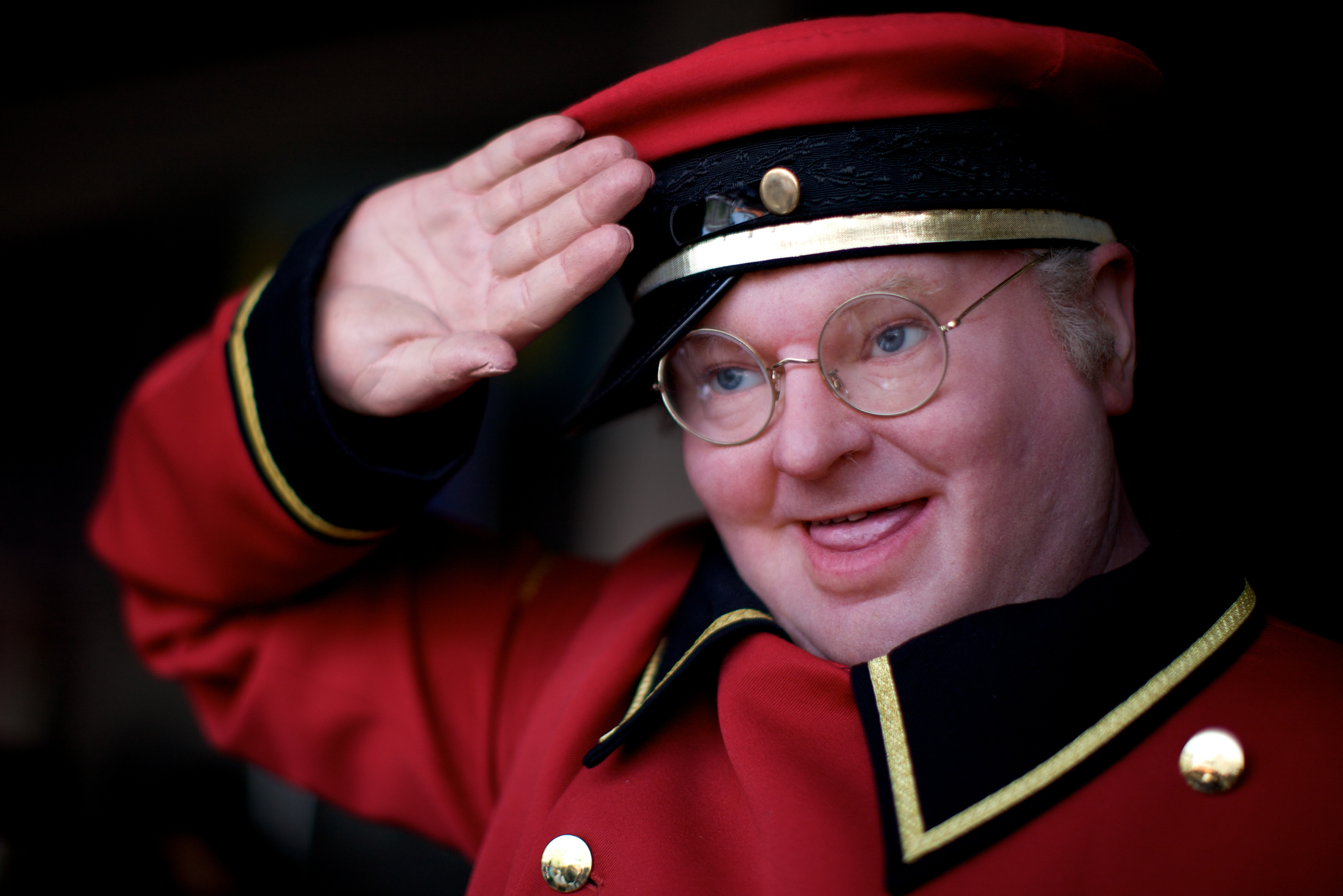
Waxwork of Hill in character as Fred Scuttle on The Benny Hill Show

Hill had struggled on stage and had uneven success in radio, but in television he found a medium that played to his strengths. In the early 1950s, he appeared as a guest on various BBC variety shows where he developed his parodic sketches. In 1954, he was voted television personality of the year. The Benny Hill Show, which debuted the following year, aired on the BBC and ITV (from 1969) between 15 January 1955 and 1 May 1989. It had a music hall-derived format, combining live on-stage comedy and filmed sketches, which included his comic characters such as Fred Scuttle, and its humour relied on slapstick, innuendo and parody. Recurring players on his show during the BBC years included Patricia Hayes, Jeremy Hawk, Peter Vernon, Ronnie Brody and his cowriter from the early 1950s to early 1960s, Dave Freeman. Short, bald Jackie Wright was a frequent supporting player who in many sketches had to put up with Hill slapping him on the top of his head.

Hill remained mostly with the BBC until 1968, except for a few sojourns with ITV and ATV stations between 1957 and 1960 and again in 1967. In 1969 his show moved from the BBC to Thames Television, where it remained until its cancellation in 1989, with an erratic schedule of one-hour specials. The series showcased Hill's talents as an imaginative writer, comic performer and impressionist. He may have bought scripts from various comedy writers but if so they never received an onscreen credit. (Some evidence indicates he bought a script from one of his regular cast members in 1976, Cherri Gilham, to whom he wrote from Spain, telling her he was using her "Fat Lady" idea on the show in January 1977.)

To this day, The Benny Hill Show, as watched by 21.1 million people in 1977, and which over the years won its star a BAFTA, the Golden Rose of Montreux, and a Variety Club of Great Britain ITV Personality of the Year award, remains the sole programme that spoke directly to the dream experience of the hot-blooded adolescent. This was perhaps why Thames could sell the show to so many foreign markets, from France, Spain and West Germany to the remotest jungle clearing in Brazil—deep up the Amazon River, photos of Hill were to be found in mud huts.

— Roger Lewis in GQ magazine on the popularity of the show in Britain and abroad, April 2014

The most common running gag in Hill's shows was the closing sequence, the "run-off", which was literally a running gag featuring various members of the cast chasing Hill, along with other stock comedy characters, such as policemen, vicars and old women. This was commonly filmed using "under-cranking" camera techniques and included other comic features, such as jogging instead of a run at full speed and characters running off one side of the screen and reappearing running on from the other. The tune used in all the chases, Boots Randolph's "Yakety Sax", is so strongly associated with the show that it is commonly referred to as "The Benny Hill Theme". It has been used as a form of parody in many ways by television shows and films. In a 2015 UK-wide poll, the show's theme song was voted number 1 on the ITV special The Sound of ITV – The Nation's Favourite Theme Tune.

From the start of the 1980s, the show featured a troupe of attractive young women, known collectively as "Hill's Angels". They would appear either on their own in a dance sequence or in character as foils against Hill. Sue Upton was one of the longest-serving members of the Angels. Jane Leeves appeared as well. Henry McGee and Bob Todd joined Jackie Wright as comic supporting players and later shows also featured "Hill's Little Angels", a group of children, including the families of Dennis Kirkland (the show's director) and Sue Upton. Jenny Lee-Wright (who first appeared on Hill's show in 1970) earned the nickname "The Sexiest Stooge", coined by Hill.

The alternative comedian Ben Elton made a headline-grabbing allegation, both on the TV show Saturday Live and in the January 1987 edition of Q magazine, that The Benny Hill Show incited crimes and misdemeanours. "We know in Britain, women can't even walk safe in a park anymore. That, for me, is worrying." A writer in The Independent newspaper, though, opined that Elton's charge was "like watching an elderly uncle being kicked to death by young thugs". GQ magazine stated, "Pompous and portentous as this is, blaming Hill for rape statistics is like pointing a finger at concert pianists for causing elephant poaching." Elton later parodied himself in Harry Enfield & Chums as Benny Elton, a politically correct spoilsport; Elton ends up being chased by angry women, accompanied by the "Yakety Sax" theme, after trying to force them to be more feminist. A spokesman for the Broadcasting Standards Council commented that "the convention is becoming increasingly offensive [...] It's not as funny as it was to have half-naked girls chased across the screen by a dirty old man."

In late May 1989, Hill announced that after 21 years with Thames Television, he was quitting and taking a year off. His shows had earned Thames £26 million, with a large percentage due to the success of his shows in the United States. John Howard Davies, the head of Light Entertainment at Thames Television, was cited by the British press as the man who sacked Hill when the company decided not to renew his contract. "The show was past its sell-by date", Davies told The Guardian. "The audiences were going down, the programme was costing a vast amount of money, and he (Hill) was looking a little tired."

In 1991, Hill started work on a new television series called Benny Hill's World Tour, which would see Hill performing his sketches around the world in places his show had become popular. However, Hill managed to record only one special, called Greetings from New York (with regular cast members such as Henry McGee, Bob Todd and Sue Upton), with the show becoming billed as "his final TV appearance" when released on DVD.

In February 1992, Thames Television, which received a steady stream of requests from viewers for The Benny Hill Show repeats, finally gave in and put together a number of re-edited shows. Hill died on the same day a new contract arrived in the post from Central Independent Television, for which he was to have made a series of specials. He had turned down competing offers from Carlton and Thames.

== Celebrity fans ==
My father was mad about Benny Hill, Monty Python and The Avengers, Bond movies and the Peter Sellers films, so that's what I grew up watching. Those clearly had a big influence on me.

— Mike Myers lists some of the British pop cultural influences on his own career, June 2007

Johnny Carson and sidekick Ed McMahon were both fans of Hill and tried several times to get him to travel to Los Angeles to be a guest on Carson's The Tonight Show.

Radio and TV host Adam Carolla said that he was a fan of Hill whom he considered "as American as the Beatles". During an episode of The Man Show in 2000, Carolla performed in what was billed as a tribute to "our favourite Englishman, Sir Benny Hill" (sic; Hill was never knighted), in more risqué versions of some of the sketches. Carolla played a rude and lecherous waiter, a typical Hill role, and the sketch featured many of the staples of Hill's shows, including a Jackie Wright-esque bald man, as well as scantily clad women.

During a British tour in the 1970s, Michael Jackson said in an interview that he was a fan of Hill. Jackson would meet Hill in 1992. In 1987, Genesis filmed a video for their song "Anything She Does", featuring Hill as his character Fred Scuttle, portraying an incompetent security guard who lets a ridiculous number of fans backstage at a Genesis concert. In a June 2011 interview with The Observer, the rapper Snoop Dogg declared himself to be a fan of Hill. Busta Rhymes paid tribute to Hill while on the red carpet at the 2024 MTV EMAs in Manchester, England.

In the Omnibus episode, "Benny Hill – Clown Imperial", filmed shortly before his death, several celebrities, including Burt Reynolds, Michael Caine, John Mortimer, Mickey Rooney and Walter Cronkite, among others, expressed their appreciation of and admiration for Hill and his humour. In Reynolds' case, the appreciation extended to the Hill's Angels as well. The novelist Anthony Burgess was also an admirer of Hill. Burgess, whose novels were often comic, relished language, wordplay and dialect, and he admired the verbal and comedic skill that underlay Hill's success. Reviewing a biography of Hill, Saucy Boy, in The Guardian in 1990, Burgess described Hill as "a comic genius steeped in the British music hall tradition" (as were Charlie Chaplin and Stan Laurel, two of Hill's childhood idols) and "one of the great artists of our age". A meeting between the two men was described in a newspaper article by Burgess and recalled in the Telegraph newspaper by the satirist Craig Brown.

== Personal life ==
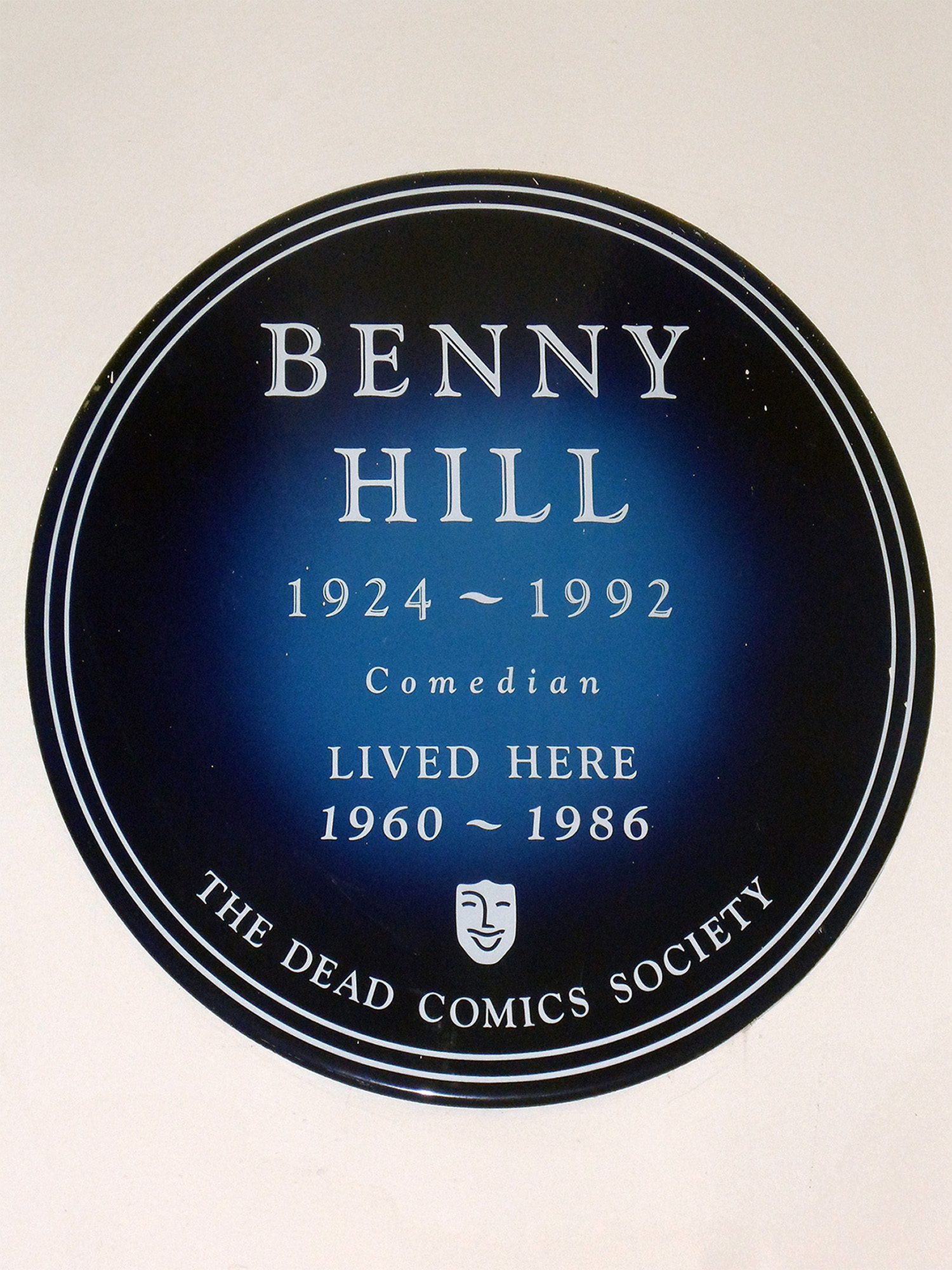
Blue plaque commemorating Hill, at his former residence on Queen's Gate in Kensington, London

Before I quit that job (at the Woolworth's store in Southampton) it had two big effects on me....I fell in love and I learned about people...The girl I fell in love with was Jean, two years my senior. The romance did not last, because her attitude towards me was one of amused tolerance. 'You make me laugh, sonny boy,' she used to say... [On Benny's observance of people:] That comes naturally when you work in a chain store, because you meet thousands of people. Unconsciously, at first, I began to notice foibles and mannerisms. I began to develop a mirror-like memory for faces and voices.

—Benny Hill

Hill was noted for his frugality. He never owned his own house in London and preferred to rent a flat rather than buy one. He rented a double-room apartment at 2 Queen's Gate in Kensington, London, for 26 years until around 1986, when he moved to Fairwater House in Teddington, near Teddington Studios. While looking for somewhere to live, he briefly stayed at 22 Westrow Gardens in Southampton, the town of his birth.

Despite being a multi-millionaire he continued with the frugal habits he had picked up from his parents, such as buying food at supermarkets, walking for miles rather than paying for a taxi unless someone else paid for a limousine and regularly patching and mending his clothes. He never owned a car either despite having a driving licence.

Hill never married and had no children. He had proposed to three women but none accepted. Shortly after his death in 1992, actress Annette Andre said that she turned down his marriage proposal in the early 1960s. Rumours circulated that he was gay but he always denied them.

Hill was a Francophile and enjoyed visits to France, particularly Marseille, where, until the 1980s, he could go to outdoor cafes anonymously, travelling on public transport and socialising with local women. He spoke French fluently and also knew basic German, Spanish, Dutch and Italian. Travel was the only luxury he permitted himself; even then he would stay in modest accommodation.

== Health problems and death ==
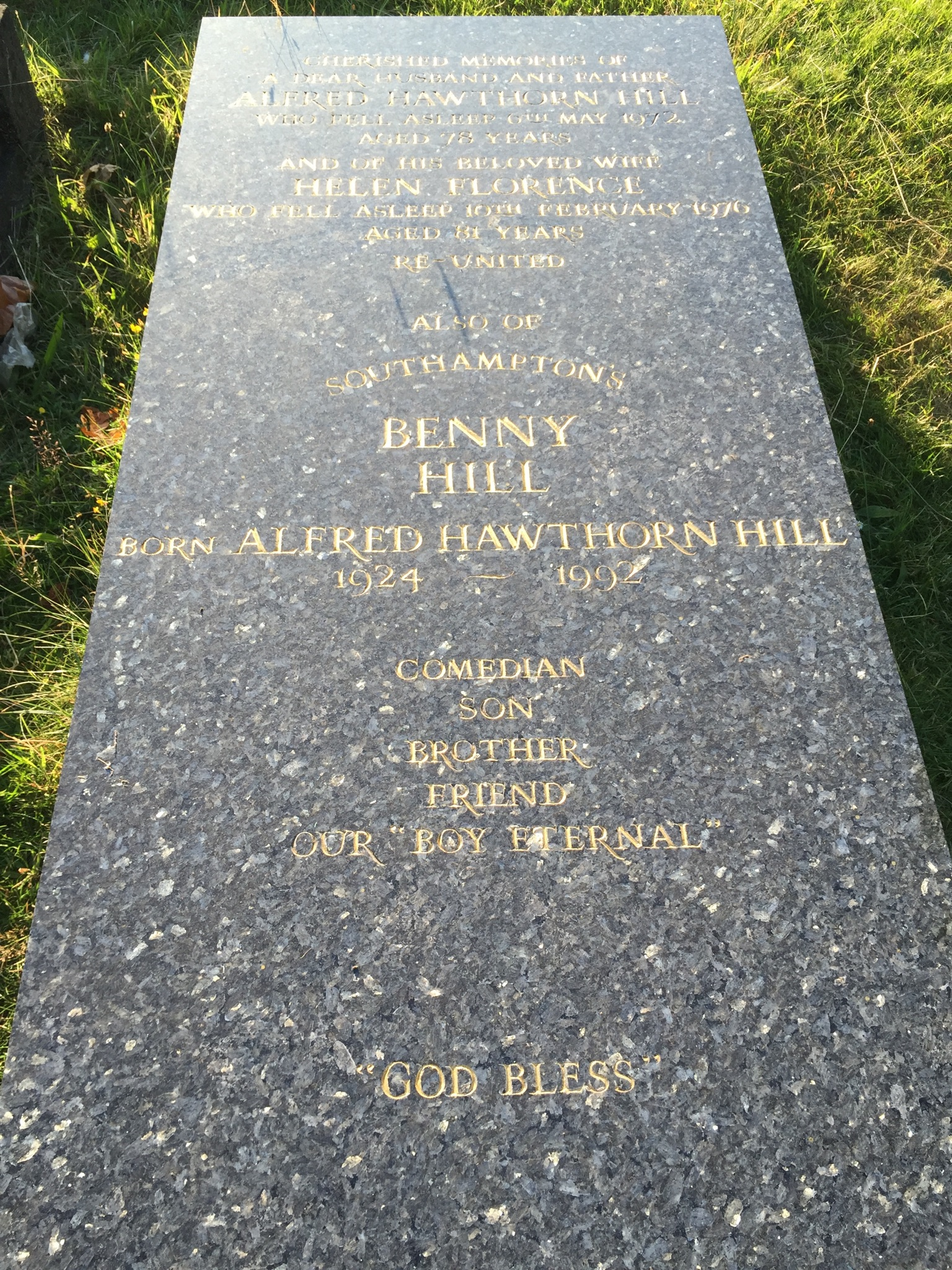
Hill's grave at Hollybrook Cemetery, Southampton

Hill's health began to decline in the late 1980s, shortly after his contract with Thames Television had ended. After he had a mild heart attack on 24 February 1992, his doctors recommended a heart bypass; but he declined. A week later, Hill's health worsened after he was found to have kidney failure, but he refused to undergo kidney dialysis. He died while watching television, seated in an armchair at his flat in Teddington on 18 April 1992 at age 68 but his body was not found until two days later. The official cause of death was recorded as coronary thrombosis. Hill was buried at Hollybrook Cemetery, near his birthplace in Southampton, on 28 April 1992.

Hill's estate was probated at £7,548,192, equivalent to £16,700,000 in 2025. Ultimately, Hill's estate was divided among his seven nieces and nephews.

During the night of 4 October 1992, following speculation that Hill had been buried with a large amount of gold and jewellery, grave robbers exhumed and broke open Hill's coffin. The coffin was reburied and covered with a thick concrete slab.

== Legacy ==
He was a God of British comedy. It's a real skill to make the whole world laugh like he did.

— Garry Bushell, TV critic

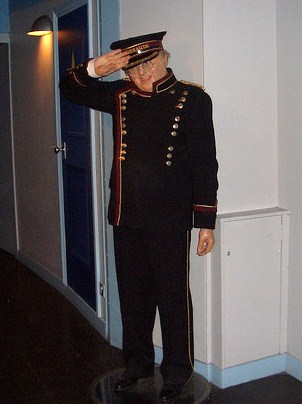
Wax figure of Hill at Madame Tussauds, London

In 1998, Channel 4 featured Hill in one of its Heroes of Comedy programmes. In 2002, D. J. Taylor of The Independent ranked him the third greatest British comedian of the 20th century, after Charlie Chaplin and Stan Laurel.

On 28 December 2006, Channel 4 broadcast the documentary, Is Benny Hill Still Funny? The programme featured an audience that comprised a cross-section of young adults who had little or no knowledge of Hill, to discover whether his comedy was valid to a generation that enjoyed the likes of Little Britain, The Catherine Tate Show and Borat. The participants favourably rated a 30-minute compilation that included examples of Hill's humour from his BBC and ITV shows.

In November 2021, That's TV announced that The Benny Hill Show would feature in its Christmas schedule, alongside other ITV programmes, such as Beadle's About and Kenny Everett's New Year Specials. In addition to operating a number of local television channels on Freeview, That's TV had another national slot on channel 65, meaning that Hill's show would be seen in full, nationwide on British television, for the first time for nearly 20 years.

== Book sources ==
- Hill, Leonard. Saucy Boy: The Life Story of Benny Hill. London: Grafton, 1990 (hardcover); ISBN 9780246134271. London: Grafton/HarperCollins, 1991 (paperback); ISBN 9780586205211.
- Kirkland, Dennis, with Hillary Bonner. The Strange and Saucy World of Benny Hill. London: Blake Publishing, 2002 (paperback): ISBN 9781857825459.
- Lewisohn, Mark. Funny, Peculiar: The True Story of Benny Hill. London: Sidgwick & Jackson/Pan Macmillan, 2002 (hardcover); ISBN 9780283063695. London: Pan Books Ltd, 2003 (paperback); ISBN 9780330393409.
- Smith, John. The Benny Hill Story. "With a Foreword by Bob Monkhouse" (British edition). London: W.H. Allen, 1988 (hardcover); ISBN 9780491032780. "With a Foreword by Bob Hope" (U.S. edition). New York: St. Martin's Press, 1989 (hardcover); ISBN 9780312028671.
