= The Benny Hill Show =

British comedy television series (1955–1989)

- Genre: Sketch comedy
- Written by: Benny Hill (all); Dave Freeman (BBC)
- Starring: Benny Hill
- Theme music composer: Boots Randolph; James Q. Rich
- Ending theme: "Yakety Sax"
- Country of origin: United Kingdom
- Original language: English
- No. of series: 8 (BBC); 1 (ATV); 19 (Thames)
- No. of episodes: 34 (BBC); 9 (ATV); 58 (Thames); 101 (total); (list of episodes)

Production
- Camera setup: Multi-camera
- Running time: 45–60 minutes
- Production companies: BBC; ATV; Thames Television

Original release
- Network: BBC1
- Release: 15 January 1955 – 26 December 1968
- Network: ITV (ATV)
- Release: 9 November 1957 – 28 May 1960
- Network: ITV (Thames)
- Release: 16 November 1969 – 1 May 1989

The Benny Hill Show is a British comedy television series starring Benny Hill that aired on the BBC and ITV between 15 January 1955 and 1 May 1989. The show consisted mainly of sketches typified by slapstick, mime, parody, and double entendre.

At its peak, The Benny Hill Show was among the most-watched programmes in the UK, with the audience reaching more than 21 million viewers in 1971. In 1972, Hill received a BAFTA Television Award for Best Writer, and he was nominated for the BAFTA for Best Entertainment Performance. In the late 1970s, the Thames Television edited version of the show, directed by Dennis Kirkland, gained a cult following in the United States, where it was broadcast in syndication until 1991. In 1980 and 1981, the show received Emmy Award nominations for Outstanding Variety Series. In 1984, Hill received a Rose d'Or.

In 1989, Thames cancelled production of The Benny Hill Show in the face of declining ratings and increased production costs at £450,000 (equivalent to £1,200,000 in 2025) per show. In a 2015 UK poll, the show's theme song was voted number 1 on the ITV special The Sound of ITV – The Nation's Favourite Theme Tune.

== Show format ==
The Benny Hill Show features Benny Hill in various short comedy sketches and occasional, extravagant musical performances by artists of the time. Hill appears in many different costumes and portrays a vast array of characters. Slapstick, burlesque, and double entendres are his hallmarks. Critics accused the show of sexism and objectification of women, but Hill argued that the female characters kept their dignity while the men who chased them were portrayed as buffoons.

The show often uses undercranking and sight gags to create what Hill called "live animation", employing comedic techniques such as mime and parody. The show typically closes with a sped-up chase scene involving Hill and often a crew of scantily clad women but mostly with other characters involved in the scene (usually with Hill being the one chased, due to silly predicaments that he himself caused), accompanied by the instrumental "Yakety Sax", in a send-up on the stereotypical Keystone Cops chase scenes. Hill also composed and sang patter songs and often entertained his audience with lengthy high-speed double-entendre rhymes and songs, which he recited or sang in a single take.

Hill also used the television camera to create comedic illusions. For example, in a murder mystery farce entitled "Murder on the Oregon Express" from 1976 (a parody of Murder on the Orient Express), Hill used editing, camera angles and impersonations to depict a Quinn Martin–like TV "mystery" featuring Hill in the roles of 1970s American television detectives Ironside, McCloud, Kojak and Cannon, plus Hercule Poirot.

During his television career, Hill performed impersonations or parodies of such American celebrities as W. C. Fields, Orson Welles (renamed "Orson Buggy"), Kenny Rogers, Marlon Brando, Raymond Burr, and fictional characters that range from The Six Million Dollar Man and Starsky & Hutch to The A-Team (parodied as "The B-Team", in which he played the roles of both Hannibal and B.A.) and Cagney & Lacey. He also impersonated such international celebrities as Nana Mouskouri and Miriam Makeba as well as British stars such as Shirley Bassey, Michael Caine (in his Alfie role), newscasters Reginald Bosanquet, Alan Whicker and Cliff Michelmore, pop-music show hosts Jimmy Savile and Tony Blackburn, musician Roger Whittaker, his former 1960s record producer Tony Hatch, political figures Lord Boothby and Denis Healey and Irish comedian Dave Allen. On a few occasions, Hill even impersonated his former straight man, Nicholas Parsons. A spoof of Who's Afraid of Virginia Woolf? saw him playing both Richard Burton and Elizabeth Taylor.

== Production notes ==
The show's closing theme tune, "Yakety Sax", which has gained a following in its own right, was written by James Q. "Spider" Rich and Boots Randolph. The show's musical director was pianist and easy listening conductor Ronnie Aldrich, and vocal backing was provided by session singers the Ladybirds (who also frequently appeared on camera from 1969 to 1974). The saxophone soloist on Aldrich's version of "Yakety Sax" was Peter Hughes. For three episodes of the 1973–1974 season, Albert Elms filled in for Aldrich as musical director. "Yakety Sax" first appeared in the 19 November 1969 episode, which was also the first show for Thames.

Another signature of the show was the enthusiastic announcer intro: "Yes! It's The Benny Hill Show!" (The announcer was often cast member Henry McGee.) From 1975 forward, Hill was also introduced at the start of each show as "The Lad Himself". The show closed with Hill's salute: "Thank you for being with us, and we look forward to seeing you all again—very, very soon. Until then, bye bye."

== Characters ==
Hill created both long-running fictional characters, such as Fred Scuttle, and frequently spoof impersonations of other TV personalities of the day, usually tweaking names for comic effect:

- Johnny and Cranny Faddock (Johnny and Fanny Cradock)
- Husky and Starch (Starsky & Hutch)
- Cinema with Clive Janes (Clive James)
- Charlene's Angels/ Archie's Angels (Charlie's Angels)
- The Scarlet Pimple (The Scarlet Pimpernel)
- Barry Normal (Barry Norman)
- James Gaulstone (James Galway)

== Cast ==
The main supporting cast included Henry McGee, Jon Jon Keefe, Ken Sedd, Nicholas Parsons, Bob Todd, Cyril Cross and Jackie Wright.

The regular "sexpot"-type women included Jenny Lee-Wright, Sue Bond, Moira Foot, Bettina Le Beau, Lesley Goldie, Cherri Gilham and Diana Darvey. In later years, the show included a dance troupe, the Hill's Angels, which was briefly preceded by the Love Machine. Most regular among the Angels were Sue Upton and Louise English, whilst others like Corinne Russell and Jane Leeves also appeared in a few episodes in the early 1980s; among those who appeared only once were Susan Clark and Sue McIntosh.

The female singing group The Ladybirds, featuring the bespectacled Maggie Stredder, were regulars on the show as background singers to Hill during the early 1970s, and occasionally singing numbers on their own.

Character actresses included Anna Dawson, Bella Emberg, Rita Webb, Helen Horton and Patricia Hayes.

=== Guest stars ===
- Don Estelle
- Paul Eddington
- Liz Fraser
- Stella Moray
- Patrick Newell
- Trisha Noble
- Hugh Paddick
- David Prowse
- Kathy Staff
- Percy Thrower
- Dilys Watling
- Carl Wayne
- Paula Wilcox

Occasionally, Hill would briefly chat with his guests on stage.

=== Musical guest stars ===
- Petula Clark
- Alma Cogan
- Kiki Dee
- Design
- Judith Durham
- Cleo Laine
- The Mike Sammes Singers
- Sylvia McNeill
- Anne Shelton
- The Springfields

Hill also gave the first major exposure to some non-British-based musical groups, including Luis Alberto del Paraná and Los Paraguayos. With few exceptions, most of the musical numbers did not make it to the American syndicated series.

== Episodes ==
Season	Television	Episodes	Originally released (UK)	
Season	Television	Episodes	First released	Last released
Season 1	BBC	3	15 January 1955	12 May 1955
Season 2	BBC	6	5 January 1957	1 June 1957
Season 3	BBC/ITV	6	9 November 1957	26 April 1958
Season 4	BBC/ITV	4	24 September 1958	24 January 1959
Season 5	ITV	3	2 April 1960	28 May 1960
Season 6	BBC	3	4 February 1961	1 April 1961
Season 7	BBC	3	4 November 1961	6 December 1961
Season 8	BBC	5	6 November 1964	22 May 1965
Season 9	BBC	4	6 November 1965	8 January 1966
Special 1	BBC	1	6 May 1967	
Season 10	ITV/BBC	2	26 December 1967	20 April 1968
Season 11	BBC	3	20 November 1968	26 December 1968
Season 12	Thames	4	16 November 1969	11 March 1970
Season 13	Thames	5	28 October 1970	24 March 1971
Season 14	Thames	4	24 November 1971	22 March 1972
Season 15	Thames	3	25 October 1972	29 March 1973
Season 16	Thames	4	5 December 1973	13 March 1974
Season 17	Thames	2	8 January 1975	12 March 1975
Season 18	Thames	5	24 September 1975	21 April 1976
Season 19	Thames	3	26 January 1977	23 March 1977
Special 2	Thames	1	30 May 1978	
Season 20	Thames	3	26 December 1978	25 May 1979
Season 21	Thames	3	6 February 1980	16 April 1980
Season 22	Thames	3	7 January 1981	25 May 1981
Season 23	Thames	2	6 January 1982	10 February 1982
Season 24	Thames	2	5 January 1983	16 March 1983
Season 25	Thames	2	16 January 1984	25 April 1984
Season 26	Thames	3	2 January 1985	27 May 1985
Season 27	Thames	3	12 March 1986	16 April 1986
Season 28	Thames	2	13 January 1988	27 April 1988
Season 29	Thames	3	8 February 1989	1 May 1989
Special 3	USA Network	1	30 May 1991	

== Cancellation ==
In May 1989, Thames Television's Head of Light Entertainment since March 1988, John Howard Davies, invited Hill in for a meeting. Having just returned from a triumphant Cannes TV festival, Hill assumed that they were to discuss details of a new series. Instead, Davies informed Hill that his programme would discontinue production, and that he was dismissing Hill himself. In an episode about Hill from the documentary series Living Famously, Davies stated there were three reasons why he did so: "The audiences were going down, the programme was costing a vast amount of money, and he (Hill) was looking a little tired." His shows had earned Thames £100 million, with a large percentage due to the success of his shows in the United States. At its peak in 1971, 21.63 million viewers in the UK watched Hill's show. In 1989, the last Thames episode attracted 9.58 million viewers. Despite declining ratings in the UK, the show was still one of Britain's most successful TV exports, airing in 97 other countries.

Even though it was a ratings winner in the 1970s and 80s, in the 21st century The Benny Hill Show was not repeated in full on national TV for 20 years, until That's TV announced that the programme would feature in its Christmas schedule, alongside other ITV programmes like Beadle's About and Kenny Everett's New Year Specials.

== Programme list ==
- The Benny Hill Show, broadcast on BBC Television/BBC 1; musical directors Eric Robinson, Bob Sharples, Harry Rabinowitz, Cyril Ornadel, Burt Rhodes
  - 15 January – 12 March 1955 (3 episodes)
  - 5 January – 1 June 1957 (6 episodes)
  - 1 February – 26 April 1958 (4 episodes)
  - 24 September 1958
  - 4 February – 1 April 1961 (3 episodes)
  - 4 November – 16 December 1961 (3 episodes)
  - 6 November 1964
  - 10 April – 22 May 1965 (4 episodes)
  - 6 November 1965 – 8 January 1966 (4 episodes)
  - 6 May 1967
  - 20 April 1968
  - 20 November – 26 December 1968 (3 episodes)
  - 34 episodes were made in 8 series (in black & white).
- The Benny Hill Show, made by ATV and broadcast on ITV; musical director Jack Parnell
  - 9 November 1957 – 1960 (8 episodes)
  - 26 December 1967
  - Nine episodes were made (in b&w).
- The Benny Hill Show, made by Thames and broadcast on ITV; musical director Ronnie Aldrich
  - 1969–1986
  - 1988–1989
  - 58 episodes were made (in colour, except ep. 6-8, in b&w due to the Colour Strike).
- Benny Hill Down Under
  - 1977 special broadcast on Channel 10
  - one episode (in colour).
- Benny Hill's World Tour: New York!
  - 1991 special broadcast on the USA Network
  - one episode (in colour).

== Other programmes featuring Benny Hill ==
- Hi There!, broadcast on BBC TV (1951). One episode was made.
- The Centre Show, broadcast on BBC TV (1953). Seven episodes were made. After the first episode, this was retitled The Forces Show.
- Showcase, broadcast on BBC TV (1954). Eight episodes were made.
- Benny Hill, broadcast on BBC TV (23 February 1962 – 3 December 1963). Sitcom where Hill played a different role every week. 19 episodes were made in three series.
- Star Parade: The Benny Hill Show, a radio show on the BBC Light Programme (28 March – 25 August 1963, three episodes)
- The Waiters (1969). 30-minute silent film (cinema release).
- Eddie in August (1970). 25-minute silent film.
- Omnibus Benny Hill – Clown Imperial BBC One (1991). An hour long documentary of his life, with commentary from celebrities.

== DVD releases ==
In 2004, the hour-long Thames specials were released uncut (except for ad-break bumpers) in a six-set, 18 disc Region 1 DVD collection for the U.S. by A&E Home Video (under license from Thames, talkbackTHAMES and FremantleMedia International), entitled Benny Hill: Complete & Unadulterated. Each DVD set has three discs, representing multiple years of the show in order of the original show airings, with "Benny Hill Trivia Challenges", a booklet containing a listing of sketches from each DVD disk, and documentary extras. All 58 episodes of the Thames years (1969–1989) were showcased in the collection, but Hill's 1977 Australian TV special ("Down Under") was not, and it remains unavailable on DVD.

In 2005, the Thames specials began to appear uncut (including the original ad-break bumpers) in Region 2 DVD sets, each representing one year and entitled The Benny Hill Annual. Sets for each year from 1970 through 1989 have been released on DVD by Network. Two box sets were released of the 1970–1979 Annuals and 1980–1989 Annuals, with a set containing all the Annuals "double bundled up together".

In 2005, Warner Home Video released a DVD featuring a three-hour collection of clips from some of the surviving black-and-white episodes Hill did for the BBC in the 1950s and 1960s (roughly half of them no longer exist) on Region 1 DVD as Benny Hill: The Lost Years. In Australia, Via Vision released The Benny Hill Annuals complete box set (1970–1989) on 3 August 2022.
