= National Central Library (Florence) =

Public national library in Florence, Italy

National Central Library of Florence
- Biblioteca Nazionale Centrale di Firenze
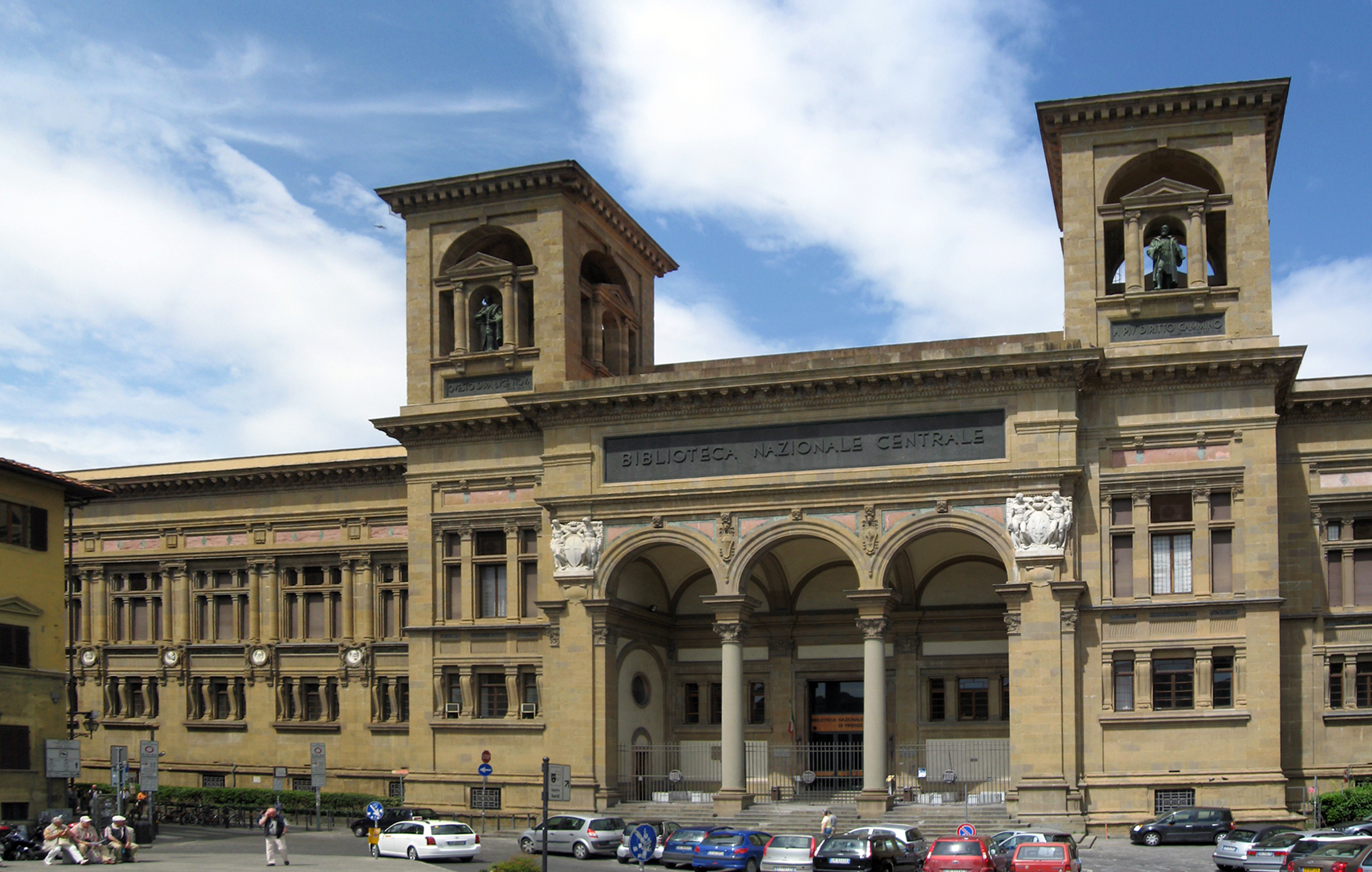
- View of the Library from Piazza dei Cavalleggeri
- 43°46′01″N 11°15′44″E
- Location: Florence, Italy
- Type: Public, national library
- Established: 1714 (312 years ago)

Collection
- Size: 6,000,000 books, 2,689,672 pamphlets, 1,000,000+ autographs, 120,000 magazines, 29,000 16th century editions, 25,000 manuscripts and 4,000 Incunabula.

Access and use
- Access requirements: Access granted to anyone aged 16 or over. You must have a card to enter, which is valid for 1 year.

Other information
- Director: Elisabetta Sciarra
- Website: www.bncf.firenze.sbn.it

The National Central Library of Florence (Italian: Biblioteca Nazionale Centrale di Firenze, BNCF) is a public national library in Florence, the largest in Italy and one of the most important in Europe. It is one of the two central libraries of Italy, along with the Biblioteca Nazionale Centrale di Roma.

== History ==
The library was founded in 1714 when scholar Antonio Magliabechi bequeathed his entire collection of books, encompassing approximately 30,000 volumes, to the city of Florence. By 1743, it was required that a copy of every work published in Tuscany be submitted to the library. Originally known as the Magliabechiana, the library was opened to the public in 1747. Its holdings were combined with those of the Biblioteca Palatina Lorenese in 1861, and by 1885, the library had been renamed as the National Central Library of Florence, or the BNCF. Since 1870, the library has collected copies of all Italian publications.

The construction of the current home of the National Central Library of Florence, located in Piazza dei Cavalleggeri, began in 1911 following a design by architect Cesare Bazzani. The building is one of the rare Italian examples of architecture specifically conceived for library purposes. Inaugurated in 1935, the structure was designed to house the institution’s rapidly growing monumental heritage, featuring an eclectic facade with distinctive turrets and grand reading rooms. Despite its architectural significance, the choice of the site adjacent to the Santa Croce complex proved tragic in 1966, when its proximity to the Arno River exposed the building and its treasures to the devastating flood. Before this, they were found in various rooms belonging to the Uffizi Gallery.

== WWII ==
The Fascists had taken power as early as 1933 and greatly affected the library. Enrollment in the National Fascist Party was one of the requirements for admission to public sector service, with even the most reluctant directors forced to comply. Between 1936 and 1947, the library saw four different directors. In June 1936 Anita Mondolfo became director. Being Jewish and a relative of Rodolfo Mondolfo, a socialist intellectual unpopular with the Fascists, the Political Police immediately compiled a dossier on her. They even had her transferred to the University Library of Padua, however she fought back.

In November 1938 a new Royal Decree Law 1728 was passed stating that all State civil and military administrations were not allowed to "employ persons of the Jewish race," leading to her dismissal. Jewish students, authors, publishers, scholars and books were banned. Laura Luzzatto Coen, the wife of the musician Luigi Dallapiccola and official at the BncF, was removed from the library and later forced into hiding in the apartment of a friend in Fiesole. Anita Mondolfo was even imprisoned, as she was considered an “anti-Fascist Jew” and “capable of disturbing public order”. Gentile once again stepped in to transform her imprisonment into confinement in Montemurro, in the province of Potenza, and later managed to obtain a form of house arrest for his apprentice in Senigallia, Mondolfo’s birthplace. By May 1941 the acting director was Anna Saitta Revignas.

German occupation of the city of Florence led to panic even though the city was granted legal status of an "open city". However, in the wake of episodes of resistance and boycott, as well as in light of news of collaboration and aid between the American forces and representatives of the Florentine Resistance, the German authorities reconsidered and decided to mine all the bridges except for Ponte Vecchio, which was instead surrounded by rubble, to stop crossings and gain more time to deploy the troops along the famous Gothic Line. In order to implement this plan, the Wehrmacht aimed to also bring down the circular tower that housed the Galilean and Dantesque galleries, together with part of the surrounding library. It was the resolve of Saitta Revignas, who was fluent in German, and her impassioned defence of the institution that avoided this catastrophe. Thus, during the night between 4 and 5 August 1944, German mines effectively destroyed the bridges over the Arno, and the German Command, which was preparing for the “Battle of Florence”, ordered all the inhabitants of the Santa Croce district to leave their homes. The order was also made to the director, but she stayed at her post in order to keep a direct eye on the collections. On the morning of 7 August, the Germans burst into the library and were amazed to find the director still there, together with a custodian, rushing to repair the damage caused by the blasts of air coming from exploding bombs. Anna Saitta Revignas was subjected to fierce interrogation, severely reprimanded, and threatened with consequences for her behaviour, eventually being forcibly removed from the library. However, she did not go very far. She asked for refuge from the Franciscan monks in the nearby convent of Santa Croce and remained there to await further developments. Her report to the Ministry revealed that the Germans had used the large windows in the Consultation halls and the niches in the statues of Dante and Galilei as machine-gun nests, and the clock in the reading room for target practice, and had grilled sausages in the Galilean hall. As soon as the German troops were forced to leave the historic centre of Florence, on the morning of 11 August, Anna Saitta Revignas returned to the library to inspect and check the most remote corners of the building, and in the basement she discovered that two cases had been overturned and opened, with papers scattered on the floor. She quickly realised that nothing was missing, and praised the ignorance of the soldier who had failed to recognise the writings of Foscolo that the cases held.

After forces moved away and restoration slowly occurred the Ministry had to decide who to appoint as director, Anita Mondolfo or reward the sacrifice and commitment of Anna Saitta Revignas. Mondolfo was re-appointed and regained her position after eight years of absence. However, The BncF never forgot the passion and the sacrifice of Anna Saitta Revignas, and put up a bronze plaque with the following inscription: “In 1944/Anna Saitta Revignas/Director of this library/and Superintendent for Tuscany/saved from the destruction of war/risking her life/the collections of the National Library/and other Libraries in the Region/that were stored here”.

== Flood ==
A major flood of the Arno River on November 4, 1966 damaged nearly one-third of the library's holdings, most notably its periodicals and Palatine and Magliabechi collections. Almost one million books stored in the basement or on the ground floor were submerged. The most serious damage was caused to newspapers, foreign theses, periodicals and modern works, but above all to approximately 100,000 books from the Library's historical collections. The cataglogues and inventories also suffered serious damage, which were essential tools for library research, with an estimated six million catalogue cards suffering damage.

The extent of the disaster was such that it attracted both financial aid (thanks to CRIA and the IAARF) for Florence and support from technical experts from all over the world, including America, England, Germany, Austria, Australia and Czechoslovakia, as well as others. Of these figures, the commitment of restorers such as Peter Waters, Roger Powell, Don Etherington, Anthony Cains, Christopher Clarkson, Dorothy Cumpstey, Sandy Cockerell, Stella Patri, Richard Young and many others deserves mention. The sheer volume of the situation required the immediate setting up of a laboratory that was large enough to handle the problems facing the institute, which were threatening its very survival as the most important library in Italy.

The then director of the library, Emanuele Casamassima, was exceptional in organizing and identifying new solutions to the various problems. Over the course of just a few weeks, tons of books were extracted from the mud, transported to a safe location, dried and subjected to general cleaning. The laboratory was initially set up in the central heating plant of the railway station but later was moved to the library basement and new wing. The laboratory was set up like a huge assembly line which handed book restoration in a manner that was both necessarily "industrial" and at the same time innovative. Every book was accompanied by a card that described the damage, and original structure.

The number of items from the collections are as follows:

=== Magliabechiana collection ===
52.583 flood-damaged books; 33,015 restored; 15,396 to be restored; 4,172 missing/unidentified

=== Palatina collection ===
9527 flood-damaged books; 6,003 restored; 3,242 to be restored; 282 missing/unidentified

=== Palatina collection file ===
587 flood-damaged records; 500 restored; 5 to be restored; 78 missing/unidentified

=== Miscellanee magliabechiane ===
42012 miscellaneous flood-damaged items (the number of miscellaneous antique flood-damaged items cannot be determined with precision, and therefore the number represents the total identified to date); 11,781 restored; 30,231 to be restored; — missing/unidentified (the number of miscellaneous items missing cannot be calculated as the identification of unclassified materials is still under way).

The library still is working to restore the artifacts damaged in the flood and cotinue to work with the help of volunteers to catalogue the missing items. However, much work remains to be done and some items are forever lost.

== Services ==
The library curates the Nuovo soggettario, a "subject indexing tool for various types of resources".

The National Library System (SBN) is responsible for the automation of library services and the indexing of national holdings.

The Italian National Bibliography (BNI) collects Italian publications on the basis of items sent for legal deposit by publishers to the National Central Library of Florence in compliance with the relative regulations. The BNI contains information on publications from the current year, in order of arrival, as well as for publications from up to two years prior.

Magazzini Digitali (Digital Archives) is the national service for conserving and accessing digital documents of cultural interest, organised by the National Central Library of Florence (BNCF) in collaboration with the National Central Library of Rome (BNCR) and the Marciana Library of Venice (BNM). The Magazzini Digitali conserve and render accessible two types of resources: Born-digital resources acquired through legal or voluntary deposit by the National Central Libraries and Digital resources produced as part of the digitalisation projects concerning the collections of libraries and cultural institutions. Archived materials can be searched for via the BNCF online catalogue (OPAC) and the BNCF collection on Archive-it.

The library offers a national and international interlibrary and direct loan service. Additionally, the library loans materials from its collections for temporary exhibitions or events of significant scientific or cultural value both in Italy and abroad.

== Gallery ==
=== Exteriors ===
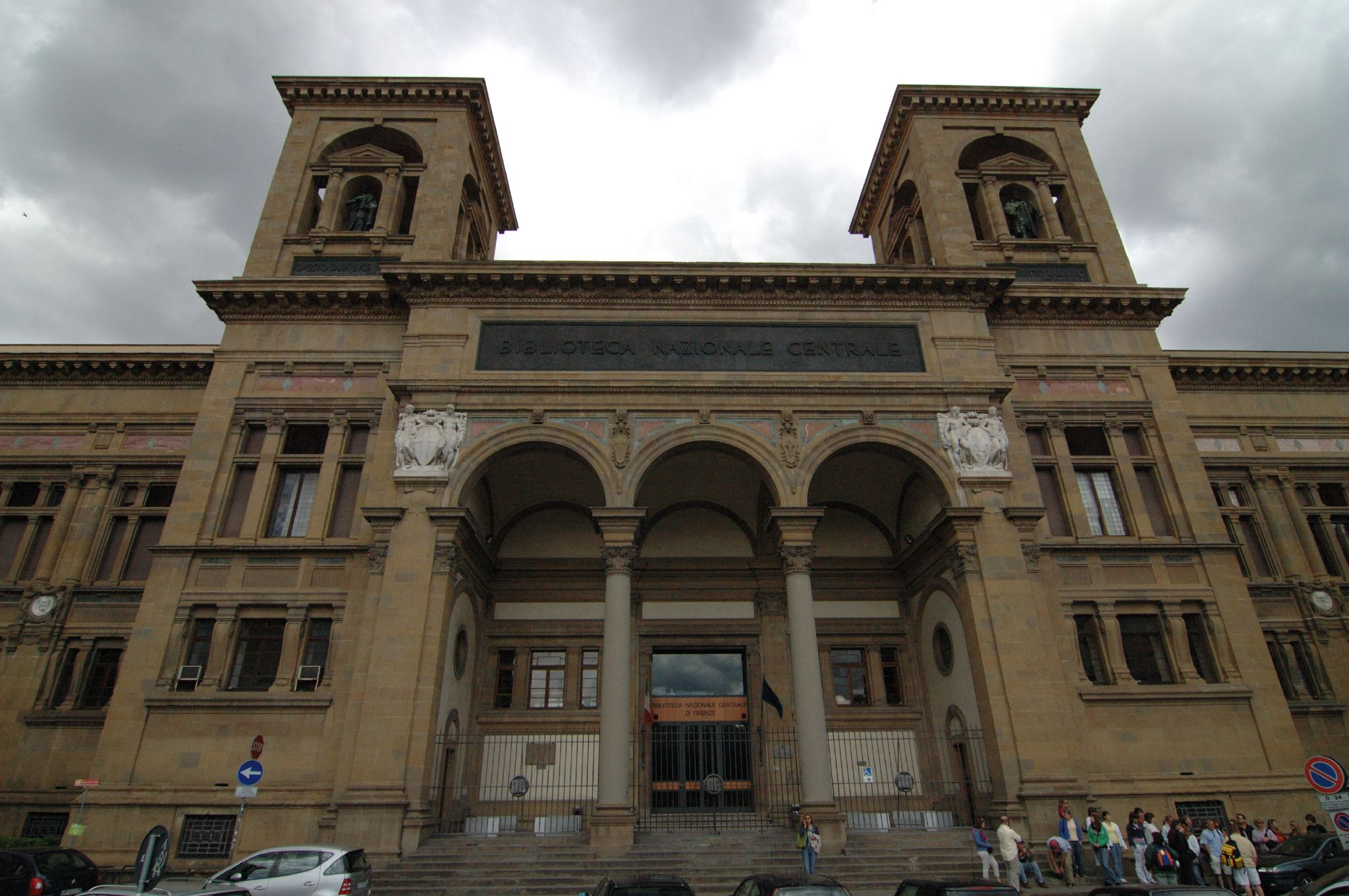
Arno river facade

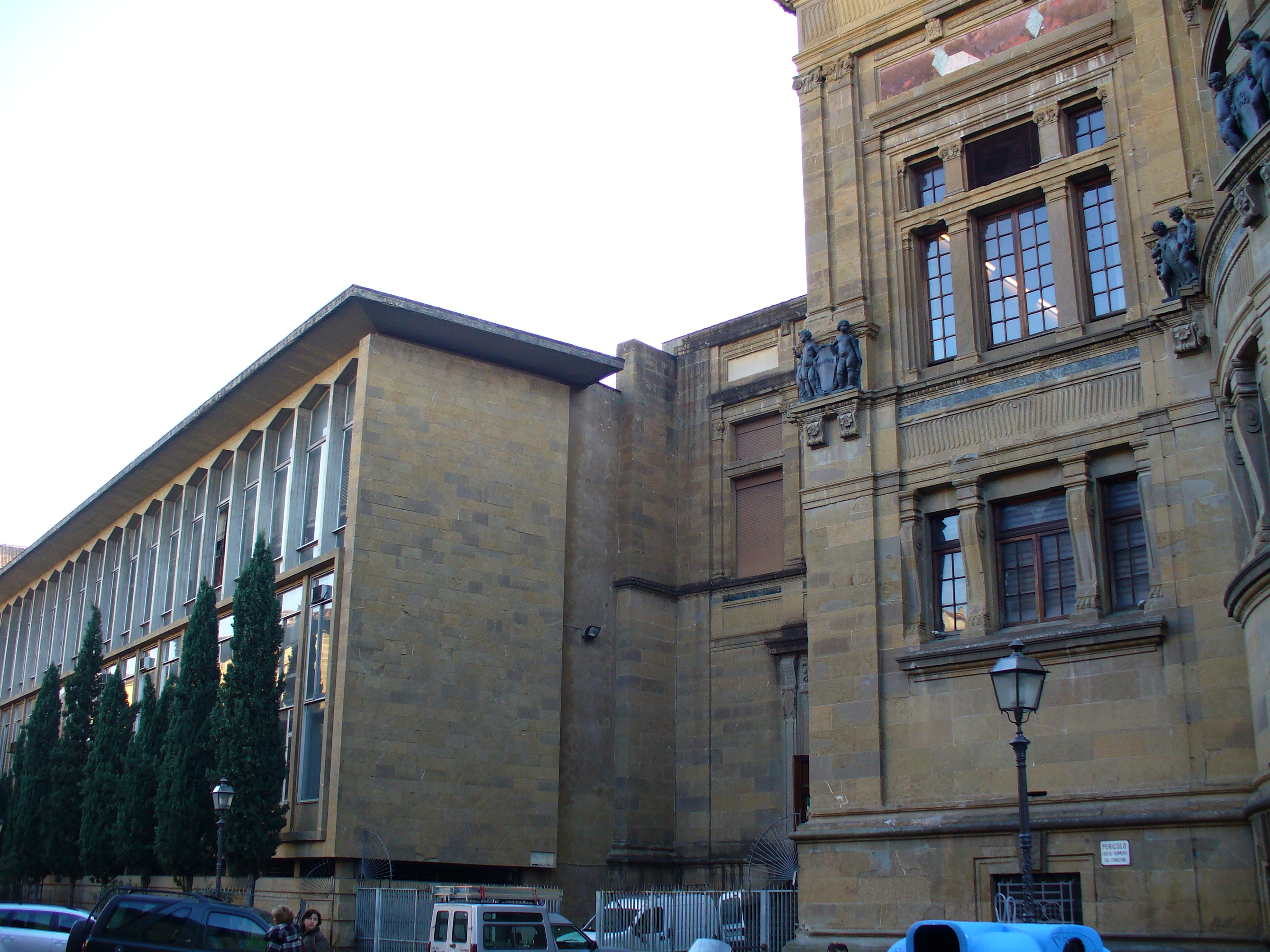
The library beside Santa Croce

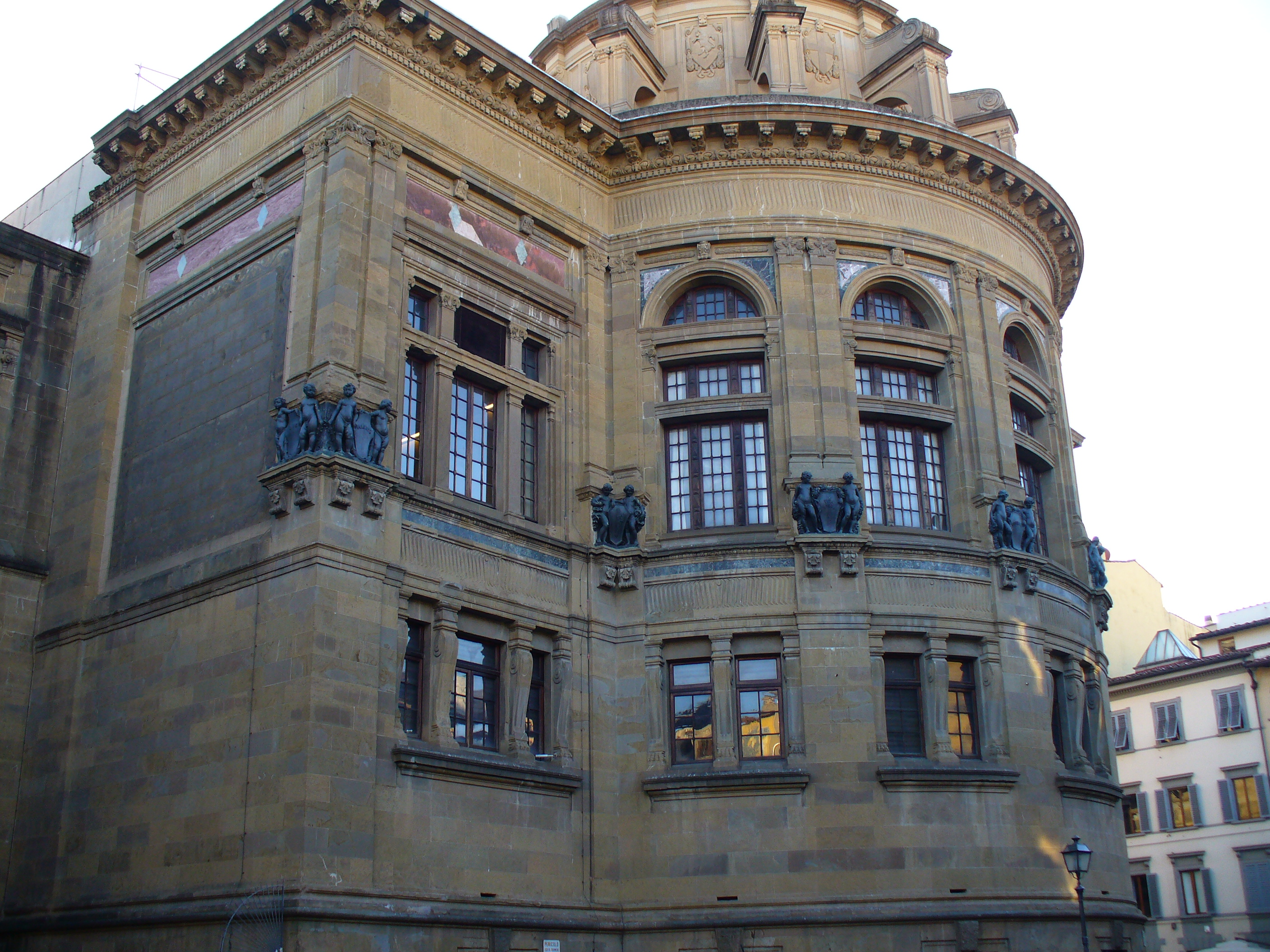
The rotunda

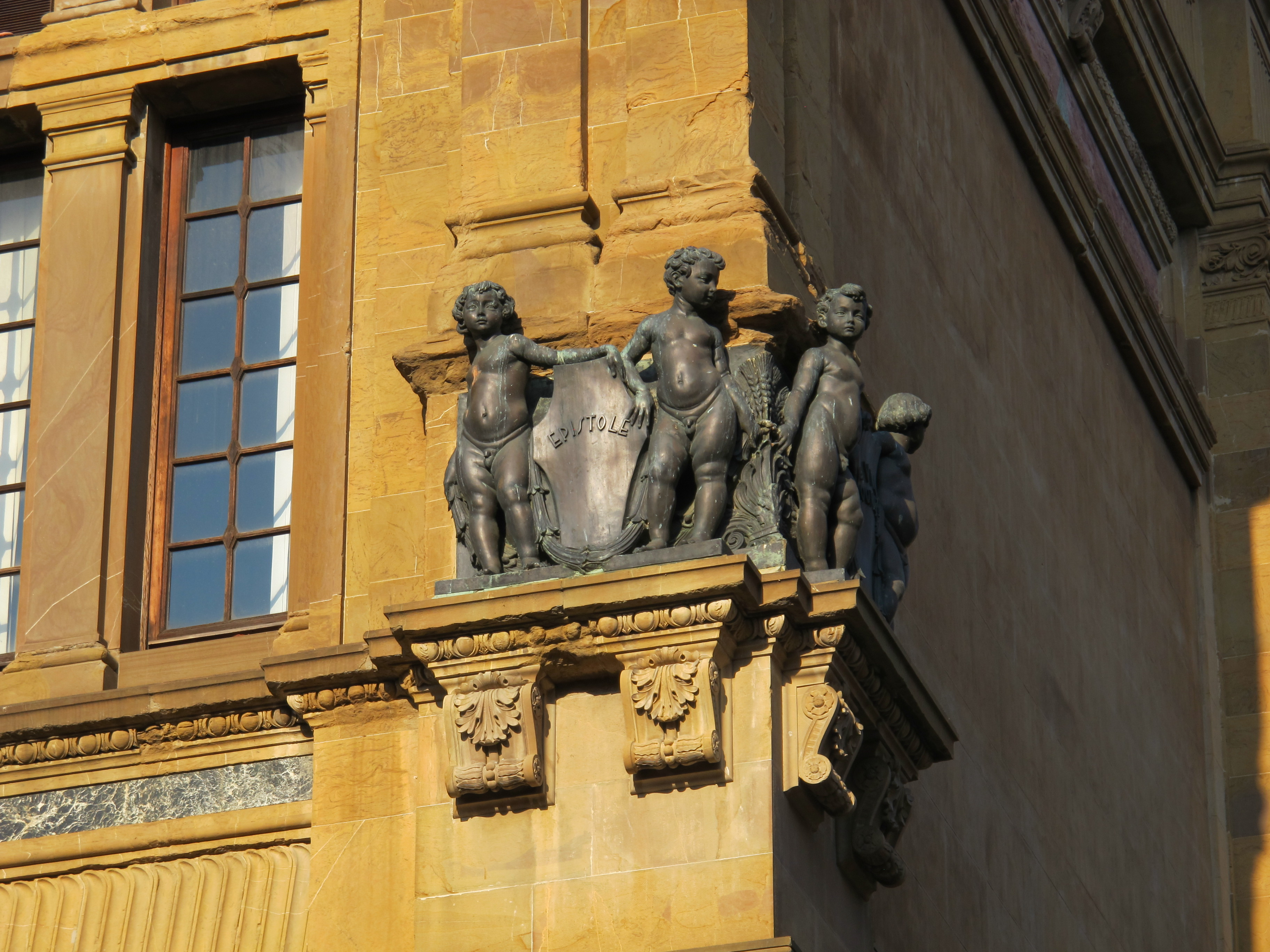
Bronze cherubs on the facade

=== Interiors ===
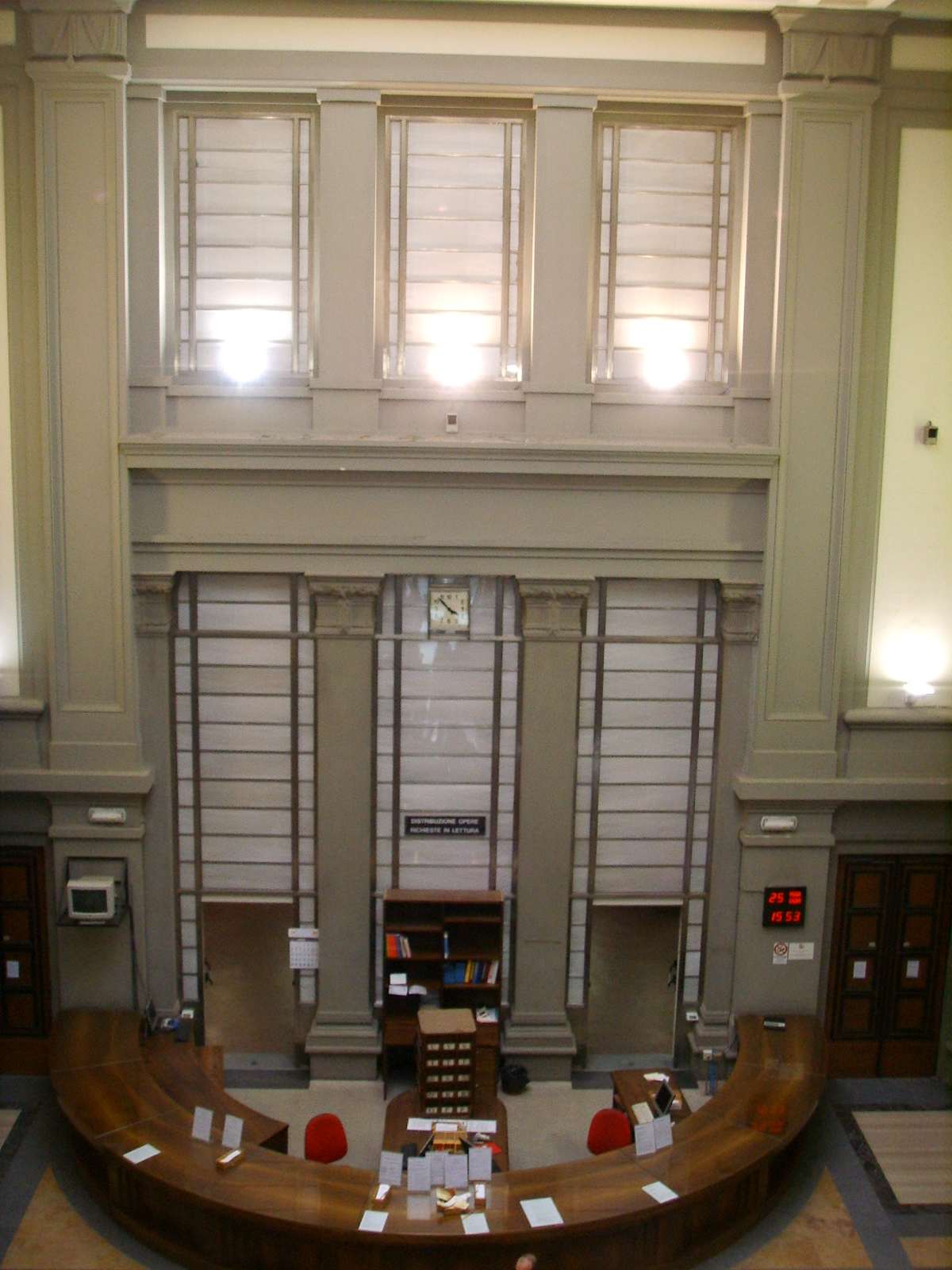
The distribution hall

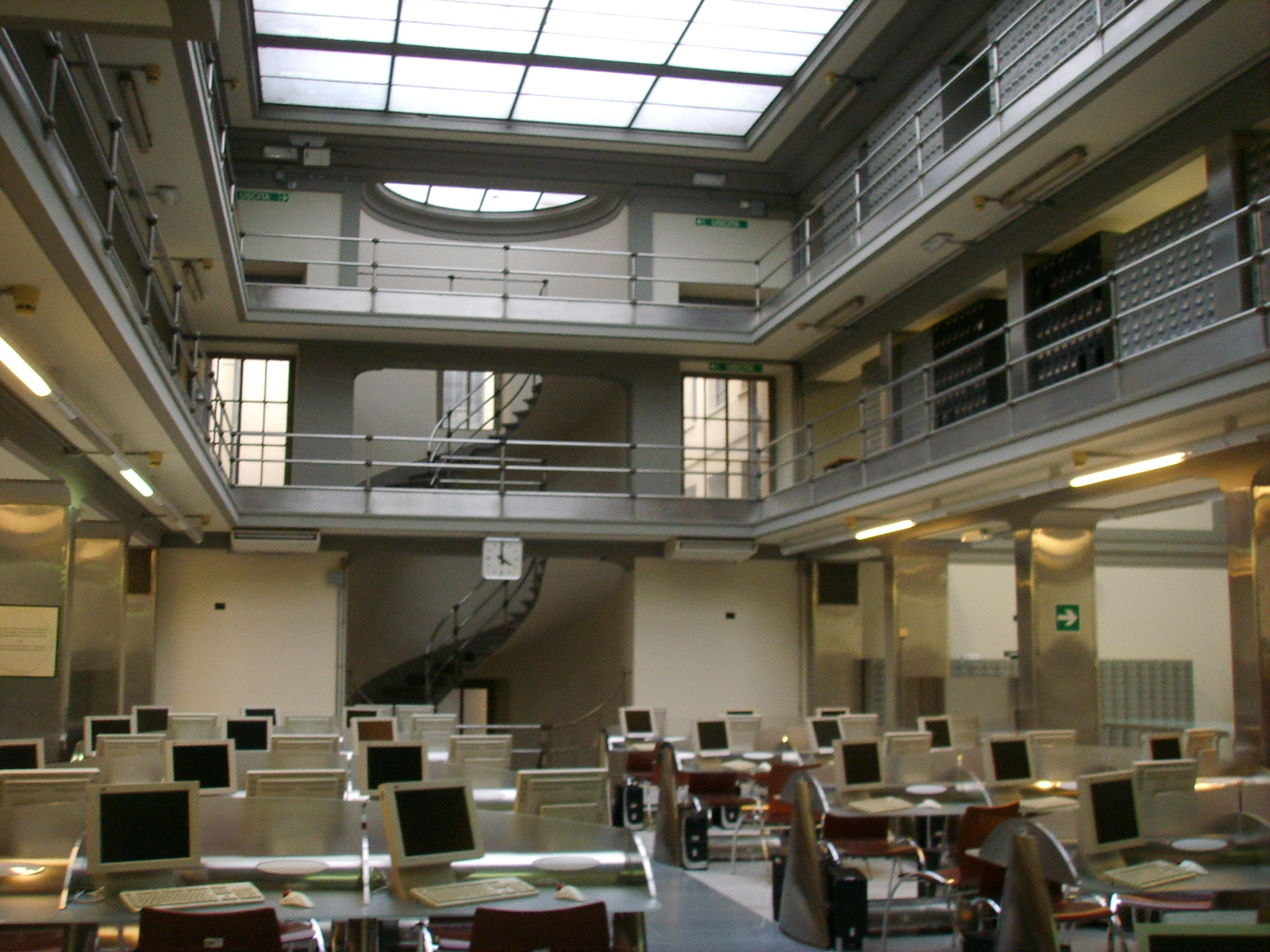
The catalogues room

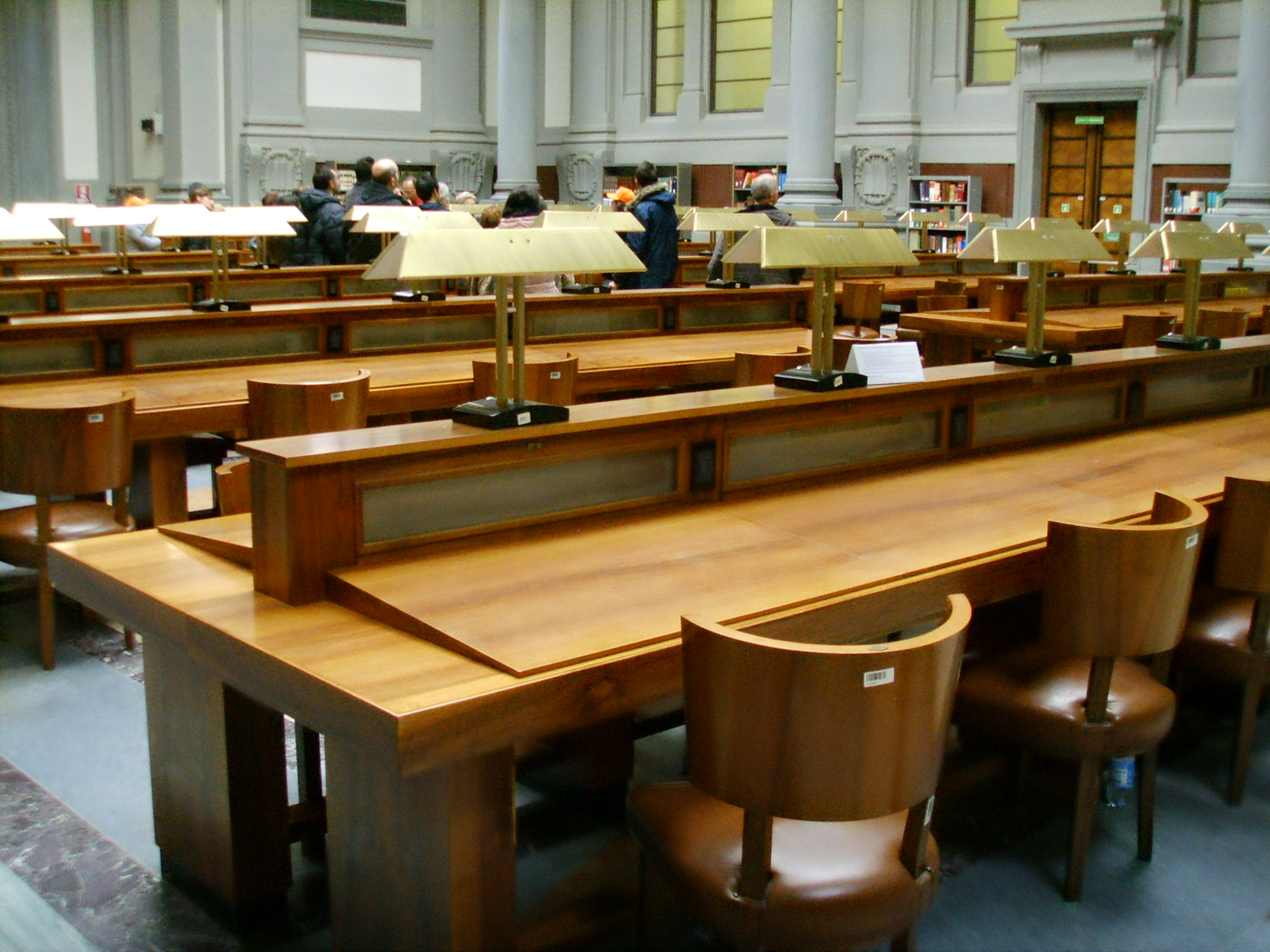
The reading room

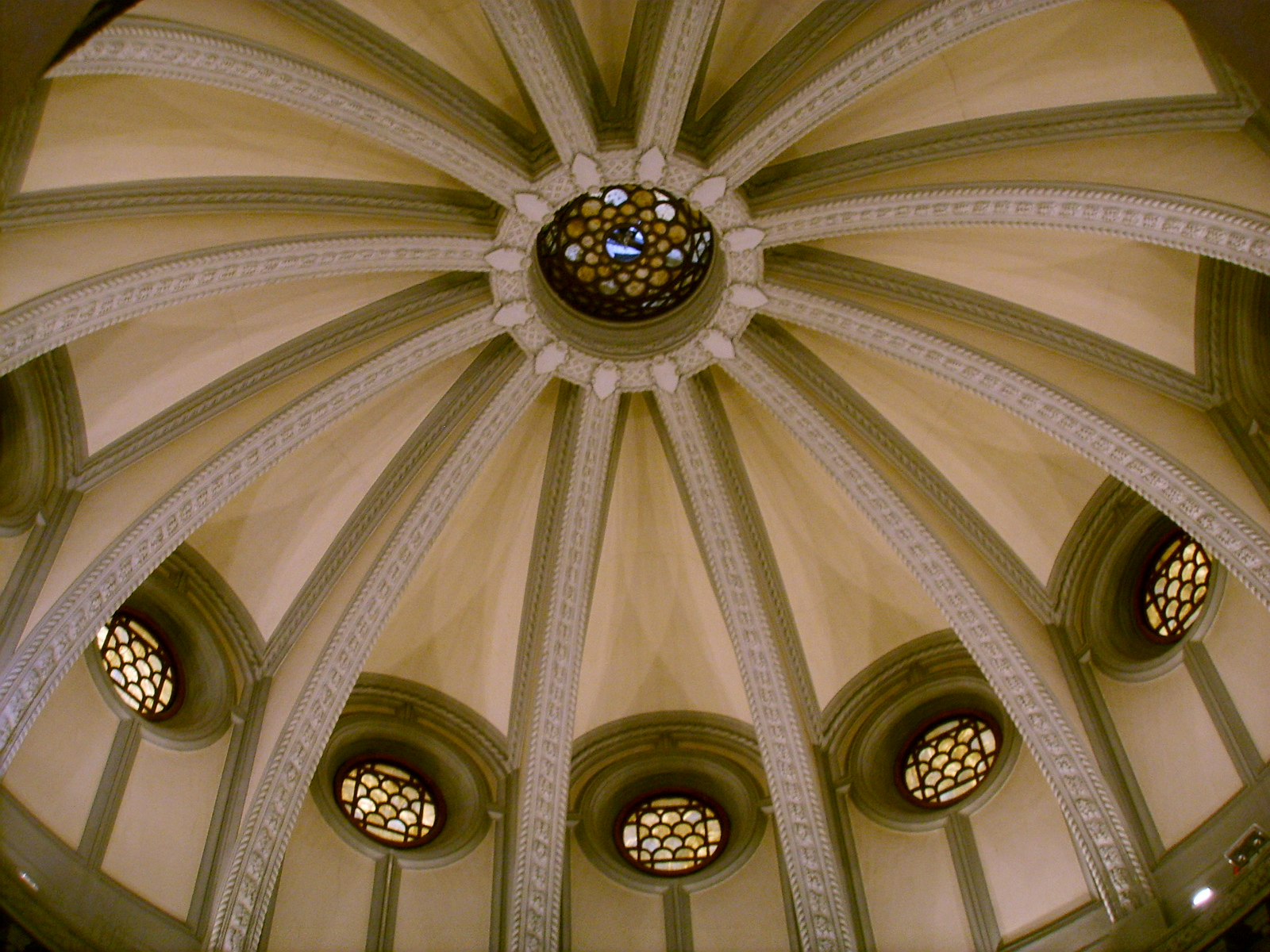
The Galileo's dome.

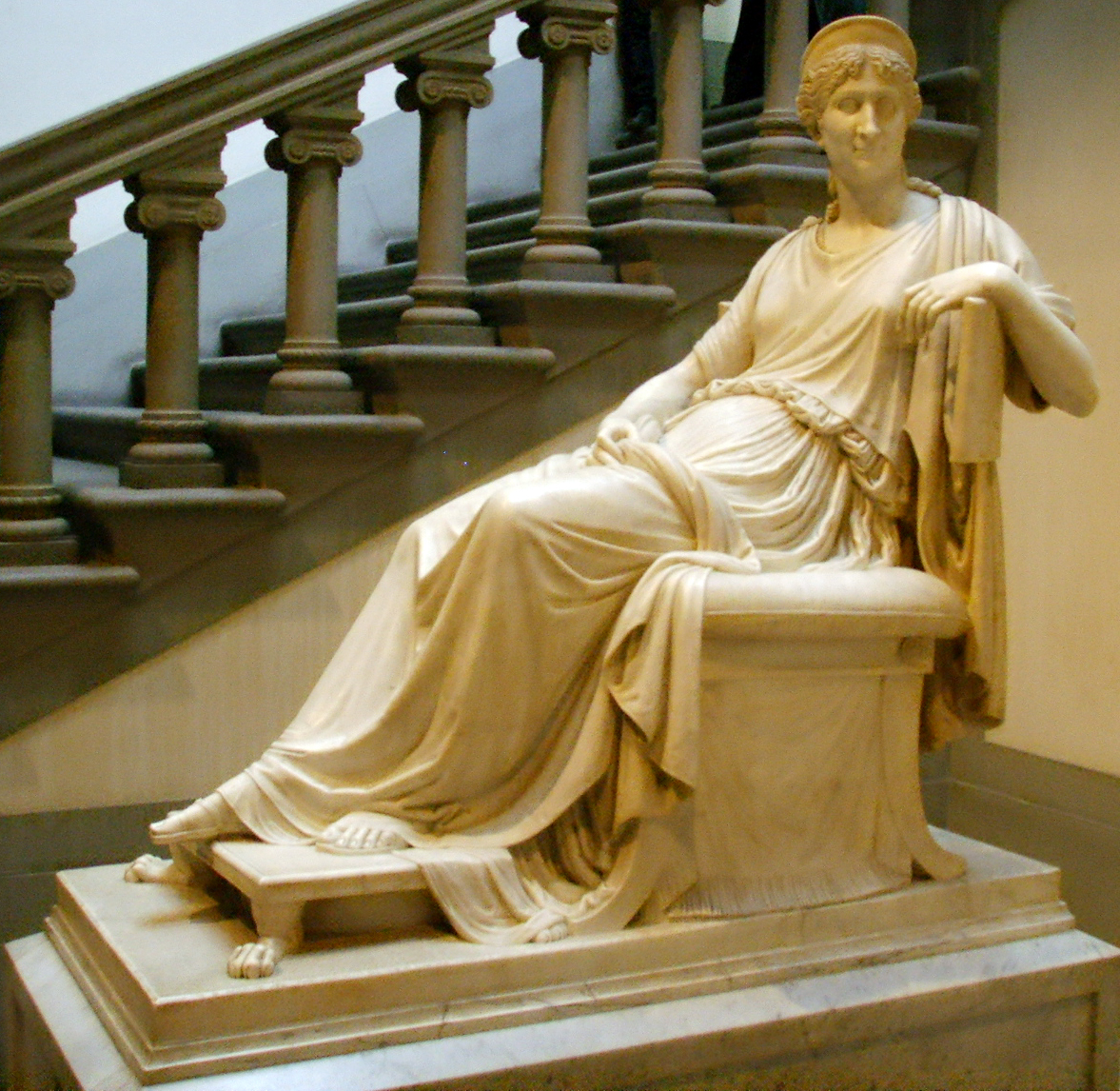
Statue of Letizia Ramolino (1750-1836), mother of Napoleon

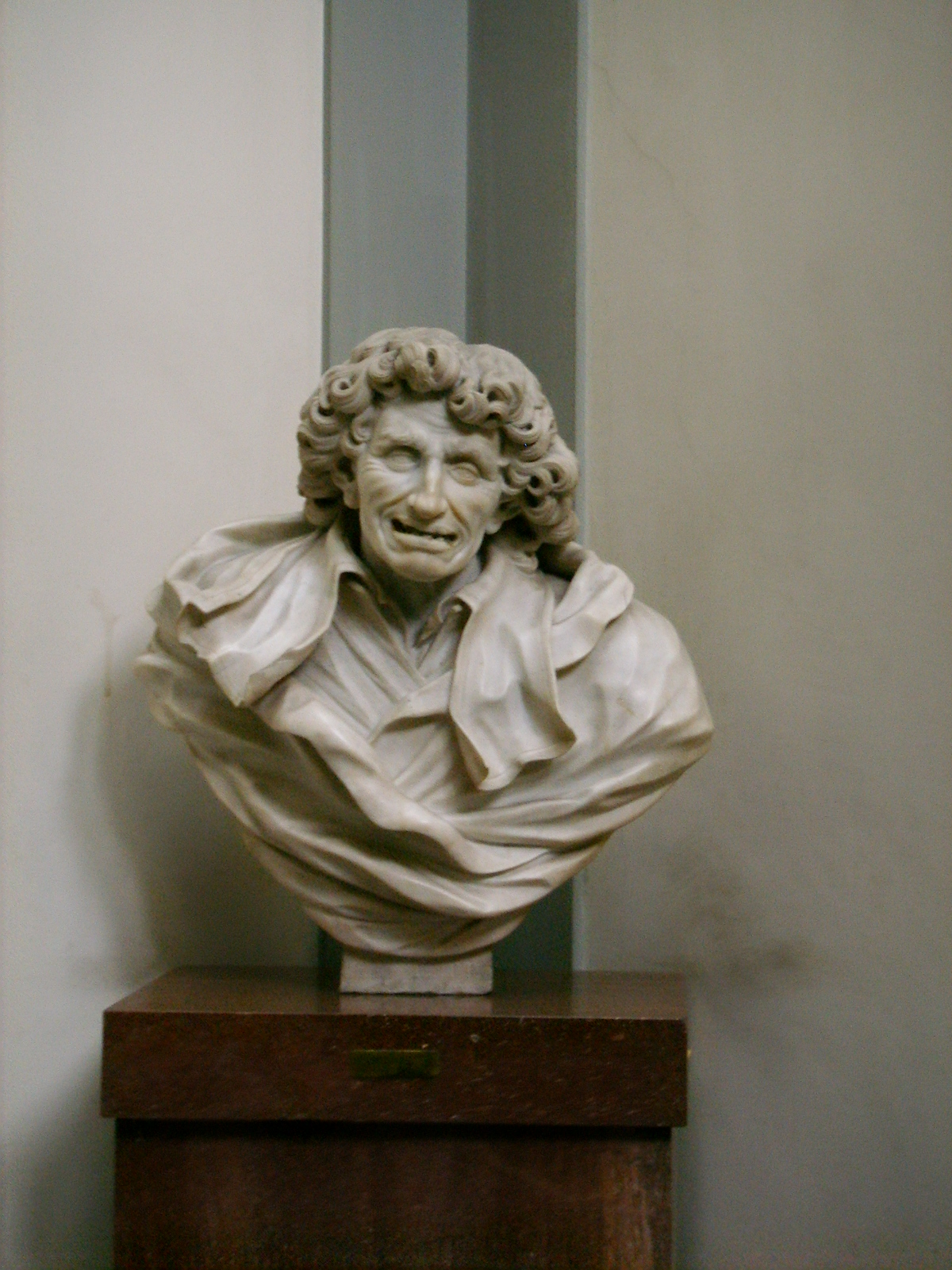
Bust of Antonio Magliabechi (1633-1714)

=== Manuscripts ===
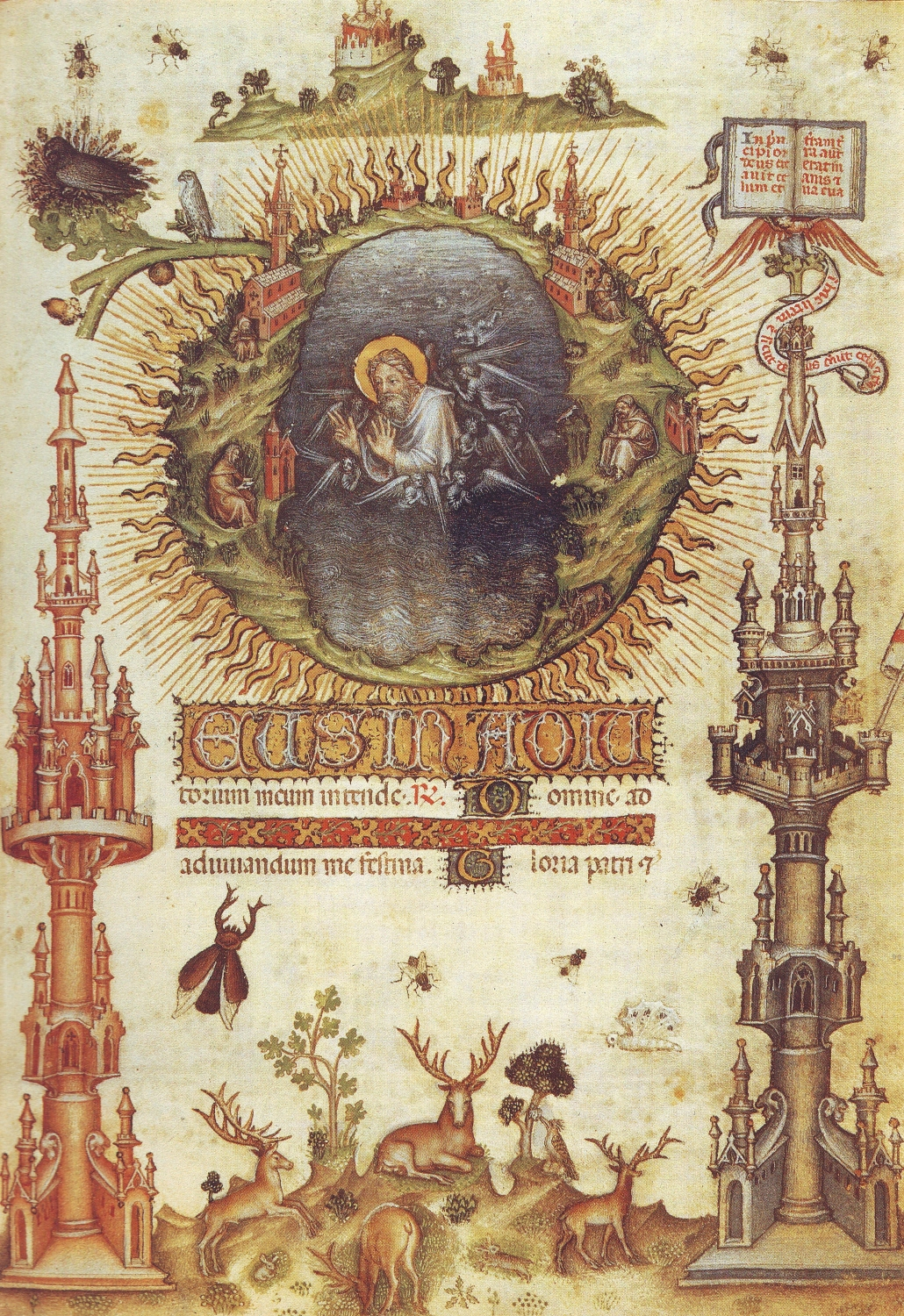
Giovannino de' Grassi, The eternal and the hermits, from the Gian Galeazzo Visconti Breviary.

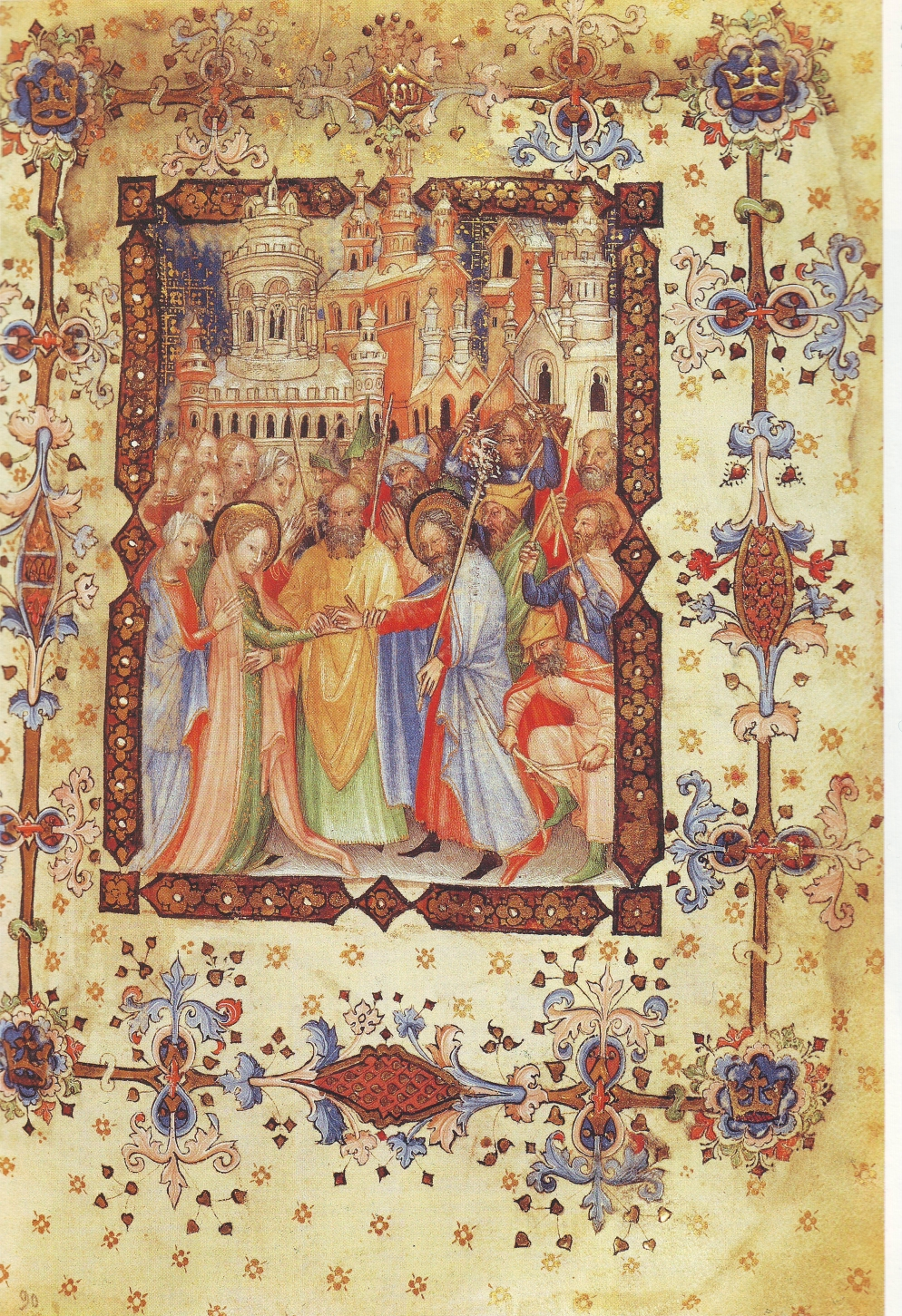
Giovannino de' Grassi, Marriage of the Virgin, from the Gian Galeazzo Visconti Breviary.

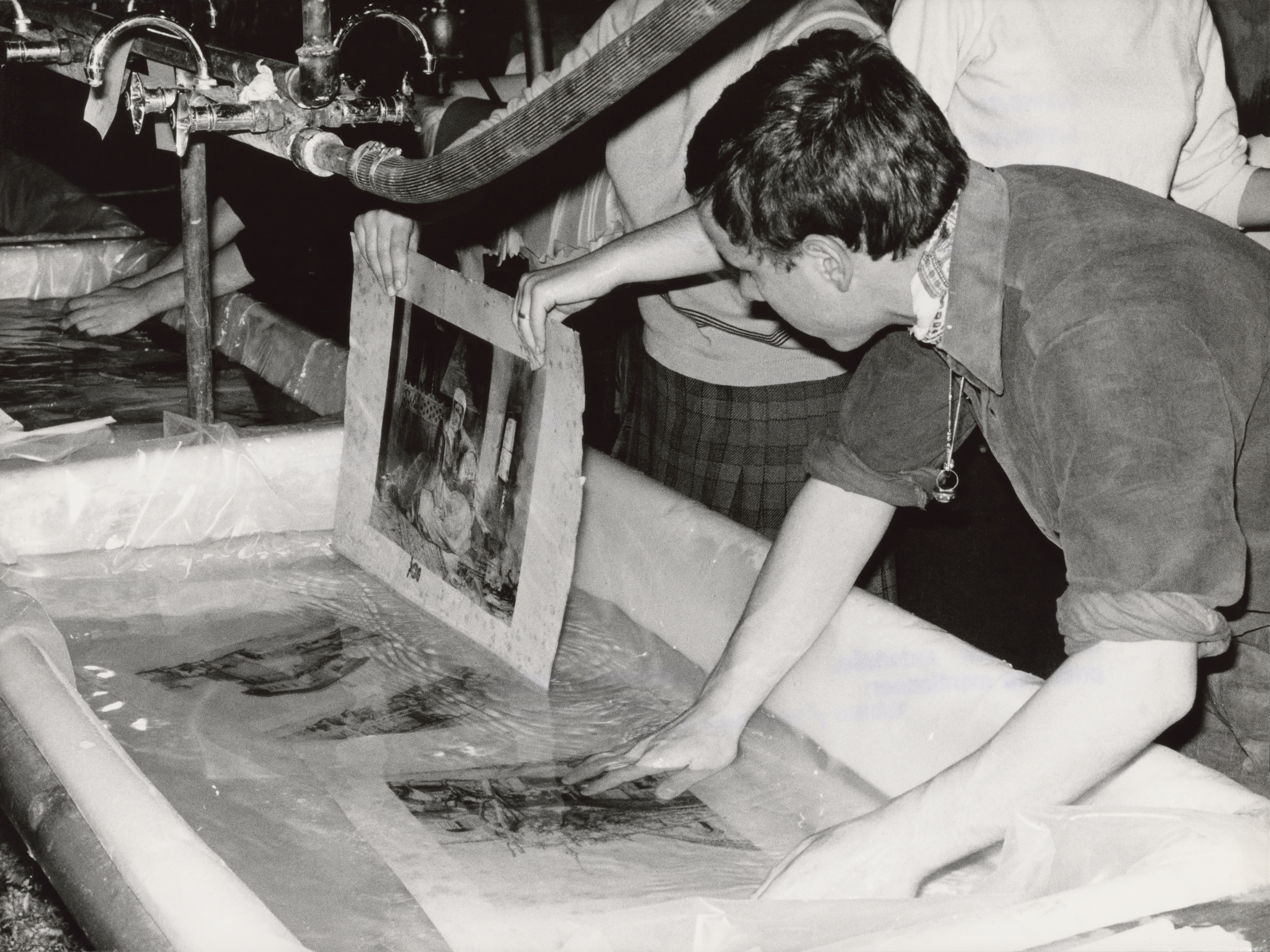
Manuscripts from the National Library being washed and dried in the boiler room of Firenze Santa Maria Novella railway station, after the November 1966 flood

Conventi Soppressi - 14th century manuscript by Landolfo Caracciolo

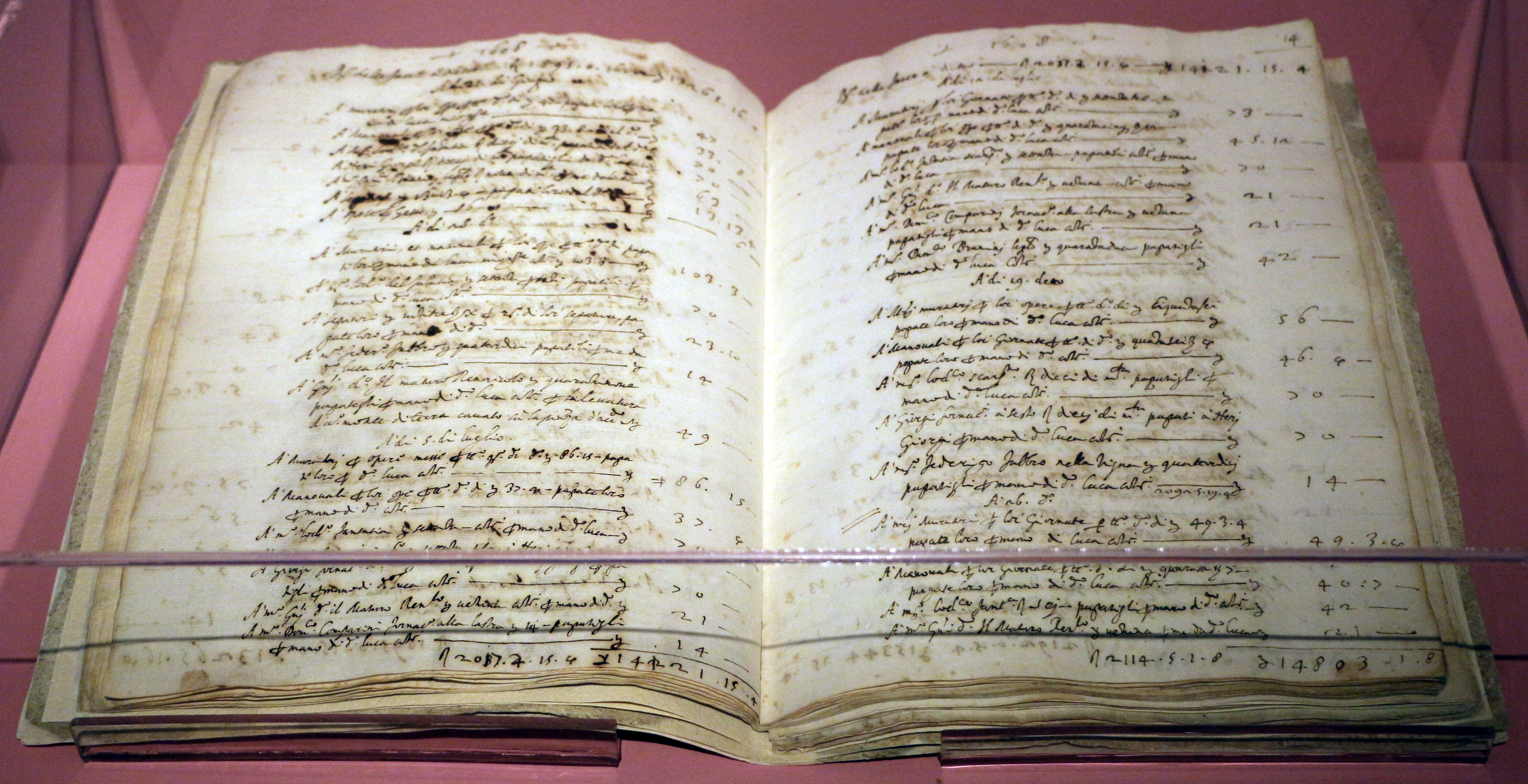
Geri Spini - 1607

== See also ==
- Books in Italy
- List of libraries in Italy
