= Scipio Colombo =

Italian dramatic baritone (1910–2002)

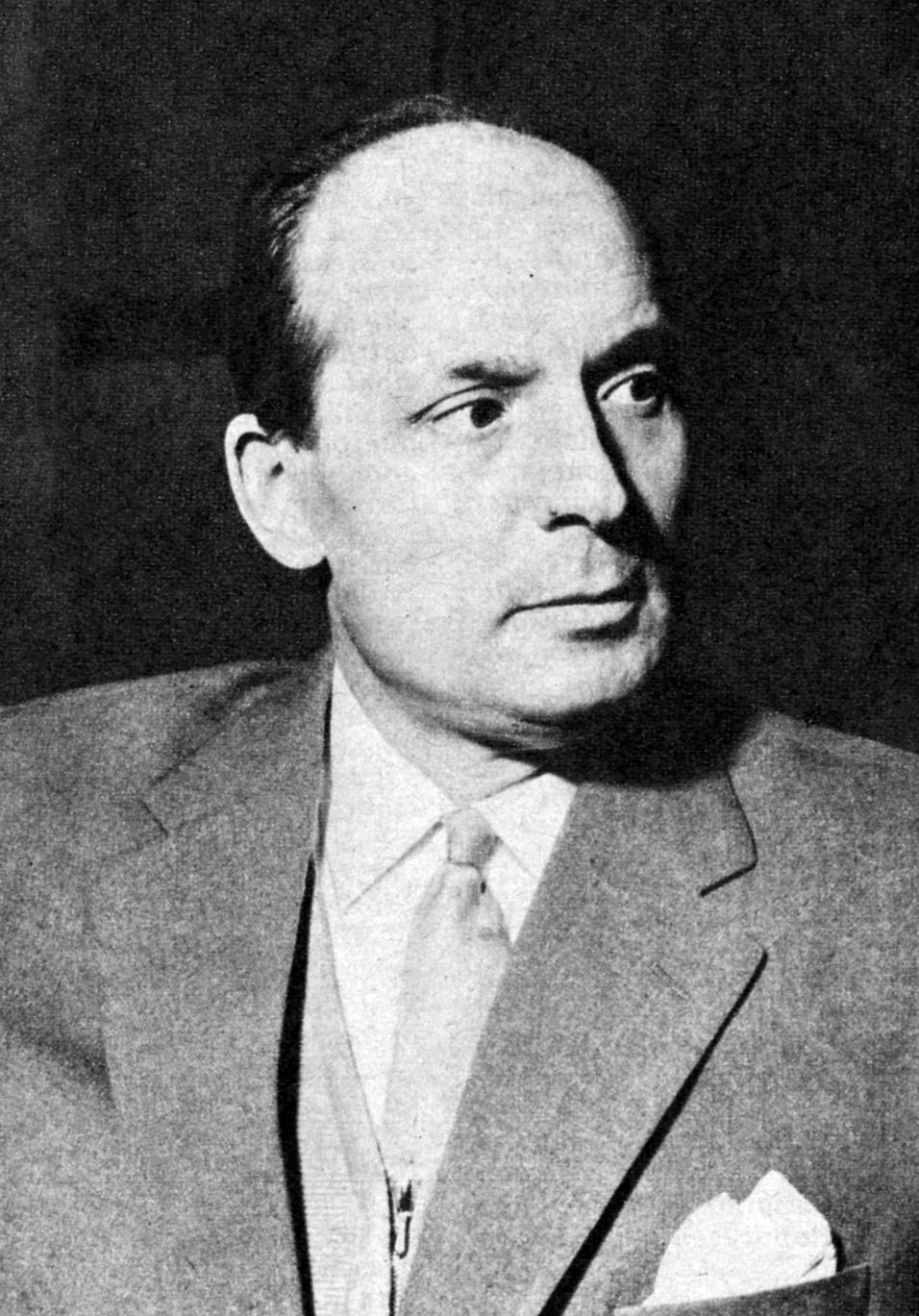
Scipio Colombo

Scipio Colombo (25 May 1910 – 13 April 2002) was an Italian dramatic baritone, and was known for his abilities as a musician and singing-actor.

Born in Vicenza, Italy, Colombo first studied philosophy at the University of Padua, before turning to music. He studied in Milan with Giuseppe Venturini and in Rome with Giuseppe de Luca, and made his debut in Alessandria, as Marcello in La bohème, in 1937.

Throughout World War II, he sang at most of the major opera houses of Italy, including the Teatro alla Scala. In 1947, he sang there in the Milan premiere of Prokofiev's The Love for Three Oranges, and of Britten's Peter Grimes, and later took part in the world premiere of Poulenc's Dialogues des Carmélites, as the Marquis de la Force, in 1957. He also sang in Mussorgski's Khovantchina, in 1949. He created roles in contemporary Italian works, notably in Dallapiccola's Il prigioniero (Florence, 1950), and Pizzetti's Cagliostro (La Scala, 1953). He also sang in Dallapiccola's Volo di notte at the Scala (1964).

Scipio Colombo in Prince Igor

He made guest appearances at the Opéra de Monte-Carlo, Vienna State Opera (Il trovatore, Rigoletto, and Tosca, in 1955 and 1956), Arena di Verona, and Covent Garden (Tosca, in 1956 and 1958), as well as the Aix-en-Provence Festival and the Bregenz Festival.

Colombo also sang many of the great baritone roles of the Italian repertory: Rigoletto, Count di Luna, Giorgio Germont, Count Almaviva, Don Giovanni, Guglielmo, Lescaut, Marcello, etc. In 1957, the singing-actor sang the Baron Scarpia to Magda Olivero's first Floria Tosca, for RAI (a performance published on Compact Discs, by Opera Depot).

In 1956, the baritone portrayed Ford in a film of Falstaff for RAI, with Giuseppe Taddei in the name part, Tullio Serafin conducting, and Herbert Graf directing. In 2005, VAI published the film on DVD.

He was awarded the Order of Merit by the Emperor of Japan.

Beginning in 1963, he taught at the Musikhochschule in Karlsruhe. He died in Gernsbach, Germany.

== Studio Discography ==
- Giordano: Fedora (Caniglia, Prandelli; Rossi, 1950) Cetra
- Verdi: Luisa Miller (Kelston, Lauri-Volpi; Rossi, 1951) Cetra
- Puccini: Tosca (dell'Argine, Scattolini; Quadri, 1951) Westminster
- Donizetti: Don Pasquale (Aimaro, Oncina, Luise; Quadri, 1952) Westminster

== Videography ==
- Verdi: Falstaff (Carteri, Moffo, Barbieri, Alva, Taddei; Serafin, Graf, 1956) VAI
