= Magda László =

Hungarian operatic sopranp (1912–2002)

- Magda László (photo with dedication)
- Born: 14 June 1912; Marosvásárhely, Hungary (Note: in 1919 according to other sources)
- Died: 2 August 2002 (aged 90); Nepi, Italy
- Occupation: Operatic soprano

Magda László (14 June 1912 – 2 August 2002) was a Hungarian operatic soprano, particularly associated with 20th-century operas.

== Life ad career ==
László was born in Marosvásárhely. She studied at the Franz Liszt Academy of Music in Budapest, and made her debut at the Budapest Opera in 1943, as Elisabeth in Tannhäuser, later singing Amelia in Simon Boccanegra.

In 1946, she settled in Italy, where she appeared in concert often with pianist Luigi Cortese, later becoming a regular guest at the Rome Opera and La Scala in Milan. She created the role of the mother in Dallapiccola's Il prigioniero on Italian radio in 1949, and also sang the role in the first staged performance in Florence, the following year, on 20 May 1950. A fine-singing actress and musician, she sang several roles in Italian contemporary works by Malipiero, Ghedini, and Lualdi.

She made guest appearances at the Glyndebourne Festival, notably in 1953 as Gluck's Alceste, in 1954 as Dorabella in Mozart's Così fan tutte, and in 1962 as Poppea in Monteverdi's L'incoronazione di Poppea. In 1954, she created the role of Cressida in William Walton's Troilus and Cressida, at the Royal Opera House in London.

Other notable roles included Strauss's Daphne, Busoni's Turandot, Marie in Alban Berg's Wozzeck, Isolde in Wagner's Tristan und Isolde, and Senta in Der fliegende Holländer.

László also recorded a number of the Bach cantatas conducted by Hermann Scherchen. She was the soprano soloist on Hermann Scherchen's recording of Beethoven's Ninth Symphony (Westminster HI-FI, WAL 208, 1953).

László died in Nepi, Italy.
