= Canti di prigionia =

Canti di prigionia (Songs of Imprisonment) is a setting for chorus, two pianos, two harps and percussion by the Italian composer Luigi Dallapiccola.

Dallapiccola sets three texts of imprisonment: a prayer of Mary Stuart, an extract from Book Three of Boethius' The Consolation of Philosophy and Savonarola's unfinished Meditation on the Psalm 'My hope is in Thee, O Lord'. Composed in 1938–1941, the first song was premiered on Brussels Radio in 1940, weeks before the Nazi Invasion of Belgium. Dallapiccola himself wrote that the work was a direct response to Benito Mussolini's speech introducing race laws to Italy:

I should have liked to protest, but I was not so naive as to disregard the fact that, in a totalitarian regime, the individual is powerless. Only by means of music would I be able to express my indignation.

Dallapiccola was to develop the material (and some of the musical ideas) in his 1948 opera Il prigioniero, in which he further explores the ideas of personal as well as ideological imprisonment. Canti di liberazione followed in 1955.

== Movements ==
The piece has three movements:

1. "Preghiera di Maria Stuarda" (Mary Stuart's Prayer)
2. "Invocazione di Boezio" (The Invocation of Boethius)
3. "Congedo di Girolamo Savonarola" (Girolamo Savonarola's Farewell)
