= Arlene Zallman =

American classical composer

Arlene Zallman (9 September 1934 – 25 November 2006) was an American composer and music educator.

== Life ==
Zallman was born in Philadelphia and graduated from the Juilliard School of Music. She received a master's degree from the University of Pennsylvania, where she studied composition with Vincent Persichetti and George Crumb. In 1959 she received a two-year Fulbright Scholarship to Florence, Italy, to study with Luigi Dallapiccola. She held positions on the faculty of the Oberlin College Conservatory of Music and Yale University and then became a professor of composition at Wellesley, Massachusetts in 1976.

She received the Marion S. Freschl Award for Vocal Composition, and awards from Meet the Composer, the Mellon Foundation, the Massachusetts Council for the Arts and Humanities, and the Guggenheim Foundation. Her Three Songs from Quasimodo won awards from both the National Endowment for the Arts and the International Society for Contemporary Music.

She held fellowships at the MacDowell Colony, where she received the Faye Barnaby Kent Fellow. During 2001-2, she was a Fellow at the Radcliffe Institute for Advanced Study. In 2003 Zallman was a guest composer-in-residence at the Rocca di Mezzo Music Festival in the Abruzzi region of Italy.

Zallman had two daughters. She died in her home in Wellesley in 2006 and was buried in Amherst, Massachusetts.

== Works ==
Zallman completed a number of compositions on commission, including The Trio in 1999. Her works are published by the Association for the Promotion of New Music and by C.F. Peters.

Selected works include:

- A Whimsical Offering piano solo 7 min 1994
- Analogy for solo flute 5 min 1971
- And with Ah! Bright Wings (G. M. Hopkins) chorus (SATB) and organ 8 min 1986
- Emerson Motets for chorus (SATB) 12 min 1985
- Letters (Dickinson) for mezzo-soprano and viola 5 min 1996
- Luoghi (Places) tenor 14 min 1998
- Nightsongs I for violin and piano 4 min 1984
- Racconto for piano 8 min 1968
- Shakespeare Sonnet CXXVIII (How oft, when thou my music) for baritone and piano 4 min 1980
- Shakespeare Sonnet XVIII (Shall I compare thee) for soprano and piano 3 min 1958
- Shakespeare Sonnets XXXIII (Full many a morning) & XL (Take all my loves) baritone, 7 min 1979
- Soliloquium solo violoncello 5 min 1986
- Sonnet/Sonata (Shakespeare CII My love is strengthened) for soprano and piano 7 min 1991
- The Cigarette Butt Blues (Pavese: Il blues delle cicche) for women’s voices, 7 min 1991
- Three Preludes piano solo 5 min 1979
- Three Songs from Quasimodo (Three Italian Songs) soprano, 6 min 1976
- To a Hurdy-Gurdy (Corrazzini: Per organo di barberia) for soprano and violoncello 4 min 1975
- Vox Faminae (Carmina burana) Song cycle for soprano and piano 23 min 2002
