= Il prigioniero =

- Radio opera by Luigi Dallapiccola
- Translation: The Prisoner
- Librettist: Dallapiccola
- Language: Italian
- Premiere: December 1, 1949; RAI

Il prigioniero (The Prisoner) is an opera (originally a radio opera) in a prologue and one act, with music and libretto by Luigi Dallapiccola. The opera was first broadcast by the Italian radio station RAI on 1 December 1949. The work is based on the short story La torture par l'espérance ("Torture by Hope") from the collection Nouveaux contes cruels by the French writer Auguste Villiers de l'Isle-Adam and from La Légende d'Ulenspiegel et de Lamme Goedzak by Charles De Coster. Some of the musical material is based on Dallapiccola's earlier choral work on a similar theme, Canti di prigionia (1938). Dallapiccola composed Il prigioniero in the period of 1944–1948. The work contains seven parts and lasts about 50 minutes. The musical idiom is serialism, and it is one of the first completed operas using that compositional method.

== Performance history ==
The opera's first stage performance was at the Teatro Comunale Florence on May 20, 1950. The performers were Magda Laszlo, Mario Binci, Scipio Colombo, with conductor Hermann Scherchen. The professional American premiere took place on September 29, 1960, at the New York City Center, where the cast included Norman Treigle, Richard Cassilly and Anne McKnight; Leopold Stokowski conducted Christopher West's production. According to the publisher, the first dozen years after the première had over 186 performances of Il prigioniero on radio, concert platform, and stage.

== Roles ==
Roles, voice types, premiere cast
Role	Voice type	Premiere cast, 20 May 1950 Conductor: Hermann Scherchen
The Mother	soprano	Magda László
The Prisoner	baritone	Scipio Colombo
The Jailer	tenor	Mario Binci
The Grand Inquisitor	tenor	Mario Binci
First priest	tenor	Mariano Caruso
Second priest	baritone	Giangiacomo Guelfi
A Brother of Redemption (torturer)	silent	Luciano Vela

== Synopsis ==
Place: Zaragoza
Time: Second half of the sixteenth century

=== Prologue ===
As the Mother waits to visit her son in prison; she sings of a dream she has had multiple times that haunts her sleep. In it, a figure resembling King Philip II approaches her from the end of a cavern, but then changes imperceptibly into Death. The Mother's singing becomes hysterical, and the offstage chorus cuts her off, bringing the end of the prologue.

=== Act 1 ===
The first scene opens inside a cell in the Inquisitor's Prison with the Prisoner and his Mother speaking. The Prisoner speaks of his torture and suffering, and also of how the Gaoler has brought back his hope and faith, and has made him wish to return to prayer as he did as a child. The Gaoler then interrupts the conversation with news that Flanders is in revolt and that the bell of Roelandt could soon ring out again, trying to bring new hope to the Prisoner. As the Gaoler leaves with the words "There is one who watches over you ... Have faith, brother. Sleep now ... and hope," he also does not close the cell door completely. Upon noticing this, the Prisoner rushes out.

The action moves out of the cell and follows the Prisoner on his attempt at escape through the underground passages of the prison. While trying to escape, the Prisoner sees but is not seen by a torturer and is passed unnoticed by two monks too deep in theological discussion to take notice of him. The Prisoner finally believes he can smell fresh air, and when he hears a bell he believes to be that of Roelandt, he opens a door to what he hopes is freedom.

The final scene finds the Prisoner in a garden at night. He is exuberant at having escaped, and moves towards a great cedar tree that is in the foreground. He makes as if to hug the tree, only to be embraced by the words and sight of the Grand Inquisitor, who is seemingly a part of the tree. The Grand Inquisitor asks the Prisoner, "Why do you want to leave us now, on the very eve of your salvation?" At this point, the Prisoner comes around to the thought that perhaps his ultimate salvation is to be gained from the stake. The opera concludes with the Prisoner's enigmatic whisper of "Freedom?"

== Recordings ==
- CBS 61344 (Italian issue, from radio performance): Liliana Poli, Eberhard Wächter, Gerald English, Werner Krenn, Christian Boesch; Austrian Radio Choir and Orchestra; Carl Melles, conductor
- Decca/London OSA-1166 (LP issue – first studio recording): Maurizio Mazzieri, Giulia Barrera, Romano Emili, Gabor Carelli; University of Maryland Chorus; National Symphony Orchestra; Antal Doráti, conductor
- Sony Classical SK 68 323: Jorma Hynninen, Phyllis Bryn-Julson, Howard Haskin, Sven-Erik Alexandersson, Lage Wedin; Swedish Radio Choir; Eric Ericson Chamber Choir; Swedish Radio Symphony Orchestra; Esa-Pekka Salonen, conductor
- Chandos CHAN 5276: Anna Maria Chiuri, Michael Nagy, Stephan Rügamer, Adam Riis, Steffen Bruun; Danish National Concert Choir, Danish National Symphony Orchestra; Gianandrea Noseda, conductor
