= Laura Dallapiccola =

Italian librarian, translator

- Born: Laura Domitilla Maria Coen Luzzatto; 9 February 1911; Trieste, now Italy
- Died: 26 March 1995 (aged 84); Florence, Italy
- Education: University of Florence
- Occupations: Librarian, translator
- Spouse: Luigi Dallapiccola
- Children: Anna Libera (b. 1944)
- Parents: Raffaele Moisè Coen Luzzatto (father); Irma Fano (mother)

Laura Coen Luzzatto Dallapiccola (9 February 1911 – 26 March 1995) was an Italian librarian and translator.

== Biography ==
Laura Domitilla Maria Coen Luzzatto was born in Trieste (now part of Italy) into a Jewish family. Her father was Raffaele Moisè Coen Luzzatto and her mother was Irma Fano, both of Jewish origin. Laura was born a Turkish-Ottoman citizen, and only on 20 July 1922, at the age of eleven, did she and the rest of the family become official Italian citizens.

Laura Luzzatto graduated in Trieste in 1928, in the same year she moved to Florence to attend the Faculty of Letters and Philosophy. Four years later, she defended her thesis about Niccolò Tommaseo with her supervisor Guido Mazzoni and graduated on 16 May 1932. In 1932–1933, she attended the School for Paleographer Librarians and Archivists, also at the University of Florence, and she joined the Italian Library Association in 1934.

After graduation and specialization, she won a contest for a job at the National Central Library of Florence, where she started working in 1933, dealing mainly with the Bollettino delle pubblicazioni italiane (Bulletin of Italian publications), until 1939 when she lost her job. She was removed from her position in accordance with the fascist racial laws of November 1938, which made it illegal for Laura, a Jew, to have a job. She had been enrolled in the Jewish Community of Florence since 1930. Later she was forced into hiding in the apartment of a friend in Fiesole.

In January 1938, Laura converted to the Catholic religion and on 1 May married the Italian composer Luigi Dallapiccola, taking his surname. She first met the composer in 1931.

=== German occupation ===
During the occupation of Florence by German forces, Laura and Luigi lived in hiding in Fiesole with a friend musician, Sandro Materassi. The couple had a daughter, 1 December 1944, named Anna Libera or Annalibera. The connection between the choice of that name and the liberation from fascism became clear with Luigi's composition Quaderno musical di Annalibera (1952), became a preliminary study for Canti di liberazione (1951–55).

After Allied forces defeated fascist forces in Florence, and three months after the birth of her daughter, Laura was reinstated to the Library in June 1948 and promoted to third-class library director. She worked there until she retired in 1950 so she could accompany her husband on his travels. By that time, Luigi had become a famous composer and was making frequent trips to the United States, including appearances at Tanglewood in western Massachusetts, and teaching at Queens College, New York beginning in 1956.

=== Post-retirement ===
In 1950, following the recommendation of librarian Francesco Barberi, Laura was added to the first editorial board of Libri: International Journal of Libraries and Information Services. In addition to being a journal editor, she was also a contributor and submitted news from Italy.

From the end of the 1950s, Laura translated many works from German to Italian. Some of her efforts were in the music field (including the letters of Alma Mahler and Brahms and a history of jazz) and others covered a range of works for publishing houses that included Mondadori, Il Saggiatore, La Nuova Italy and others. During this time she often signed her work as Laura Dallapiccola, but sometimes she reverted to her maiden name Laura Luzzatto.

=== Last years ===
After her husband's death, on 19 February 1975, Laura devoted herself to organizing Luigi's works by setting up two collections, the first at the Alessandro Bonsanti Contemporary Archive at the Gabinetto Vieusseux library (in 1976), and the second at the National Central Library of Florence (in 1983).

She died in Florence in 1995. At her request, her remaining library, which contained many scores of various composers, was donated to National Central Library.

== Selected works ==
- Luzzatto, Laura. (1932). The literary criticism of Nicolò Tommaseo. (thesis)
- Rufer, Josef, and Laura Dallapiccola. (1962).Teoria della composizione dodecafonica. A. Mondadori.
- Scherliess, V., & Dallapiccola, L. (1985). Alban Berg. Norma.
- Eggebrecht, H. H., & Dallapiccola, L. (1994). La musica di Gustav Mahler. La nuova Italia.
- Dalhaus, C., & Dallapiccola, L. (1997). La musica dell'Ottocento. La nuova Italia.
- Berendt, J. E., Huesmann, G., Plant, A. S., Cerchiari, L., & Luzzatto, L. (2015). The Jazz Book: From Ragtime to the 21st Century. Odoya.
