= Luigi Dallapiccola =

Italian composer (1904–1975)

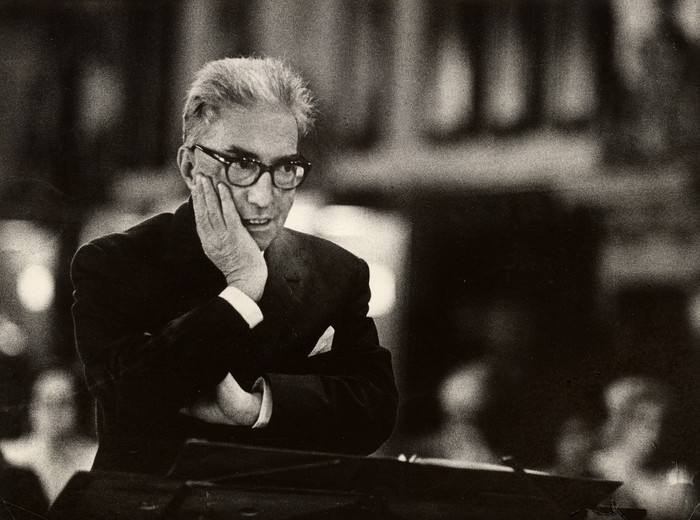
- Born: 3 February 1904; Pisino d'Istria, Austria-Hungary (now Pazin, Croatia)
- Died: 19 February 1975 (aged 71); Florence, Italy
- Education: Florence Conservatory
- Occupations: Composer; Academic teacher

Luigi Dallapiccola (3 February 1904 – 19 February 1975) was an Italian composer and pianist known for his lyrical twelve-tone compositions.

== Biography ==
Dallapiccola was born in Pisino d'Istria, Austria-Hungary (current Pazin, Croatia), to Italian parents.

Unlike many composers born into highly musical environments, his early musical career was irregular at best. Political disputes over his birth region of Istria led to instability and frequent moves. His father was headmaster of an Italian-language school – the only one in the city – which was shut down at the start of World War I. The family, considered politically subversive, was placed in internment at Graz, Austria, where the budding composer did not even have access to a piano, though he did attend performances at the local opera house which cemented his desire to pursue composition as a career. Once back in Pisino after the war, he travelled frequently. Dallapiccola took his piano degree at the Florence Conservatory in the 1920s. He also studied composition with Vito Frazzi.

He became a professor at the conservatory in 1931; until his 1967 retirement, he spent his career there teaching lessons in piano as a secondary instrument, replacing his teacher Ernesto Consolo as the older man's illness prevented him from continuing. Dallapiccola's students included Abraham Zalman Walker, Luciano Berio, Bernard Rands, Donald Martino, Halim El-Dabh, Julia Perry, Ernesto Rubin de Cervin, Arlene Zallman, Roland Trogan, Noel Da Costa, and Raymond Wilding-White. See: List of music students by teacher: C to F#Luigi Dallapiccola.

Dallapiccola's early experiences under the fascist regime of Benito Mussolini coloured his outlook and output for the rest of his life. He once supported Mussolini, believing the regime's propaganda, and it was not until the 1930s that he became passionate about his political views, in response to the Second Italo-Ethiopian War and Italy's involvement in the Spanish Civil War. Mussolini's sympathy with Adolf Hitler's views on race, which threatened Dallapiccola's Jewish wife Laura Luzzatto, only hardened his stance. Canti di prigionia and Il prigioniero are reflections of this impassioned concern; the former was his first true protest work.

During World War II he was in the dangerous position of opposing the Nazis, though he tried to go about his career as usual, and did to a limited extent. On two occasions he was forced to go into hiding for several months. He continued his touring as a recitalist, but only in countries not occupied by the Nazis.

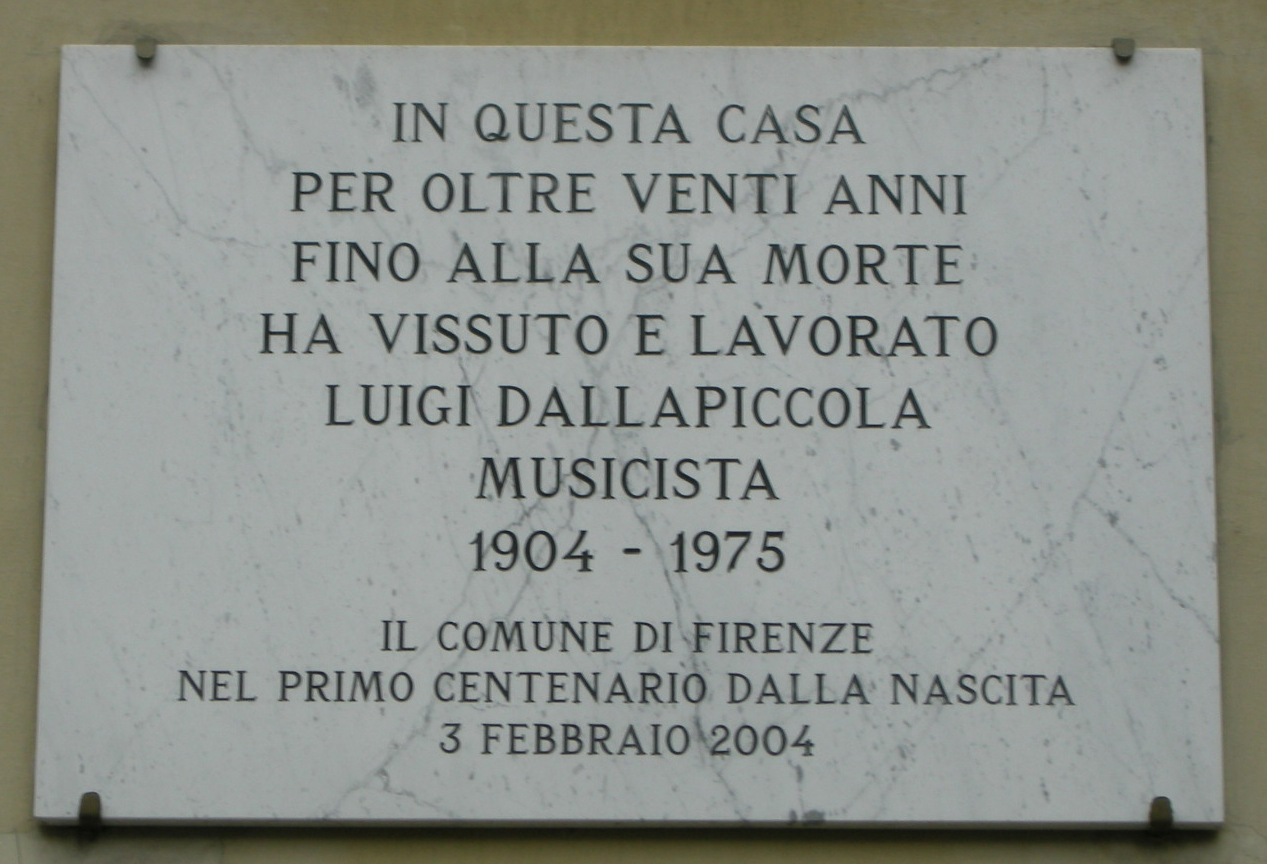
Plaque on Via Romana, Florence, at Dallapiccola's former home.

After the war, his compositions first made it into the public eye, with his opera Il prigioniero, premiered in 1949, sparking his fame. He made frequent travels to the United States, including appearances at Tanglewood in the summers of 1951 and 1952 and several semesters of teaching courses in composition at Queens College in New York City beginning in 1956. He was a sought-after lecturer throughout Western Europe and the Americas. Dallapiccola's 1968 opera Ulisse would be the peak of his career, after which his compositional output was sparse; his later years were largely spent writing essays rather than music.

He finished no further compositions after 1972 due to his failing health; he died in Florence in 1975 of pulmonary edema. There are, however, very few sketches and fragments of work from this period, including a vocal work left unfinished just hours before his death.

== Music ==
It was Richard Wagner's music that inspired Dallapiccola to start composing in earnest, and Claude Debussy's that caused him to stop: hearing Wagner's Der fliegende Holländer while exiled in Austria convinced him that composition was his calling, but after first hearing Debussy in 1921, at age 17, he stopped composing for three years in order to give this important influence time to sink in. The neoclassical works of Ferruccio Busoni would figure prominently in his later work, but his biggest influence would be the ideas of the Second Viennese School, which he encountered in the 1930s, particularly Alban Berg and Anton Webern. Dallapiccola's works of the 1920s, the period of his adherence to fascism, have been withdrawn with the instruction that they never be performed, though they still exist under controlled access for study.

His works widely use the serialism developed and embraced by his idols; he was, in fact, the first Italian to write in the method, and the primary proponent of it in Italy, and he developed serialist techniques to allow for a more lyrical, tonal style. Throughout the 1930s his style developed from a diatonic style with bursts of chromaticism to a consciously serialist outlook. He went from using twelve-tone rows for melodic material to structuring his works entirely serially. With the adoption of serialism, he never lost the feel for melody that many of the detractors of the Second Viennese School claimed to be absent in modern dodecaphonic music. His disillusionment with Mussolini's regime effected a change in his style: after the Abyssinian campaign, he claimed that his writing would no longer ever be as light and carefree as it once was. While there are later exceptions, particularly the Piccolo concerto per Muriel Couvreux, this is largely the case.

Liriche Greche (1942–45), for solo voice with instruments, would be his first work composed entirely in this twelve-tone style, composed concurrently with his last original purely diatonic work, the ballet Marsia (1943). The following decade showed a refinement in his technique and the increasing influence of Webern's work. After this, from the 1950s on, the refined, contemplative style he developed would characterize his output, in contrast to the more raw and passionate works of his youth. Most of his works would be songs for solo voice and instrumental accompaniment. His touch with instrumentation is noted for its impressionistic sensuality and soft textures, heavy on sustained notes by woodwinds and strings (particularly middle-range instruments, such as the clarinet and viola).

The politically charged Canti di prigionia for chorus and ensemble was the beginning of a loose triptych on the highly personal themes of imprisonment and injustice; the one-act opera Il prigioniero and the cantata Canti di liberazione completed the trilogy. Of these, Il prigioniero (1944–48) has become Dallapiccola's best-known work. It tells the chilling story of a political prisoner whose jailor, in an apparent gesture of fraternity, allows him to escape from his cell. At the moment of his freedom, however, he finds he has been the victim of a cruel practical joke as he runs straight into the arms of the Grand Inquisitor, who smilingly leads him off to the stake at which he is to be burned alive. The opera's pessimistic outlook reflects Dallapiccola's complete disillusionment with fascism (which he had naïvely supported when Mussolini first came to power) and the music contained therein is both beautifully realized and supremely disquieting.

His final opera Ulisse, with his own libretto after Homer's Odyssey, was the culmination of his life's work. It was composed over eight years, including and developing themes from his earlier works, and was his last large-scale composition.

== List of works ==
- Partita (1930–32), orchestra
- Estate (1932), male chorus
- Divertimento in quattro esercizi (1934), soprano, flute, oboe, clarinet, viola, cello
- Musica per tre pianoforti (Inni) (1935), three pianos
- Sei cori di Michelangelo Buonarroti il Giovane (1932–36), 1st series: unaccompanied mixed voices; 2nd series: two sopranos and two altos and 17 instruments; 3rd series: mixed voices and orchestra
- Tre laudi (1936–37), voice and 13 instruments
- Volo di Notte (1938), one-act opera
- Canti di prigionia (1938–41), for chorus, two pianos, 2 harps and percussion (a: Preghiera di Maria Stuarda; b: Invocazione di Boezio; c: Congedo di Girolamo Savonarola)
- Piccolo concerto per Muriel Couvreux (1939–41), piano and chamber orchestra
- Studio sul Capriccio n. 14 di Niccolò Paganini (1942), piano
- Marsia (1942–43), ballet
- Frammenti sinfonici dal balletto Marsia (1942–43), orchestra
- Liriche greche (1942–45), a: Cinque frammenti di Saffo, for voice and chamber orchestra; b: Due liriche di Anacreonte, for singer, piccolo clarinet, A clarinet, viola, piano; c: Sex Carmina Alcaei, for canenda voice, nonnullis comitantibus musicis
- Il prigioniero (1944–48), opera.
- Ciaccona, Intermezzo e Adagio (1945), for solo cello
- Sonatina canonica, in mi bemolle maggiore, su Capricci di Niccolò Paganini, per pianoforte (1946), for piano
- Rencesvals (1946), baritone and piano
- Due studi (1946–47), violin and piano
- Due pezzi (1947), orchestra (version of Due studi)
- Quattro liriche di Antonio Machado (1948), soprano and piano
- Tre episodi dal balletto Marsia (1949), piano
- Tre poemi (1949), voice and chamber orchestra
- Job (1950), sacra rappresentazione (mystery play)
- Tartiniana (1951), violin and orchestra
- Quaderno musicale di Annalibera (1952), solo piano, featuring the BACH motif
- Goethe-Lieder (1953), for mezzo-soprano, piccolo clarinet, clarinet, and bass clarinet
- Variazioni (1954), orchestra (version of Quaderno musicale di Annalibera)
- Piccola musica notturna (1954), orchestra
- Canti di liberazione (1951–55), for mixed chorus and orchestra
- An Mathilde (1955), cantata for soprano and orchestra
- Tartiniana seconda (1955–56), violin and piano, or violin and chamber orchestra
- Cinque canti (1956), baritone and 8 instruments
- Concerto per la notte di Natale dell'anno 1956 (1957), chamber orchestra and soprano
- Requiescant (1957–58), chorus and orchestra
- Dialoghi (1960), cello and orchestra
- Piccola musica notturna (1960–61), chamber ensemble
- Three Questions With Two Answers (1962), orchestra
- Preghiere (1962), baritone and chamber orchestra
- Parole di San Paolo (1964), voice and instruments
- Quattro liriche di Antonio Machado (1964), version for soprano and chamber orchestra
- Ulisse (1960–68), opera in a prologue and two acts
- Sicut umbra... (1970), mezzo-soprano and 12 instruments
- Tempus destruendi / Tempus aedificandi (1971), chorus
- Ulisse. Suite dall'opera/A (1971), soprano, bass-baritone, orchestra
- Ulisse. Suite dall'opera/B (1971), 3 sopranos, mezzo-soprano/alto, tenor, bass-baritone, chorus and orchestra
- Commiato (1972), soprano and ensemble

=== Writings by Dallapiccola ===
- Appunti. Incontri. Meditazioni., Edizioni Suvini Zerboni, 1970
- Dallapiccola on Opera, Selected writings of Luigi Dallapiccola, Vol 1, Toccata Press (1987)

=== Writings in English on Dallapiccola ===
- Raymond Fearn, The music of Luigi Dallapiccola. New York, Rochester, 2003
- Edward Wilkinson, "An interpretation of serialism in the work of Luigi Dallapiccola". Phd diss., Royal Holloway, 1982
- Ben Earle, "Musical modernism in Fascist Italy: Dallapiccola in the thirties", Phd diss., Cambridge, 2001
- Lanza, Andrea (2008). "An Outline of Italian Instrumental Music in the 20th Century". Sonus. A Journal of Investigations into Global Musical Possibilities. 29/1: 1–21. ISSN 0739-229X.
